= Joint Exercise Zolfaghar 99 =

2020 Iranian military exercise

Zolfaghar 99
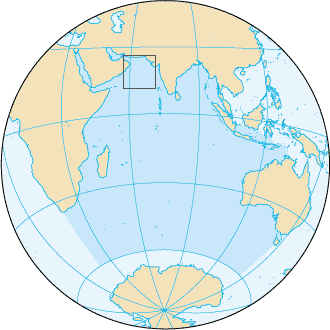
- Approximate location of the exercise indicated with square
- Type: Military exercise
- Locations: Sea of Oman; Indian Ocean
- Commanded by: Commodore Habibollah Sayyari
- Date: 10–12 September 2020
- Executed by: Ground Forces; Air Force; Air Defense Force; Navy

Joint Exercise Zolfaghar 99 (Persian: رزمایش مشترک ذوالفقار ۹۹) was a large-scale military exercise conducted jointly by all four branches of the Islamic Republic of Iran Army between 10 and 12 September 2020. The drills were held at the Sea of Oman and the Indian Ocean 10 degrees north of the Equator, including about 2 million-square-kilometer of area. Held in three phases, it involved intelligence, tactics and show of force.

== Major events ==
=== Drones ===
Ababil and Karrar unmanned aerial vehicles were used to monitor the drill. The January 2019 unveiled UAV Kaman-12 also flew over the area to conduct the same mission. Simorgh, a UCAV unveiled in December 2019, accomplished both reconnaissance and combat missions. The drone hit naval targets with bombs, flying more than 1,000 kilometers.

=== Naval drills ===
IRIS Fateh (920), the lead ship of Iran's endogenously-built Fateh-class coastal submarine, made her first presence during the drill and a brief footage of her sailing on the surface was aired. Ghadir-class midget submarines were also seen taking part by firing Jask-2 submarine-launched cruise missile.

Qader anti-ship cruise missiles were launched at sea targets off the coast. Iran said it successfully destructed target at a distance of over 200 kilometers. It also included an amphibious assault by commandos and marines.

=== Alleged warning to American aircraft ===
Iran said three American aircraft including a Boeing P-8 Poseidon, a General Atomics MQ-9 Reaper and a Northrop Grumman RQ-4 Global Hawk were warned after they had entered the air defense identification zone (ADIZ). According to Iranian officials, after "ignoring warnings by Iran's defense systems to keep away from the drill zone", American aircraft were intercepted by Iranian drones and subsequently left the area.

== Reactions ==
United States Central Command did not comment on the war game, nor Iranian allegations about warnings to its aircraft.

== See also ==
- Great Prophet XIV, Islamic Revolutionary Guard Corps drill in the same year
