= Piroozan (hovercraft) =

Class overview
- Builders: Defense industry of Iran
- Operators: Islamic Republic of Iran Navy
- In commission: 2019–present

General characteristics
- Type: Hovercraft
- Displacement: 10 tons (full load)
- Beam: 8.5 m (28 ft)
- Draught: 4 m (13 ft)
- Speed: 40 knots (74 km/h; 46 mph) (maximum)

Piroozan is an Iranian-made hovercraft. The Piroozan-class Hovercraft carriers are the next generation of fully indigenous military Hovercraft that will be put into service by the Navy. In May 2015, various media outlets published satellite images showing the Iranian-made "Piroozan" Hovercraft carrier alongside other military Hovercraft at the army base in Bandar Abbas. The Piroozan has a significantly reduced radar cross-section and a height of one-third that of existing models, while maintaining the same tonnage and capacity; the propulsion system is equipped with two propellers.

In addition, the Piroozan is equipped with anti-ship cruise missiles, which have a mobile launcher that can be raised before firing and retracted afterwards. This design not only helps reduce the radar cross-section, but also significantly reduces air resistance and fuel consumption. In addition, it is noteworthy that the Piroozan Hovercraft is equipped with a sonar detection system and has been added with the ability to launch torpedoes. The width of this hovercraft is about 8.5 meters, the height is 3.5 to 4 meters and the speed is 40 knots. It can carry 10 tons of cargo. The noteworthy point is that the space inside the fuselage allows for the placement of two tactical ambassador vehicles side by side. These vehicles are equipped with various weapons, including 107mm rocket launchers, 106mm recoilless guns, anti-armor missiles and 81mm mortars.

== See also ==
- Hovercraft BH.7
- Tondar Hovercraft
