= Islamic Republic of Iran Navy Missile Command =

Missile defence component of the Islamic Republic of Iran Navy

Patch of Missile Command personnel

The Missile Command (Persian: فرماندهی موشکی) is the coastal missile defence element of the Islamic Republic of Iran Navy (IRIN). In addition to this military formation, the Navy as well as the Aerospace Force of the Islamic Revolutionary Guard Corps –which independent of IRIN conduct their operations under another command hierarchy– have an arsenal of anti-ship missiles for coastal defence. The forces have collectively changed the balance of naval power in the Persian Gulf region since the mid-2000s decade, due to their capability to target almost all assets of the United States Navy's Fifth Fleet from Iranian coastline.

== Missiles ==
The unit is known to operate the following anti-ship missile (AShM) systems:

- Kowsar
- Nasr-1
- Noor
- Ghader
- Ghadir
- Ra'ad
- Abu Mahdi
