= Al-Sabehat =

Iranian swimmer delivery vehicle

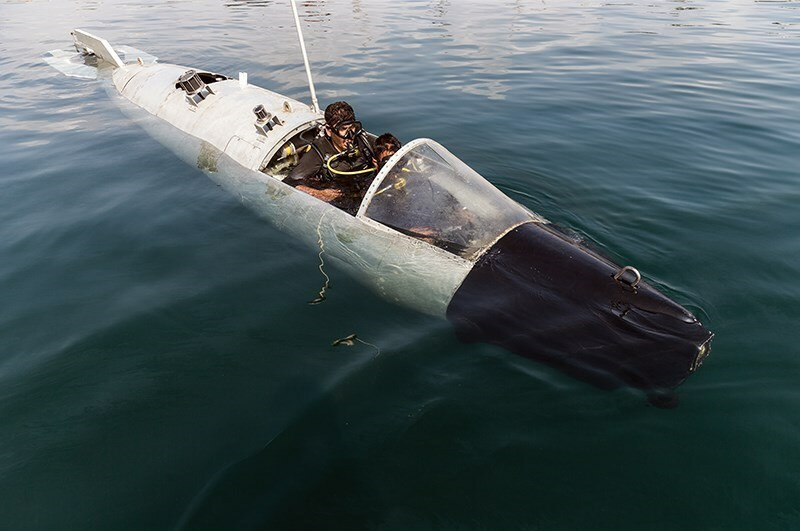

Class overview
- Builders: Marine Industries Organization
- Operators: Islamic Republic of Iran Navy; Navy of the Islamic Revolutionary Guard Corps
- Built: 1996–present
- In service: 2000–present

General characteristics
- Type: Swimmer delivery vehicle
- Length: 8 m (26 ft 3 in)
- Complement: 2 + 3 divers

Al-Sabehat (Persian: السابحات) is a swimmer delivery vehicle built and operated by Iran. The SDV is approximately 8 m (26 ft 3 in) long, and carries a crew of 2 plus 3 divers. It can carry out coastal reconnaissance missions, planting naval mines on ports and anchorages, as well as lifting special forces. According to Abhijit Singh, a senior fellow at Observer Research Foundation, the SDV "can be used effectively for unconventional attacks".

Hengam class ships function as a mothership for Al-Sabehat SDVs.

Al-Sabehat SDV is designed at Esfahan Underwater Research Centre. Planning and construction of Al-Sabehat was reportedly started in 1996 and the first vessel was unveiled on 29 August 2000.

== See also ==
- List of submarine classes in service
- List of naval ship classes of Iran
- List of military equipment manufactured in Iran
