= IRIS Fateh =

Iranian-made Fateh-class submarine

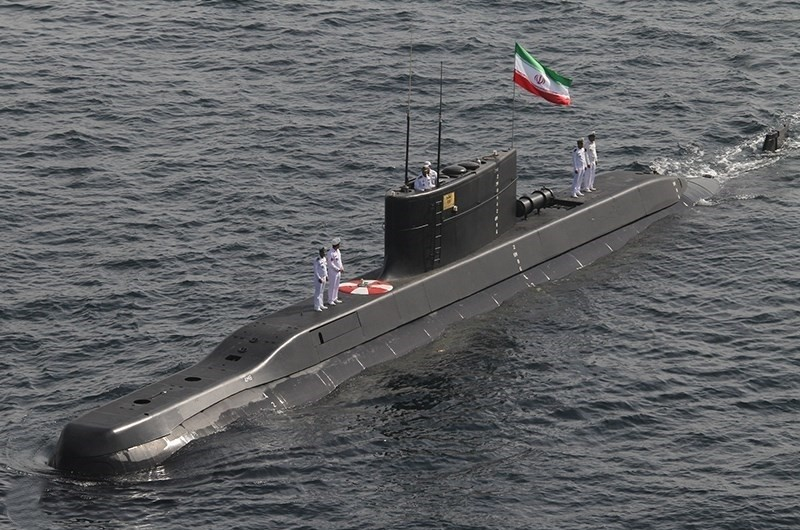
- IRINS Fateh (920)

History

Iran
- Operator: Islamic Republic of Iran Navy
- Commissioned: 17 February 2019
- Identification: 920
- Fate: sunk 3 March 2026

General characteristics
- Class & type: Fateh-class submarine
- Displacement: 600 tons
- Endurance: 35 days
- Test depth: 200 m (660 ft)
- Armament: 4 × 533mm torpedo tubes

IRIS Fateh (Persian: فاتح, lit. 'conqueror') was a coastal submarine of the Islamic Republic of Iran Navy, and the lead ship of her class. She was commissioned into the Southern Fleet on 17 February 2019 at Bostanu shipyard, Bandar Abbass, and bestowed by Iranian President Hassan Rouhani. It was sunk by the US Navy on 3 March 2026.

== Construction ==
Fateh was launched in 2016, according to Sebastien Roblin. However, H. I. Sutton says Fateh was launched in September 2013 with the hull number 961, before being changed to 920. Iran had announced that it will soon launch an indigenous submarine on 4 December 2016.

== Description ==
Jeremy Binnie of Jane's commented that based on released imagery, the submarine was equipped with retractable sensors such as an electro-optical mast and an optical periscope, as well as radar and electronic intelligence sensors. The propulsion system of Fateh was covered and is unknown. Four 533 mm torpedo tubes were seen on her bow.

Iranian sources wrote that she was armed with torpedoes, AShM cruise missiles and naval mines that could be fired when submerged. According to Caleb Larson, Fateh was likely able to fire Jask-2 missiles.

== Service history ==
Fateh was first seen on action during Joint Exercise Zolfaghar 99, held in September 2020. It first fired torpedoes during Eqtedar (Power)-99 naval exercise, held in January 2021.

The Iranian navy claimed on 20 April 2023, that the Fateh submarine detected the American nuclear-powered submarine USS Florida that was cruising in the Strait of Hormuz stealthily and forced it to surface and correct its course. "The US submarine was approaching while submerged, but the Iranian submarine Fateh detected it and carried out... maneuvers to force it to surface as it went through the Strait (of Hormuz). It had also entered into our territorial waters but ... it corrected its course after being warned", the Navy’s commander said. The United States Navy dismissed the Iranian claim as propaganda.

On 3 March 2026, CENTCOM released a video on X announcing the Fateh had been sunk during Operation Epic Fury.

== See also ==
- List of current ships of the Islamic Republic of Iran Navy
