= Tondar (hovercraft) =

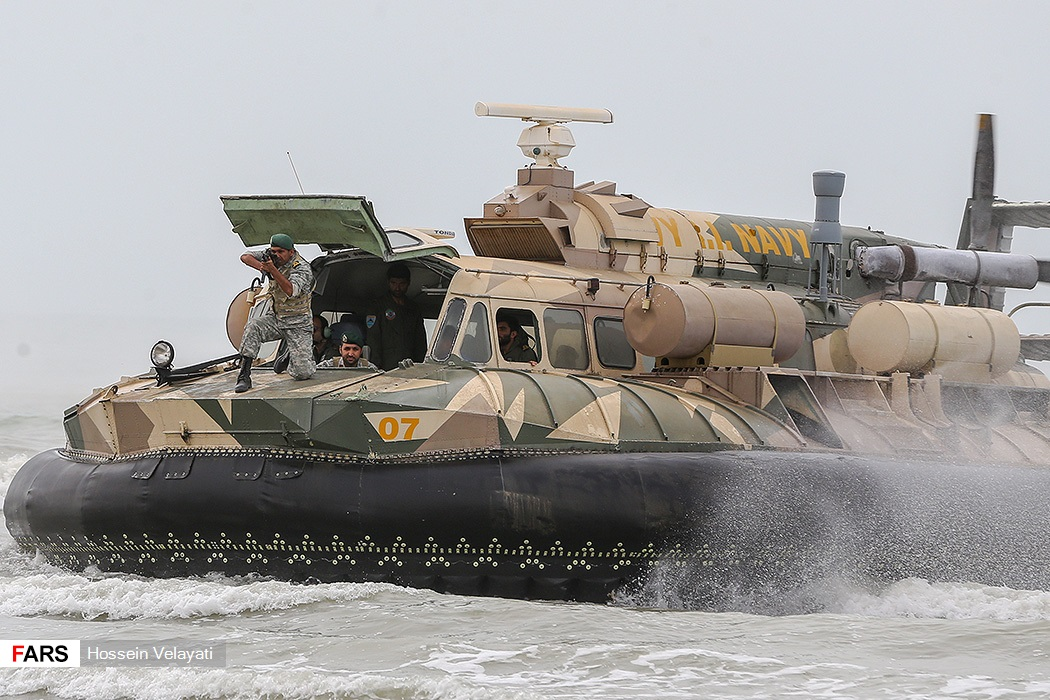
- Image of Tondar floating in the water

Class overview
- Builders: HESA
- Operators: Islamic Republic of Iran NavyIran
- In commission: 2012–present

General characteristics
- Type: Hovercraft
- Displacement: 11 tons (full load)
- Length: 17 m (56 ft)
- Beam: 8 m (26 ft)
- Draught: 6 m (20 ft)
- Speed: 50 knots (93 km/h; 58 mph)
- Range: 270 km
- Armament: Carrying 30 passengers

The Tondar (Persian:تندر meaning: Thunderbolt) is a hovercraft designed and manufactured by Iran. The Islamic Republic of Iran Navy is equipped with two variants of this craft, one for combat and one for transport missions, of which the Tondar is the combat type. General Ahmad Vahidi unveiled it in a ceremony in November 2012. According to the Fars news agency, the Tondar can be used with different types of weapons, including rockets, guns and can also launch UAVs.

== Unveiling ==
On November 12, 2012, the Tondar hovercraft was introduced in Bandar Abbas, attended by Ahmad Vahidi, who was the Minister of Defense and Support of the Armed Forces at that time. This hovercraft carrier was produced at the Iranian Aircraft Industries (HESA) located in Isfahan and was delivered to the Islamic Republic of Iran Navy on November 28, 2012, for use in amphibious operations. Vahidi highlighted that the technology for hovercraft production has been localized within the country, asserting that the Islamic Republic of Iran possesses the capability to manufacture all varieties of hovercraft.

== Specifications ==
The Tondar hovercraft weighs 11 tons, measures 17 meters in length, 8 meters in width, and 6 meters in height. It can achieve speeds exceeding 90 kilometers per hour and has a range of roughly 270 kilometers. The structure and body of this hovercraft are constructed using both metal and non-metallic composite materials.

== Capabilities ==
This hovercraft can operate on the sea, along the coast, and in marshy regions. The Tondar hovercraft serves various purposes, including coastal patrol, command vessel operations, offensive reconnaissance missions, and mid-range amphibious land defense. It also participates in asymmetric defense operations, facilitates the transportation of personnel and equipment for logistical support to islands and coasts, and functions as a sea ambulance for search and rescue missions. Additionally, this hovercraft is designed to traverse challenging terrains such as marshy areas, sand, reed beds, and shallow flooded surfaces, as well as to navigate through shallow mined zones without requiring coastal equipment.

The Tondar hovercraft can transport approximately 60 marines and deploy them onto the beach. Equipped with 107 mm rockets, this hovercraft can target coastal installations. In addition to its rocket capabilities, the Tondar possesses advanced reconnaissance features, as it can independently launch drones for both reconnaissance and attack missions. Furthermore, the Tondar is outfitted with anti-ship cruise missiles, providing it with considerable offensive strength. Anti-ship missiles are regarded as some of the most effective weapons for engaging enemy ships. The missile can be directed by a radar system located on top of the hovercraft, enhancing its operational range. Another characteristic of the Iranian Tondar hovercraft is its exceptional camouflage abilities. The Tondar can depart from any location briefly to launch its diverse arsenal, including anti-ship cruise missiles, before reverting to stealth mode.

== See also ==
- Bavar 2
- SR.N6
- British Hovercraft Corporation BH.7
