= List of submarine classes in service =

The list of submarine classes in service includes all submarine classes currently in service with navies or other armed forces worldwide. For surface combatants, see the list of naval ship classes in service.

== Ballistic missile submarines ==
Class	Builder	Displacement (tonnes)	Operator	In service	Built	Under construction	Comments
Arihant class (Project ATV)	India	7,000	Indian Navy	3	4	0	
Borei class (Project 955 Borey)	Russia	24,000	Russian Navy	8	8	2	Total of 12 planned
Delta class (Project 667BDR Kal'mar / 667BDRM Del'fin)	Soviet Union / Russia	18,200	Russian Navy	7	9	0	Including 1 ex-Delta III & 1 ex-Delta IV in special operations roles
Type 094A/094	China	11,000	People's Liberation Army Navy	6	6	2	
Ohio class (SSBN-726)	United States	18,750	United States Navy	14	18	0	24 planned 6 cancelled, 4 converted to SSGN
Triomphant class	France	14,335	French Navy	4	4	0	
Vanguard class	United Kingdom	15,900	Royal Navy	4	4	0	

== Cruise missile submarines ==
Class	Builder	Displacement (tonnes)	Operator	In service	Built	Under construction	Comments
Ohio class (Tactical Trident)	United States	18,750	United States Navy	4	4	0	converted from SSBN
Oscar class (Project 949 Granit/Project 949A Antey)	Soviet Union / Russia	19,400	Russian Navy	6	14	0	some being modernized, some inactive/reserve, 1 lost at sea
Type 093 submarine (Type 093G)	China	7,000	People's Liberation Army Navy	1	1	0	Only G variant of the Shang-class submarine is capable of launching guided cruise missiles
Yasen class	Russia	13,800	Russian Navy	5	6	3	Also classified as an SSN; Boat 6 on sea trials as of 2025; total of 12 planned

== Nuclear-powered attack submarines ==
Class	Builder	Displacement Tonnes	Operator	In Service	Built	Under Construction	Comments
Akula class (Project 971 Shchuka)	Soviet Union / Russia	13,800	Russian Navy	3	15	0	6 undergoing modernization/otherwise inactive
Astute class	United Kingdom	7,400	Royal Navy	5	6	1	Boat 6 (Agamemnon) commissioned but on sea trials as of September 2026
Barracuda class	France	5,300	French Navy	4	4	2	Total of 6 planned
Type 091 submarine	China	4,500	People's Liberation Army Navy	3	5	0	
Los Angeles class (SSN-688)	United States	7,000	United States Navy	24	62	0	35 submarines retired
Rubis class	France	2,670	French Navy	1	6	0	5 retired
Seawolf class (SSN-21)	United States	9,300	United States Navy	3	3	0	29 originally planned, 3rd in class built substantially modified for special missions
Type 093	China	8,000	People's Liberation Army Navy	6	6	0	
Sierra class (Project 945)	Soviet Union / Russia	10,400	Russian Navy	2	4	0	2 reserve/undergoing modernization
Victor class	Soviet Union / Russia	7,250	Russian Navy	2	48	0	46 retired
Virginia class	United States	7,900-10,200	United States Navy	22	24	9	66 planned

== Non-nuclear attack submarines with air-independent propulsion (AIP) ==
- Agosta-90B class submarine
  - Builder: France / Pakistan
  - Displacement: 2,050 tons
  - Operators: Pakistan Navy: 3 in service
- Hangor-class submarine
  - Builder: China / Pakistan
  - Displacement: ~2,800 tons
  - Operators: Pakistan Navy: 1 in service, 7 on order (3 undergoing trials/fitting out, 4 under construction)
- Blekinge class
  - Builder: Sweden,
  - Displacement: 1,800 tons
  - Operators: Swedish Navy: 2 building
- Dolphin class (Dolphin-2; AIP-variant)
  - Builder: Germany
  - Displacement: 1,900 tons
  - Operator: Israeli Navy: 3 AIP in-service/in-delivery, 3 AIP ordered
- Gotland class
  - Builder: Sweden,
  - Displacement: 1,647 tons
  - Operators: Swedish Navy: 3 in service
- Chinese Submarine 201
  - Builder: China
  - Displacement: 6,628 tons
  - Operator: People's Liberation Army Navy: 1 in service
- S-80 Plus class
  - Builder: Spain
  - Displacement: 3,426 tons
  - Operator: Spanish Navy: 1 in service; 3 more building
- Scorpène class
  - Builder: France / Spain
  - Displacement: 1,590 tons
  - Operator:
    - Brazilian Navy: 4 ordered/building
    - Chilean Navy: 2 in service
    - Indian Navy: 6 in service, 3 ordered, known as Kalvari-class submarine
    - Royal Malaysian Navy: 2 in service
    - Indonesian Navy: 2 ordered
- Sōryū class
  - Builder: Japan
  - Displacement: 4,200 tons
  - Operators: Japan Maritime Self-Defense Force: 12 in service, last two boats not equipped with AIP in favour of larger battery
- Type 212 submarine
  - Builders: Germany / Italy
  - Displacement: 1,830/2,500 tons ("A" or "CD" variant)
  - Operators:
    - German Navy: 6 in service (A), 2 more ordered (CD)
    - Marina Militare: 4 in service (A), 3 more ordered with option for a fourth (A) – known as the Todaro-class
    - Royal Norwegian Navy: 4 ordered (CD)
- Type 214 submarine
  - Builder: Germany
  - Displacement: 1,980 tons
  - Operators:
    - Hellenic Navy: 4 in service
    - Republic of Korea Navy: 8 in service, 1 building/ordered
    - Portuguese Navy: 2 in service
    - Turkish Navy: 1 in service, 1 under trials, 4 building
- Västergötland class / Archer class
  - Builder: Sweden
  - Displacement: 1,145 tons
  - Operator:
    - Swedish Navy: 2 in service
    - Republic of Singapore Navy: 2 on a delivery program
- Type 039A/B/C / Hangor-class
  - Builder: China
  - Displacement: 3,600 tons
  - Operator:
    - People's Liberation Army Navy: 17 in service, 3 building
    - Pakistan Navy: 4 building, 3 under trials, 1 in service
    - Royal Thai Navy: 1 building

== Diesel-electric attack submarines ==
- Agosta class
  - Builder: France / Spain
  - Displacement: 1,725 tons
  - Operators:
    - Pakistan Navy: 2 in service
    - Spanish Navy: 1 in service
- Collins class
  - Builder: Australia
  - Displacement: 3,050 tons
  - Operator: Royal Australian Navy: 6 in service
- Dolphin class (Dolphin-1; non-AIP variant)
  - Builder: Germany
  - Displacement: 1,900 tons
  - Operator: Israeli Navy: 3 non-AIP in-service
- Kilo class (Project 877 Paltus and Project 636)
  - Builder: Soviet Union / Russia
  - Displacement: 3,100 tons
  - Operators:
    - Indian Navy: 8 Kilo, 1 decommissioned, 1 transferred to Myanmar Navy, known as the Sindhughosh class
    - People's Liberation Army Navy: 2 Kilo and 10 Improved Kilo in service
    - Russian Navy: 5 original Kilo (877) in service (up to 4 more status unclear), 12? Improved Kilo (636.3) in service (one possibly destroyed in dry dock by missile strike), 4 Improved Kilo building/ordered
    - Algerian National Navy: 2 Original Kilo and 4 Improved Kilo
    - Polish Navy: 1 Kilo
    - Islamic Republic of Iran Navy: 3 Kilo
    - Romanian Naval Forces: 1 Kilo no longer active; used for dockside training
    - Vietnam People's Navy: 6 Improved Kilo in service
    - Myanmar Navy: 1 Kilo transferred from Indian Navy
- Lada class (Project 677 Lada)
  - Builder: Russia
  - Displacement: 2,700 tons
  - Operators: Russian Navy: 1st boat decommissioned for scrapping; 2nd & 3rd in service as of 2025; 2 more building/ordered; more planned (AIP propulsion originally considered but, according to shipbuilder, not incorporated)
- Type 035 submarine
  - Builder: China
  - Displacement: 2,100 tons
  - Operator:
    - People's Liberation Army Navy: 14 in service
    - Bangladesh Navy: 2 in service
    - Myanmar Navy: 1 in service
- Oyashio class
  - Builder: Japan
  - Displacement: 4,000 tons
  - Operator: Japan Maritime Self-Defense Force: 11 in service, 2 as training ships
- Romeo class (Type 033)
  - Builder: China
  - Displacement: 1,810 tons
  - Operators:
    - Egyptian Navy: 4 in service
    - Korean People's Navy: 20 in service, 1 has been modified to launch ballistic missiles
- Sauro class
  - Builder: Italy
  - Displacement: 1,653 tons
  - Operator: Marina Militare: 4 in service
- Type 039 submarine
  - Builder: China
  - Displacement: 2,250 tons
  - Operator: People's Liberation Army Navy: 13 in service
- Taigei class
  - Builder: Japan
  - Displacement: 4,300 tons
  - Operator: Japan Maritime Self-Defense Force: 1 launched, 7 planned ― equipped with Lithium-ion batteries
- TR-1700 class
  - Builder: Germany
  - Displacement: 2116 tons
  - Operators:Argentine Navy: 1 (S-41) inactive (laid up); 2nd boat (S-42) sunk with all hands lost.
- Type 209 submarine
  - Builder: Germany
  - Displacement: 1,230/1,290/1,586 tons
  - Operators:
    - Argentine Navy: 1 inactive (used for dockside training)
    - Brazilian Navy: 5 in service
    - Chilean Navy: 2 in service
    - Colombian National Navy: 2 in service
    - Egyptian Navy: 4 in service
    - Ecuadorian Navy: 2 in service
    - Hellenic Navy: 6 in service
    - Indian Navy: 4 in service
    - Indonesian Navy: 4 in service; 1 (402) lost with all hands in April 2021
    - Peruvian Navy: 6 in service
    - South African Navy: 3 in service
    - Republic of Korea Navy: 9 in service
    - Turkish Navy: 12 in service
    - Bolivarian Navy of Venezuela: 2 (operational status unclear)
- Ula class (Type 210)
  - Builder: Germany
  - Displacement: 1,150 tons
  - Operator: Royal Norwegian Navy: 6 in service
- Victoria class (SSK 876)
  - Builder: United Kingdom
  - Displacement: 2,400 tons
  - Operator: Royal Canadian Navy: 4 in service
- Walrus class
  - Builder: Netherlands
  - Displacement: 2,800 tons
  - Operator: Royal Netherlands Navy: 3 in service; 1 retired
- Zwaardvis class
  - Builder: Netherlands
  - Displacement: 2,600 tons
  - Operator: Republic of China Navy: 2 in service
- Sang-O class
  - Builder: North Korea
  - Displacement: 370 tons
  - Operator: Korean People's Navy: 40 in service
- Sinpo class
  - Builder: North Korea
  - Displacement: 2,000 tons
  - Operator: Korean People's Navy: 1 in service
- Fateh class
  - Builder: Iran
  - Displacement: 593 tons
  - Operator: Islamic Republic of Iran Navy: 1 in service
- Type 206 submarine
  - Builder: Germany
  - Displacement: 500 tons
  - Operators:
    - Colombian National Navy : 2 in service
- Hai Kun-class submarine
  - Builder: Republic of China
  - Displacement: c. 2500 tons
  - Operators:
    - Republic of China Navy: 1 trialing, 7 planned

== Midget submarines ==
- Yugo class
  - Builder: North Korea
  - Displacement: 90 up to 110 tons
  - Operator: Korean People's Navy: unknown; Cuban Revolutionary Navy: 1;Vietnam People's Navy: unknown (reported in inventory as of 2019)
- Yono class
  - Builder: North Korea
  - Displacement: 130 tons
  - Operator: Korean People's Navy: <36 in service
- Ghadir class
  - Builder: Iran
  - Displacement: 115 tons
  - Operator: Islamic Republic of Iran Navy: 21 in service
- Nahang class
  - Builder: Iran
  - Displacement: 350-400 tons
  - Operator: Islamic Republic of Iran Navy: 1 in service
- Cosmos-class
  - Builder: Pakistan
  - Displacement: 110 tons
  - Operator: Pakistan Navy: 3 in service

== Special mission submarines ==
- Belgorod (K-329)
  - Builder: Sevmash
  - Displacement: 24,000/30,000 tonnes submerged
  - Operator: Russian Navy
- Losharik
  - Builder: Sevmash
  - Displacement: c. 2,000 tonnes submerged
  - Operator: Russian Navy
- LR5 Deep submersible
  - Builder: United Kingdom
  - Displacement: 21 tons
  - Operator: Royal Navy (leased to Royal Australian Navy)
- NSRS Deep submergence rescue vehicle
  - Builder: United Kingdom
  - Displacement: 41 tons
  - Operator: Royal Navy (available for NATO)
- Mystic-class deep sea rescue submersible (DSRV-1)
  - Builder: United States
  - Displacement: 37 tons
  - Operator: United States Navy: 1 in service
- Paltus-class special mission submarine (Project 1083.1)
  - Builder: Russia
  - Displacement: 730 tons
  - Operator: Russian Navy
- Uniform-class special mission submarine (Project 1910 Kashalot)
  - Builder: Soviet Union / Russia
  - Displacement: 1,580 tons
  - Operator: Russian Navy
- Sarov (B-90)
  - Builder: Krasnoye Sormovo Shipyard and Sevmash
  - Displacement: c. 4,000 tonnes submerged
  - Operator: Russian Navy
- Al-Sabehat swimmer delivery vehicle
  - Builder: Iran
  - Operator: Islamic Republic of Iran Navy
- VAS 525 mini-submarine
  - Builder: GSE Trieste Italy
  - Operator: Bolivarian Navy of Venezuela: 1+?

== Summary ==
Navy	Ballistic-missile submarine	Cruise-missile submarine	Nuclear-powered attack submarine	Diesel-electric attack submarine	Midget submarine	Main article
Algerian National Navy				6		Current force
Royal Australian Navy				6		Current force
Bangladesh Navy				2		Current force
Brazilian Navy				7?		Current force
Royal Canadian Navy				4		Current force
Chilean Navy				4		Current force
People's Liberation Army Navy	6	1	6	46?		Current force
Colombian National Navy				4		Current force
Cuban Revolutionary Navy					1	Current force
Ecuadorian Navy				2		Current force
Egyptian Navy				8		Current force
French Navy	4		5			Current force
German Navy				6		Current force
Hellenic Navy				10		Current force
Indian Navy	3			17		Current force
Indonesian Navy				4		Current force
Islamic Republic of Iran Navy				4	unclear	Current force
Israeli Navy				6 (including one being delivered as of 2026)		Current force
Italian Navy				8		Current force
Japan Maritime Self-Defense Force				22		Current force
Royal Malaysian Navy				2		Current force
Myanmar Navy				2		Current force
Royal Netherlands Navy				3		Current force
Korean People's Navy	1?	1?		21?	51?	Current force
Royal Norwegian Navy				6		Current force
Pakistan Navy				6 (+7 under construction)	3	Current force
Peruvian Navy				6		Current force
Polish Navy				1		Current force
Portuguese Navy				2		Current force
Russian Navy	13	11	13 SSNs (of which c. 5 active) & c. 9 nuclear special ops boats	c. 19		Current force
Republic of Singapore Navy				4		Current force
South African Navy				3		Current force
Republic of Korea Navy				20		Current force
Spanish Navy				2		Current force
Swedish Navy				5		Current force
Republic of China Navy				4 (+1 trialing)		Current force
Turkish Navy				13		Current force
Royal Navy	4		6			Current Force
United States Navy	14	4	49			Current force
Bolivarian Navy of Venezuela				2?	1+?	Current force
Vietnam People's Navy				6		Current force

== See also ==
- List of submarine operators
- List of naval ship classes in service
- List of auxiliary ship classes in service
