= Islamic Republic of Iran Navy Aviation =

Aviation component of the Iranian navy

- هواپیمایی نیروی دریایی آجا
- Country: Iran
- Branch: Islamic Republic of Iran Navy
- Type: Naval aviation
- Size: ≈2,600 (2020)

Insignia
- Patch

- Roundel

- Fin flash

The Islamic Republic of Iran Navy Aviation (IRINA) (Persian: هواپیمایی نیروی دریایی آجا) or Havadarya (هوادریا) is the air component of the Islamic Republic of Iran Navy. It is one of the few air elements in any Persian Gulf navy, and has both fixed-wing aircraft and armed helicopters.

== Aircraft ==
American aircraft types were acquired in the 1960s and 1970, with European made aircraft comprising the more modern part of the fleet.

Aircraft	Type	Variants	In service	Notes	Image
Sikorsky CH-53 Sea Stallion	Airborne Mine CounterMeasures (AMCM)/Heavy-lift transport helicopter	RH-53D	13	Supplemented by United States Navy examples that were abandoned by US forces during Operation Eagle Claw and used as spare parts source. It is believed that Iran got additional spare parts in black market in 2006-8 and up to six original plus one Eagle Claw RH-53Ds may be operational.	
Sikorsky SH-3 Sea King	Anti-submarine warfare/Anti-surface warfare/Medium-lift utility helicopter	ASH-3D	8	Built by Agusta, in Italy. Armed with locally produced anti-shipping missiles. Operational helicopters overhauled locally.	
Mil Mi-17	Anti-surface warfare/Medium-lift transport helicopter	Mi-171 (Mi-8AMTSh) 'Hip'	45	Mil Mi-171 helicopters were purchased from Russia.	
Bell UH-1N Twin Huey	Anti-submarine warfare/Anti-surface warfare/Light transport helicopter	AB 212ASW	21	Built by Agusta, in Italy. Operational number unknown. Iran is producing spare parts locally for its Bell helicopters, used by all Armed Forces branches.	
Fokker F27 Friendship	Transport aircraft	F27-400M	3	One aircraft is the maritime patrol aircraft variant.	
Dassault Falcon 20	Transport aircraft/VIP transport	Mystère/Falcon 20E	1		
Do-228	Transport aircraft	Do-228	5	Built in Germany.	
Shrike Commander 690	Transport aircraft	Shrike Commander 690	4	Built in the United States.	
