= Nahang-class submarine =

Class of Iranian submarine

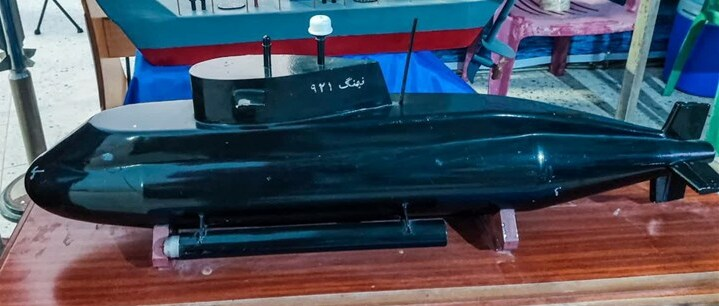

Class overview
- Name: Nahang
- Builders: Marine Industries Organization
- Operators: Islamic Republic of Iran Navy
- Succeeded by: Ghadir class
- Completed: 1
- Canceled: 2
- Active: 1

General characteristics
- Type: Midget submarine
- Length: ≈ 25 m (82 ft)
- Beam: ≈ 3 m (9.8 ft)
- Draft: ≈ 2.5 m (8 ft 2 in)

The Nahang (Persian: نهنگ, lit. 'Whale') is an Iranian-made class of midget submarine designed for shallow water operations. Only one prototype of this class is known to be completed, although its characteristics have remained unclear.

== History ==
Iran had shown interest in midget submarines in the 1980s. According to Conway's All The World's Fighting Ships, Iran assembled a midget in Bandar Abbas that was completed in 1987 in an unsuccessful attempt. Iran reportedly purchased a second midget of another design from North Korea, delivered in 1988. It is alleged that by 1993, nine midget submarines –able to displace 76 tons surfaced and 90 tons submerged, with a top speed between 8 knots (15 km/h; 9.2 mph) and 12 knots (22 km/h; 14 mph)– were imported from North Korea.

The existence of the Nahang was first known in April 2006. On 6 March 2006, Iranian state television announced that Nahang 1 had been commissioned into the Southern Fleet. In August that year, she participated in the third phase of Zarbat-e Zolfaghar military exercises.

Two other submarines in the class were allegedly planned, but building further units is considered unlikely.

In April 2017, Bellingcat reported that for the first time in years, satellite imagery suggested that Nahang had been deployed for a mission.

== Description ==
There is not much confidently known about characteristics of the class. According to Jane's Fighting Ships, the class displaces 100 tonnes (98 long tons) when at the surface and 115 tonnes (113 long tons) while submerged. Alternate estimates for surfaced and submerged displacement are 110 tonnes (110 long tons) and 127 tonnes (125 long tons) respectively while the number given goes as high as 500 tonnes (490 long tons).

Jane's mentions the approximate dimensions as 25 m (82 ft) for length, with a beam of 3 m (9.8 ft) and a draft of 2.5 m (8 ft 2 in). 8 knots (15 km/h; 9.2 mph) and 13 knots (24 km/h; 15 mph) are top speeds reported for the submarine. Nahang is reportedly unarmed and not fitted with torpedoes, however there are contradicting reports suggesting it has a pair of 533mm torpedo tubes in drop collars and can carry and lay four MDM-6 or EM-52 naval mines. Nahang may be utilized as a mothership for swimmer delivery vehicles and a platform for special operations.

The submarine has no sonar on the report of Jane's, but another account suggests that she is equipped with active/passive sonar on her bow. The machinery installed for propulsion is unknown. Other apparatus reportedly installed include a mast with electronic warfare support capabilities (similar to Russian-made 'Stop Light' type) and surface search and navigation radar.

== See also ==
- List of submarine classes in service
- List of naval ship classes of Iran
- List of military equipment manufactured in Iran
