= Great Prophet XIV =

- Type: Military exercise
- Locations: Persian Gulf; 26.523892°N 56.382047°E; Strait of Hormuz; 26.292639°N 54.501778°E
- Commanded by: Maj. Gen. Hossein Salami
- Date: 28–30 July 2020
- Executed by: IRGC Navy; IRGC Aerospace Force

The Great Prophet XIV (Persian: پیامبر اعظم ۱۴) was an Iranian military exercise that took place in the Persian Gulf region from 28 to 30 July 2020, involving the Navy and the Aerospace Force of the Islamic Revolutionary Guard Corps (IRGC).

== Major events ==
=== Underground missile tests ===
During the exercise, Iran fired underground ballistic missiles for the first time, claiming carrying out such an operation for "the first time in the world".

=== Su-22 bombings ===
During the exercise, Sukhoi Su-22 fighter jets bombed predetermined targets on Faror Island. The Sukhoi Su-22s are based at Shiraz, 500 kilometers away from the Strait of Hormuz and had been overhauled two years earlier, after decades of being grounded. The aircraft also released glide bombs against naval targets.

=== Attacks on replica aircraft carrier ===
Iran had repaired its replica of a Nimitz-class aircraft carrier –which had suffered significant damage during the Great Prophet IX five years earlier– before the exercise. Satellite images provided by Maxar Technologies suggested that the mock carrier –carrying 16 mock-ups of fighter jets on its deck– was pulled by a tugboat on 27 July to the drill site.

The mock carrier was described as "sunk while under tow back to base".

== Aftermath ==
On 29 July, firing a ballistic missile resulted in American troops –stationed at Al Udeid Air Base (located in Qatar) and Al Dhafra Air Base (located in United Arab Emirates)– seeking cover, while the two bases were kilometers away from the exercise site.

== Reactions ==
Cmdr. Rebecca Rebarich, a spokesperson for the United States Fifth Fleet said "[w]hile we are always watchful of this type of irresponsible and reckless behavior by Iran in the vicinity of busy international waterways, this exercise has not disrupted coalition operations in the area nor had any impacts to the free flow of commerce in the Strait of Hormuz and surrounding waters".

== See also ==
- Joint Exercise Zolfaghar 99, Islamic Republic of Iran Army drill in the same year
