= Iranian anti-access and area denial strategy in the Strait of Hormuz =

Iran's anti-access/area denial (A2/AD) strategy in the Strait of Hormuz mixes advanced technology with guerilla tactics to deny, deter or delay foreign forces access and maritime freedom of maneuver. The regular attempt by adversaries to deny one another freedom of movement on the battlefield can be observed throughout history . What makes anti-access/area-denial nowadays different from the past is the rapid improvement in military and communication technology in recent decades and new ways of implementing these strategies that such technology creates. Most scholarly attention seems to have gone to Chinese anti-access/area denial (A2/AD) capabilities, most likely because modern military technology is required to uphold A2/AD, it is almost always exclusively practiced by advanced regional powers like China. The A2/AD portfolio leverages diplomatic, information, military, and economic (DIME) activities. The focus of the Iranian A2/AD threat in the Strait of Hormuz is limited to the military dimension.

Historically, A2/AD strategies have been employed by several different actors over time but they are particularly attractive when geography and/or political circumstances support them. Most often, the force implementing A2/AD strategies is the strategically weaker force. That is, when implementing this strategy, one does not have to be the strongest force, just strong enough to prevent the other force from gaining access to the theater of operations they seek to conquer. A2/AD concepts have been presented interchangeably as asymmetric defensive and offensive measures restricting military freedom of movement of forces already into theatre, thereby utilizing attack aircraft, warships, and specialized ballistic and cruise missiles designed to strike key targets, which is anti-access, and denying the freedom of movement of forces already there, employing more defensive means, that is area denial. Conceptualizations vary in their scope or their focus either on the strategic or operational level.

== The A2/AD threat in the Strait of Hormuz ==
A decisive factor in A2/AD strategies is geography. However, a specific geography is not a necessary component of an A2/AD strategy, it can prove helpful for particular operations on land and sea as geographical chokepoints and difficult terrain provide favorable opportunities for A2/AD operations. Maritime chokepoints lend themselves well into anti-access measures and make it easier to implement area denial strategies. An anti- access strategy is easiest to implement when there are limited ways to reach the target under the best circumstances. In littoral areas within a few hundred miles of the coast, like the Strait of Hormuz, there are a number of A2/AD capabilities forces could make use of. For instance, Krepinevich concept of A2/AD is to describe the threat posed by long-range missile systems, precision munitions, and satellite technology that will make military operations in the littoral areas challenging for naval forces. Demonstrated or available A2/AD systems include over-the- horizon targeting systems, long-range strike aircraft, anti-ship cruise missiles and in some way ballistic missiles, submarines and missile-firing surface combatants, swarming fast attack craft, mines, and coastal defense artillery. Additionally, integrated air defenses seek to prevent naval strike aircraft, aerial delivery platforms, and land-attack cruise missiles. Iran holds an advantageous geographic position at the Strait of Hormuz that allows it to control the northern shore of the maritime chokepoint. Iran’s enviable geographic position astride the Strait gives it a range of options for delaying movements through the Strait. The geographical features of the Persian Gulf region combined with Iran’s weakness in a direct military competition with a considerably stronger force suggests that Iran will pursue an asymmetric hybrid A2/AD strategy that mixes advanced technology with guerilla tactics to deny the foreign forces access and freedom of maneuver.

The Iranian military complex includes a variety of weapons that could be used to deny access to the Persian Gulf. It includes ballistic missiles that can reach targets across the Persian Gulf region, anti-ship cruise missiles, a variety of mines, fast attack craft, and other advanced weaponry to exert their control over the Strait of Hormuz. Iran might pursue an A2/AD strategy suited to its relatively modest resources and geographic and geostrategic attributes of the region. Teheran would seek to impose costs on a foreign force by using a layered approach that begins with offensive strikes over long ranges and culminates with defenses that increase in intensity with a foreign forces approach. An Iranian military campaign, attempting to sabotage or block the passage would depend on its ability to coordinate the use of mines, anti-ship cruise missiles, and air defense to create a littoral trap for any intervening force. Iran would start by laying minefields in and around the Strait's shipping channels, as well as using anti-ship cruise missiles against merchant traffic and any foreign force mine countermeasure and convoy vessels.

The geography of the waterway plays an important role for the Iranian Navy and Iranian Revolutionary Guard Corps Navy to exploit its features for their A2/AD strategy. The Strait provides a very narrow entrance to the Persian Gulf. It is approximately 180-kilometer- long and at its narrowest point 40 kilometers wide and probably no more than 60 meters at its deepest. It contains two shipping lanes for large vessels, each 3.2 km wide, with a 3.2-kilometer- wide buffer zone between them. The northern channel is within only a few dozen kilometers of the Iranian coast.

For Teheran’s navies that means that they would benefit from very short lines of communications. The proximity of the Strait of Hormuz to major Iranian port facilities, such as Bandar Abbas, would permit Iran’s large inventory of small boats, fast attack craft, and fast inshore attack craft equipped with naval mines to rapidly engage or disengage from maritime exclusion operations. Iran has developed a guerilla warfare strategy intended to exploit the perceived weaknesses of traditional naval forces that rely on large vessels. Furthermore, the geography of the waterway enables Iran to use smart mines, small boats swarming attacks, short-range unmanned aerial vehicles, and shore-based anti-ship missiles to deny military and civilian vessels safe passage. The Gulf's acoustic conditions and relative shallowness may also degrade anti-submarine warfare.

=== Iranian mine warfare ===
Naval mines are essentially a defensive weapon employed for access denial where their operator is seeking to manipulate the movement of enemy forces by restricting access to critical spaces. Mine warfare plays a crucial part in the Iranian A2/AD strategy. By deploying mines, the Iranians intend to slow and disrupt the movement of maritime forces operating in the Strait’s relatively restricted waters, making ships easier to target.

Iran is believed to possess around 6000 mines. It is one of two dozen nations that can manufacture mines domestically. Naval mines can be adapted for use against specific target sets – different types of naval mine are defined according to their actuation triggers. Different types are defined according to their actuation triggers and the position in the water they are designed to be laid. Iran possesses or produces bottom-moored contact mines (which were used extensively during the Tanker War), moored and bottom-influence mines incorporating magnetic, acoustic, and pressure fuses, limpet mines, drifting mines, and remotely controlled mines.

Iran might deploy its less sophisticated mines from a variety of surface vessels, while it reserves its submarine force to lay influence mines covertly. The primary goal is to deny passage and force foreign forces to engage in prolonged mine countermeasure operations while under threat from Iranian shore-based attacks. The ability of Iranian forces to rapidly deploy mines depends in variables related to its minelaying platforms. For the types of mines, Iran possesses, submarines represent the best mine-laying platforms using high-speed small boats. Besides small speedboats and submarines, nondescript civilian vessels manned by military crews to covertly mine shipping corridors and harbor entrances, would additionally be used as minelaying platforms.

=== Anti-ship cruise missiles in the Strait of Hormuz ===
Iran possesses a large number of shore-, ship-based, and air-launched anti-ship missiles and anti-ship cruise missiles. These assets include shore batteries of anti-ship cruise missiles near the Strait, along its coast and on its islands in the Gulf, many of which are on mobile launchers. Many of Iran’s missiles can be deployed on the smaller, harder to detect, and more expendable ships and boats, some could be remotely targeted by maritime patrol aircraft or unmanned aerial vehicles. While many of its missiles are relatively short-ranged, the Strait of Hormuz is only 40 km wide at its narrowest point, and Iran has many islands near the shipping channels. Smaller ships and boats are harder to detect by radar, and Iran might mount some missiles on commercial ships – a tactic it has practised with other types of missiles. Iran’s primary naval platforms for delivering anti-ship cruise missiles are its fast missile boats. Nevertheless, Iran may have put some of its missiles on relatively vulnerable platforms such as inland truck-mounted batteries. The maximum effective range of Iran’s anti-ship cruise missiles may be limited more by their target acquisition radars than their onboard fuel capacity. This suggests that, in keeping with its asymmetric maritime strategy, Iran could use target data from submarines, small military and civilian vessels, and unmanned aerial vehicles, under the condition that these platforms have precision navigation and the ability to communicate with shore-based anti-ship cruise missile batteries. Iran would deploy its land-based ASCM from camouflaged and hardened sites to firing positions along its coastline and on Iranian-occupied islands in the Strait of Hormuz while placing decoys at false firing positions to complicate countermeasures. Although Iran’s long-range coastal artillery and shore-based anti-ship missiles can provide some level of area denial over substantial parts of the Strait, surface vessels are required to control the Gulf. However, significant uncertainties exist regarding the types, numbers, and performance characteristics of missiles in Iran’s inventory; how many mobile launchers; how they are located across naval versus land-based or air-based platforms.

=== Air defense over Iran ===
Air defense systems are yet another part of Iran’s multi-layered A2/AD complex in the Strait of Hormuz. Iran’s most effective and efficient means of defending its airspace are land-based air defense systems.

As with much of its military equipment, Iran’s air defense network is a mix of older Western and newer, generally Russian-designed, systems. Iran's ability to defend its airspace with fighter aircraft is limited. Iranian land-based air defense capabilities pose a more persistent threat. Iran has devoted considerable resources and attention to its land-based air defenses in recent years. Iran operates a diverse array of surface-to-air missiles and radar systems intended to defend critical sites from attack by a technologically superior air force. Iranian air defenses are a central element of its deterrent capabilities. It enhances the freedom of action of its own air and naval forces, and its offensive capabilities. When confronted with highly-developed air forces and lacking a capable air force of its own, Iran has chosen to deny its enemies the ability to achieve air superiority through its use of ground-based air defenses

The common denominator in the debate surrounding Iran’s air defense capabilities is, that, massed together, Iran’s air defenses provide Teheran with a degree of deterrence because they increase the difficulty, expense and time to launch air attacks on Iran and with that Iran could potentially place an A2/AD umbrella over the Strait of Hormuz. However, Iran surface-to-air missile and radar systems show deficiencies that make them vulnerable to concerted actions by foreign powers. For example, considering the country's size and the number of sites Iran presumably wants to defend, the numbers are relatively low. Another deficiency manifests itself in the monitoring and communication structure, that Iran has at its disposal to bring different areas and points together to an integrated air defense system
