= Ghadir-class submarine =

Class of midget submarine

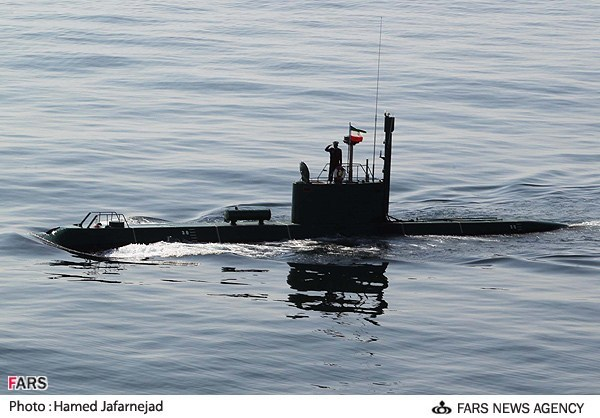

Class overview
- Name: Ghadir
- Builders: Marine Industries Organization
- Operators: Islamic Republic of Iran Navy
- Preceded by: Nahang class
- In service: 2007–present
- Completed: 20
- Active: 20

General characteristics
- Type: Midget submarine
- Displacement: 117 tonnes surfaced; 125 tonnes submerged
- Length: 29 m (95 ft 2 in)
- Beam: 2.75 m (9 ft 0 in)
- Draught: 2.5 m (8 ft 2 in)
- Propulsion: Diesel-electric propulsion
- Speed: 10 knots (19 km/h; 12 mph) surfaced; 8 knots (15 km/h; 9.2 mph) submerged
- Complement: 7
- Armament: 2 × 533 mm (21 in) torpedo tubes

Ghadir (Persian: غدیر, pronounced [ɣædiːɾ]; named after the Ghadir Khumm) is a class of midget submarines built by Iran specifically for cruising within the shallow waters of the Persian Gulf. The Islamic Republic of Iran Navy is the sole operator of this class, whose submarines all serve in the Southern Fleet. No submarine of this class is active at the Northern Fleet, i.e., the Caspian Sea.

== History ==
Iran had shown interest in midget submarines in the 1980s. According to the Conway's All The World's Fighting Ships, Iran assembled a midget in Bandar Abbas that was completed in 1987 in an unsuccessful attempt. Iran reportedly purchased a second midget of another design from North Korea, delivered in 1988. It is alleged that by 1993, nine midget submarines –able to displace 76 tons surfaced and 90 tons submerged, with a top speed between 8 knots (15 km/h; 9.2 mph) and 12 knots (22 km/h; 14 mph)– were imported from North Korea.

The existence of Ghadir class was first known in February 2004. An unclassified 2017 report by the U.S. Office of Naval Intelligence stated that Iran purchased at least one Yono class submarine from North Korea in that year.

In May 2005, Iran announced that it has started mass production of its own indigenous midget submarines, and aired footage of one cruising surfaced on television. Later that month, the submarine was tested during the third phase of military exercise Ettehad 84. In November 2007, commander of the IRIN Commodore Habibollah Sayyari said the second boat in the class had been completed after ten years of construction. Iranian supreme leader Ali Khamenei was quoted saying to Iran's navy commanders on the day the submarine was launched: "Today, you have been able to design and build many of the military requirements. We have become self-sufficient from other countries."

In May 2014, submarine Ghadir 953 cruised in the Indian Ocean to make a port call to Karachi, Pakistan along with a naval group consisting of Falakhon, Khanjar, Hendijan and Deylam, participating in a joint drill with Pakistan Navy vessels.

== Design ==
Sources are inconsistent about the class which Ghadir submarines are derived from. When it was first unveiled, some experts pointed out that it is similar in appearance to Yugo-class submarines, while others said that they were about 1.5 times larger than the Yugos, and more similar to the Sang-O class. Other sources say they are based on the Yono class. Ghadir submarines displace 117 tonnes (115 long tons) surfaced, and 125 tonnes (123 long tons) submerged. The class design is 29 m (95 ft 2 in) long, would have a beam of 9 m (29 ft 6 in) and a draft of 8.2 m (26 ft 11 in). The submarines have a maximum surface speed of 10 knots (19 km/h; 12 mph) and a maximum submerged speed of 8 knots (15 km/h; 9.2 mph). They have a secondary retractable propeller are powered by diesel–electric machinery, and fitted with two 533 mm (21 in) torpedo tubes.

Submarines in the class are equipped with sonars of an unknown type. Ghadirs have a crew of seven.

== Operational capabilities ==
Video of a Ghadir firing a submarine-launched cruise missile in 2019

Ghadir submarines are said to have launched Valfajr and Hoot torpedoes. Anti-ship cruise missiles Nasr-1 and Jask-2 are both reportedly launched successfully, the latter being developed specifically for launch from submarines. The ships in the class are also capable of laying naval mines in addition to retrieving frogmen for special operations. They are assumed to have "an extremely limited endurance", and are described as "very maneuverable" and able to "sit silently submerged while waiting for its prey". Considering that Ghadir submarines could carry only two torpedoes or missiles, Joseph Trevithick writes that Iranians may plan to use them "en masse to launch barrages of the missiles".

Vijay Sakhuja, director of the National Maritime Foundation, comments that the class is "[the] most difficult to detect particularly when resting on the seabed and this could be the possible tactics that the Iranian Navy could employ during hostilities. Further, given their numbers, these could overwhelm enemy's technological superiority".

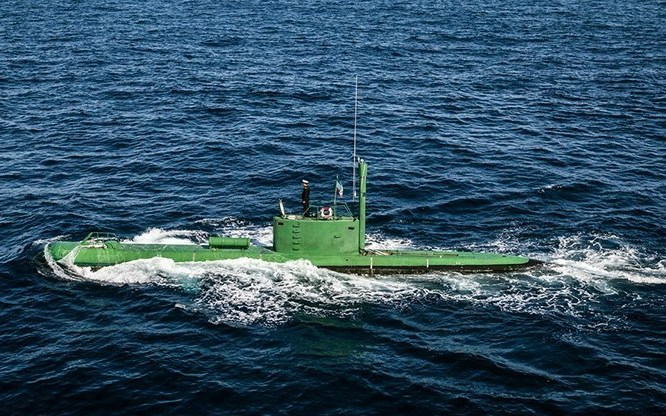
A Ghadir-class submarine underway during an Iranian naval exercise in 2016

According to U.S. Navy Captain Tracy A. Vincent, Ghadir submarines can provide additional surveillance capability and create a new layer of defense for Iranian naval forces. Commander Daniel Dolan maintains that the submarines are well-designed for the purpose of guerrilla warfare, ambush and anti-access/area denial (A2/AD), describing them as potentially more expendable than Kilo-class attack submarines. He argues that the U.S. fleet is prone to a high threat environment created by sheer number of these "small but lethal threats". Royal Navy Commander Ryan Ramsey, who captained nuclear submarine HMS Turbulent in the Persian Gulf, has said that the submarines are a threat to western forces operating in the region, adding that "[t]he Ghadir-class are tiny submarines but have enough torpedoes to sink a couple of ships".

Mark Episkopos opines that Ghadir submarines maintain "strong offensive capabilities" that contribute to the "dangerous" subsurface fleet of Iran.

IRIN commander Hossein Khanzadi has said the class "can do what the U-boats did during World War II". The purpose of building these submarines is not clear. It may have been done as a first step in being able to build submarines, and at the same time send a signal to other countries in the Gulf region with stronger navies. It also allows the Iranian Navy to train in submarine operations, and may help Iran to operate bigger submarines in the future.

== Number built ==
Iran does not disclose the number of its submarines. Sources differ in determining the number of Ghadir submarines built and operated, with estimates ranging between 10 and 21 units, as of 2019.

According to the 2020 edition of the Military Balance published by the International Institute of Strategic Studies (IISS), Iran operates 14 submarines in this class. Farzin Nadimi of The Washington Institute also estimated that about 20 were in service as of 2020.

On the report of Jane's Fighting Ships, one was lost in April 2014 during an exercise, while American military intelligence says she was reportedly sunk on patrol, possibly due to collision with rocks.

Anthony Cordesman wrote in 2016 that Iran has up to 17 Ghadir submarines.

In July 2026, one Ghadir-class submarine in Bandar Abbas was taken out by Saronic Corsair USVs.

=== Known commissionings ===
This list may be incomplete.

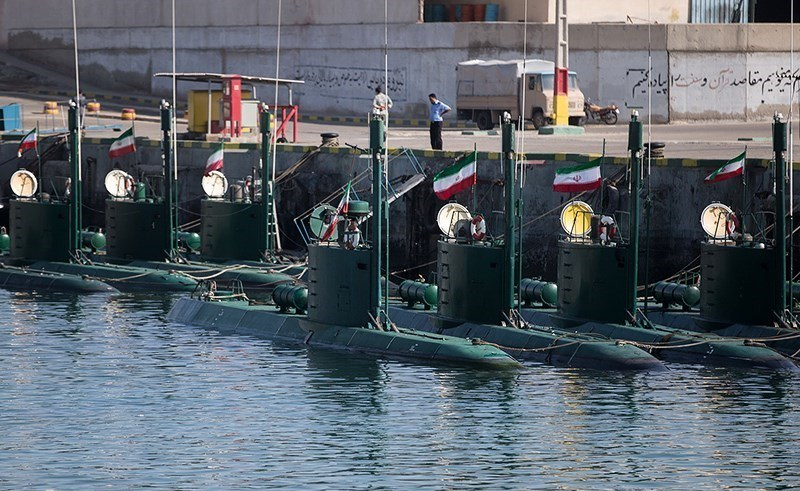
Eight Ghadir-class submarines moored in 2016

- May 2005: 1. (at least, more possible)
- 28 November 2007: 1.
- 27 November 2008: 1.
- 1 June 2009: 3.
- 28 November 2009: 2.
- 8 August 2010: 4.
- 26 November 2011: 3.
- 10 February 2012: 2.
- 28 November 2012: 2.
- 28 November 2018: 1. (pennant number 955)
- 5 September 2022: 1.

==== Recommissionings after overhaul ====
- 28 November 2018: 1. (pennant number 942)
- 8 April 2020: 1.

== See also ==
- List of submarine classes in service
- List of naval ship classes of Iran
- List of military equipment manufactured in Iran
