= Jask-2 =

Type of SLCM

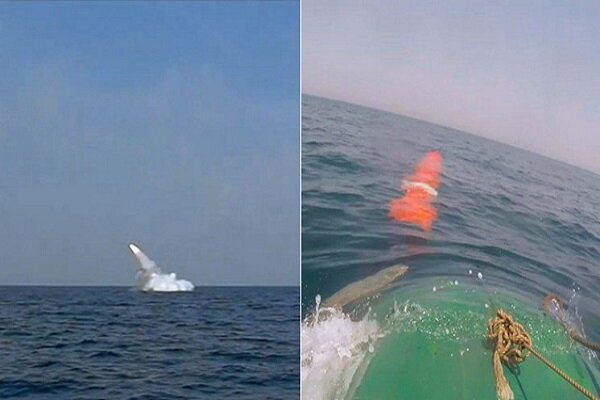
- Type: SLCM
- Place of origin: Iran

Service history
- In service: 2020-present
- Used by: Iran

Production history
- Designer: Imam Khomeini Naval University of Noshahr
- Designed: 2012-2019
- Manufacturer: Iran
- Produced: 2019-present
- Variants: Jask-3

Specifications
- Length: >10 ft (3.0 m)
- Operational range: 19 nmi (35 km)
- Launch platform: Ghadir-class submarine, Fateh-class submarine

The Jask-2 missile is an Iranian submarine-launched cruise missile developed from the Iranian Nasr-1 Anti-ship missile. It is designed to be fired from the Ghadir-class midget submarines and it can also be launched by the Fateh-class submarines.

== History ==
According to some sources the missile was first displayed as a model in an exhibition by students of the Imam Khomeini Naval University of Noshahr in September 2012. In May 2017, the Iranians reportedly tested the Jask-2 cruise missile for the first time, however the tests failed. On 25 February 2019, the Iranians successfully tested the missile as part of the Velayat 97 maneuvers and released a footage of the missile being fired from a Ghadir-class submarine, Iran also modified the Fateh-class submarines so that they can also launch cruise missiles. By 11 September 2020, a Navy official claimed the Jask-2 cruise missiles had been mass produced (with such efforts starting in November 2019). Hossein Khanzadi also said that Iran wishes to extend the range of the Jask-2 missile and work is being done on the Jask-3 missile.

== Characteristics ==
submarine launch of Ghadir.

The missile is speculated to be encapsulated in a torpedo. with its own marine propulsion which allows it to swim out of a submarine's torpedo tube in a way conventional missiles can not, the missile's light weight, size and negative buoyancy allows it to do so making the missile somewhat unique as compared to other submarine launched cruise missiles. The missile separates from the torpedo once the missile leaves the sea. The missile has a range of just 19 nmi (35 km) and a length of >10 ft (3.0 m).

== See also ==
=== Other Iranian anti-ship missiles ===
- Hormuz
- Khalij Fars
- Qader
- Nasr-e Basir
- Ghadir

=== Other SLCMs ===
- UGM-84 Harpoon
- Babur
- P-700 Granit
- 3M-54 Kalibr
