= Delvar-class vessel =

Iranian auxiliary ships

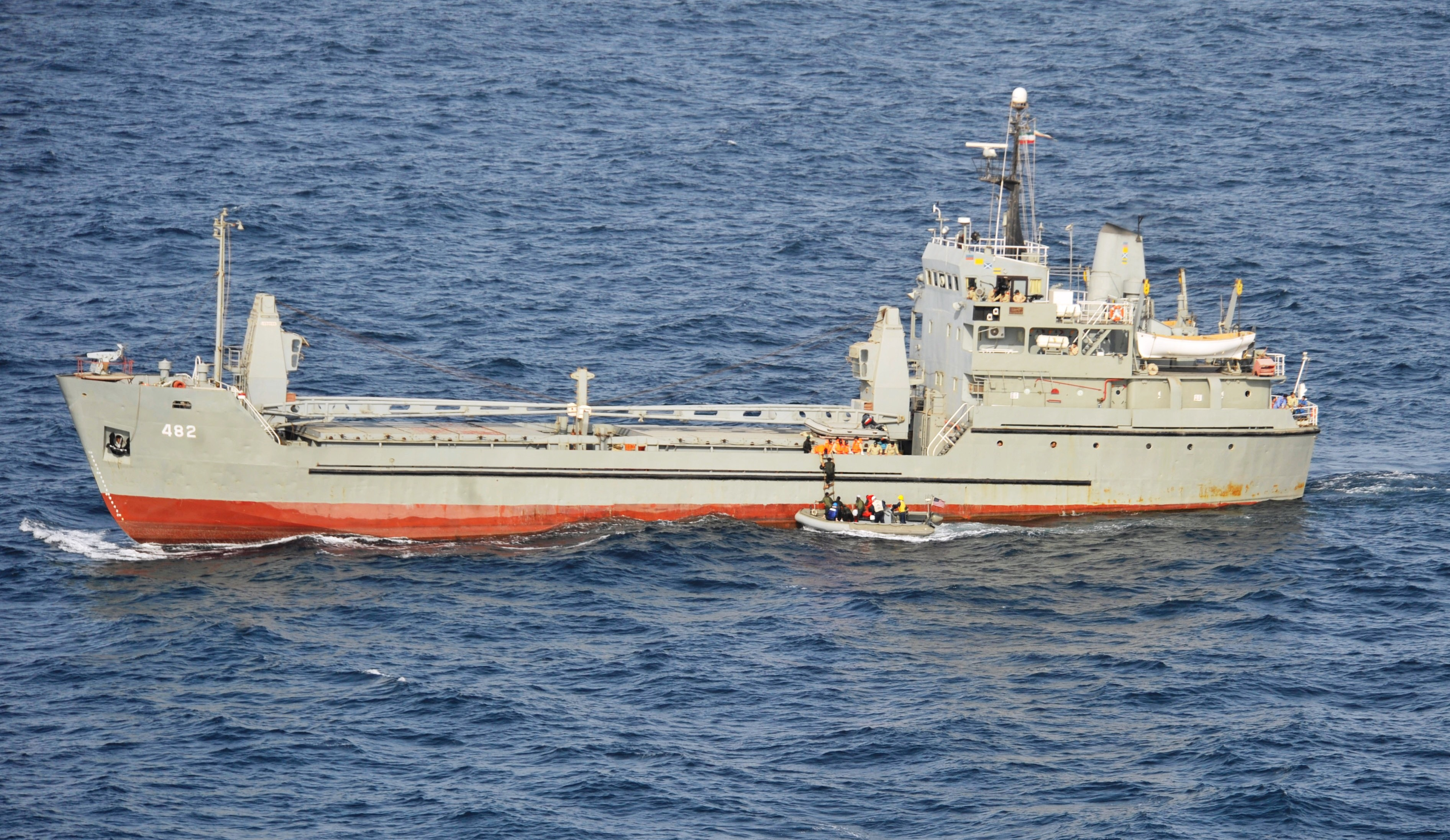

Class overview
- Builders: Karachi Shipyard & Engineering Works, Pakistan
- Operators: Islamic Republic of Iran Navy
- Built: 1980–1982
- Completed: 7
- Active: 7

General characteristics
- Type: Auxiliary ship
- Tonnage: 904 GT; 777 DWT
- Length: 64 m (210 ft 0 in)
- Beam: 10.5 m (34 ft 5 in)
- Draught: 3.3 m (10 ft 10 in)
- Installed power: Diesel
- Propulsion: 2 × MAN G6V 23.5/33ATL, 1,560 horsepower (1.16 MW); 2 × shafts
- Speed: 11 knots (20 km/h)
- Complement: 20

The Delvar class (Persian: دلوار) is a series of auxiliary ships built by the Karachi Shipyard & Engineering Works for the Islamic Republic of Iran Navy.

== Design ==
=== Dimensions and machinery ===
The ships have gross tonnage of 904 tonnes and their deadweight tonnage is 777 t (765 long tons). The class design is 64 m (210 ft 0 in) long, would have a beam of 10.5 m (34 ft 5 in) and a draft of 3.3 m (10 ft 10 in). It uses two shafts, powered by two MAN G6V 23.5/33ATL diesel engines. This system was designed to provide 1,560 horsepower (1.16 MW) for an estimated top speed of 11 knots (20 km/h; 13 mph).

=== Sensors and processing systems ===
For navigation, Delvar-class vessels rely on Decca 1226 on IJ-band.

=== Armament ===
Delvar-class vessels are reportedly equipped with one 20 mm GAM-BO1 cannon and two 12.7 mm machine guns. The ships have been rearmed.

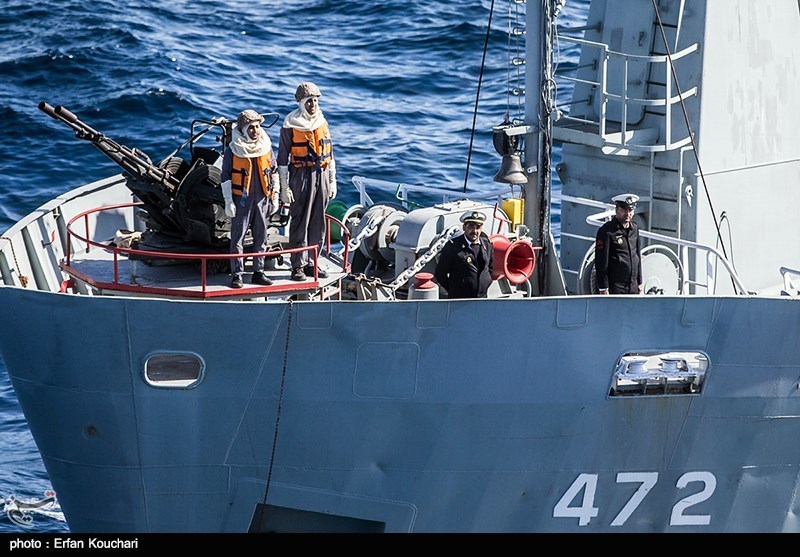
The gun installed on the forecastle

== Ships in the class ==
Known ships in commission the class are:

Ship	Namesake	Pennant number	Type	Status
Deylam	Bandar Deylam	424	AWI	In service
Delvar	Delvar	471	AEL	In service
Sirjan	Sirjan	472	AEL	In service
Charak	Bandar Charak	481	AKL	In service
Chiroo	Bandar-e Chiruiyeh	482	AKL	In service
Souru	Souru	483	AKL	In service
Dayer	Bandar-e Deyr	Unknown	AWI	In service
