= Fateh-class submarine =

Iranian class of semi-heavy submarines

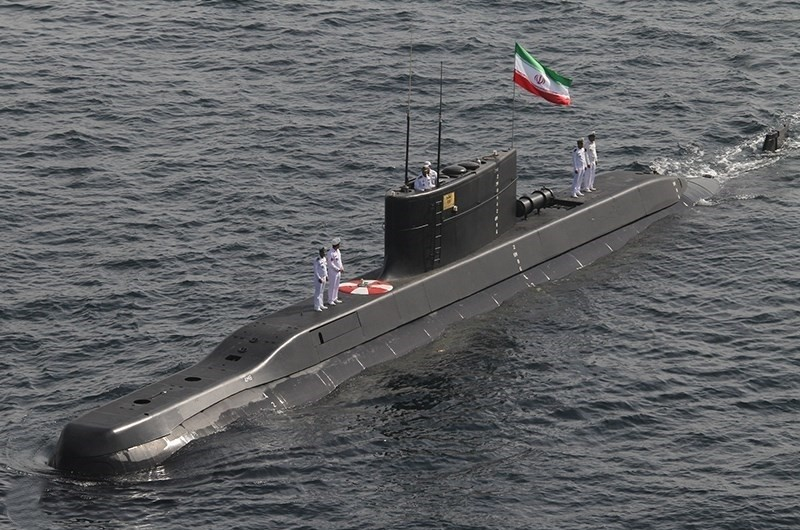
- Fateh (IRIS 920)

Class overview
- Name: Fateh
- Builders: Marine Industries Organization
- Operators: Islamic Republic of Iran Navy
- Built: 2008–present
- In service: 2019–present
- Planned: 4
- Building: 3
- Completed: 1
- Lost: 1

General characteristics
- Type: Semi-heavy submarine
- Displacement: 527 tons (surfaced); 593 tons (submerged)
- Length: 48 m (157 ft)
- Propulsion: BLDC (Diesel-electric)
- Speed: 11 knots (20 km/h), surfaced; 14 knots (26 km/h), submerged
- Range: 3,600 nmi (6,700 km) at 8 knots (15 km/h), snorkeling
- Endurance: 35 days
- Test depth: 250 m (820 ft)
- Sensors & processing systems: 11 retractable sensors, including an electro-optical mast and what appeared to be an optical periscope. Others may include a radar and electronic intelligence sensors for target-acquisition purposes.
- Electronic warfare & decoys: Yes
- Armament: 6 torpedoes/cruise missiles (4 × 533 mm (21 in) torpedo tubes), 8 naval mines

Fateh (Persian: فاتح, meaning "conqueror") is an Iranian designed class of semi-heavy submarines. The Iranian media reported that Fateh class subs can operate more than 200 meters (660 ft) below the sea surface for nearly five weeks.

== History ==
In September 2013, the Iranian Navy announced that the first sub of this class would be launched by the end of the current Iranian year (in March 2014). According to satellite imagery the first sub of the class was launched in 2013 and a second one was under construction at the Bandar Anzali Naval Base on the Caspian Sea.

In 2019 the Islamic Republic News Agency reported that the Fateh had joined Iran's fleet after final tests, in a ceremony attended by Iranian president Hassan Rouhani. It reported that the Fateh is "equipped with sonar, electric drive, combined battle management, surface-to-surface guided missile guidance, torpedo guidance, electronic and telecommunication warfare, secure and integrated telecommunication systems and dozens of state-of-the-art modern systems. Fateh submarine has surface speed of 11 knots (20.35 km/h) and is capable of travelling submerged at 14 knots (25.9 km/h). The submarine is armed with four 533-mm torpedoes; it can carry eight sea mines and two reserve torpedoes."

On January 13, 2021, Fateh demonstrated its capability to fire torpedoes during the Eqtedar naval exercise.

According to Irans's naval commander, the hulls of the 2nd, 3rd and 4th submarines of the class have been constructed and are being equipped.

Iran claims that Fateh detected the American nuclear-powered submarine USS Florida cruising stealthily in the Strait of Hormuz on April 20, 2023 and forced it to surface and correct its course. However, the United States Fifth Fleet denied the claims.

On March 3, 2026, CENTCOM released a video on X announcing the Fateh had been sunk during Operation Epic Fury.

== Submarines in the class ==
Submarine	Launched	Commissioned	Status
IRIS Fateh (920)	2013 or 2016	17 February 2019	Sunk
Fateh 2 (921)	Unknown	TBA	Undergoing trials
Fateh 3 (922)	Unknown	TBA	Under construction
Fateh 4 (923)	Unknown	TBA	Under construction

== See also ==
- List of submarine classes in service
- List of naval ship classes of Iran
- List of military equipment manufactured in Iran
