= Ra'ad (anti-ship missile) =

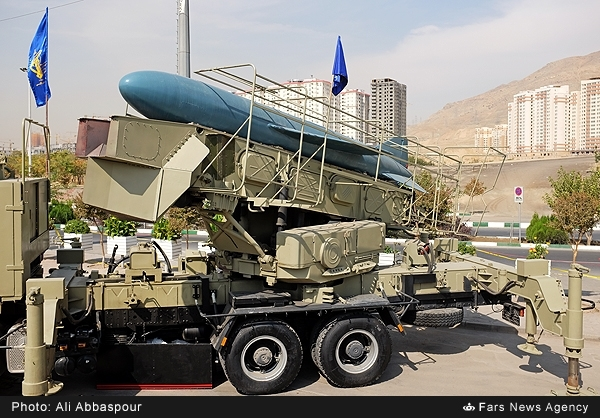
- Type: Anti-ship cruise missile
- Place of origin: Iran

Service history
- In service: 2007–present
- Used by: Iran

Production history
- Manufacturer: Iran Aviation Industries Organization

Specifications
- Mass: 3000 kg
- Length: 7.36 metres
- Diameter: 0.76 metres
- Warhead weight: 512 kg
- Engine: Solid-propellant booster
- Propellant: Turbo-jet engine
- Operational range: 360 km
- Flight altitude: Sea-skimming 30 - 50 meters
- Maximum speed: Mach 0.8 - 1.0
- Launch platform: Mobile Ground and Sea Launch-able

Ra'ad (Persian: رعد, lit. 'thunder') is an Iranian designed and built subsonic anti-ship cruise missile. The missile is a reverse engineered and upgraded variant of China's Silkworm anti-ship missile. The missile was developed by the state-run Iran Aviation Industries Organization (IAIO). Iran reportedly began full production of the Ra’ad in January 2004 and it went into service in 2007. The missile is equipped for ground and ship-launched platforms.

== Development ==
During the Iran-Iraq War, China supplied Iran with numerous types of missile which included two variants of the Silkworm anti-ship missile, the HY-2 and HY-4. Prior to the post-war period, Iran's military was heavily dependent on foreign weaponry supplied mainly by the United Kingdom and the United States. In order to achieve independence and reduce foreign expenditure in the arms sphere, Iran engaged in a campaign of reverse engineering and producing any weaponry it possessed. The Ra'ad was one of the weapons which Iran reverse engineered.

The Silkworm variant which the Ra'ad is based on exactly is unknown and disputed. However, some sources state that it is based on the HY-2 and others stating that it is based on the HY-4.

It is unknown when the development stage began but it is known that the full production of the missile began in January 2004.

The Ra’ad was successfully test fired on 7 February 2007. This was confirmed by then Deputy Air Force Commander Ali Fadavi who said: "We have successfully test fired a cruise missile called SSN4, or Raad, hitting targets 300 kilometres away in the Sea of Oman and northern Indian Ocean".

== Features ==
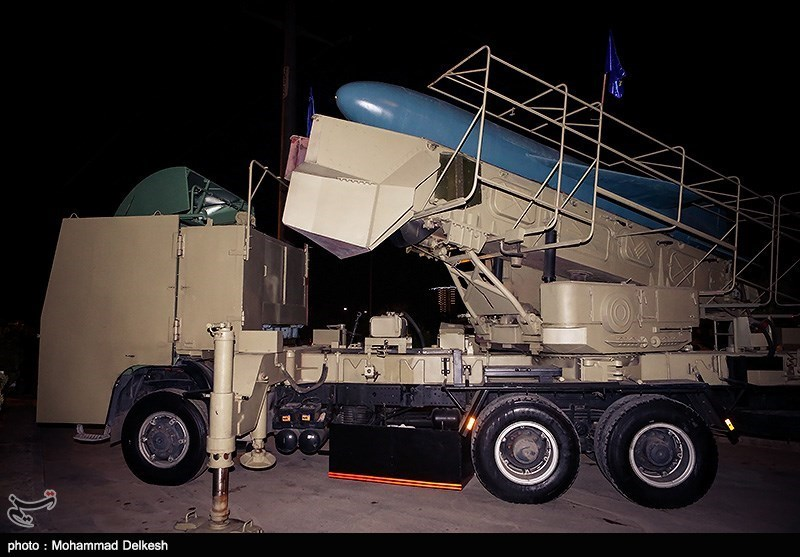
"Saegheh" variant

The Ra'ad is an anti-ship cruise missile that is capable of being launched from both surface and sea platforms. The engine of the Ra'ad utilizes a solid-propellant booster with a turbojet engine and employs an inertial navigation system and terminal guidance, the exact type of terminal guidance is unknown but IHS Jane's Weapons states that it is "likely infared imaging or an active radar system." The missile also has sea-skimming capabilities, with the ability to fly at low-altitudes to evade radar detection and missile defences.

== Operators ==
- Iran- The missile was tested in a naval exercise in April 2010, flying 300 km. The Ra'ad is currently in active service and is primarily deployed along the Persian Gulf and on various naval vessels.

== See also ==
- Noor
