= Islamic Republic of Iran Navy =

Maritime branch of Iran Armed Forces

Coordinates: 27.1427°N 56.2154°E

- نیروی دریایی ارتش جمهوری اسلامی ایران
- The seal of the Islamic Republic of Iran Navy
- Founded: 1885; 141 years ago (first modern-day naval forces); 1923; 103 years ago (as Imperial Iranian Navy)
- Country: Iran
- Type: Navy
- Role: Naval warfare
- Size: 18,000 (IISS 2026)
- Part of: Islamic Republic of Iran Army
- Garrison/HQ: Bandar Abbas
- Nicknames: Persian: دریادلان, Dəryâdēlân "Seahearts"
- Anniversaries: 28 November
- Fleet: Unclear as of March 2026
- Engagements: World War II; Anglo-Soviet invasion of Iran; Joint Operation Arvand; Seizure of Abu Musa and Tunbs; Second Iraqi–Kurdish War; 1974–1975 Shatt al-Arab conflict; Iran–Iraq War; Tanker war; Twelve-Day War; 2026 Iran war

Commanders
- Commander: Commodore Shahram Irani

Insignia
- Ensign

- Flag

- Jack

- Roundel

The Islamic Republic of Iran Navy, (Note: (IRIN; Persian: نیروی دریایی ارتش جمهوری اسلامی ایران, romanized: Nirū-yē Dəryâyi-yē Ərtēš-ē Žomhūri-yē Ēslâmi-yē Irân, abbreviated NEDAJA; Persian: نداجا)) also referred to as Iranian Navy, is the naval warfare branch of the Islamic Republic of Iran Army. It is one of the two naval forces of the Iranian Armed Forces, the other is the Islamic Revolutionary Guard Corps Navy.

NEDAJA is charged with forming Iran's first line of defense in the Gulf of Oman, Persian Gulf and abroad. It is generally considered to be a conventional green-water navy, as it mostly operates regionally, namely in the Red Sea, Mediterranean Sea, and northwest quarter of the Indian Ocean. The Navy aims to develop blue-water capabilities: in July 2016, it announced plans to establish a presence in the Atlantic Ocean, and as of May 2021 had sent ships into the region.

NEDAJA shares many functions and responsibilities with the IRGC Navy, with distinctions in military strategy and equipment: In contrast to the IRGC Navy, which is equipped with small fast-attack craft, the backbone of the Artesh naval inventory consists of larger surface ships, including frigates and corvettes, and submarines.

The Artesh Navy had a large fleet prior to 2026, and was ranked highly among the world's top fleets, and was described in 2012 as maintaining "robust" capabilities by regional standards. As of 2019, the Navy had several joint exercises with Russia and China called the Marine Security Belt, which it aims to conduct annually.

== History and overview ==
An Iranian navy in one form or another has existed since Achaemenid times and the First Persian Empire around 500 BC. The Islamic Republic of Iran Navy came into being when the former Imperial Iranian Navy (IIN) of the Pahlavi Era was renamed following the Iranian Revolution in 1979.

=== 1939–1979 ===
The Iranian navy was rebuilt after being almost completely destroyed during the Anglo-Soviet invasion of Iran in World War II. Following World War II, the fleet began replacing destroyed warships with destroyers, frigates and many smaller vessels, including powerboats and hovercraft, many of which originated from the US and UK, which had played a part in destroying much of the original equipment in World War II.

Mohammad Reza Pahlavi, the last Shah of Iran, ordered four modern general purpose destroyers from the United States and eight modified Kortenaer-class frigates from Royal Schelde, but both contracts were canceled after the 1979 Iranian revolution. The destroyers were instead commissioned in the U.S. Navy as the Kidd class, while construction of the frigates had not yet started.

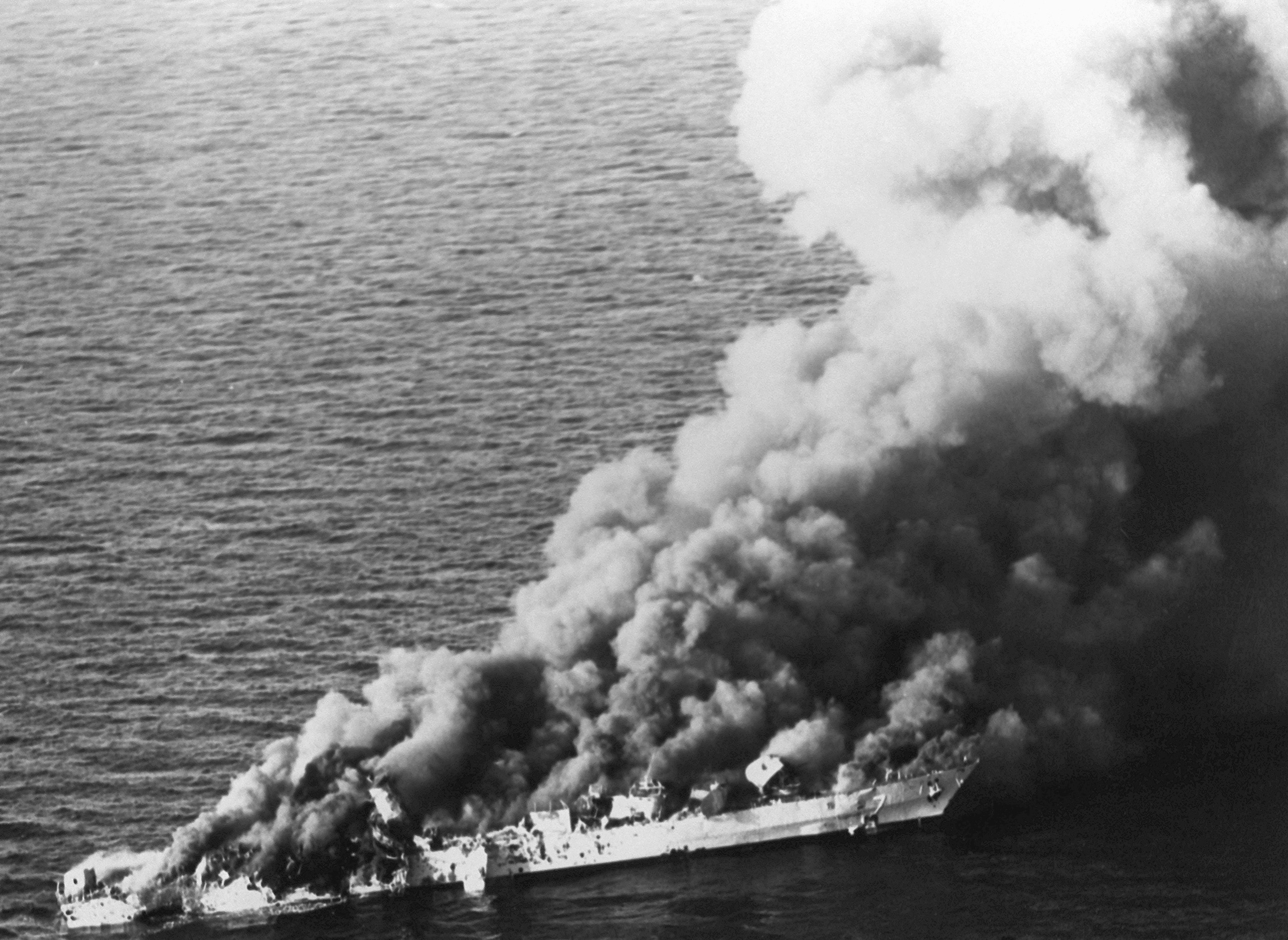
Frigate IRIS Sahand on flames after being attacked by the US Navy during the Tanker War, 1988

Following this was the US-led arms embargo on Iran and the Iran–Iraq War. The arms embargo restricted Iran's ability to maintain and equip its navy. It had to find new sources of armaments. Equipment and weaponry were imported from the Soviet Union, China, North Korea and later, Russia. Iran acquired three Kilo-class submarines from Russia, as well as 10 Houdong fast attack craft from China. Russia and India were reportedly assisting Iran with training and operating its Kilo-class submarines. Iran acquired additional mine warfare capability, and upgraded some of its older surface ships.

In December 1997, Rear Admiral Mohammad Karim Tavakoli, commander of the First Naval Zone, with his headquarters at Bandar Abbas, claimed that the Iranian Navy had completed design work on three multirole corvettes and a small submarine, to be built in Iran.

=== 2000–2020 ===
In terms of major surface ships, Iran relied on its Alvand-class frigates, and the new Moudge-class frigates, which were indigenously developed in Iran and are reverse-engineered Alvand class with modern electronics, radar and armament. As of 2012, its largest ships were four frigates and three corvettes. These ships are supported by three Russian-built SSK Kilo-class attack submarines and Ghadir and Nahang-class mini submarines.

In December 2014, Iran conducted joint wargames involving the Iranian Army, Air Force and Navy. The naval phase took part in a wide area, ranging from the Persian Gulf to the northern Indian Ocean and to the Gulf of Aden. New systems were tested, including new anti-ship cruise missiles, an electro-magnetic and acoustic naval mine-sweeping system and the "Fateh" submarine.

In July 2016, the Navy said that it would establish a presence in the Atlantic Ocean, of unspecified duration.

In August 2019, Iran's navy deployed two warships, the destroyer Sahand and the supply ship/replenishment oiler Kharg, to the Gulf of Aden to protect commercial shipping. In September 2019, the head of the Iran navy said it was ready to defend its marine borders, and denied US and Saudi claims that Iran had orchestrated recent attacks on Saudi oil sites.

In November 2019, the Islamic Republic News Agency reported that Iran's navy had sent a fleet of 64 ships to the Gulf of Aden to "safeguard Iran's interests" in an "insecure seafaring region." The month prior, a maritime coalition led by the United States had launched operations in the Gulf of Aden. The Iran and US navies subsequently encountered each other in the Strait of Hormuz on 23 November 2019, with no conflict.

On 4 December 2019, the Iranian Navy's head Rear Admiral Hossein Khanzadi stated that the 'Marine Security Belt' exercises with China and Russia would begin on 27 December in the northern Indian Ocean. On 30 December 2019, Rear Admiral Khanzadi acknowledged during a televised interview with the semi-official Mehr News Agency that the Iranian Navy conducted joint exercises with Russia and China and will continue to do so on an annual basis. Khanzadi stated that the drills were now needed due to a lack of coordination. He also stated that invitations which invited other countries to participate in the drills were unsuccessful.

In December 2019, Khanzadi said that efforts by other countries to form alliances against Iran in the Persian Gulf were "pointless".

=== 2020-present ===
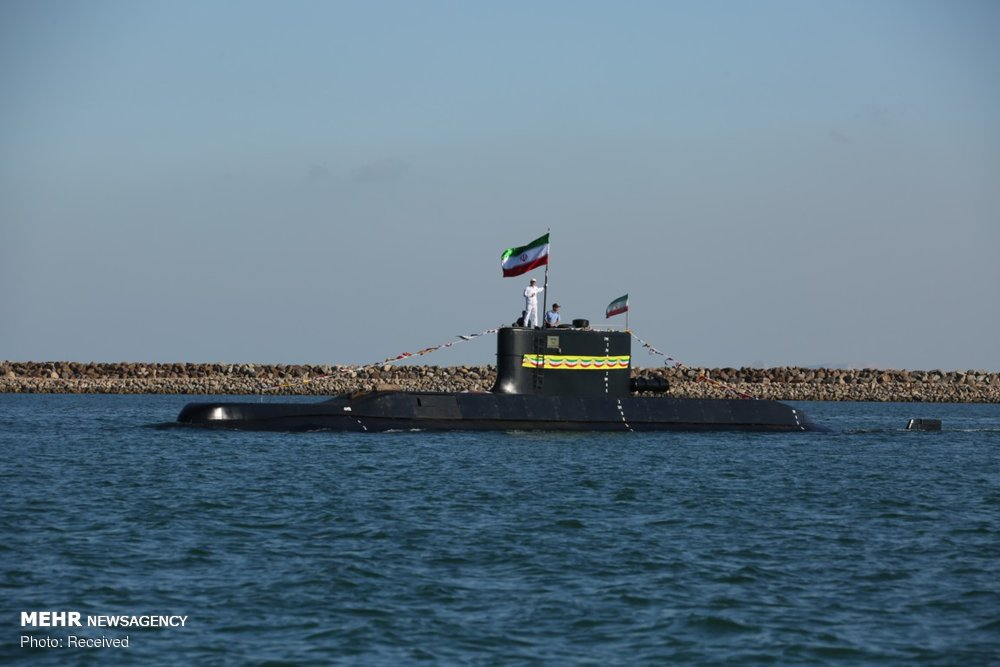
IRIS Fateh in her commissioning ceremony

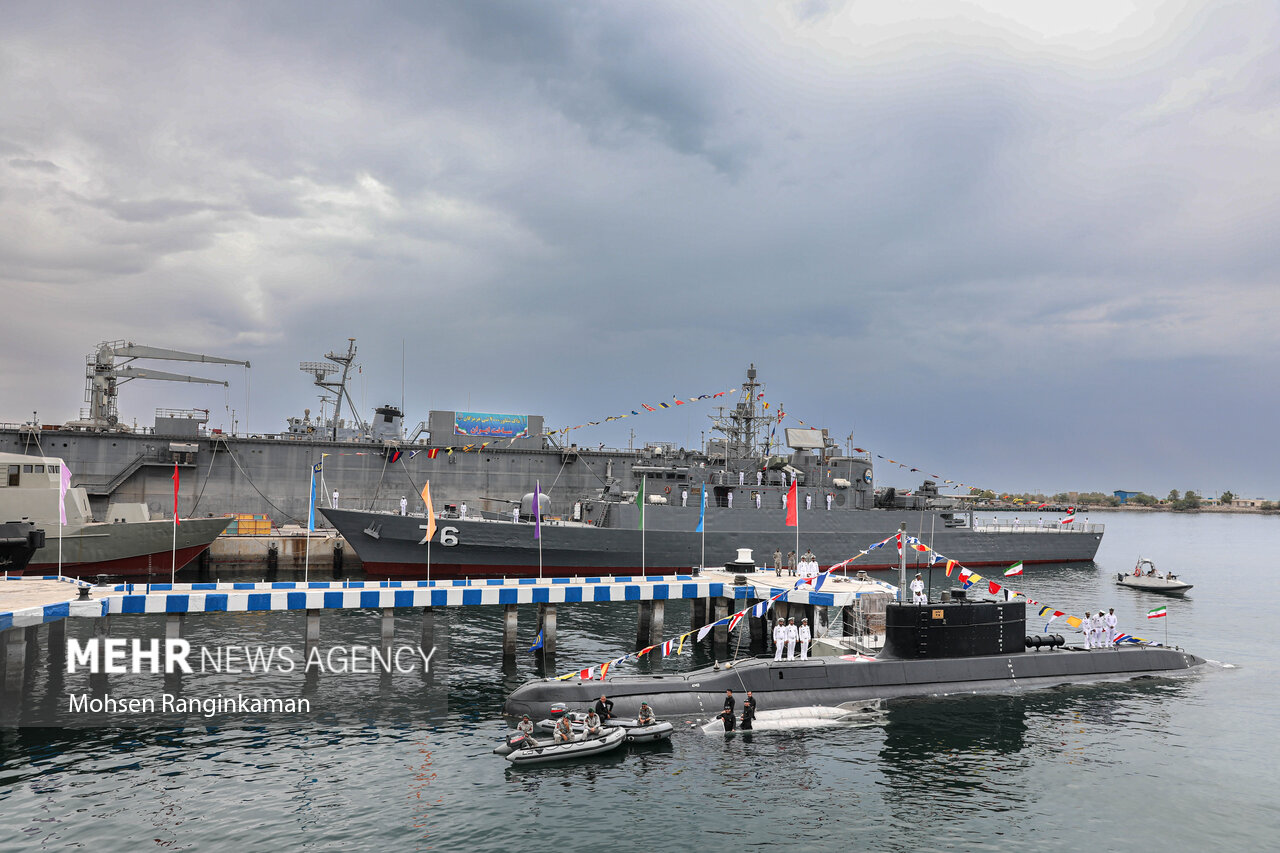
IRIS Jamaran and IRIS Fateh during the official welcome of the 86th naval group

In September 2022, for the first time, the Navy captured two U.S. Navy sea drones in the Red Sea. They were soon returned to U.S. control.

Iran developed an unknown number of uncrewed surface vessels (USVs) in the early 2020s. The first confirmed attack by an Iranian USV took place during the 2026 Iran conflict.

In February 2023, Brazil gave permission for IRIS Makran and IRIS Dena to dock at Rio de Janeiro. In April 2023, the Iran Navy seized a Marshall Islands–flagged Suezmax tanker, the Advantage Sweet, laden with oil from Kuwait and bound for Houston, off Muscat. The US Navy said it was "at least the fifth commercial vessel [seized] by Tehran in the last two years". It appeared that the vessel managers were Turkish and the owner was Chinese. This seizure was in response to the U.S. seizing the Iran-origin cargo on the Suez Rajan off southeast Malaysia earlier in the month.

=== 2026 Iran war ===
In February 2026, the United States and Israel began to launch strikes on Iran. From early March 2026, the Navy began to suffer significant losses. Shortly after the beginning of the 2026 Iran war, on 1 March 2026, US President Donald Trump said nine IRIN vessels had been sunk. Iran has yet to confirm these numbers. On 3 March 2026, United States Central Command (CENTCOM) reported that it had eliminated eleven Iranian naval vessels in the Gulf of Oman. CENTCOM provided video footage of the elimination of one vessel.

On 4 March 2026, Pete Hegseth, the US Secretary of Defense, announced that a US submarine had sunk the IRIS Dena 75 kilometres (47 mi) off the coast of Sri Lanka, between 6am and 7am local time (0:30 to 1:30 GMT), with a Mark 48 torpedo; periscope footage was released later. The ship was believed to have 180 personnel on board, and was underway after participating in the Indian International Fleet Review 2026 and MILAN exercises. Sri Lankan authorities reported recovering 87 bodies and 32 critically injured.

The operational status of the remainder of Iran's naval vessels remains unclear.

Other Iranian vessels, including the submarine IRIS Fateh, were reportedly destroyed or badly damaged in strikes linked to operations by the Israel Defense Forces and US forces. Because of these losses, analysts say parts of Iran's navy are becoming increasingly weakened and less effective in combat.

== Ships ==
This listing is a composite of 'The Military Balance 2026' of the International Institute of Strategic Studies (IISS) with provisional and unverified removals of ships / submarines sunk during the 2026 Iran War.

Between the 2020 and 2026 editions of the Military Balance, the Shahid Soleimani double-hull vessels were moved to the IRGC listing.

Type	In service	Class	Notes
Sub-surface warfare units (18 - 13 sunk, 2026 war)
Attack submarine	0	Kilo class	Two more non-operational.
Coastal submarine	0	Fateh class	Total of four planned; IISS 2026 lists 1. Lead ship IRIS Fateh sunk during 2026 war.
Midget submarine	5+	Ghadir class	Additional vessels in build. 11 destroyed by US military actions
Patrol and Coastal Combatants (70)
Corvette (+AShM/SAM)	0	Bayandor class	Two ships sunk in 2026 war. IISS 2026: 1 + 1 non-operational.
Corvette	0	Hamzeh class	Converted from Shahsavar, a yacht formerly belonging to Mohammad Reza Pahlavi
Frigate (+AShM)	0	Alvand class	4th ship sunk in 1988. Alvand and Sabalan sunk during 2026 war; Alborz destroyed in dry dock during war.
Frigate (+AShM)	0	Moudge class	UK Vosper Mk 5 mod. Four ships sunk during 2026 war. Jane's Fighting Ships considers this class guided-missile frigates (FFGs).
Patrol Craft Fast I (+AShM/SAM)	10	Kaman class	French La Combattante II type fast attack craft. "Up to 10" listed by IISS 2026 before the beginning of the 2026 war.
Patrol Craft Fast I (+AShM/SAM)	1	Sina class	Jane's Fighting Ships considers this class of vessel fast attack craft (PGGF). Four were sunk in the 2026 Iran war.
Patrol boat (+AShM)	3	Hendijan class	
Patrol boat (+AShM)	3	Kaivan class	
Patrol boat (+AShM)	3	Parvin class	Jane's Fighting Ships considers this class of vessel PC or Patrol Craft Fast.
Patrol Boat Fast (+Torpedo)	3	Kajami class	
Patrol Boat Fast	1	MIL 55 class	
Patrol boat	9	C 14 class	
Patrol boat	8	Hendijan class	
Patrol boat	6	MkII class	
Patrol boat	10	MkIII class	

Type	In service	Class	Notes
Amphibious warfare units (23)
Landing Ship Medium	3	Farsi class	
Landing Ship Tank	3	Hengam class	
Landing Ship Logistics	6	Fouque class	
Landing Craft Tank	2		
Landing Craft Air Cushion	2	Wellington Mk 4	
Landing Craft Air Cushion	4	Wellington Mk 5	
Landing Craft Air Cushion	2	Tondar	
Landing Craft Utility	1	LIAN 110	
Logistics units (18)
Auxiliary Submarine	1	Nahang-class submarine	
Ammunition carrier	2	Delvar class	
Auxiliary floating drydock	2	Dolphin class	
Cargo ship	3	Delvar class	
Fleet replenishment oiler	2	Bandar Abbas class	IISS 2026 lists two vessels in service.
Water tanker	4	Kangan class	
Water tanker	1	Delvar class	
Training craft	2	Kialas	

In addition, there is the modified Jamaran (Moudge) class vessel, Zagros, an auxiliary intelligence-gathering ship (AGI). IISS 2026 also continues to list the expeditionary sea base Makran. She was struck by missiles and set afire while moored at Chabahar Port.

=== Current aircraft ===
Aircraft	Origin	Type	Variant	In service	Notes
Fixed-wing aircraft
Dassault Falcon 20	France	transport		1	
Fokker F27	Netherlands	transport		4	
Helicopters
Bell 212	United States	transport	AB-212	8	
Mil Mi-17	Russia	transport		5	
Sikorsky SH-3	United States	anti-submarine	S-61/ASH-3D	8	
Sikorsky CH-53	United States	mine countermeasures	S-65/RH-53D	6	

== Structure ==
=== Persian Gulf and Arabian Sea ===
The Iranian Navy is divided into three naval districts in the Persian Gulf and in the Arabian Sea. The vast majority of surface ships and submarines operate in the Persian Gulf and the Arabian Sea.

In 1977, the bulk of the fleet was shifted from Khorramshahr to the new headquarters at Bandar-e Abbas. Bushehr was the other main base. Smaller facilities were located at Khorramshahr, Khark Island, and Bandar-e Imam Khomeini (formerly known as Bandar-e Shahpur).

The naval base at Bandar Beheshti (formerly known as Chah Bahar) on the Gulf of Oman had been under construction since the late 1970s and in late 1987 still was not completed. Smaller facilities were located near the Strait of Hormuz.

Smaller facilities include:

- Abu Musa – small docking facility on the island's west end; located near Abu Musa Airport
- Bandar Beheshti (Chah Bahar) – port and base facilities in the Gulf of Oman
- Bandar-e Khomeini – small sheltered base located near the border with Iraq
- Bandar-e Mahshahr – small base located near Bandar-e Khomeini
- Bushehr – repair and storage facility in the Persian Gulf; home to Navy Technical Supply Center and R&D center
- Jask – small base located across from Oman and UAE in southeastern Iran at the mouth of the Straits of Hormuz
- Kharg Island – base on the island and located northwest of Bushehr, home to hovercraft fleet
- Khorramshahr – former naval HQ; now repair and shipbuilding facilities
- Larak – small base on the island and near Bandar-e Abbas
- Qeshm – small port facility near Kharg and Bandar-e Abbas
- Sirri – island port facility located in the Persian Gulf and across from UAE

=== Caspian Sea ===
The Fourth Naval District in the Caspian Sea is headquartered at Bandar-e Anzali. It is the major training base and home of the force, which consisted of a few patrol boats and a minesweeper.

=== Marine, Missile, and Aviation forces ===
The Islamic Republic of Iran Navy Marine Command includes four marine infantry brigades.

The Navy's Missile Command operates the Kowsar, Nasr-1, Noor, Ghader, Ghadir, and Ra'ad missiles. The Missile Command also operates the Abu Mahdi missile, made public in 2020.

The Islamic Republic of Iran Navy Aviation includes about 85 helicopters and 13 fixed-wing aircraft.

Finally Noshahr is home to Iman Khomeini University for Naval Science, the naval staff college.

== Ranks ==
=== Commissioned officer ranks ===
The rank insignia of commissioned officers.

Rank group	General / flag officers					Senior officers			Junior officers
Iranian Navy
Iranian Navy	دریابد; Daryabod	دریاسالار; Daryasalar	دریابان; Daryaban	دریادار; Daryadar	دریادار دوم; Daryadar dovom	ناخدا یکم; Nakhoda yekom	ناخدا دوم; Nakhoda dovom	ناخدا سوم; Nakhoda sevom	ناوسروان; Navsarvan	ناوبان یکم; Navban yekom	ناوبان دوم; Navban dovom	ناوبان سوم; Navban sevom

=== Other ranks ===
The rank insignia of non-commissioned officers and enlisted personnel.

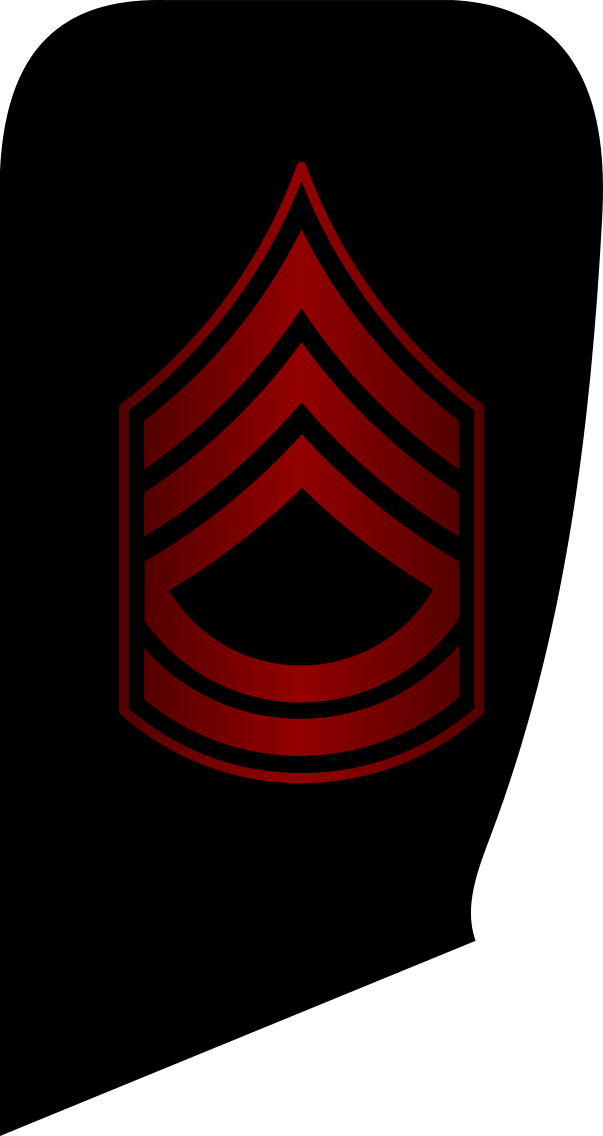
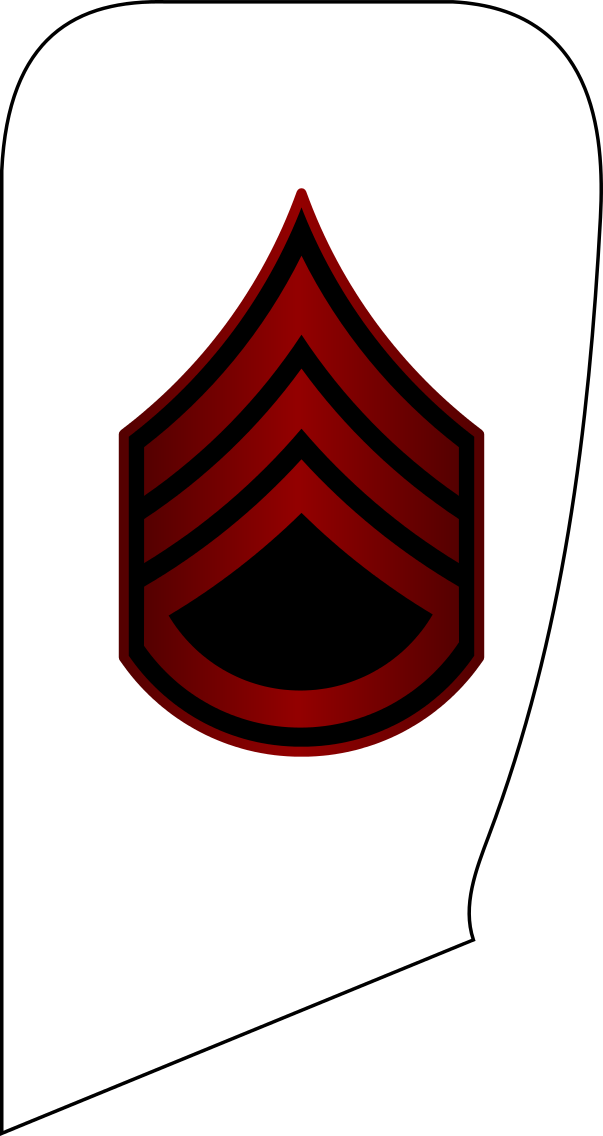
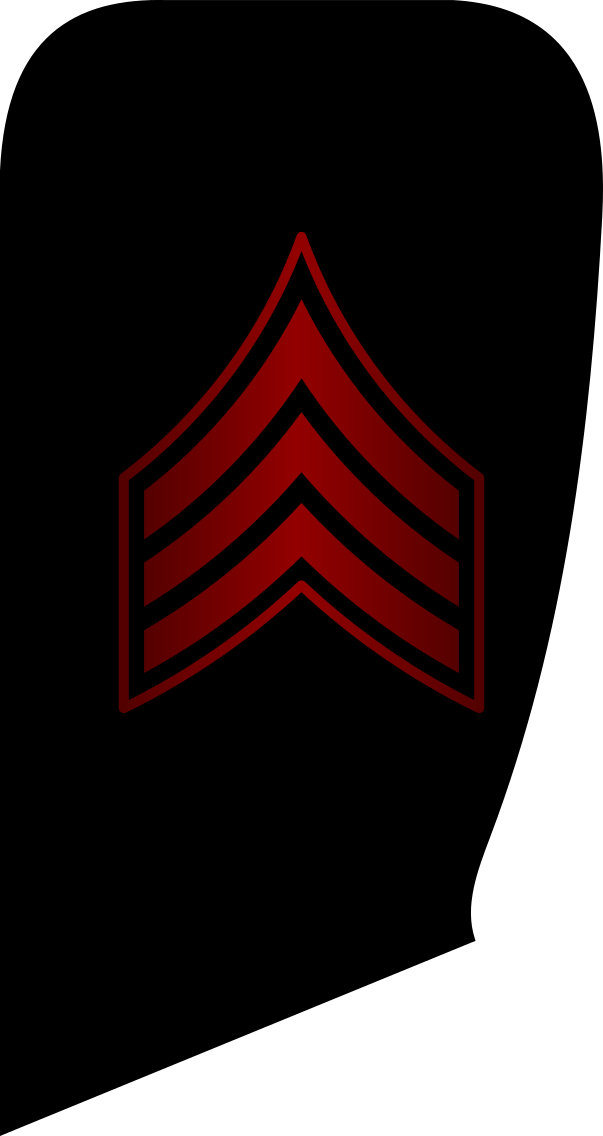
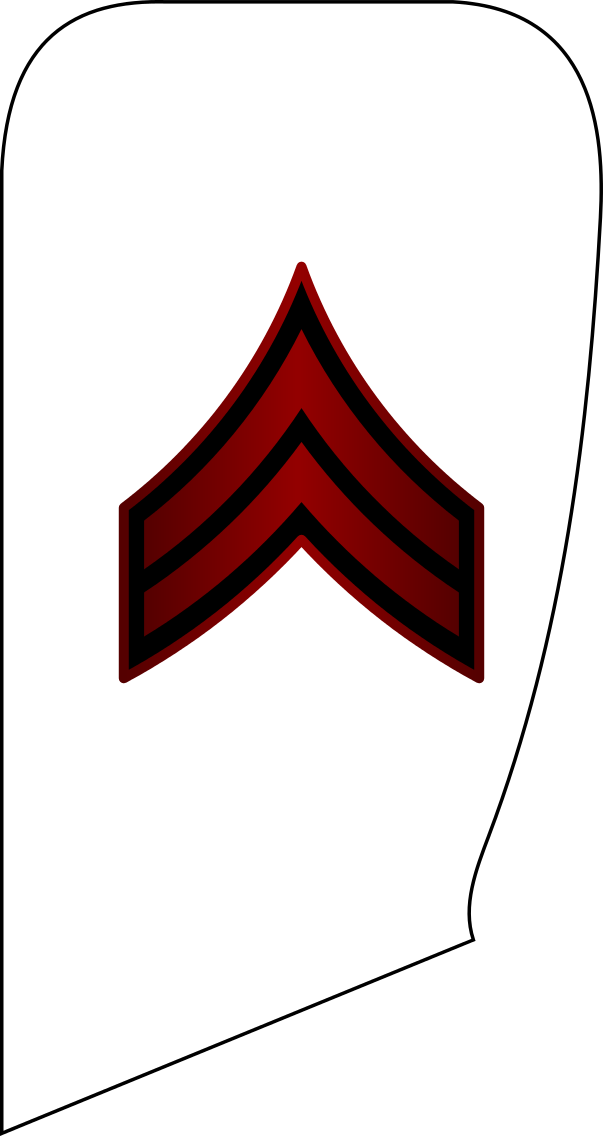
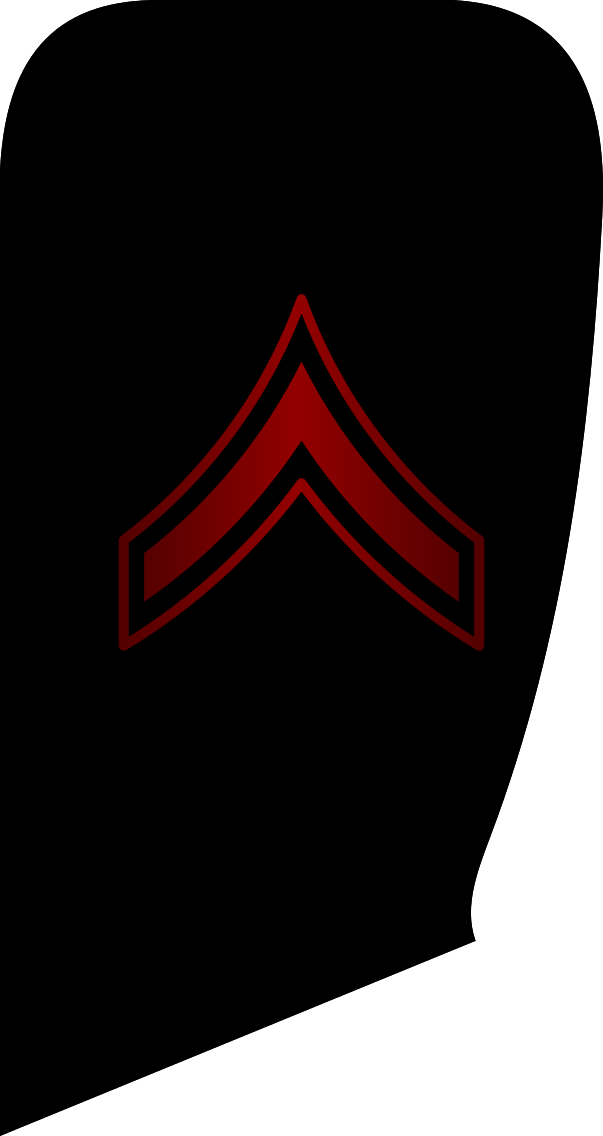
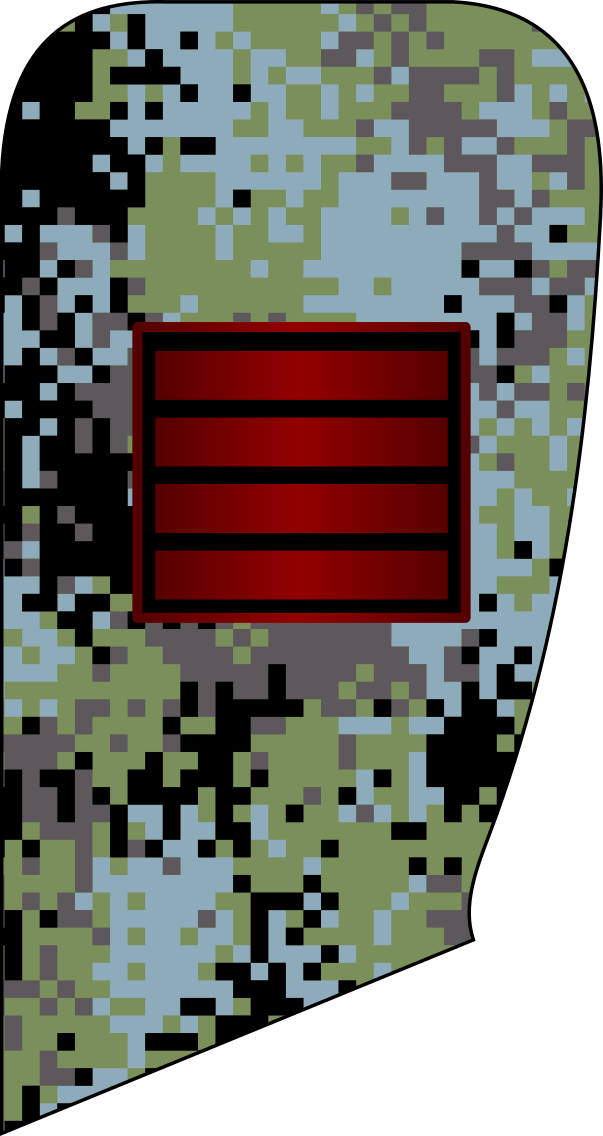
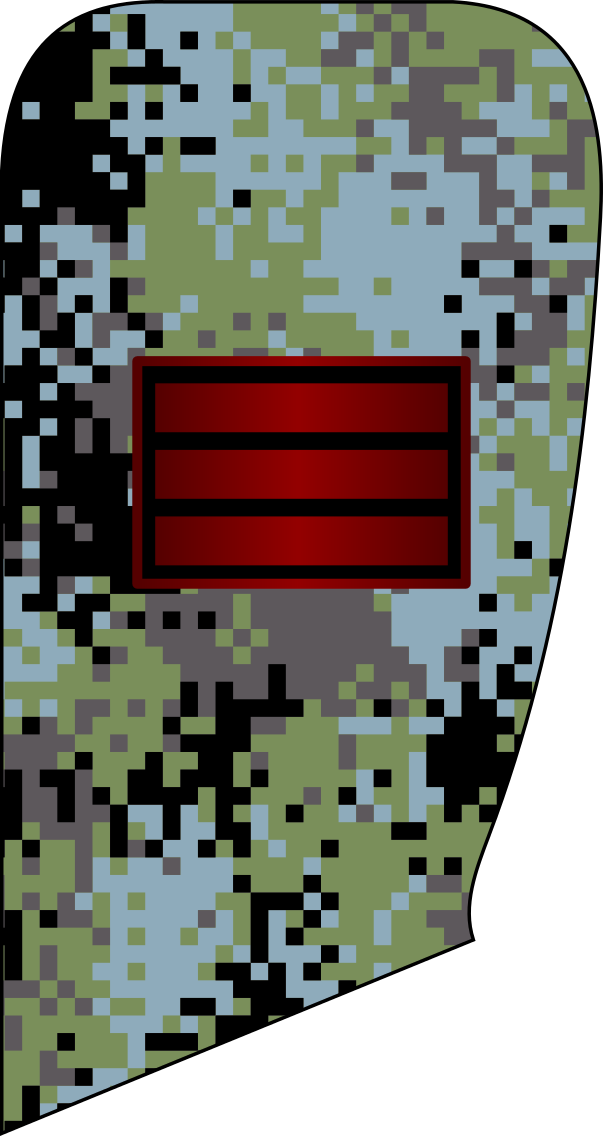
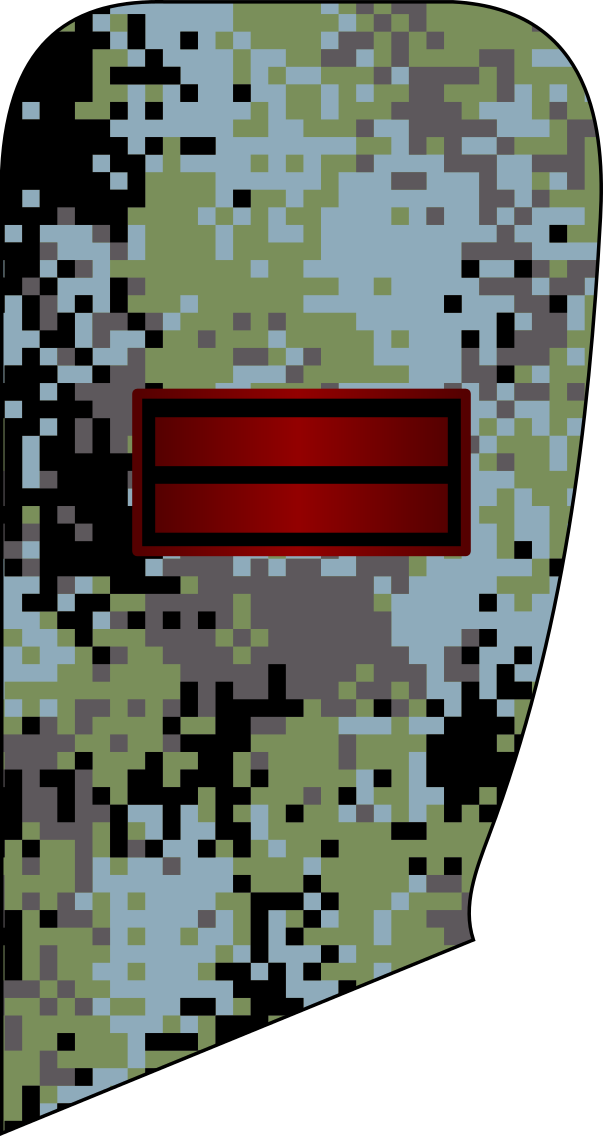
Rank group	Senior NCOs					Junior NCOs		Enlisted
Iranian Navy
Iranian Navy	ناواستوار یکم; Navostovar yekom	ناواستوار دوم; Navostovar dovom	مهناوی یکم; Mahnavi yekom	مهناوی دوم; Mahnavi dovom	مهناوی سوم; Mahnavi sevom	سرناوی; Sarnavi	ناوی یکم; Navi yekom	ناوی دوم; Navi dovom	ناوی; Navi

== New ships ==
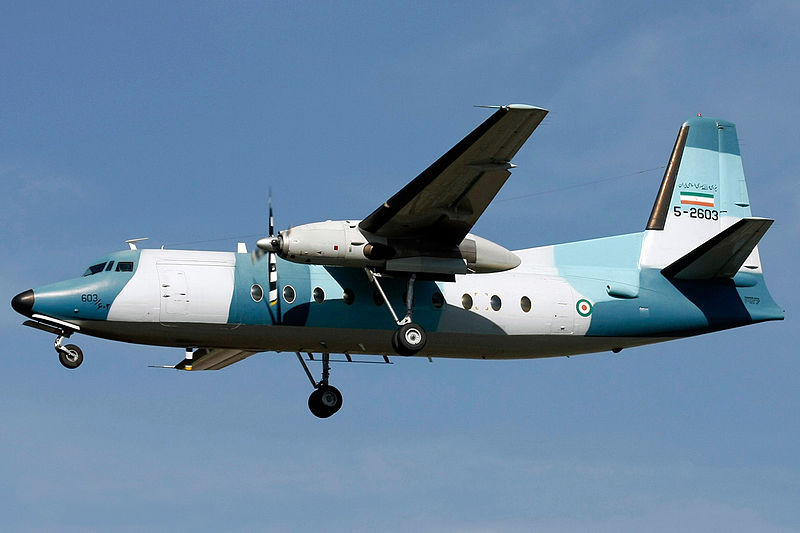
A Fokker F27 of the IRINA.

=== 2000–2010 ===
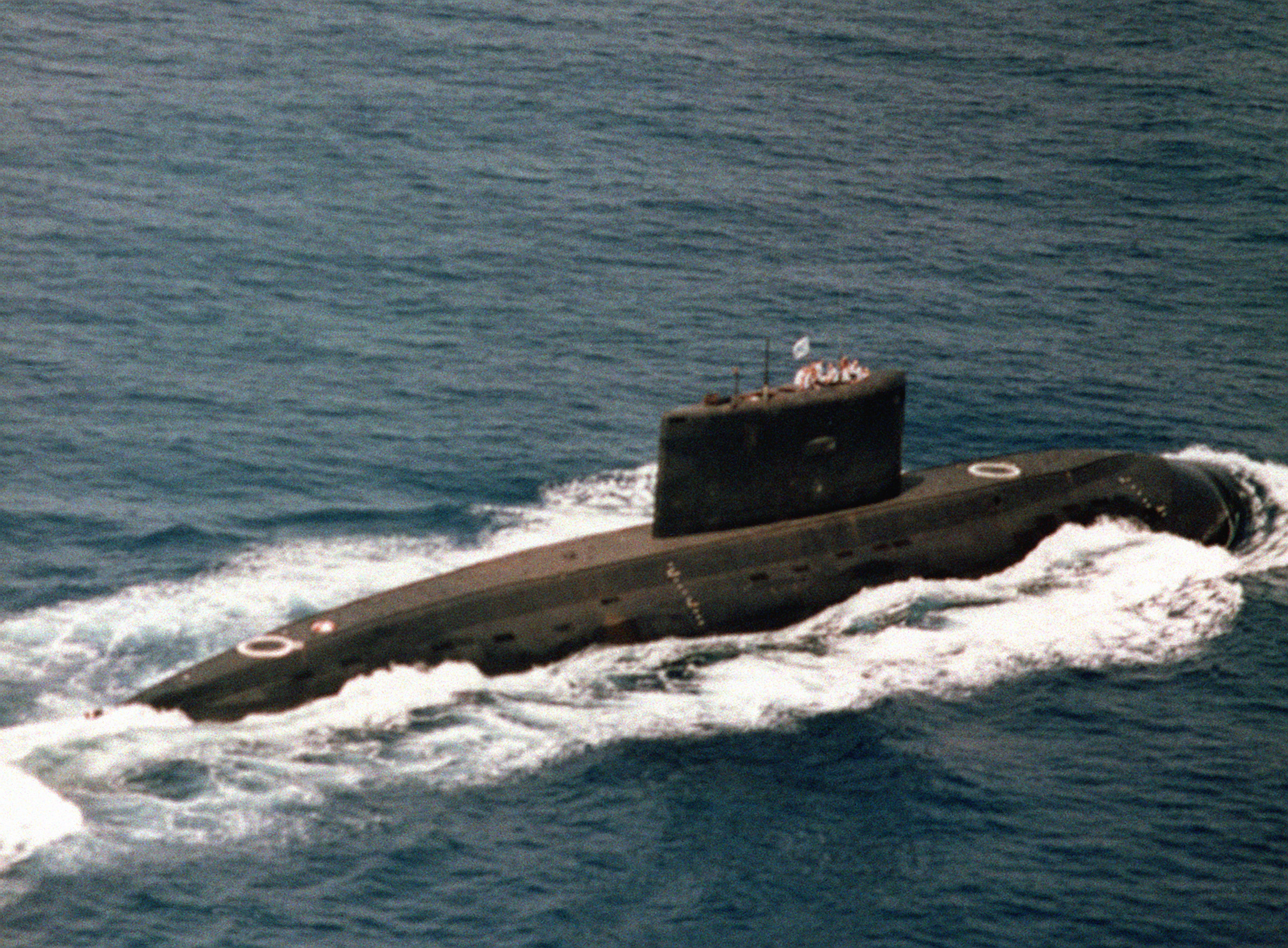
Iran has three Russian-built Kilo-class submarines patrolling the Persian Gulf. Iran is also producing its own submarines as of 2010.

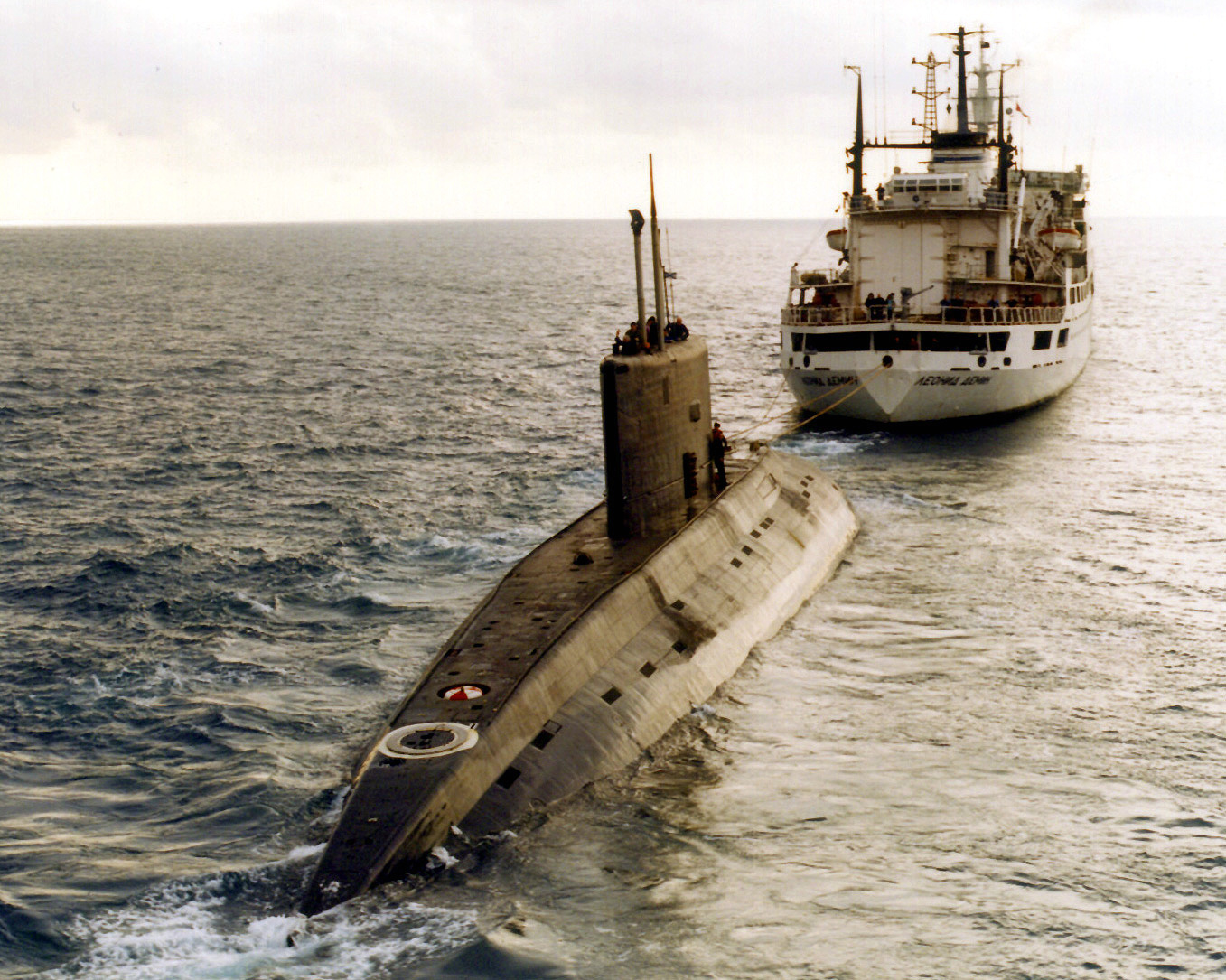
Kilo-class submarines of Iran

In August 2000, Iran announced that it had launched its first domestically produced light submarine or swimmer delivery vehicle, named the Al-Sabiha 15 because of its 15-meter (49 ft) length, in a ceremony at the Bandar Abbas naval base. In May 2005, the Iran navy announced that it had launched its first Ghadir-class midget submarine and in March 2006 announced that it had launched another submarine named Nahang (Persian: whale).

In 2000, the Islamic Republic of Iran Navy Aviation significantly improved its capability by taking delivery, from Russia, of a number of Mi-8 AMT (Mi-171) transport/attack helicopters. Under a contract signed in 1999, Russia agreed to supply 21 Mi-171s to Iran. Delivery was completed in 2001. The exact number destined for the navy was unknown. In summer 2001, there were indications that Iran would order a further 20 Mi-171s, although as of mid-2004, it was not known if this had occurred.

In November 2002, sources at Iran's Aerospace Industries Organisation (AIO) and the China Aerospace Science and Industry Corporation (COSIC) confirmed that the two groups were working on common anti-ship missile production and development. The effort, which Iranian sources call Project Noor, covers the short-range C-701 and the long-range C-802 weapons developed by COSIC's China National Precision Machinery Import and Export Co subsidiary. The possibility that a formal collaborative project was under way was first raised in 1998, when Iran displayed an Anti-Ship missile design similar to the 15-kilometer (9.3 mi) range C-701 shortly after the Chinese system was unveiled.

An AIO spokesperson confirmed that Project Noor involves the C-701. Officials in the same company describe the weapon as "a long-range, turbojet-powered, sea-skimming Anti-Ship missile," which better fits the 120 km (75 mi) range C-802, and suggests that the co-operation agreement may cover both weapon systems. In early 2004, Iran announced the release of a new cruise missile program named Raad (Thunder). The Raad appears to be a modification of the Chinese HY-2 (CSSC-3) anti-ship missile, one of a series of missiles China developed from the original Soviet-era P21 (SS-N-2C) design.

In September 2003, Iran's domestically produced Sina-class (reverse engineered from the Kaman class) missile boat Paykan, equipped with modern anti-ship missiles and modern electronics, entered service in the Islamic Republic of Iran Navy. The ship was launched in the Caspian Sea to protect Iran's interests there and was mentioned among the achievements of the Iranian Navy by Rear Admiral Habibollah Sayyari.

In September 2006, Iran commissioned their second self-made Sina-class missile boat, Joshan. Built in memory of the original Joshan, lost in the Persian Gulf during Operation Praying Mantis in April 1988. According to Iran's Navy commander Admiral Kouchaki, Joshan has a claimed speed of over 45-knot (83 km/h; 52 mph) and "enjoys the world's latest technology, especially with regard to its military, electrical and electronic systems, frame and chassis, and it has the capabilities required for launching powerful missiles."

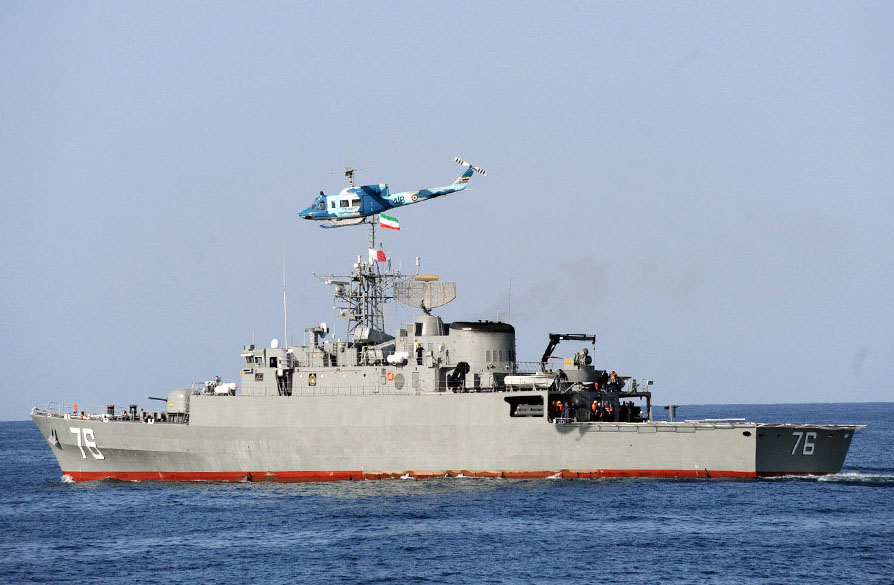
Domestically produced Iranian frigate Jamaran

In 2002, Iran announced it would start the production of its first domestically produced destroyer. By most international standards, the ship, the first of the Moudge class, would be considered a light frigate or a corvette. In November 2007, Iran's rear admiral Habibollah Sayyari announced that Iran would launch its first domestically produced destroyer, Jamaran, though internationally rated as a frigate, and an Iranian Ghadir-class submarine. It is said to be a sonar evading stealth submarine. Initially known as Moje, then Moje I, finally Jamaran, appears to be a development of the Alvand class.

The Moudge or Moje-class guided missile frigate entered service in 2010. Another frigate in the same class, named Damavand, was commissioned in the port of Bandar Anzali in the Caspian Sea in 2013. This ship, just like Jamaran, has the capability to carry helicopters, anti-ship missiles, surface-to-air missiles, torpedoes, modern guns and air defence guns. The ship is also equipped with electronic warfare devices. The two mentioned frigates brought Iran's frigate arsenal from three to five., Two others are being built, to be added to Iran's fleet of warships in the Persian Gulf.

In March 2006, the navy deployed a submarine named Nahang (Whale), with pictures broadcast by state media showing a minisub.

In February 2008, the Iranian Defense Ministry announced that 74 domestically produced "gunboats" (small missile boats) had entered service with the Iranian Navy. The Navy reported as to having the Hoot supercavitating torpedo and the Thaqeb (missile) in trials or service, though reliable information is scarce.

=== 2010–2020 ===
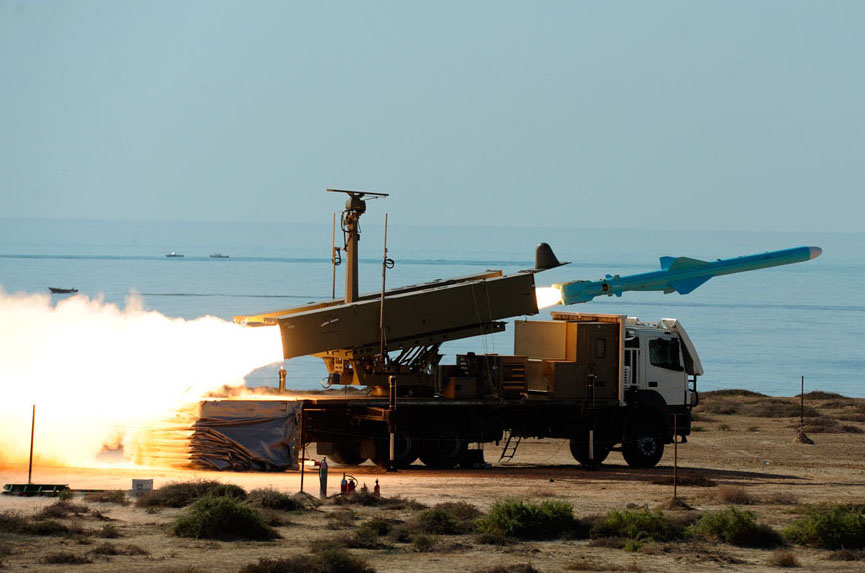
A Qader missile system, during the Velayat-90 Naval Exercise in 2012

In February 2010, Iran's Deputy Navy Commander Captain Mansour Maqsoudlou announced that Iran was planning to design and manufacture domestically built aircraft carriers. The initial designs for building the carriers were approved as of 2010 and the process of research and the design for the aircraft carrier is currently being looked into by the Iranian government.

In 2012, Iran overhauled one of its Kilo-class submarines, IRS Younis. Iran completed this re-haul at Bandar Abbas naval base. The Iranian Navy modernized and re-commissioned the 1,135-ton Bayandor-class corvettes, equipped with Noor anti-ship cruise missiles and torpedo launchers. Another modern frigate named Sahand, with 2,000 tons displacement was being fitted with weapons and equipment in Bandar Abbas naval base, and was planned for launch in 2013.

In July 2012, foreign analysts reported that Iran was gaining new deployment capabilities, allegedly to strike at US warships in the Persian Gulf in the case of an armed conflict, amassing an arsenal of anti-ship missiles, while expanding its fleet of Fast attack craft and submarines. Many of the systems were developed with foreign assistance, such as Silkworm anti-ship missiles, which are Chinese-made, and high-speed torpedoes based on Russian designs. In weeks prior, Iranian leadership had been threatening to shut down shipping in the gulf region as retaliation for any attacks by the United States on its nuclear facilities.

In February 2019, newspapers reported that Iran unveiled a domestically produced submarine capable of firing cruise missiles. In November 2019, Iran's navy announced the mass production of the Jask cruise missile, which is launched from Iranian submarines. It unveiled a vertical takeoff and landing (V/STOL) naval drone named Pelican-2, which had already been deployed on "naval fleets in international waters."

Port calls made by the Southern Fleet vessels in their missions during the 2010s

== See also ==
- Defense industry of Iran
- Indian Ocean Naval Symposium
- Iranian anti-access and area denial strategy in the Strait of Hormuz
- List of military equipment manufactured in Iran
- Military history of Iran
- Ebrahim Zolfaghari
