= Ghadir (missile) =

Ghadir قدیر
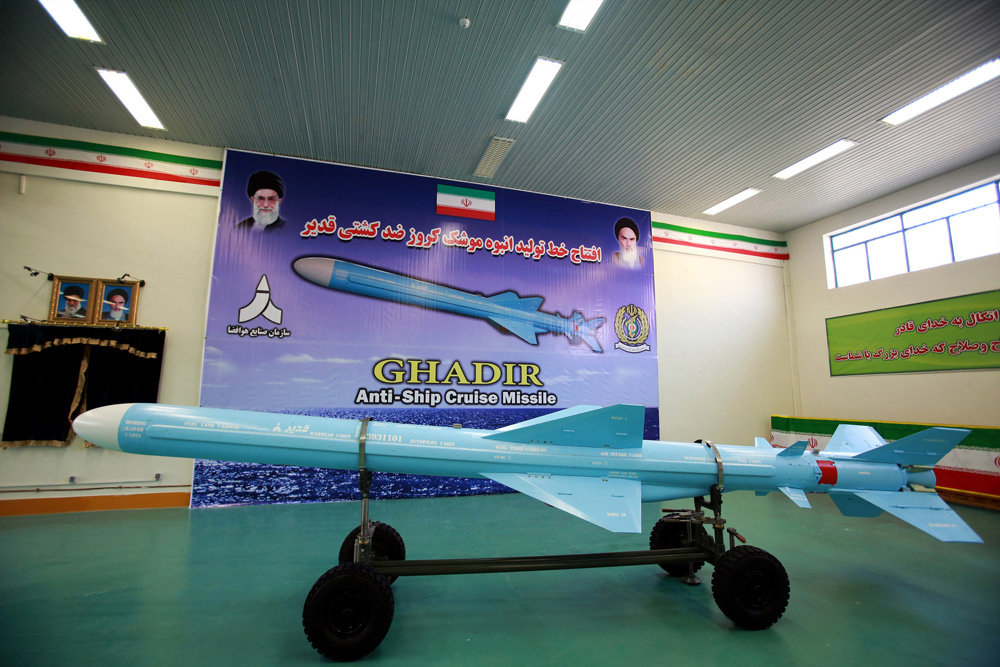
- Type: Anti-ship Cruise missile
- Place of origin: Iran

Service history
- In service: 2015

Production history
- Designer: Aerospace Industries Organization(AIO)

Specifications
- Operational range: 300 km
- Launch platform: Multiple naval vessels, helicopters

The Ghadir missile (Persian: موشک قدیر) is an Iranian anti-ship cruise missile with a range of 330 km. The missile is capable of being employed both from shore and from ships afloat. The missile was unveiled in Tehran in 2014 in an event attended Hossein Dehghan, Defense Minister of the Islamic Republic of Iran.
