= British Hovercraft Corporation BH.7 =

1970 class of British hovercraft

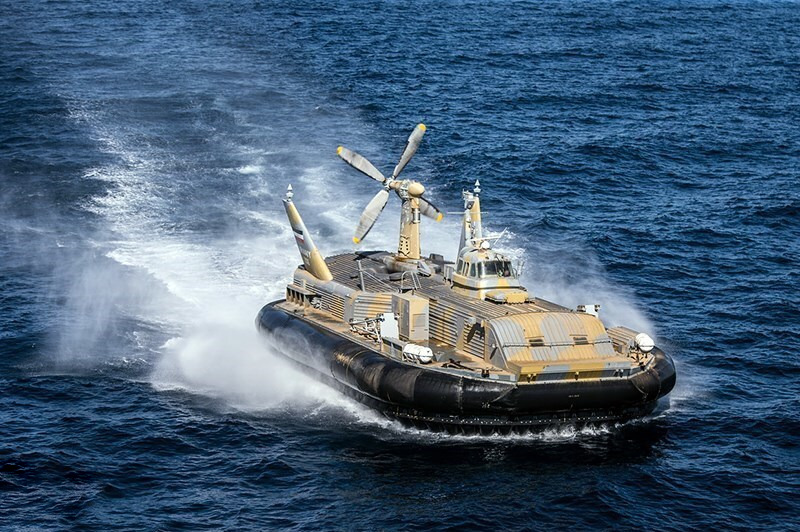
- BH7 of the armed forces of Iran

Class overview
- Name: BH.7 Wellington class
- Builders: British Hovercraft Corporation
- Preceded by: SR.N6
- Built: 1969-1975
- Completed: 7

General characteristics
- Type: hovercraft
- Tonnage: 18.3 tonnes
- Displacement: 56 tonnes
- Length: 23.9 m (78 ft)
- Beam: 13.8 m (45 ft)
- Height: 10.36 m (34.0 ft) (on landing pads)
- Installed power: 4,250 shp (3,170 kW)
- Propulsion: (Mk.2/4) 1 Rolls-Royce Marine Proteus 15M/541 gas turbine for lift and propulsion driving one four-bladed variable-pitch propeller
- Speed: 58 knots (107 km/h)
- Troops: 60
- Crew: 3

The British Hovercraft Corporation BH.7 (also known as the Wellington class) is a medium size hovercraft. It was the first quantity-production hovercraft to be specifically developed for military applications.

The prototype performed its first flight in November 1969; the type underwent extensive testing by the Royal Navy. The type performed several military roles, including mine countermeasures, fisheries protection, anti-submarine warfare, search and rescue, border patrol, naval surveillance, and transport duties; a civilian version was also developed. Even before the first BH.7 had been completed, export orders were already being secured for the type. The Imperial Iranian Navy would be a key military operator, having placed multiple orders for models of the BH.7. It was also intended for the Wellington class to be used by civil operators.

== Development ==
During the late 1950s and early 1960s, British inventor Sir Christopher Cockerell had developed a pioneering new form of transportation, embodied the form of the experimental SR.N1 vehicle, which became widely known as the hovercraft. British manufacturer Saunders-Roe, whom Cockerell had worked with in order to develop viable hovercraft, soon developed several commercially-viable vehicles, such as the SR.N4, a large cross-Channel ferry capable of seating up to 418 passengers along with 60 cars, and the SR.N6, the first commercially-active hovercraft, capable of seating a maximum of 58 passengers. The newly formed British Hovercraft Corporation (a merger of Saunders-Roe and Vickers hovercraft activities) decided to commit to developing a new hovercraft. Known as the BH.7, it was considerably larger than the preceding SR.N6, and able to carry far greater payloads.

Unlike predecessors, the BH.7 was the first quantity production hovercraft to be developed principally for military purposes. According to the British Hovercraft Corporation, military BH.7 models were capable of performing various coastal security missions, including smuggler interdiction, search and rescue operations, border patrol, naval surveillance, all with a greater degree of mobility and speed than conventional alternatives. It was proposed to outfit the type for the anti-shipping role via the installation of anti-ship missiles such as the French Exocet. Author J.R. Amyot observed the BH.7 to present highly favourable characteristics for amphibious operations and the mine countermeasures mission, noting its low noise output, high controllability, and low footprint pressure as positive attributes of its design.

The project received substantial support from the British Government, although not all commitments made would be fulfilled. During 1968, it was announced that plans for a version of the BH.7 for the British Army had been terminated; this cancellation heavily impacted the company's design team, as it had coincided with a separate government decision to halt work on a feasibility study into developing large ocean-going hovercraft. Such moves did not led to a complete elimination of state support from the venture as the Ministry of Technology had placed an order for a single BH.7, which greatly facilitated the launch of a Navy-orientated version.

== Design ==
The British Hovercraft Corporation BH.7 is a considerably larger hovercraft than the preceding SR.N6. Dependent on configuration and equipment fitted, each vehicle weighs around 60 tonnes and a payload capacity of roughly 15 tonnes; its civil version was reportedly designed to accommodate a maximum of eight cars and just over 70 passengers. In a military context, payloads could alternatively consist of palletised freight, up to six M101 howitzers or three Ferret armoured cars; a maximum of 92 fully equipped troops could be transported by a single BH.7. Typically, a military operated vehicle would be operated by a crew of five, comprising a pilot, a navigator/radar operator, an engineer/gunner, a dedicated gunner, and a commanding officer; most of the crew would be seated within the craft's centrally located control cabin, which provides all-round visibility.

Various weapons could be fitted upon the BH.7 to satisfy customer requests. It could accommodate the fitting and use of various guided missiles, including the Seacat surface-to-air missile, along with the SS.11 anti-tank guided missile, and the Exocet anti-shipping missile; numerous calibres of machine guns and the crew to operate them could be stationed around the vehicle as well. Installing armaments and other specialist equipment adds overall weight, thus separate combat-orientated and logistics-orientated variants of the BH.7 would be constructed. On assault-focused craft, the central space normally occupied by the main hold for logistics use would instead be repurposed for the operations room.

The BH.7 featured an integrated lift-and-propulsion system, which was powered by a Bristol Proteus gas turbine engine, capable of generating a maximum of 4,250 hp. To improve engine reliability, considerable research went into the adoption of new materials with greater resistance to corrosion even in salty environments. The propulsion system incorporated the world's largest air propeller, spanning 21-foot, at the time of its introduction; manufactured by Hawker Siddeley Dynamics, this four-bladed variable-pitch propeller was composed of an aluminium-fibreglass composite. Studies on the topic of adopt even larger propellers was also conducted by the firm. A 21-foot centrifugal fan forms the core of the lift system. These features combined facilitated the craft's cruise speed of around 60 knots; although this would be reduced to roughly half when traversing rough seas.

The BH.7 had benefitted from the company's latest advancements in flexible skirt design. Specifically, it was furnished with considerably longer fingers than prior hovercraft; this design change had reportedly resulted in the BH.7's specific power requirements being noticeably lower in comparison to many earlier vehicles. The skirt featured a higher outer hinge line; according to the periodical New Scientist, this refined skirt design was able to achieve a greater degree of both stability and safety, improving the craft's handling at sea; the firm's development efforts had also focused on reducing the skirt's maintenance costs. The skirt is primarily composed of a specially developed synthetic neoprene-coated nylon.

Many of the BH.7's systems and mechanisms draw upon those of the preceding SR.N4. During its design, considerable emphasis was placed on ease of maintenance; thus, a large proportion of repairs can be performed in the field, while a team of six maintenance workers would be typically required to service the craft. To increase the time between maintenance intervals, most of the materials used throughout the craft are corrosion-resistant; the structure is largely composed of reinforced plastics.

== Operational history ==
The prototype BH.7 Mk.2 first flew in November 1969 and was evaluated by the Royal Navy, being allocated the pennant number P235 and aircraft serial number XW255. It was trialled in a number of different roles from 1970 until 1983, including mine countermeasures, fisheries protection, and anti-submarine warfare, typically operating from RNAS Portland but also performing several overseas deployments as well; these tests helped the Royal Navy to determine its hovercraft requirements. The prototype was later acquired by the Hovercraft Museum at Lee-on-Solent.

By January 1968, Iran had placed an order for a pair of BH.7s, as well as for the smaller SR.N6. A total of two BH.7 Mk.4s and four BH.7 Mk.5As would be operated by the Imperial Iranian Navy during 1970s. The British Hovercraft Corporation considered the Middle East to be a key sales area for the type; a sales drive was targeted towards both Iran and Saudi Arabia. Following the Iranian Revolution of 1979, Iran became unable to acquire spare components and support from overseas due to the enactment of several trade embargoes; however, it has been able to continue to operate its hovercraft fleet. In the 2010s, its BH.7s have participated in exercises and routine operations alike. Iran claims that BH7s are to be adapted to function as high-speed missile platforms. Furthermore, Iran has reportedly locally manufactured similar vehicles.
