= Planned Canadian Forces projects =

List of future or planned Canadian Armed Forces projects

This is a list of future or planned Canadian Armed Forces projects.

== Canadian Army ==
| Project | Type | Number | Dates | Manufacturer | Details |
|---|---|---|---|---|---|
| Improved combat uniform | CADPAT | 24,000 | 2012– | | The decision to change the existing combat uniform is due to drying problems and poor integration with other operational equipment, as well as discolouration. The Department of National Defence estimates the production rate would be about 24,000 ICU uniforms per year. |
| Integrated Soldier System | Network-centric warfare | 17,000 | 2010– | | |
| Stealth snowmobile | Snowmobile | TBD | TBD | CrossChasm Technologies, Canada | The Canadian Forces is developing a "stealth" snowmobile which can travel more than 15 km in electric mode or hybrid mode. $550,000 prototype tender awarded to CrossChasm Technologies of Waterloo, Ontario. |
| Sniper Systems project | C14 Timberwolf and C15 long-range sniper weapon | TBD | TBD | | The Canadian army will receive modernized C14 Timberwolf and C15 long-range sniper weapon sniper rifles. The two phases project included a new telescopic optical rifle sight, new semi-automatic sniper weapons (SASW), a new sniper rifle for training, ammunition, ballistic calculators, night vision (Image Intensified and Thermal Imagery: II-TI) for the rifle, new lightweight thermal and wet weather clothing and more. |
| 3D Dismounted Training System | Virtual Training | TBD | 2023–2036 | TBD | The project cost is estimated between $100–249 million to provide a realistic virtual environment for dismounted soldiers and tank crew. |
| 84mm Ammunition Project | Carl Gustaf 8.4cm recoilless rifle | TBD | TBD | TBD | The project will provide new 84mm Smoke and Illumination ammunition for the existing Carl Gustav weapon system. The project cost is estimated between $20–49 million. |
| 84mm Carl Gustaf Upgrade | TBD | TBD | 2019–2036 | TBD | The project will replace the existing obsolete optical sight with a more sophisticated sighting system to improve accuracy, and which includes a target range finder. The project also include weapon simulator. The cost is estimated between $50–99 million. |
| Active Protection System | TBD | TBD | 2022–2036 | TBD | The project will introduce new Active Protection System as per NATO STANAG 4686 for unspecific armoured fighting vehicle, which include sensors and counter-measure munitions. The project cost is estimated between $100–249 million. |
| Active Radio Frequencies Protection Systems | TBD | TBD | 2023–2036 | TBD | Acquisition of sensor to detect radio frequency energy to detect improvised explosive devices (IED). The project cost is estimated between $50–99 million. |
| Advanced Improvised Explosive Device (IED) Detection and Defeat | TBD | TBD | 2019–2036 | TBD | The project will examine land and air based remote system to detect and defeat land mine and improvised explosive devices. The project cost is estimated between $100–249 million. |
| Advanced Sub-Unit Water Purification System | TBD | TBD | 2016–2026 | Rheinmetall Canada | Acquisition of water purification system for up to 250 soldiers. The project funding range is $100 million to $249 million. |
| Advanced Water Supply System | TBD | TBD | 2022–2036 | TBD | The water supply system will replace the existing system with water system, storage and supply. The project cost is estimate between $50–99 million. |
| Airspace Coordination Center Modernization | TBD | TBD | 2017–2021 | TBD | Modernization of LAV-III fleet with new computer and data link to improve network communication with Canadian forces and allied platforms. The project cost is estimated between $20–49 million. |
| Anti Tank Guided Missile Replacement | TBD | TBD | 2026–2036+ | TBD | Replacement of existing anti-tank weapons with a new multi-purpose, anti-armour, anti-structure. The weapon will be both portable / mounted system. The project estimate is between $500 million to $1 billion. |
| Armoured Combat Support Vehicle (ACSV) | LAV 6.0 | 360 | 2020–2025 | General Dynamics Land Systems – Canada | General utility armoured vehicle replacement of existing M113 and LAV-II (Bison) fleet; Will assist heavy- and light- armoured fighting vehicle on the battlefield.; New ACSV will have different configurations including: ambulance, command and control, and maintenance.; Sole-sourced contract for 360 LAV 6.0 vehicles at a cost of $2 billion was signed in August 2019 with General Dynamics Land Systems - Canada, with deliveries starting in late 2020. |
| Bridge and Gap Crossing Modernization | TBD | TBD | 2018–2036 | TBD | The project will deliver light, medium and heavy bridging equipment to replace existing equipment. The equipment includes: infantry foot bridges, light support bridges, medium support bridges, heavy support bridges, heavy assault bridges, line of communication bridges and floating bridges and rafts. The project cost is estimated between $100–249 million. |
| Body Armour Modernization | TBD | TBD | 2018–2036 | TBD | The project will replace existing body armour with a new suite of lightweight and modular armour. The project cost is estimated between $50–99 million. |
| CF Land Electronic Warfare Modernization | TBD | TBD | 2019–2036 | TBD | The project includes new electronic warfare support, protection against electronic attack, counter-command and control electronic attack, electronic warfare planning and management and analysis, and electronic warfare vehicles. The project cost is estimated between $100–249 million. |
| Soldier Helmet Modernization | TBD | TBD | 2018–2036 | NP Aerospace, Canada | The project will replace existing combat helmet with a modular and scalable combat helmet. The new combat helmet will improve blast, ballistic and blunt protection.; Project cost is estimated between $20–49 million.; Morgan Advanced Materials, was selected to provide their full-cut LASA AC914 for combat operations and the high-cut LASA AC915 for special operations. NP Aerospace will supply the helmet over seven years. |
| Night Vision System Modernization | TBD | TBD | 2018–2025 | TBD | The project included laser range finder, laser designator, thermal image, I2 tubes. The project will cost between $100–249 million. |
| Light Utility Vehicle | TBD | TBD | 2018–2036 | TBD | Replacement of G-wagon and Chevrolet Silverado MilCOTS which are at end of useful lives. The cost is estimated between $100–249 million. |
| Logistics Vehicle Modernization | Offroad truck | 1500 | 2019–2031 | Consortium led by General Dynamics Land Systems – Canada | Acquisition of 1000 Zetros 4x4 light trucks and approximately 500 Zetros 8x8 heavy trucks, and their associated mission equipment. The project will cost $1.5 billion to purchase the equipment and up to $1.08 billion for support for up to 25 years. |
| Long Range Precision Strike - Land | M142 HIMARS Multiple-launch rocket system | 26 | 2028- | Lockheed Martin, USA | Will provide a new long-range precision strike capability, including standard range (80 km); extended range and anti-ship missiles. Foreign Military Sales request submitted for M142 HIMARS, but contract not signed as of December 2025. In May, 2026 the US DOD contracted Lockheed Martin to produce HIMARS systems for Canada and other customers. |
| Canadian Modular Assault Rifle | C25 General Service rifle and C26 Full Spectrum rifle | 30,000 plus options for 35,400 more | 2026– | Colt Canada | Replacement of C7 and C8 with two new assault rifles designated C25 General Service variant and the C26 Full Spectrum variant. Includes new optics, suppressors and ammunition. |
| Soldier System 2030 | TBD | TBD | 2025–2036+ | TBD | The project includes a new Integrated Soldier System, combat uniform, sniper and weapons systems modernization. The cost is estimated between $100–249 million. |
| Heavy Direct Fire Modernization | Main Battle Tank | TBD | 2030– | TBD | Replacements for the Leopard 2 fleet. |
| Ground Based Air and Munitions Defence | TBD | TBD | 2018–2036 | TBD | The project will introduce a new, off-the-shelf weapon system to protect from a variety of air threats which include: radar, network and communication system as well as munition and weapon systems. |
| Future Family of Unmanned Ground Vehicles | TBD | TBD | 2022–2036 | TBD | The project will deliver a fleet of non-lethal, unmanned ground vehicles (UGN) for search and rescue, CBRN, and casualty extraction. |
| Light Armoured Vehicle Reconnaissance Surveillance System (LRSS) | LAV 6.0 RECCE | 66 | 2021–2024 | Canada /, United States | Will replace the Coyote Reconnaissance Vehicle with 66 LAV 6.0 chassis by 2021. |
| Army Modernization (Inflection Point 2025) | Canadian Army Modernization | TBD | 2025 - ??? | TBD, multiple | Will restructure divisional assists, address provisioning, and take Canada from "the army we have" to the "army we need". |
| Indirect Fires Modernization (Howitzer) (Note: In 2025, the Canadian Army posted a RFI (request for information) regarding the purchase of a new self-propelled howitzer with its "Indirect Fire Modernization" programme.: The requests include a top speed of 80km/h and an operational range of 450km which would exclude tracked vehicles. The request includes minimal lethality requirements: Calibre: 155mm L/52; Range: a range of at least 30 km with conventional munitions (M795); a range of at least 40 km with a next generation base bleed projectile (M1128); Capable to fire: precision guided projectiles (M982 & M1156); sensor Fuzed Anti-Armour Munitions (SMArt 155 or Bofors/Nexter Bonus); MRSI (Multiple Round, Simultaneous Impact); detect and neutralise close range threats in a direct fire role; Shoot and scoot capability: a battery of 6 howitzers must engage a target with a minimum of 96 rounds and come out of action in less than a total of three minutes; howitzers must displace at least 500m in less than two minutes after firing in a tactical environment) | TBD | 80–102 | 2031– | TBD | Will replace existing howitzers with new self-propelled platforms for increased tactical and operational survivability, mobility, and range. |
| Indirect Fires Modernization (Mortar) | TBD | 133–184 | 2031– | TBD | Will replace existing mortars with new self-propelled platforms for increased tactical and operational survivability, mobility, and range. |

== Royal Canadian Air Force ==
| Model | Type | Number | Dates | Manufacturer | Details |
|---|---|---|---|---|---|
| CC-295 Kingfisher | Fixed Wing Search and Rescue | 16 | 2015–2030 | Airbus Defence and Space; Spain / Europe | Replacement for CC-115 Buffalo and CC-130H Hercules search and rescue aircraft. In late 2016, the C-295 won the competition to replace the current aircraft. In July 2019 the first C-295 completed its maiden flight. The first delivery took place at the end of 2019. All aircraft were expected to be delivered by the end of 2022. However, initial operating capability is delayed until 2025/26. |
| General Atomics MQ-9B | Unmanned aircraft system | 11 | 2028–2033 | General Atomics United States | Originally called Joint Unmanned Surveillance and Target Acquisition System. The UAS will be used for surveillance of the maritime and northern approaches to Canada and support to search and rescue operations. When deployed overseas, the UAS will be capable of detecting, recognizing, identifying, and tracking targets of interest. It will have a precision strike capability. On December 19, 2023, the Government of Canada announced that 11 MQ-9B would be acquired. |
| CC-330 Husky / Airbus A330 MRTT | Multi-role tanker transport | 9 | 2018–2031 | Airbus Defence and Space, Spain / Europe | Replacement for CC-150 Polaris. In July 2022, the Government of Canada announced a deal to acquire two used Airbus A330-200s which would be modified to A330 MRTT configuration, with four more to be acquired later, for a total of six aircraft. In July 2023, the order was increased to nine aircraft, eight of which will be MRTT and one for VIP transportation. Four aircraft will be purchased new from Airbus, with five aircraft purchased used from the commercial market. The first aircraft was delivered in August 2023. |
| Pilatus PC-21 (CT-157 Siskin II) | Snowbirds aircraft replacement | TBC | Approx. 2030 | Pilatus, Switzerland | The team's CT-114 Tutors were undergoing a life extension, designed to keep them flying until 2030. In May, 2026 the government announced that the Tutors will be grounded after the 2026 season. They will be replaced by an unspecified number of PC-21s, which will be added to the existing order for advanced trainer aircraft. |
| P-8 Poseidon | Maritime patrol aircraft / Anti-submarine warfare | 14 + 2 option | 2026–2033 | Boeing, United States | Replacement for the CP-140 Aurora. The project will provide a long range Command, Control, Communications and Computers (C4) and Intelligence, Surveillance and Reconnaissance (ISR) aircraft. The Department of National Defence and the Royal Canadian Air Force have determined that the P-8A Poseidon is the only aircraft that will meet the military's requirements. Up to 16 are being considered at a cost of up to $5 billion. A letter of request for the acquisition price has been submitted to the U.S. government. Canadian manufacturer Bombardier submitted an unsolicited bid to develop an aircraft to meet the CMMA requirements with General Dynamics. On November 30, 2023, the Canadian government announced that they have finalized the purchase of 14 P-8A Poseidon aircraft, with an option for two more. |
| AIM-9X | Short Range Missile | | 2024–2036 | Raytheon | The project is acquiring AIM-9X Block II and Block II+ missiles for the CF-188 and future fighter aircraft. |
| AIM-120D | Medium Range Air-to-Air Missile | | 2024–2027 | Raytheon | Replacement of semi-active homing missiles to Advanced Medium Range Air-to-Air Missiles. |
| TBD | Long Range Air-to-Air Missile | | 2026–2036 | TBD | New long range air-to-air missile weapon system for future fighter aircraft. |
| Joint strike missile | Air-launched cruise missile | | TBD | Kongsberg | Long-range cruise missile for future fighters. Contract signed in June 2026 but delivery dates and quantities not announced. |
| F-35A | Future Fighter Capability | 88 | 2026–2036 | Lockheed-Martin | Replacement for CF-188 Hornet. The project will acquire new fighter aircraft with a precision Air-to-Surface, Air-to-Air and Air-to-Ground capacity. The future fighter aircraft will also have a non-traditional Intelligence, Surveillance and Reconnaissance (ISR) for NORAD. The CF-188 Hornet end of useful life is estimated in 2025, though this required extension. The JAS 39 Gripen E and the Lockheed Martin F-35 Lightning II were the final, of several, contenders to replace the aging fleet of CF-188 Hornet. As of March 2022, Canada began initial negotiations with Lockheed Martin for 88 F-35As. In December 2022 the Government of Canada placed an initial order for 16 F-35As. On January 9, 2023, the deal for the 88 jets was finalized. |
| Next Tactical Aviation Capability Set | Tactical helicopters | TBD | 2033–2038 | TBD | The project will deliver a new fleet of helicopter to replace the aging CH-146. On April 8, 2024, the Government of Canada announced that $18.4 billion would be spent over 20 years, to acquire new tactical helicopters. The new fleet will provide firepower, reconnaissance and surveillance, and SOF capabilities. |
| Utility Transport Aircraft | CC-138 Twin Otter replacement | TBD | TBD | TBD | Small fleet of new aircraft to replace aging CC-138 Twin Otter. |
| Saab GlobalEye | Airborne Early Warning and Control (AEW&C) | 6 | TBD | Saab AB, Sweden Bombardier Aviation, Canada | Canada and Saab are still working through the formal negotiations, but the deal is estimated at C$5 billion on the acquisition of AEW&C capabilities. The Government of Canada announced Saab of Sweden as the preferred supplier on May 27, 2026. |
| M-346 | Future Fighter Lead-In Training (FFLIT) advanced jet trainer | TBD | TBD | Leonardo, Italy | On June 16, 2026, Canadian Prime Minister Mark Carney and Italian Prime Minister Giorgia Meloni announced bilateral talks at the G7 summit to acquire the Leonardo M-346 advanced jet trainer for the Royal Canadian Air Force. The RCAF's previous advanced jet trainer, the BAE CT-155 Hawk, could no longer support modern pilot training for fifth-generation fighters and was retired in March 2024 after 24 years of operational service. |

== Royal Canadian Navy ==
| Model | Type | Number | Dates | Manufacturer | Details |
|---|---|---|---|---|---|
| Protecteur-class auxiliary vessel | Joint Support Ship | 2 | 2017–2024 | TKMS, Canada / Seaspan Marine Corporation, Canada | The Joint Support Ship Project (abbreviated as JSS Project) is a project undertaken by the Canadian Forces to provide the Royal Canadian Navy with two multirole naval vessels. These vessels will enable a Naval Task Force to remain at sea for six times longer than is currently possible. The Joint Support ships will provide the RCN with a greater flexibility to conduct a wide range of operations both domestically and internationally. Originally announced in 2004, the Berlin-class AOR was selected on June 2, 2013. Construction began in June 2018. |
| River-class destroyer | Guided missile destroyer (DDGH) | 15 | 2025–2050 | Halifax Shipyard, Canada | The River-class destroyer is planned to replace the former Iroquois-class destroyer and the Halifax-class frigate. The ships are scheduled to start full rate construction in 2025. |
| Type 212CD | Attack submarine | up to 12 | 2034- | TKMS | The project plans to acquire up to 12 conventional (diesel-electric/AIP) submarines for the RCN. In August 2025, the qualified bidders were narrowed to the Type 212CD and the KSS-III.. TKMS was chosen as the preferred bidder on July 6, 2026. |
| Naval Remote Weapon Station | Remote Weapon Station | 58 | 2017 | Raytheon Canada | Up to 58 remote weapons stations are to be delivered starting in 2017 for installation on the modernized Halifax-class frigates and the Protecteur-class auxiliary vessel, as well as for shore-based training. |
| Mark 54 | Lightweight torpedo | 425 | 2020–2024 | Raytheon United States | Upgrade kits ordered for existing Mark 46 torpedoes, to improve performance in northern and Arctic waters by attacking and destroying submarine at ice-edge. |
| High Frequency Surface Wave Radar | Radar | TBD | 2014 | Raytheon Canada | The Canadian Forces will receive a new radar able to provide a persistent active surveillance of ship traffic in the 200 nautical mile Exclusive Economic Zone. The HFSWR is able to provides coverage beyond conventional line of sight radars. The $7 million project will be used to build and install a next-generation High Frequency Surface Wave Radar (HFSWR) system and will be based in Nova Scotia |
| Torpedo Countermeasure Hard Kill | Countermeasure | N/A | 2018–2025 | N/A | The navy will receive a torpedo countermeasure hard kill weapon system to complement the soft-kill on board the Upholder/Victoria-class submarine, Halifax-class frigate and Protecteur-class auxiliary vessel and may be applicable to the Canadian Surface Combatant. |
| Point Defence Missile System Upgrade | Surface-to-air missile | N/A | 2020 | Raytheon United States | The Royal Canadian Navy will upgrade the current Evolved Sea Sparrow Missile (ESSM) point defence missile system on its Halifax Class frigates to the Block 2 version. |
| Unmanned surface vehicle | USV | N/A | N/A | N/A | In 2012, the government of Canada announced a $3-million to support research on USV technologies. The status of the program was unknown as of 2021. |

== See also ==
- List of aircraft of the Royal Canadian Air Force
- National Shipbuilding Procurement Strategy
- Canada-class submarine, a 1987 proposal for a class of nuclear-powered attack submarines that was cancelled in 1989
- General Purpose Frigate, a failed Canadian procurement project of the 1960s
