= Canadian Patrol Submarine =

Procurement project for Canadian Navy

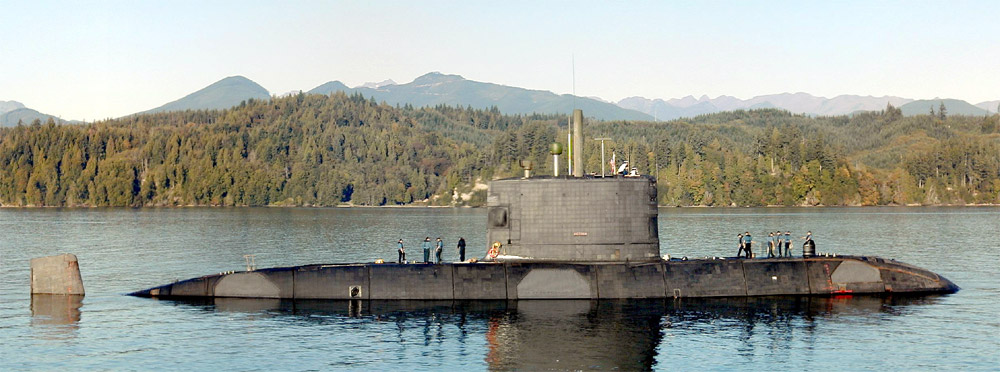
- HMCS Victoria, the lead vessel of Canada's active Victoria-class submarines, will be replaced by the new vessels.

Class overview
- Name: Canadian Patrol Submarine
- Builders: TKMS, Kiel and Wismar
- Operators: Royal Canadian Navy
- Preceded by: Victoria-class submarines
- Cost: $26 billion (2026)
- In service: 2034-2036
- Planned: 12

General characteristics
- Type: Attack submarine
- Displacement: 2,500 t (2,500 long tons) surfaced, 2,800 t (2,800 long tons) submerged
- Length: 73 m (239 ft 6 in)
- Beam: 10 m (32 ft 10 in)
- Draught: 7 m (23 ft 0 in)
- Propulsion: Lithium battery; New 4th gen AIP PEM fuel cells (HDW); Diesel engines: 2 MTU 4000; Lithium battery
- Speed: > 20 knots (37 km/h; 23 mph)
- Endurance: 41 days
- Complement: 27-30
- Sensors & processing systems: Combat system: ORCCA supplied by kta naval systems (consortium TKMS, Atlas Elektronik, Kongsberg); Sonars: Combat sonar suite: not defined yet; Mine avoidance and navigation: Kongsberg SA9510S MkII; Sea bed navigation: EM2040 Mil and EA640 echosounders; Optical sensors: Hensoldt OMS 150 and OMS 300 optronics masts; Hensoldt i360°OS panoramic surveillance system; Radar: Indra navigation radar
- Electronic warfare & decoys: Indra digital EW systems
- Armament: Up to 14 torpedoes, missiles and drones; Torpedoes: 6 × 533 mm (21.0 in) torpedo tubes; CHWT (Common Heavy Weight Torpedo), a successor to the DM2A4 Hake heavy torpedoes, also known as DM2A5; Seaspider anti-torpedo torpedo; Missiles: Anti-air / anti light vessel: IDAS; Under consideration: NSM-SL, 3SM Tyrfing; Unmanned underwater vehicle: IAI BlueWhale potentially

The Canadian Patrol Submarine Project (CPSP) is a procurement initiative that began in 2021 to replace the Victoria-class submarines of the Royal Canadian Navy (RCN). The project aims to procure up to 12 submarines to enable simultaneous patrols in the Atlantic, Pacific and Arctic oceans. In August 2025, the Canadian government shortlisted two suppliers, TKMS (Type 212CD) and Hanwha Ocean (KSS-III Batch-II), and conducted in-depth engagements with both companies. On 6 July 2026, TKMS's Type 212CD was selected as the next submarine.

== Background ==
Built for the Royal Navy between 1983 and 1993, the four Victoria-class submarines were purchased by Canada in 1998. The Victoria class will reach the end of their service lives in the mid- to late-2030s. The 2017 defence policy did not commit to a replacement for the submarines but did promise funds to modernize and continue operating the Victoria class.

The CPSP was established in 2021 to identify the RCN's requirements for a new submarine and make recommendations to the government. By 2023, the Ottawa Citizen reported that the RCN was pitching the purchase of up to 12 submarines at a cost of approximately $60 billion CAD.

In 2023, the following 15 draft high-level mandatory requirements were documented as part of initial exploratory work:

- The platform shall be a submarine that can perform patrol and surveillance missions in Canada's maritime approaches and littoral waters.
- The platform shall be conventionally powered (diesel-electric).
- The platform shall have an operational range of at least 7,000 nautical miles (13,000 km; 8,100 mi) on diesel fuel at 8 knots.
- The platform shall be able to transit at least 3,000 nautical miles (5,600 km; 3,500 mi) submerged on batteries/AIP before snorting.
- The platform shall be able to operate in first-year Arctic ice (up to 1 m thick) and survive in polar-class cold-weather conditions.
- The platform shall have a low acoustic signature consistent with modern SSK design standards (radiated noise ≤ 110 dB/1 μPa/√Hz re 1 Hz at 1 kHz).
- The platform shall be fitted with a bow sonar array, flank arrays, and a towed array sonar.
- The platform shall have at least six 533 mm torpedo tubes and be able to store and launch torpedoes, missiles, mines and UUVs.
- The platform shall provide secure VLF/HF/UHF and SATCOM communications with Canadian and allied networks.
- The platform shall be fully interoperable with NATO and Five-Eyes submarine rescue and C4ISR standards.
- The platform shall meet survivability criteria for shock, fire, flooding and chemical-biological-radiological threats.
- The platform shall accommodate a mixed-gender crew of at least 60 personnel for deployments up to 60 days without resupply.
- The platform shall be designed for through-life support in Canada, including training simulators and Canadian-sourced spare parts.
- The platform shall deliver minimum 25 % Canadian content by value over the total programme life.
- The platform shall be certified to Transport Canada/RMRS safety rules and be upgradeable through at least two mid-life modernisations.

An October 2023 presentation by Royal Canadian Navy Vice Admiral Angus Topshee further outlined the requirements of avoiding hydrocarbon discharge in MARPOL arctic zones, and for the chosen submarine design to already be in service. The government defence policy update, released in April 2024, said Canada would "explore options" for a replacement but did not explicitly commit to new submarines. However, at the NATO summit in July 2024, the Canadian Minister of National Defence Bill Blair announced that Canada was formally moving ahead with the project. The government issued a formal Request for Information (RFI) in September 2024.

The 2024 formal RFI outlined a revised set of 15 draft high-level mandatory requirements, including the following:

- Urgency, availability, and sustainment – the ability to deliver the first submarine, training and maintenance facilities by 2035.
- Fleet size – three submarines must be available for deployment simultaneously, and three additional boats must be available for training and exercises.
- Endurance and persistence – range of at least 7,000 nautical miles (13,000 km; 8,100 mi) and at least 21 days of submerged endurance on station.
- Lethality – armed with torpedoes, anti-ship missiles and long-range precision land-attack missiles.
- Operating environment – able to operate worldwide from the tropics to the Arctic. They must be able to operate near, in and if necessary, under ice for limited periods of time.

== Contenders ==
Prior to the RFI being issued, the project team visited shipyards in six countries. Contenders included several in-service or in-construction designs. Other contenders are not yet in production.

- C71 Expeditionary from Sweden's Saab
- Orka class from France's Naval Group
- KSS-III from South Korea's Hanwha Ocean
- S-80 Plus from Spain's Navantia
- Taigei class from Japan's Mitsubishi Heavy Industries
- Type 212CD from Thyssenkrupp Marine Systems, jointly developed by Germany and Norway

Japan's embassy issued a statement in late 2024 that Japanese companies would not participate in the procurement, but did not offer any reasons. In August 2025, the government short-listed the Type 212CD and KSS-III.

On 6 July 2026, TKMS's Type 212CD was selected as the next submarine.

== See also ==
- Canada-class submarine
- Planned Canadian Forces projects

Similar procurement projects

- Korean Attack Submarine program
- Walrus-class replacement program
- SSN-AUKUS
- Submarine-building Perspective Plan
