= Jang Yeongsil-class submarine =

South Korean submarine class

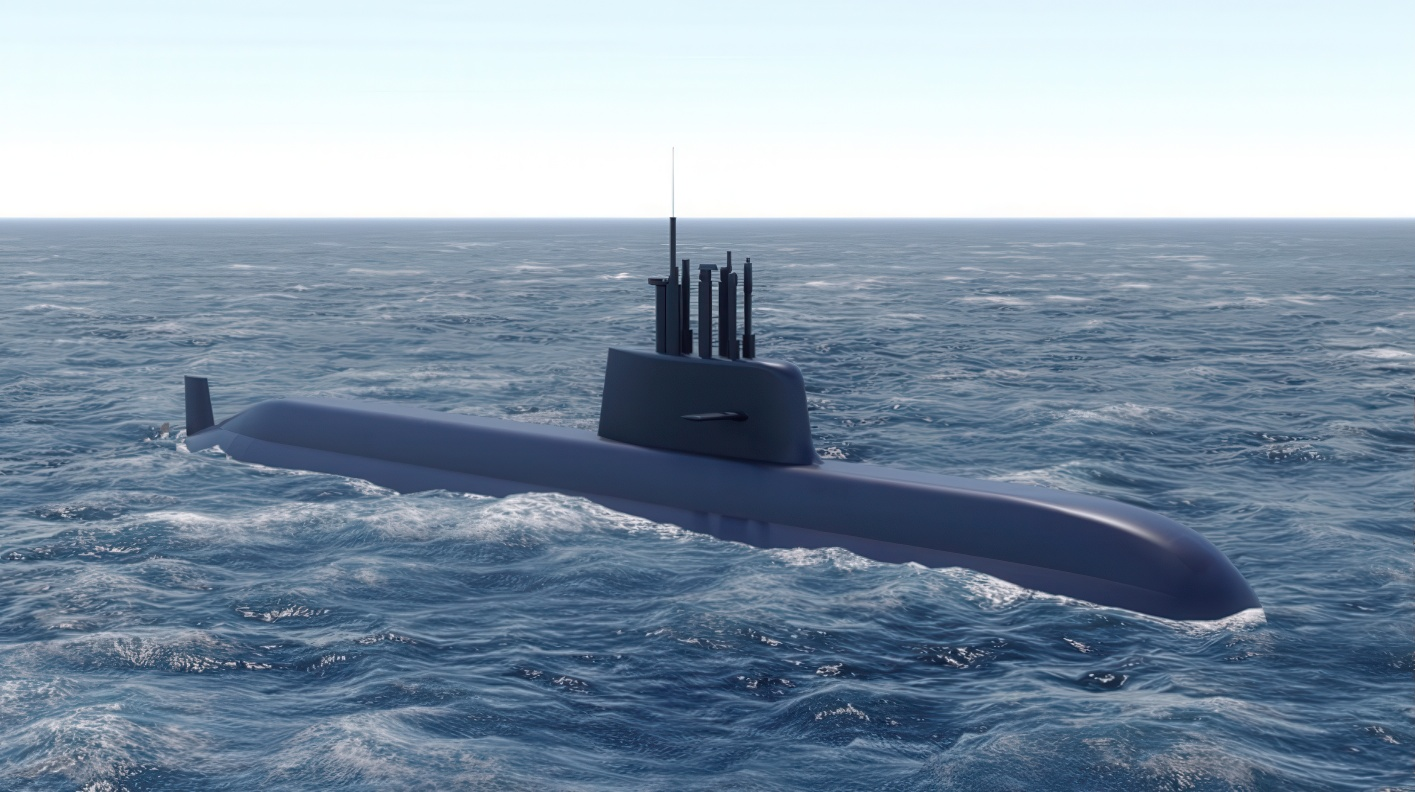

Class overview
- Name: Jang Yeongsil class
- Builders: Hanwha Ocean
- Operators: Republic of Korea Navy
- Preceded by: Dosan Ahn Changho class
- Built: 2021–present

General characteristics
- Type: Attack submarine with ballistic missile launching capabilities
- Displacement: 3,600 tonnes (3,500 long tons) (surfaced); 4,000 tonnes (3,900 long tons) (submerged)
- Length: 89.3 m (293 ft 0 in)
- Beam: 9.7 m (31 ft 10 in)
- Propulsion: Diesel-electric propulsion; 3 × MTU 12V 4000 U83 marine diesel engines; Air-independent propulsion (AIP); 4 × Bumhan Industries PH1 PEM fuel cells, each with 100 kW output with increased hydrogen and liquid oxygen storage; Samsung SDI lithium-ion batteries
- Speed: 12 knots (22 km/h; 14 mph) (surfaced); 6 knots (11 km/h; 6.9 mph) (submerged) on fuel cell operation; 20 knots (37 km/h; 23 mph) (submerged)
- Range: 10,000 nautical miles (19,000 km; 12,000 mi)
- Endurance: 20+ days (submerged)
- Complement: 50
- Sensors & processing systems: Combat suite: Hanwha-developed "Combat Management System" (CMS); Sonar: LIG Nex1-developed sonar suite; Thales-developed mine-avoidance sonar; Electronic warfare: Indra-developed radar electronic support measurement (RESM); Other processing systems: Safran-developed "Series 30" optronic surveillance mast; Babcock-developed "Weapons Handling and Launch System" (WHLS); ECA Group-developed steering consoles
- Armament: 6 × 533 mm (21 in) torpedo tubes; LIG Nex1 K761 Tiger Shark heavyweight torpedoes; C-Star-III anti-ship cruise missiles; LIG Nex1 submarine-launched mobile sea mine; 10 × K-VLS cells; 10 × Hyunmoo 4-4 submarine-launched ballistic missile; Chonryong land attack cruise missiles

The KSS-III Batch-II (Korean Submarine-III Batch-II; Korean: 한국형 잠수함-III 배치-II; Hanja: 韓國型潛水艦-III 배치-II), officially called Jang Yeongsil class (Korean: 장영실급 잠수함; Hanja: 蔣英實級潛水艦; RR: Jang-yeongsil-geup Jamsuham) is a series of diesel-electric attack and ballistic missile submarines currently being built for the Republic of Korea Navy (ROKN), jointly by Hanwha Ocean.

The KSS-III Batch-II initiative, which involves domestically building three new submarines, each 89 m (292 ft 0 in) long and displacing 3,600 tonnes (3,500 long tons), was implemented from 2016 to 2029 with an investment of approximately KRW 3.41 trillion.

== History ==
KSS-III is a 3,000-tonne (3,000-long-ton) submarine acquisition program confirmed at the 16th Defense Acquisition Program Promotion Meeting in 2007. Batch-I was the Dosan Ahn Changho class, and Jang Yeongsil is the first vessel of Batch-II. The Jang Yeongsil class is a significantly improved successor to Dosan Ahn Changho class. It is equipped with a larger vertical launcher, capable of firing submarine-launched ballistic missiles (SLBMs), a penetrating periscope, an auxiliary propulsion system, and an independently developed lithium battery system. It is the third submarine in the world to be equipped with lithium-ion batteries, enabling it to remain submerged for up to three weeks without nuclear propulsion.

It was named after Jang Yeongsil, a Silhak scholar who led science and technology in the Joseon Dynasty, with the symbolic meaning of protecting the country with the excellent technology of South Korea's defense industry. Jang Yeongsil is considered the greatest scientist of the Joseon Dynasty who created the armillary sphere and the water clock Borugak Jagyeongnu (혼천의), and he is the first scientist to be included in the name of a submarine.

On October 22, 2025, the Republic of Korea Navy and the Defense Acquisition Program Administration held a launching ceremony for the class, the first ship of the KSS-III Batch-II, at Hanwha Ocean's Geoje Shipyard in Geoje, South Gyeongsang Province.

== Design ==
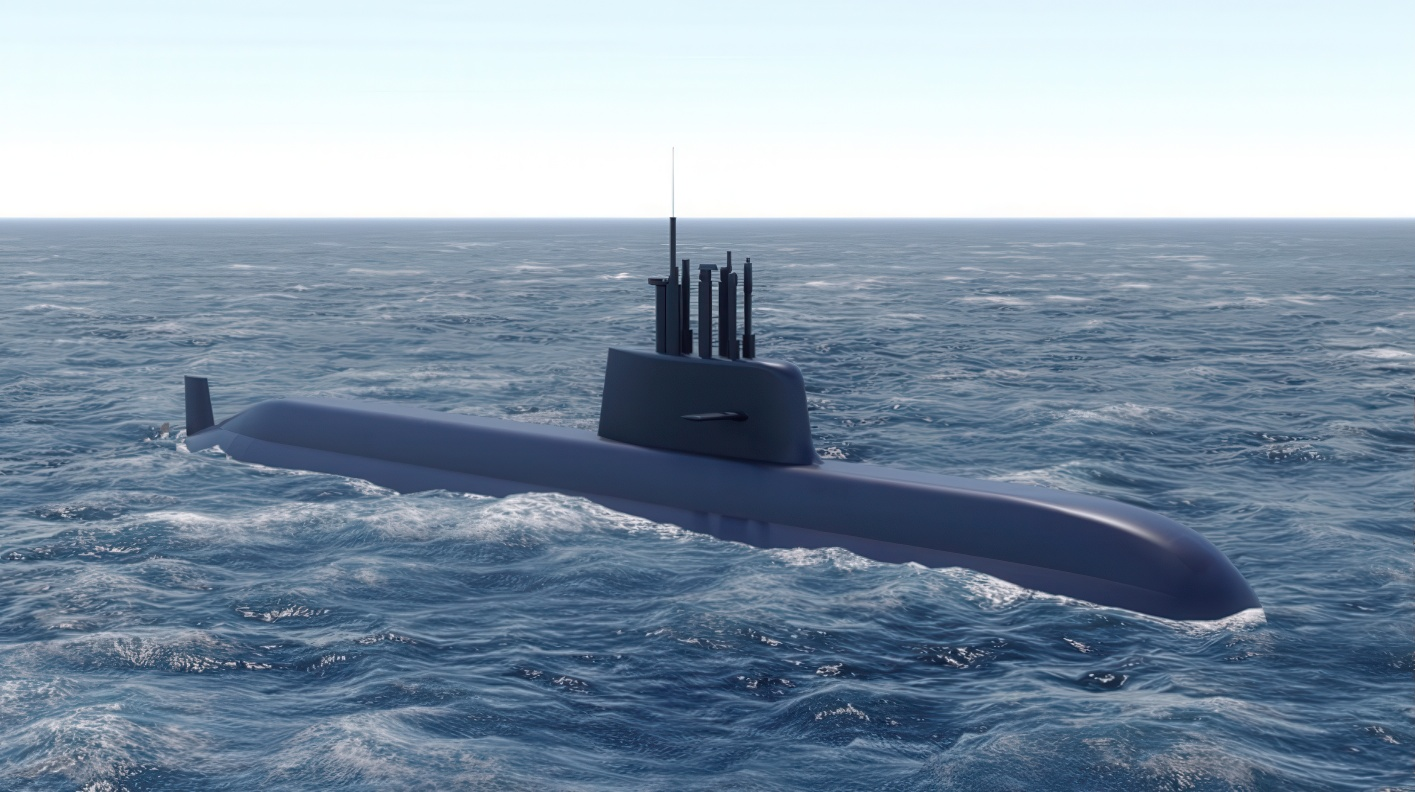
Graphic image of Jang Yeongsil class

Compared to Batch-I, the Batch-II has a larger overall length and width due to its increased displacement. Batch-I had a total length of 83.5 m (273 ft 11 in) and a displacement of 3,000 tons, but Batch-2 was expanded to 89.4 m (293 ft 4 in) and a displacement of 3,600 t (3,500 long tons), and as a result, the number of vertical launch tubes increased from 6 to 10.

This is the first submarine in the ROKN to be equipped with lithium batteries and an air-independent propulsion (AIP) system at the same time, which has extended its submerged time. The Batch-I, which was the first batch, used a propulsion system that combined lead-acid batteries and AIP, but the second batch used a propulsion system that combined lithium-ion batteries and AIP. Lead-acid batteries have low energy density, a short lifespan, and the risk of overheating or explosion, whereas lithium-ion batteries have a high energy density, more than twice that of existing lead-acid batteries, and a short charging time. This has improved underwater operation time and stealth, with a 160% increase in submerged range and 300% increase in submerged time compared to lead-acid batteries, enabling submerged operation for approximately three weeks. The operating range is 7,000 nautical miles (13,000 km; 8,100 mi), the submerged speed is 20 knots (37 km/h; 23 mph), and the submerged depth is over 400 m (1,300 ft).

== Armaments ==
The weapon system has also been strengthened compared to the Dosan Ahn Chang-ho class. The vertical launch system (VLS), capable of carrying submarine-launched ballistic missiles (SLBMs), has been expanded from the original six cells to ten.

The combat and sonar systems have also been enhanced compared to existing vessels, with enhanced information processing, target detection, and land-based target strike capabilities. The vessel is equipped with a curved array sonar developed using domestic technology for submarines. While existing cylindrical array sonar requires the submarine to change course to pinpoint the target, the curved array sonar has three times more detection elements than cylindrical sonar, enabling enhanced detection without the submarine having to change course. Like Batch-1, it features an anechoic coating and dual-elastic mount, and small fins attached to the center cap of the propeller, like wings, reduce noise.

== Ships in the class ==
Name	Pennant Number	Builder	Laid Down	Launched	Commissioned	Status
ROKS Jang Yeong-sil	SS-087	Hanwha Ocean	30 March 2023	22 October 2025	Scheduled for 2026	Launched
TBA		Hanwha Ocean	12 July 2024		Scheduled for 2028	Under construction
TBA		Hanwha Ocean	30 Oct 2024		Scheduled for 2031	Under construction

== Operators ==
=== Future operators ===
South Korea (3)

=== Failed Bids ===
Canada (12) — Competed with the TKMS Type 212CD under the Canadian Patrol Submarine Project. The Type 212CD was chosen.

Poland (3)

Polish Navy — The ships were offered under the Orka program. Ultimately, the Polish Navy selected the Blekinge-class

== See also ==
- List of active Republic of Korea Navy ships
- List of submarine classes in service

Equivalent submarines of the same era

- Orka class
- Taigei class - first class to use ion-lithium batteries
- Project-75
