= CPSP =

CPSP may refer to:

- College of Physicians and Surgeons Pakistan
- Colegio de la Preciosa Sangre de Pichilemu
- Public Security Police Force of Macau, Portuguese abbreviation of Corpo de Policia de Segurança Pública de Macau
- Canadian Patrol Submarine Project
- Canadian Paediatric Surveillance Program
