= KSS-3 =

KSS-3 may stand for:

- Korean Attack Submarine program, third phase of a project to build up the ROK Navy's submarine forces.
- Dosan Ahn Changho-class submarine, submarine design chosen under the third phase (KSS-3) of the Korean Attack Submarine program.
