= Joint Strike Missile =

Norwegian/American air-launched cruise missile

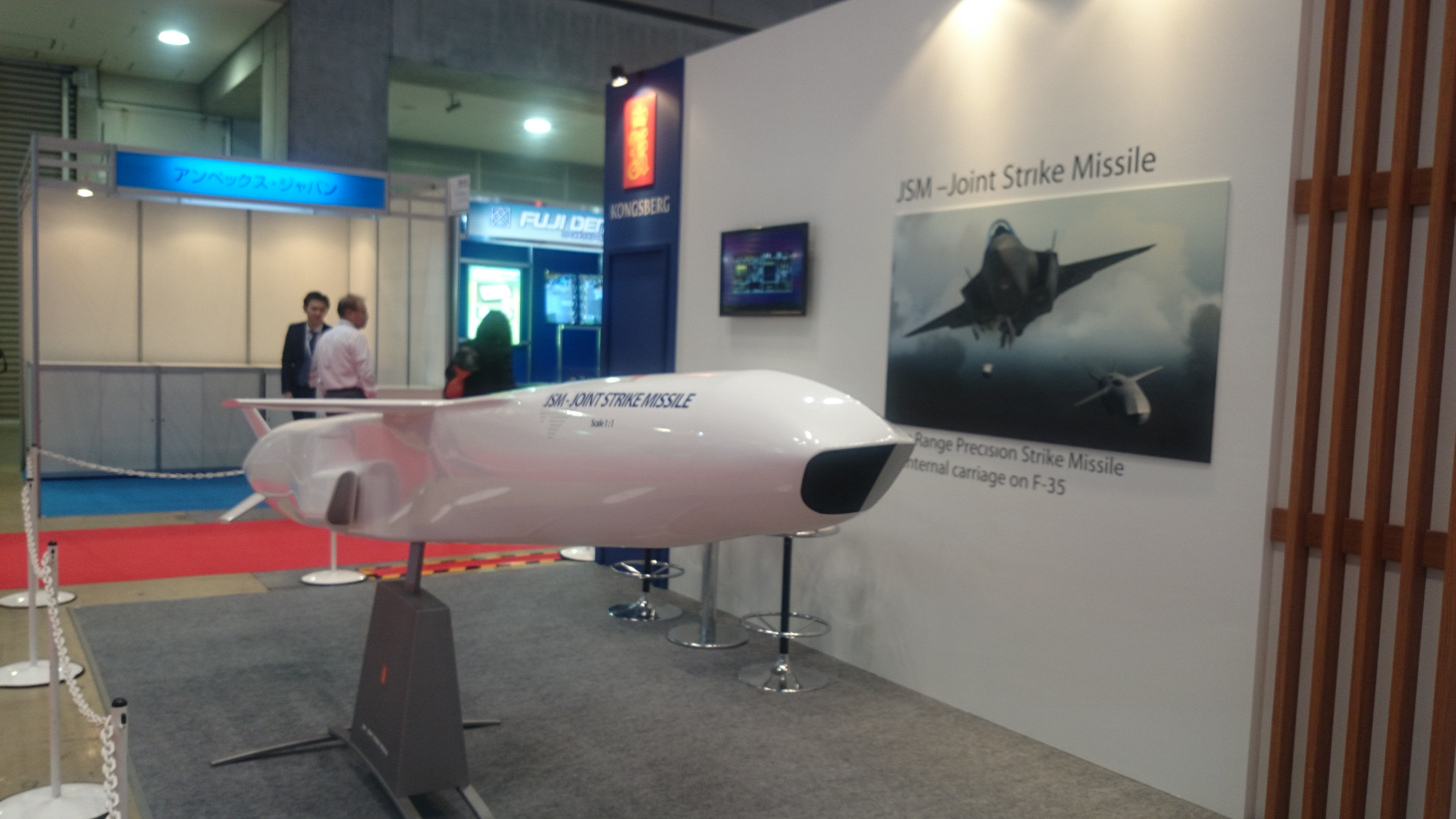
- Type: Air-launched anti-ship and land-attack cruise missile
- Place of origin: Norway; United States

Production history
- Designer: Kongsberg Defence & Aerospace; Raytheon Missiles & Defense
- Designed: From 2008 until mid-2018
- Manufacturer: Kongsberg Defence & Aerospace; Raytheon Missiles & Defense
- Developed from: Naval Strike Missile
- Produced: 2021

Specifications
- Mass: 416 kg (917 lb)
- Length: 4.00 m (13 ft 1 in)
- Width: 480 mm (1 ft 7 in) stowed
- Height: 520 mm (1 ft 8 in)
- Warhead: Blast-fragmentation
- Warhead weight: 120 kg (260 lb)
- Detonation mechanism: Time delay, impact
- Blast yield: 100 kg (220 lb) TNT equivalent
- Engine: Williams International F‐415 small turbofan
- Operational range: 555 km (345 mi; 300 nmi) hi‐hi‐lo; >350 km (220 mi; 190 nmi); 185 km (115 mi; 100 nmi) lo‐lo‐lo
- Maximum speed: Mach 0.9 (310 m/s; 1,000 ft/s) estimated
- Guidance system: GPS, INS, TERCOM, Imaging Infrared (IIR) capable of Autonomous Target Recognition (ATR), Passive RF homing capabilities for attacking radar-emitting threats, Two-way datalink
- Accuracy: CEP 1 m (3 ft 3 in)
- Launch platform: Fighters: F-15E, F-16, F/A-18E/F, F-35A and F-35C (internally) Planned: Fighters: Eurofighter Typhoon; Drones: GA-ASI MQ-9B SkyGuardian; Submarines: Type 212CD class, S-80 Plus class, Orka class
- References: Janes

The Joint Strike Missile (JSM; U.S designation AGM-184A Kraken) is a multi-role, air-launched cruise missile under development by the Norwegian company Kongsberg Defence & Aerospace and American company Raytheon Missiles & Defense. The JSM is derived from the Naval Strike Missile.

== Development ==
A development of the Naval Strike Missile (NSM), the Joint Strike Missile (JSM) will feature an option for ground strike and a two-way communications line, so that the missile can communicate with the central control room or other missiles in the air. This missile will be integrated with the Lockheed Martin F-35 Lightning II. Studies have shown that the F-35 would be able to carry two of these in its internal bays, while four additional missiles could be carried externally.

Lockheed Martin and Kongsberg signed a joint-marketing agreement for this air-launched version of the NSM, as well as an agreement committing both parties to integrating the JSM on the F-35 platform. The project is funded by Norway and Australia. Kongsberg signed a contract for the first phase of development of the JSM in April, 2009, which is scheduled for completion within 18 months. The JSM will have multicore computers running the Integrity real-time operating system from Green Hills Software.

Compared with the Naval Strike Missile, the Joint Strike Missile features:

- A larger warhead
- Form factor altered to allow the missile to fit into the F-35's internal bays
- The ability to attack sea and land targets
- Compatibility with various aircraft as launch platforms
- Improved range: estimates include 150 nmi (170 mi; 280 km) to more than 100 nmi low-low or more than 300 nmi (350 mi; 560 km) hi-low flight profiles

In November 2015, an F-16 Fighting Falcon successfully completed live-fire testing of the JSM at the Utah Test and Training Range.

The integration of the JSM with the F-35, and testing in the United States is facilitated by Lone Star Analysis, under long term contract with the Norwegian Ministry of Defense.

On 22 August 2024, Australia's Minister for Defence Industry and Capability Delivery, the Hon. Pat Conroy MP, announced a AU$850 million partnership agreement had been signed with Kongsberg's local subsidiary — Kongsberg Defence Australia — for the manufacture and servicing of the JSM (and NSM) for the Australian Defence Force (ADF) at a new purpose built factory. The factory is to be constructed at RAAF Base Williamtown near the city of Newcastle in New South Wales. Manufacturing of missiles is expected to commence from 2027.

=== Other variants ===
==== Proposed variants ====
JSM-SL: After the development of a torpedo tube launched version of the Naval Strike Missile (NSM-SL) was canceled in 2021, The Netherlands and Spain started considering a joint procurement of a torpedo tube launched version of the JSM instead. The project was disclosed to the Dutch parliament in 2025.

==== Canceled variants ====
VL-JSM: Kongsberg were studying methods to deploy the JSM from Norway's submarines, and found shaping the missile to fit into the F-35's confined bomb-bay also enabled it to fit in the Mark 41 Vertical Launching System. A VL-JSM could also compete with the Lockheed LRASM for the U.S. Navy's OASuW Increment 2 for a ship-launched anti-ship missile. On 15 July 2014, Kongsberg and Raytheon announced that they had formed a teaming agreement to offer the JSM to the United States Navy for their Offensive Anti-Surface Warfare (OASuW) requirement; a teaming agreement is an interim agreement between partners which commits them to their roles during the development and marketing stage of a project. It would generally be transformed into a formal sub-contracting agreement once an order for delivery has been placed. Raytheon would produce JSMs for the American market.

Ultimately the program, then known as Hypersonic Air Launched Offensive Anti-Surface, was cancelled during 2024.

== Production ==
The serial production began in 2021.

=== Production facilities ===
==== Norway - Kongsberg ====
The main production facility for the JSM is located in Norway.

==== Australia - Kongsberg ====
Prior to the formal order of the JSM by the Royal Australian Air Force in September 2024, Kongsberg announced in August 2024 that it was building a facility where the missile would be manufactured, in collaboration with the Australian government.

In April 2025, construction started on the JSM and NSM factory in the Newcastle Airport Precinct (co-located with RAAF Base Williamtown), and will be the first outside of Norway to build and maintain both types of missile.

==== United States - Kongsberg ====
In September 2024, Kongsberg Defence and Aerospace announced that it was building a new missile production facility in James City County in Virginia. The plan is to have a facility that will assemble, upgrade and repair the JSM and NSM. The investment will amount to USD100 million, and Kongsberg plans to hire 180 people.

=== Suppliers ===
==== United States ====
- Raytheon manufactures some of the components of the JSM.
- Williams International supplies the F‐415 turbofan.

== Operators ==
=== Current operators ===
Japan
The Japan Air Self-Defence Force chose the JSM as ASuW weapon for the F-35A as it can be carried internally.
- March 2019, contract awarded to supply the JSM starting in April 2021.
- November 2019, follow-on order valued at NOK 450 million (US$49 million).
- December 2020, follow-on order valued at NOK 820 million.
- November 2024, 4th order valued at NOK 1.9 billion.
- December 2025, follow-on order valued at NOK 800 million.
The first delivery took place in March 2026, but the F-35A operated by Japan still require software modifications to be in active service.
Norway
The Royal Norwegian Air Force ordered the JSM in October 2021 for their fleet of F-35 fighters. The initial delivery was expected for 2023.
The JSM entered service with the Norwegian Air Force in April 2025.

=== Future operators ===
Australia
Orders of Australia:
- September 2024, contract valued at NOK 1 billion.
Belgium
In April 2025, Belgian Minister of Defence Theo Francken announced Belgium would purchase JSM missiles for the F-35 jets in 2025.
In July 2025, the purchase of the JSM was confirmed as part of the "Ammunition Readiness Plan 2025".
Canada
In June 2026, Kongsberg Defence & Aerospace signed a contract worth NOK 4.7 billion was signed for a new (unknown) customer. Canada announced that it was the client of the missiles at the Ankara NATO summit in July 2026. The deal for the Royal Canadian Air Force is worth CAD $800,000,000.
Germany
The German government announced to purchase the JSM in June 2025 for the German Air Force.
- At the end of June 2025, the German and Norwegian defence ministers signed an agreement for a value of €478.7 million. The first delivery is expected before the end of 2027.
- A complementary purchase was approved in December 2025, the contract worth €300 million was signed in May 2026.
United States
The Department of Defense selected the JSM for the United States Air Force.
- March 2023, plan to procure 268 JSM over five years:
  - FY2024, 48 missiles ordered for a value of US$141 million, to be produced in Norway.
  - FY2025, 50 missiles ordered for a value of US$165.9 million.
  - FY2026, missiles ordered for a value of US$240.9 million.
Denmark
In October 2026, Denmark announced its decision to acquire JSM for its Royal Danish Air Force F-35A fighter aircraft. The contract's scope and value remain subject to negotiations.

=== Potential operators ===
Finland
In December 2021, the Finnish Air Force selected F-35 as their future fighter jet, and have selected JSM among other weaponry. As of 2024, no firm order has been confirmed.
Italy
In July 2024, the Italian parliament revealed that it would equip the 20 F-35B of the Italian Navy with the JSM missile and the MBDA SPEAR 3. These aircraft can be operated from the two aircraft carriers of the Italian Navy.
Netherlands
In June 2025, the Dutch government showed interest in equipping the future Orka-class submarine with the JSM missile.

== See also ==
- AGM-158C LRASM – (United States)
- Exocet – (France)
- Harpoon – (United States)
- KALCM Cheonryong – (South Korea)
- Sea Eagle – (United Kingdom)
- Sea Killer – (Italy)
- SOM (missile) – (Turkey)
