= KSS-2 =

KSS-2 may stand for:

- Korean Attack Submarine program, second phase of a project to build up the ROK Navy's submarine forces.
- Type 214 submarine (Son Won-il class), submarine design chosen under the second phase (KSS-2) of the Korean Attack Submarine program.
- Kerbal Star Systems 2, a mod for Kerbal Space Program.
