= KSS-1 =

KSS-1 may stand for:

- Korean Attack Submarine program, first phase of a project to build up the ROK Navy's submarine forces.
- Type 209 submarine (Chang Bogo class), submarine design chosen under the first phase (KSS-1) of the Korean Attack Submarine program.
