= Upholder/Victoria-class submarine =

Class of diesel-electric attack submarine

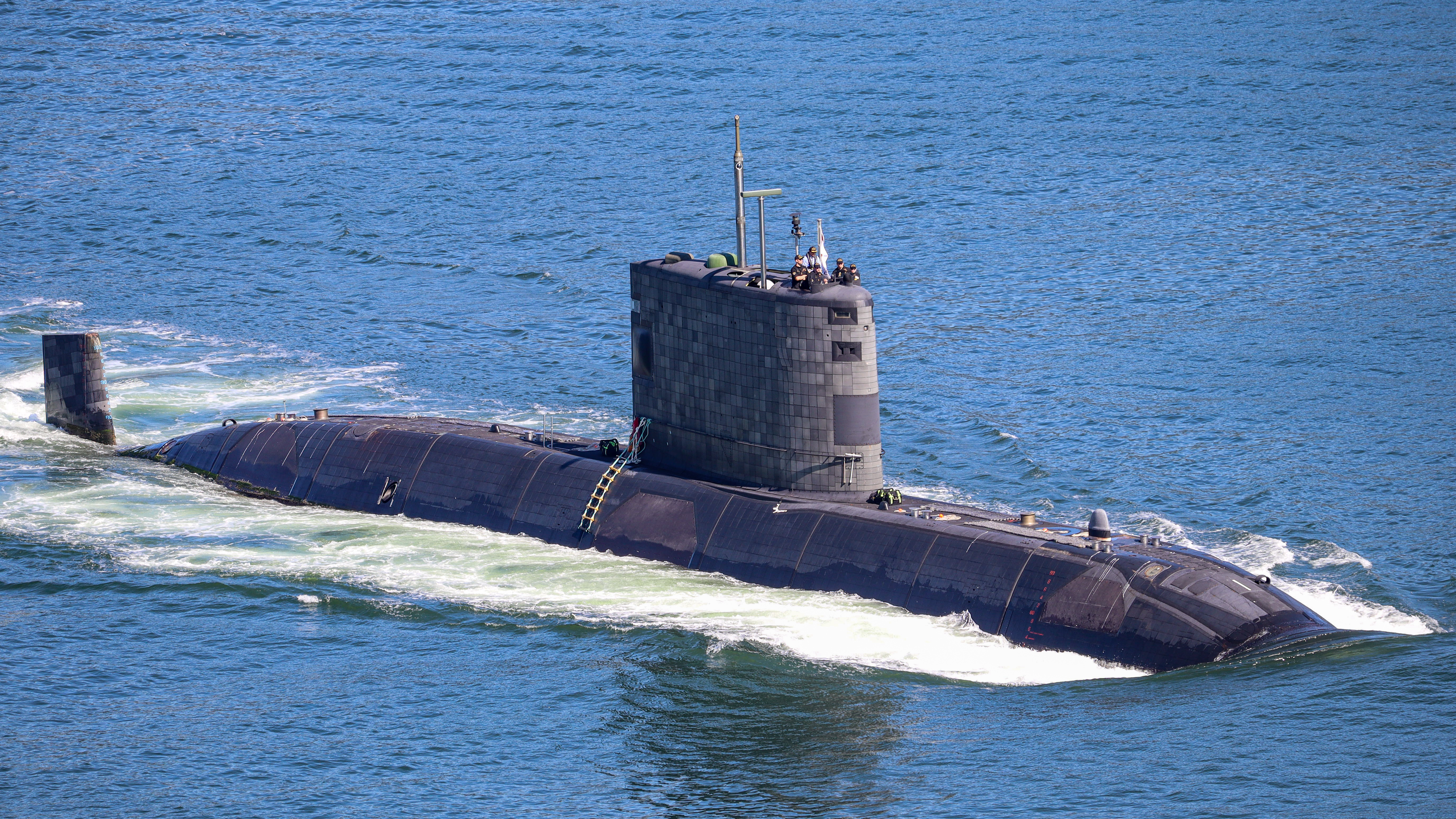
- HMCS Corner Brook in 2025

Class overview
- Name: Upholder class (UK); Victoria class (Canada)
- Builders: VSEL, Ltd and Cammell Laird Co.
- Operators: Royal Navy; Royal Canadian Navy
- Preceded by: Oberon class
- Succeeded by: Type 212CD
- In commission: RN: 2 June 1990 – October 1994; CFMC/RCN: December 2000 – present
- Planned: 12
- Completed: 4
- Canceled: 8
- Active: 4

General characteristics
- Type: Diesel-electric submarine (Hunter Killer SSK)
- Displacement: 2,455 t (2,416 long tons)
- Length: 70.26 m (230 ft 6 in)
- Beam: 7.2 m (23 ft 7 in)
- Draught: 7.6 m (24 ft 11 in)
- Propulsion: Diesel-electric – 1 shaft; 2 × Paxman Valenta 2,035 hp (1.517 MW) 1600 RPA SZ diesels; 1 × GEC electric motor (5 MW)
- Speed: 12 knots (22 km/h; 14 mph) (surface); 20 knots (37 km/h; 23 mph)+ (submerged)
- Range: 8,000 nmi (15,000 km; 9,200 mi) at 8 kn (15 km/h; 9.2 mph); 10,000 nmi (19,000 km; 12,000 mi) at snorkelling depth
- Endurance: 30 days
- Test depth: Over 656.17 ft (200 m)
- Complement: 59
- Sensors & processing systems: Lockheed Martin CCS 876 combat system; Submarine-Launched Expendable Bathythermograph (SSXBT): Lockheed Martin Mk-8 Bathythermograph; Periscope: Thales Group CK-35/CH-85; Sonar: Lockheed Martin AN/BQQ-10(v)7 Sonar System; Type 2040 active/passive bow multibeam echo sounder with Lockheed Martin Echo Sounder Interface; BQG-501 micropuffs; Type 2007 flank; Ultra Electronics Submarine Towed Array Sonar System (SubTASS); Type 2019 active intercept; Fire Control: Lockheed-Martin Librascope SFCS Mk 1 Mod C; Radar: Kelvin Hughes KH-1007
- Armament: 6 x 21 in (533 mm) torpedo tubes (18x Mark 48 Mod 7 AT torpedoes)

The Upholder/Victoria-class submarines, also known as the Type 2400 (due to their displacement of 2,400 tonnes), are a class of diesel-electric submarines built in the United Kingdom in the 1980s to supplement the nuclear submarines in the Submarine Service of the British Royal Navy.

The boats were originally named the Upholder class, after the most renowned vessel of the former U class. Their British service life was short, with the vessels being decommissioned in 1994. After an unsuccessful bid to transfer these submarines to the Pakistan Navy in 1993–1994, the Canadian government eventually purchased the submarines and a suite of trainers from the Royal Navy for Canadian Forces Maritime Command (renamed to Royal Canadian Navy in 2011) to replace their decommissioned Oberon-class submarines in 1998.

In Canadian service, the submarines are classified as the Victoria class. These submarines initially suffered from serious electrical problems and were beset by mechanical operational incidents that limited their active service and the scope of their deployments. These problems have largely been overcome and the subs have achieved full operational capability.

== Design and development ==
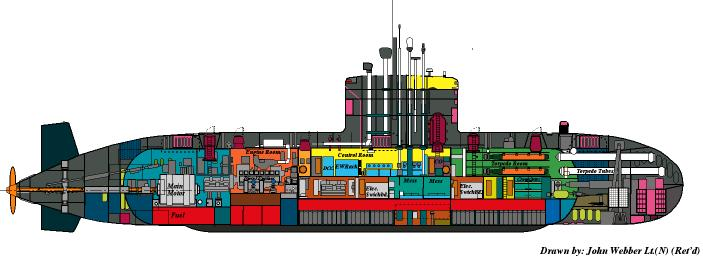
A cross-section of an Upholder-class submarine

In the late 1970s the United Kingdom Ministry of Defence (MoD) proposed a diesel-electric submarine design to replace the Oberon class. The new submarine class was intended to provide a more cost-effective alternative for training and in coastal defence. The announcement for the new design took place in September 1979. Five designs were put forward, with the MoD selecting the 1,960-ton design. However, the need for export potential upped the displacement limit to 2,400 tons to allow for flexibility in construction if the need for alternative machinery and systems arose.

The Vickers Shipbuilding & Engineering Ltd. (VSEL) Type 2400 diesel-electric patrol submarine design was selected. The design displaces between 2,168 and 2,220 tons surfaced and 2,400–2,455 tons submerged. The submarines are 230 feet 7 inches (70.28 m) long overall with a beam of 25 feet (7.6 m) and a draught of 17 feet 8 inches (5.38 m). (Note: Cocker has the vessels at 230 ft (70 m) long with a beam 25 feet (7.6 m) and a draught of 27 1/2 feet (8.4 m).) The submarines had a complement between 44 and 47 with the Royal Navy.

The submarines have a single-skinned, teardrop-shaped hull constructed from NQ1 high tensile steel. The hull is fitted with elastomeric acoustic tiles to reduce the submarine's acoustic signature. The class has a reported dive depth of over 650 feet (200 m).

=== Machinery ===
The submarines are powered by a single-shaft diesel-electric system. They are equipped with two Paxman Valenta 1600 RPS SZ diesel engines, each driving a 1.4-megawatt (1,900 hp) GEC electric alternator. There are two 120-cell Chloride batteries. The batteries have a 90-hour endurance at 3 knots (5.6 km/h; 3.5 mph). The submarine is propelled by a 4.028-megawatt (5,402 hp) GEC dual armature electric motor turning a seven-blade fixed pitch propeller. This gives the vessels a maximum speed of 12 knots (22 km/h; 14 mph) on the surface and 20 knots (37 km/h; 23 mph) submerged. They have a diesel fuel capacity of 200 tons, giving a range of 8,000 nautical miles (15,000 km; 9,200 mi) at 8 knots (15 km/h; 9.2 mph) and 10,000 nautical miles (19,000 km; 12,000 mi) at snorkling depth.

=== Armament ===
The class is equipped with six 21-inch (533 mm) torpedo tubes in the bow. In British service, the submarines were supplied with up to 18 Marconi Mk 24 Tigerfish Mod 2 torpedoes; they were also capable of using UGM-84 Sub-Harpoon missiles. They could also be adapted for use as a minelayer. The DCC Action Information Organisation and Fire Control System (AIS/FC), developed from the DCA/DCB systems in service at that time aboard Royal Navy nuclear-powered submarines, was based on two Ferranti FM1600E computers with a digital data bus linked to three dual-purpose consoles. Up to 35 targets could be tracked, and automatic guidance could be provided for four torpedoes against four separate targets.

During the refit for Canadian service, the Sub-Harpoon and mine capabilities were removed and the submarines were equipped with the Lockheed Martin Librascope Submarine fire-control system (SFCS) to meet the operational requirements of the Canadian Navy. Components from the fire control system of the Oberon-class submarines were installed. This gave the submarines the ability to fire the Gould Mk 48 Mod 4 torpedo. This torpedo, operating at 40 knots (74 km/h), is deployed against targets over a range of 50 kilometres (31 mi). The torpedo range is 38 kilometres (24 mi) at speeds up to 55 knots (102 km/h). The type uses active and passive homing to approach the designated target. In 2014, the Government of Canada purchased 12 upgrade kits that will allow the submarines to fire the Mk 48 Mod 7AT torpedo.

=== Sensors and countermeasures ===
As built, the Upholder class was equipped with the Kelvin Hughes Type 1007 I-band radar for navigational purposes. The submarines were fitted with the Type 2040 Thompson Sintra ARGONAUTE hull mounted sonar, installed in the bow and Type 2026 GEC Avionics passive towed array. The submarines had the Type 2019 Thompson Sintra PARIS passive sonar for active and intercept purposes. They also had the Type 2041 passive ranging sonar and the Type 2004 expendable bathythermograph. The class was fitted with Type 2008 underwater telephone. The Type 2040 sonar was intended to be upgraded to Type 2075; however, that upgrade was cancelled in 1991.

These systems were later upgraded with the installation of the BAE Type 2007 array and the Type 2046 towed array. The Canadian Towed Array Sonar (CANTASS) has been integrated into the towed sonar suite.

The Upholder-class submarines were equipped with the CK035 electro-optical search periscope and the CH085 optronic attack periscope, originally supplied by Pilkington Optronics. After the Canadian refit, the submarines were equipped with Canadian communication equipment and electronic support measures (ESM). This included two SSE decoy launchers and the AR 900 ESM.

== Construction and Royal Navy service ==
The plan initially called for twelve submarines to be built. However, formal approval was given in 1981 for the construction of only nine. The nine submarines were to be constructed in three stages, with Stage 1 being the construction of the prototype submarine, Stage 2 being the construction of three more follow-ons, and Stage 3 being the construction of five vessels with updated systems.

The MoD placed the order with VSEL for the Stage 1 submarine on 2 November 1983. Upholder's keel was laid down at the VSEL shipyard at Barrow-in-Furness that month and the submarine was launched on 2 December 1986. The order for Stage 2 was placed on 2 January 1986 with the contract for the next three vessels going to Cammell Laird, a subsidiary of VSEL. The cost announced for the program was £620 million plus long-lead items.

The second submarine, Unseen, was laid down at the Cammell Laird shipyard at Birkenhead on 12 August 1987 and launched on 14 November 1989. Ursula was laid down on 25 August 1987 and launched on 22 February 1991 and Unicorn was laid down on 13 March 1989 and launched on 16 April 1992.

Upholder was completed on 9 June 1990, followed by Unseen on 20 July 1991, Ursula on 8 May 1992 and Unicorn on 25 June 1993. Initially they were unable to fire torpedoes and the first three were refitted in 1992 and 1993 to have this fixed at a cost of £9 million. They were operating from HMS Dolphin (at Gosport), but with only four submarines the base was deemed uneconomic and they transferred to Devonport Naval Base. In their short period of service, the class operated mostly in the Atlantic Ocean, the Mediterranean and UK waters. The exception was Unicorn, which completed a 6-month deployment east of Suez, completing operations and exercises in the Mediterranean, the Gulf of Oman and Indian Ocean and in the Persian Gulf.

In 1992, the Defence Review announced the decision by the MoD to direct all further submarine expenditure to nuclear-powered submarines. In 1994, the Royal Navy abandoned the Type 2400 program after the first four submarines and Stage 3 was never ordered. The Upholder class were declared surplus in 1994 and laid up. Unseen was paid off on 6 April 1994, followed by Upholder on 29 April and Ursula on 16 June. These three submarines were laid up in June 1994. Unicorn was paid off on 16 October 1994 and laid up.

== Search for a buyer ==
=== Failed sale to Pakistan ===
In 1992, the United Kingdom learned that Pakistan had been in negotiations with France over the acquisition of submarines. The Sharif administration gave permission to the Pakistan Navy to acquire either diesel-electric powered or air-independent powered submarines. The Pakistan Navy's research team, comprising three admirals, visited Sweden, China, France, and the United Kingdom. Original plans were to acquire the submarines from Sweden but later the acquisition of either the British Upholders or the French Agosta class was recommended. During this time, Admiral Saeed Khan, the Chief of Naval Staff (CNS), had strongly suggested Upholder class vessels, but the Bhutto administration chose French technology for several political and technical reasons.

=== Sale to Canada ===
Following the cancellation of the Canadian nuclear-powered submarine program, the Canadian navy sought to acquire conventionally-powered submarines again. The Canadian National Defence White Paper of 1994 stated the intent to explore the purchase of the Upholder class from the UK. The choice faced opposition and the price of $1 billion that the MoD demanded stalled the decision by the Cabinet of Canada to go ahead with the purchase. In the meantime, the subs were offered to Portugal and Chile. In 1996, another attempt to purchase the subs by Canada was stopped soon after starting. In the meantime, the UK spent millions maintaining the submarines.

In April 1998, the Canadian government announced the potential acquisition of the Upholder class. The published cost was $750 million divided into two parts. $610 million was to be paid for the subs themselves and the remaining $140 million would cover related expenses.

On 3 July 1998, the deal was ratified and two contracts were signed simultaneously. The first was an eight-year interest-free lease-to-purchase agreement for the four submarines, five training simulators and assorted training and data packages. The lease payments were part of a barter agreement for the continued access by the UK to Canadian Forces bases Wainwright, Suffield, and Goose Bay. The second contract was with VSEL for the refits required for the reactivation of the laid-up submarines. This included modifications for Canadian service, new batteries, a training program and all spare parts.

Although the Canadian government touted the $750 million CAD procurement as a bargain, there have been arguments over the quality of the submarines with some suggestions that the purchase price will be at least spent again putting things right. Some Canadian opposition parties demanded that the British government fund any further costs, since it is widely believed that the submarines deteriorated while in storage and the Royal Navy was not completely forthcoming on their condition during the sale. However, Stephen Saunders, editor of Jane's Fighting Ships, argued that "there is not something inherently wrong with the class of submarines."

In 2008, Babcock Canada was awarded the contract to support the Victoria class in Canadian service in the period up to 2023. The potential value of the contract was over CAD $3.6 billion and required establishing a supply chain in Canada to support and sustain the submarines. Every six to nine years each Victoria-class boat undergoes an extended docking work period (EDWP) involving comprehensive maintenance, repair, overhaul or upgrading of over 200 systems including sonar upgrades, mast upgrades and combat system upgrades.

==== Trainers ====
Victoria-class submarines use eight Submarine Command Team Trainers built for the Royal Navy. These were moved from the UK to Canada by CAE, Computing Devices Canada, General Dynamics Canada and Irving Shipbuilding. These devices are land-based systems using simulators and other training devices. Victoria-class submarines also use a Canadian Submarine Escape Trainer, attached to a real submarine escape hatch to simulate escape procedures.

== Canadian service ==
Upon acquiring the subs, Maritime Command suggested that the subs would be operational by 2000. This included an 18-month systems check. Each sub would undergo a six-month Canadian Work Period (CWP). During the CWP, Canadian communications and fire control systems were installed. On 6 October, Unseen was accepted by Canada at Barrow-in-Furness and renamed Victoria. The submarine arrived in Canada on 23 October 2000 and was commissioned into Maritime Command on 2 December. She then underwent her CWP.

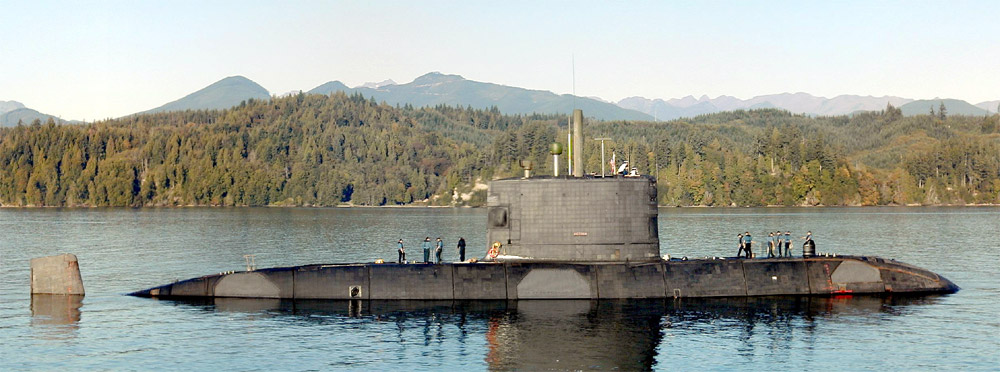
HMCS Victoria at Naval Base Kitsap in October 2004, several years after her acquisition by the Royal Canadian Navy

Unicorn was accepted by Canada and renamed Windsor on 5 July 2001. The sub sailed from Faslane on 8 October, arriving at Halifax, Nova Scotia on 19 October 2001. During her sea trials, Windsor suffered minor flooding while submerged, forcing her early entry into the CWP. Ursula was accepted by Canada and renamed Corner Brook on 21 February 2003. She departed Faslane on 25 February and arrived at Halifax on 10 March. Corner Brook was commissioned at her namesake city on 29 June 2003. On 29 June 2003, following the completion of her CWP, Victoria transferred to the west coast, arriving at Esquimalt, British Columbia on 24 August. Windsor was commissioned into Maritime Command during her CWP on 4 October 2003.

The crew of Onondaga, the last Canadian Oberon, transferred to Upholder, the last of the class to transfer in July 2000. The sub was accepted by Canada on 2 October 2004 at Faslane and renamed Chicoutimi.

=== Chicoutimi fire ===
Chicoutimi cleared Faslane on 4 October 2004 on her homeward journey to Canada. Since Faslane was a nuclear submarine base, Chicoutimi was forced to travel on the surface for the first stage of the passage. On 5 October Chicoutimi was passing through a gale with 6-metre (20 ft) seas. During a watch change at 03:00 sea water entered the conning tower. The lower hatch prevented the water from entering the sub; however, the drain in the tower failed to operate. When the lower hatch was opened, the water fell into the sub and was then pumped overboard with the incident noted. The drain valves required much repair before diving. At 10:52 two crew entered the tower to perform the needed repairs. The upper hatch was opened during the repair and after roughly 25 minutes, another tool was needed from within the sub. Once the lower hatch was opened, the submarine was hit by a large wave thereby throwing roughly 500 imperial gallons (2,300 L) of sea water into Chicoutimi. Electrical explosions and fire erupted soon afterward which spread quickly. In order to fight the fire, all systems aboard the submarine were shut down, leaving the submarine dead in the water. An attempt to restore auxiliary power caused another fire to break out. At 19:12, attempts to remove smoke by starting an oxygen generator caused another fire. Nine sailors were injured, three seriously.

The first ship on the scene was the Irish patrol vessel LÉ Róisín, which suffered damage in the heavy seas and was forced to return to port. The British frigate HMS Montrose arrived the following day to provide aid. Rescue efforts had been hampered by the poor weather. The three seriously injured crewmen were evacuated by Montrose's helicopter and flown directly to Sligo, Ireland. One sailor died of his injuries shortly after arrival. Chicoutimi was taken in tow on 7 October and arrived back at Faslane on 9 October.

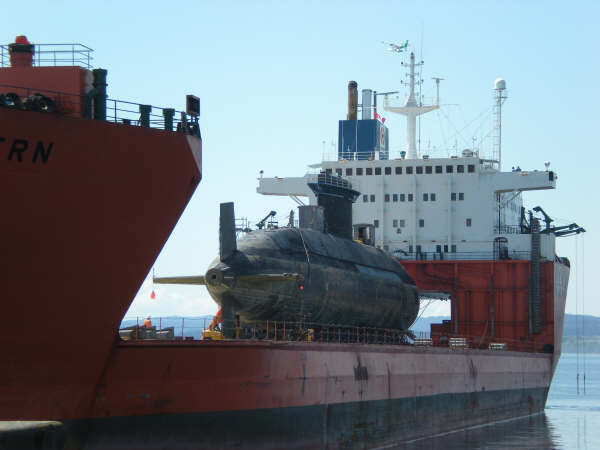
HMCS Chicoutimi aboard the heavy-lift ship Tern, April 2009

Chicoutimi was transported to Halifax aboard the submersible heavy-lift vessel Eide Transporter, arriving on 1 February 2005. The commissioning of the submarine was delayed until the assessment of the damage could take place. Following the assessment, Chicoutimi was carried to Esquimalt aboard the submersible heavy-lift ship Tern, arriving on 29 April 2009 to undergo a major refit.

=== Service entry ===
Windsor became the first active member of the class in Canadian service in June 2005. In the following year and a half, the submarine took part in several international naval exercises and training periods with other Canadian units. Victoria performed several sea trials and training exercises before beginning a major refit, called the Extended Docking Work Period (EDWP), on 27 June 2005. Corner Brook entered her CWP from 2004 to 2005 and began sea trials on 24 October 2006.

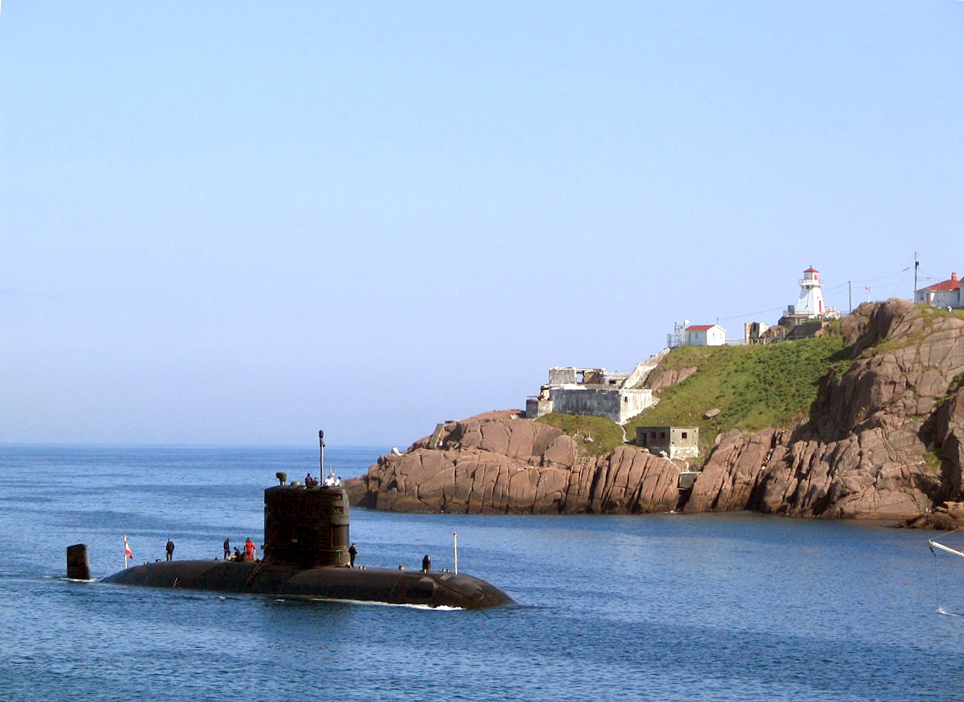
HMCS Corner Brook passing Fort Amherst and entering St. John's Harbour, c. 2006

On 15 January 2007, Windsor began the EDWP refit at Halifax. In 2007 Corner Brook participated in the NATO naval exercise "Joint Warrior", marking the first time in fifteen years that a Canadian submarine had sailed in European waters. In August 2007, Corner Brook participated in Operation Nanook, Canada's naval exercise in the Arctic.

In March 2008, Corner Brook deployed as part of Operation Caribbe in the Caribbean Sea. In August 2009 Corner Brook again deployed to the Arctic as part of Operation Nanook.

On 30 January 2011 Corner Brook left Halifax to transfer to the west coast. On the way, the submarine participated in Operation Caribbe. She arrived at Esquimalt on 5 May 2011. On 4 June 2011, Corner Brook while diving off the coast of British Columbia slammed into the seafloor at 5.9 knots (11 km/h) at a depth of 45 metres (148 ft). Two sailors were injured in the collision and the submarine suffered significant damage, with a 2-metre (6 ft 7 in) hole in the bow. Two torpedo tube doors were torn off in the collision. The submarine surfaced and made port without requiring aid. The commander of the submarine was later stripped of his command following a board of inquiry. Repairs and a major refit kept the sub out of operational service until 2018. Victoria emerged from the EDWP at the end of 2011.

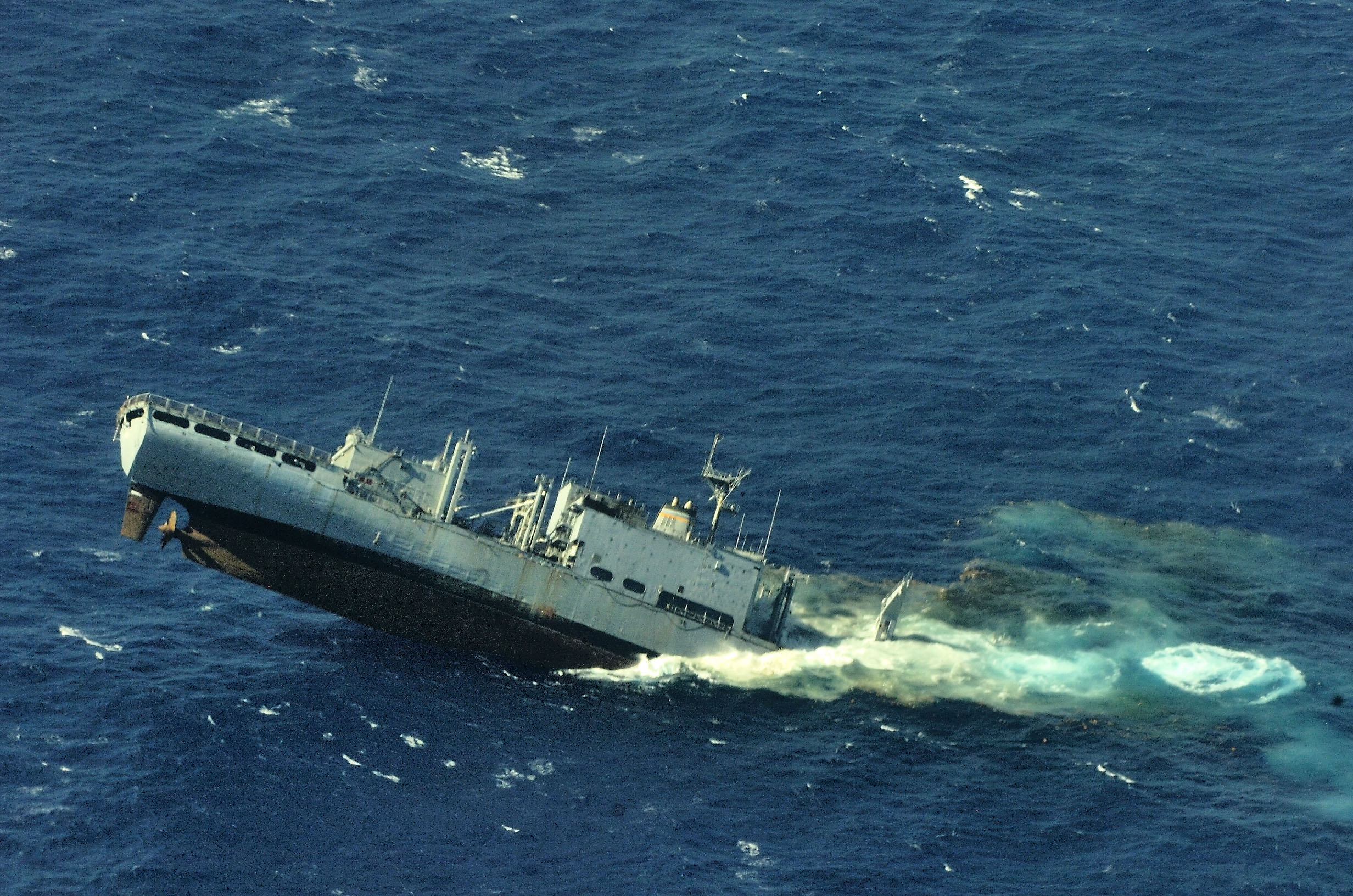
ex-Concord sinks in the Pacific Ocean after being used as a target vessel by HMCS Victoria during RIMPAC naval exercise, July 2012

Victoria was declared fully operational in March 2012 and participated in the RIMPAC naval exercise that year, sinking ex-Concord with one of her torpedoes. Windsor finished her refit on 30 November 2012. Victoria participated in Operation Caribbe in 2013. Windsor reentered the dockyard in March 2014 requiring the replacement of a defective diesel generator.

Windsor performed a 105-day training cruise in 2015, making it the longest deployment by a Victoria-class submarine. The submarine participated in training exercises with NATO and several navies in the North Atlantic. During the cruise, Windsor was deployed to track five submarines from another nation that had entered the North Atlantic. Canada announced plans for a major life extension for the class on 7 April 2015, possibly to start in 2020. The estimated cost for the program would be between $1.5 and $2 billion CAN.

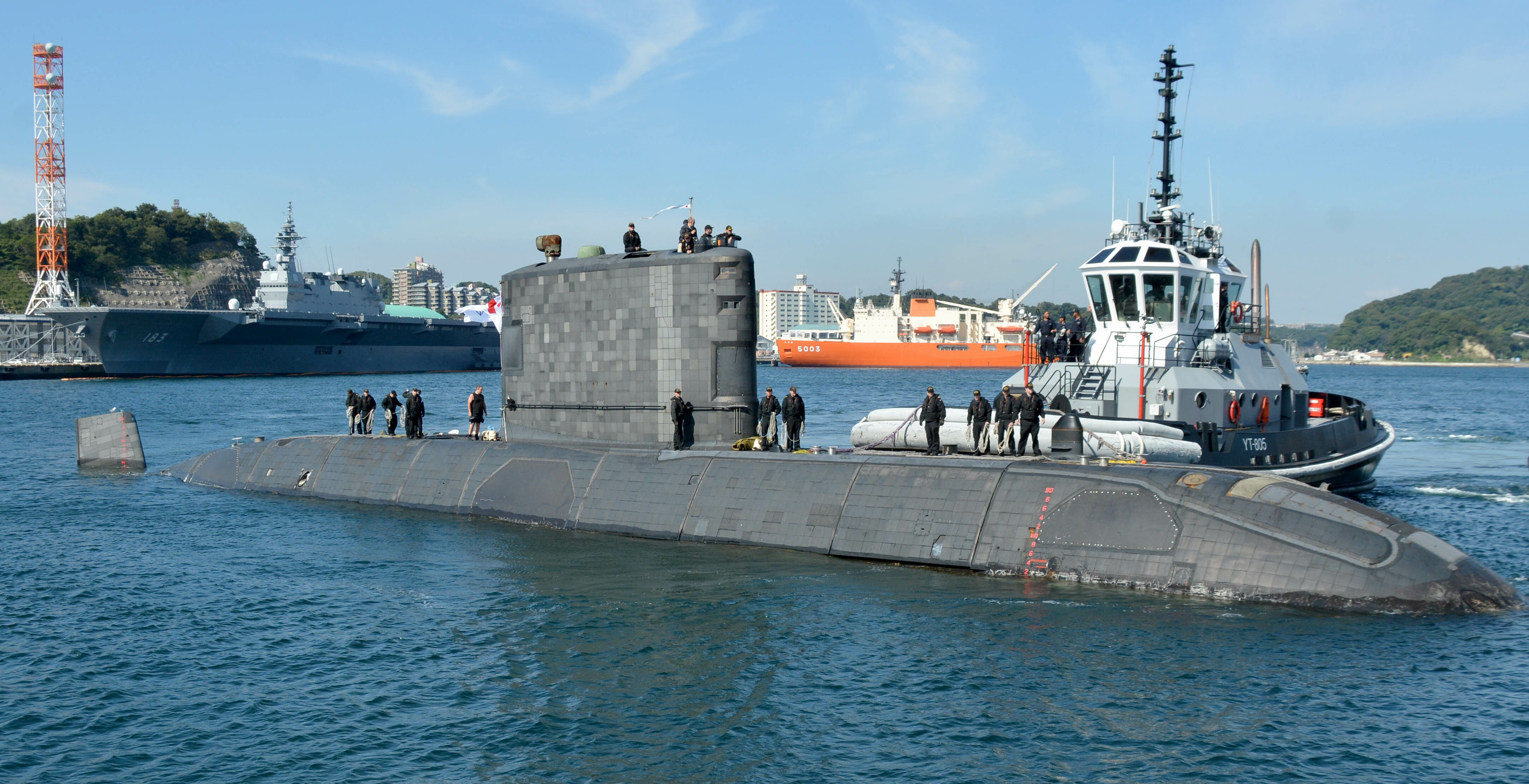
HMCS Chicoutimi being assisted by a tugboat after her arrival at United States Fleet Activities Yokosuka, October 2017

On 3 September 2015, Chicoutimi was commissioned into the Royal Canadian Navy at Esquimalt. However, the sub was restricted to shallow-water diving. In October 2015, Chicoutimi was among the Canadian vessels sent to participate in a joint exercise with the United States Navy. Chicoutimi and Victoria were taken out of active service in 2016 after hundreds of welds were found to not meet quality standards, affecting the ability of the subs to dive. They were docked at Esquimalt for several months. Chicoutimi was repaired first, followed by Victoria. Victoria was used for training purposes until repairs were effected. In September 2017, Canada deployed Chicoutimi on patrol in Asian waters, the first such deployment by a Victoria-class submarine. During the deployment, Chicoutimi marked the first visit to Japan by a Canadian submarine since 1968. The vessel returned to Canada on 21 March 2018 spending 197 days at sea, the longest deployment by a Victoria-class submarine in Canadian service.

=== Life extension and replacement ===
Under the Justin Trudeau government's defence policy paper, Strong Secure Engaged (2017), the operational life of each Victoria-class boat was to be extended by one additional "life-cycle" (or by about eight years). This was designed to permit the operation of the fleet into about the early to mid-2030s. As of 2020 no decision had been taken on the actual replacement of Canada's submarines, which were then already thirty years old. Analysis by the Naval Association of Canada indicated that the lead times, technical challenges and costs involved in submarine replacement would be significant if such a program was initiated.

According to John Ivison, RCN personnel assessed six submarines that could be a potential replacement. They consisted of the conventional Barracuda class, the Type 212CD, the Taigei class, the KSS-III class, the Isaac Peral class and the Blekinge class. On 10 July 2024, the Government of Canada announced the Canadian Patrol Submarine Project (CPSP). Up to 12 conventionally powered submarines are to be acquired for the RCN. An RFI was issued by Public Services and Procurement Canada (PSPC) in September 2024. On 21 November, it was reported that the Taigei class was no longer being considered. In August 2025, the government narrowed the choice down to the Type 212CD and the KSS-III.

On 6 July 2026, the government selected the Type 212CD as the new fleet of submarines. With an estimated procurement cost of $24 billion, the first four submarines are to be delivered to Canada by 2034; with lifetime maintenance and sustainment costs added, the overall program will likely hit $100 billion.

== Boats in class ==
Upholder/Victoria class construction data (Note: The construction dates of these submarines vary widely from source to source. Dates here are those provided by the Royal Canadian Navy unless otherwise stated.)
British name	Pennant no.	Builder	Laid down	Launched	British service		Canadian name	Hull no.	Canadian service	
British name	Pennant no.	Builder	Laid down	Launched	Commissioned	Paid off	Canadian name	Hull no.	Commissioned	Status
Upholder	S 40	VSEL, Barrow-in-Furness	November 1983	2 December 1986	9 June 1990	29 April 1994	Chicoutimi	SSK 879	3 September 2015	In active service
Unseen	S 41	Cammell Laird, Birkenhead	12 August 1987	14 November 1989	20 July 1991	6 April 1994	Victoria	SSK 876	2 December 2000	In active service
Ursula	S 42	Cammell Laird, Birkenhead	28 August 1987	22 February 1991	8 May 1992	16 June 1994	Corner Brook	SSK 878	29 June 2003	In active service
Unicorn	S 43	Cammell Laird, Birkenhead	13 March 1989	16 April 1992	25 June 1993	16 October 1994	Windsor	SSK 877	4 October 2003	In active service

== See also ==
- List of submarine classes in service
- Canada-class submarine, a 1987 proposal for a class of nuclear-powered attack submarines that was cancelled in 1989

=== Equivalent submarines of the same era ===
- Walrus class
- Collins class
- Project 636
- Hai Lung class
- Oyashio class

== Sources ==
- Cocker, Maurice (2008). Royal Navy Submarines: 1901 to the Present Day. Barnsley, UK: Pen and Sword Books Ltd. ISBN 978-1-84415-733-4.
- Gardiner, Robert; Chumbley, Stephen; Budzbon, Przemysław, eds. (1995). Conway's All the World's Fighting Ships 1947–1995. Annapolis, Maryland: Naval Institute Press. ISBN 1-55750-132-7.
- Macpherson, Ken; Barrie, Ron (2002). The Ships of Canada's Naval Forces 1910–2002 (Third ed.). St. Catharines, Ontario: Vanwell Publishing. ISBN 1-55125-072-1.
- Milner, Marc (2010). Canada's Navy: The First Century (Second ed.). Toronto: University of Toronto Press. ISBN 978-0-8020-9604-3.
- Perkins, J. David (2000). The Canadian Submarine Service in Review. St. Catharines, Ontario: Vanwell Publishing Limited. ISBN 1-55125-031-4.
- Saunders, Stephen, ed. (2004). Jane's Fighting Ships 2004–2005. Alexandria, Virginia: Jane's Information Group. ISBN 0-7106-2623-1.
