= Orka-class submarine =

Design project of the Royal Netherlands Navy

- Artist impression

Class overview
- Name: Orka class
- Builders: Naval Group
- Operators: Royal Netherlands Navy
- Preceded by: Walrus class
- Cost: €3.5 billion (2018) (equivalent to €4.11 billion in 2025) for 4 units; €4.64 billion (2020) (equivalent to €5.36 billion in 2025) for 4 units; €5.6 billion (2024) (equivalent to €5.65 billion in 2025) for 4 units
- Built: 2027 -
- In commission: 2034+
- Planned: 4

General characteristics
- Type: Diesel-electric attack submarine
- Displacement: 3,300 t (3,248 long tons) surfaced
- Length: 82 m (269 ft 0 in)
- Beam: 8.2 m (26 ft 11 in)
- Propulsion: Diesel-electric with lithium-ion batteries
- Range: 15,000 nmi (28,000 km; 17,000 mi)
- Crew: 35 to 43 (plus at least 16 additional berths)
- Sensors & processing systems: Systems: Thales multi-acoustic sensors surveillance; Sonars: Thales sonar suite: Flank array sonar; Towed array sonar; MOAS (mine & obstacle avoidance sonar); Cylindrical array sonar; Intercept cylindrical array; Echo sounder (navigation); Masts: Safran Series-30AOM / SOM attack and search optronics mast (equipped with integral RESM antennas); Safran Series 10 CSR mast with Sentinel-U radar; Safran SIGMA 40 XP gyrolaser navigation systems; Communications: Thales underwater communication systems
- Armament: 6 × 533 mm (21 in) torpedo tubes for: F21 Mk2 heavy torpedoes; Cruise missiles (TBD); Payload capacity: 30 torpedo-size weapons and UUV

The Orka-class submarine is a future submarine class currently planned for the Royal Netherlands Navy (RNLN). The submarines will replace the aging Walrus class. They will be the first submarines of the RNLN that are built at a foreign shipyard. As of 2024 they are planned to enter service in 2035. In March 2024, it was announced that the French Naval Group had won the tender for the class.

== History ==
=== Beginning of the replacement process ===
In 2013 the Royal Netherlands Navy (RNLN) started the preparation process for the replacement of the Walrus-class submarines. That same year the Dutch Minister of Defence had signed letters of intent with both Norway and Germany for the development of new submarines, while there had also been talks with Norway about a Future Submarine Co-Operation. Plans were announced by Dutch Minister of Defence, Jeanine Hennis-Plasschaert, in November 2014 to replace the Walrus-class submarines with four new submarines in 2025. Later that year it was announced that the Netherlands would continue cooperating with Norway on the procurement of new submarines, but cooperation with Germany would not continue as a result of difference in urgency. In 2015 a vision for the future of the Royal Netherlands Navy Submarine Service was sent by the Minister of Defence to the Tweede Kamer which underlined the need for new submarines and international cooperation. Meanwhile Dutch shipbuilder Damen had announced in January that it will work together with Saab to design and build submarines. Other companies, such as the French Naval Group and German ThyssenKrupp Marine Systems (TKMS), had also shown interest in building new submarines that could replace the Walrus-class. The A-letter, which officially starts the replacement program, was at first expected to be sent to the Tweede Kamer in 2015, and later in April 2016. While no letter was sent during this period, talks and discussions continued about what kind of submarines were needed, the amount and international cooperation. In June 2016 the A-letter was finally sent and revealed four requirements that the potentially new submarines would need to meet. At the same time it was also announced that in the next phase of the replacement program research needs to be done on how these requirements can be fulfilled. During this research four specific options will considered: expeditionary submarines, coastal submarines, submarine drones or other systems (and thus no submarines will be tendered).

=== Continued delays ===
By 2017, there was still no political agreement on the quantity or type of new submarines to be ordered; nor the tasks they were expected to perform. However, it seems certain that they will be replaced, since the alleged Russian threat was regarded as an incentive to invest in a new class. The Minister of Defence, however, delayed the replacement by two years, until 2027. Roughly, there are two groups in the Dutch parliament – one in favor of replacing the Walrus class by an equally capable class of large, expeditionary, diesel-electric submarine, and the other in favor of choosing a cheaper solution of smaller diesel-electrics, similar to Swedish and German submarines. It is unknown where the new boats will be built; since the Dutch RDM shipyard (the only Dutch yard capable of building submarines) is no longer in operation. The Defensienota (Defense policy for the coming years) of March 2018 revealed that the Dutch government is still planning to replace the Walrus-class submarines, with an allocated budget of more than 2.5 billion euros for the new submarines. Additional information on how to proceed with the replacement was expected at the end of 2018, when the Dutch Minister of Defence, Ank Bijleveld, was to send a so-called B-letter to the Dutch parliament. Minister Bijleveld also underlined in an interview that the new submarines should have the same niche capabilities as the current Walrus-class submarines: the ability to operate and gather intelligence in both shallow water close to the coast and in deep water in the ocean. In December 2019 the B-letter was sent to the Dutch parliament. The B-letter stated that the Dutch government wants to acquire four long range conventionally powered submarines that are versatile. In mid-2021 it was indicated that the revised plan was to take a decision on the replacement type in 2022 and to have the first vessel in service by 2028, with the first two boats to be in service by 2031. However, by October 2021 it was reported that this timeline was no longer feasible. Instead, the Dutch Ministry of Defence signalled that the envisaged dates would have to be "substantially adjusted", likely impacting the originally proposed in-service dates for the first submarines. In April 2022 it was announced that the revised schedule for construction of the new replacement boats would likely see the first two vessels entering service in the 2034 to 2037 timeframe. As a result the two oldest Walrus-class submarines will be decommissioned and used for spare parts to keep the two youngest boats longer in service. The goal is to keep two boats operational and prevent a capability gap.

On 16 November 2022 the next phase in the program was started when DMO delivered the request for quotation (RfQ) to the three remaining yards. The proposals had to be submitted before 28 July 2023 with a final decision being made by the navy in late 2023 or early 2024.

=== Contenders ===
The Ministry of Defence had shortlisted three bidders:

- Damen Group and Saab Group announced that they have partnered from 2015 to jointly develop, offer and build next-generation submarines that are able to replace the current Walrus-class submarines. It was announced on 1 June 2018 that their design will be derived from the A26 submarine. The proposed submarine is around 73 metres (239 ft 6 in) long with a beam of 8 metres (26 ft 3 in). Furthermore, the displacement will be around 2,900 tonnes (2,900 long tons), with a complement of 34 to 42 people. The boat's armament includes six torpedo tubes and one multi-mission lock which can be used to deploy special forces. On 28 July 2023 they submitted a submarine design for the Walrus class replacement program that is called C718. The offer includes knowledge transfer so that the Royal Netherlands Navy can perform maintenance and upgrade the submarines during their lifespan by themselves.
- Naval Group announced that it is offering its newest submarine class, the Barracuda class, as replacement for the Walrus class. A version of the "Shortfin" diesel-electric variant Barracuda class was offered, the Blacksword, rather than the nuclear variant used by the French Navy.
- ThyssenKrupp Marine Systems is (as of December 2019) planning to offer a Type 212CD submarine.

Spain's Navantia's S-80 was not accepted as a contender following the B-letter in 2019. In 2022 the Spanish Ministry of Defence sent a letter to the Dutch DMO for Navantia to be allowed to put in an offer following a RfQ sent to the remaining contenders, in which some of the requirements have changed. It is rumoured that the request was denied by DMO.

=== Winning bid ===
On 15 March 2024 State Secretary for Defence Christophe van der Maat officially announced that Naval Group had been selected as the winning bid. The first two submarines will be delivered within ten years after the contract has been signed. Prior to this announcement, the winner was already leaked to several media outlets, which caused political backlash for choosing a foreign yard over a Dutch one. In April 2024, it was announced which ten Dutch companies and two knowledge institutions will be involved in the construction of the Orka class submarines.

On 10 September 2024 the Netherlands and Naval Group signed an industrial cooperation agreement (ICA). This binding agreement ensures that Naval Group and the Dutch defense and maritime industries will collaborate on the Orka-class submarines. It will also result in orders for the Dutch industry that will have a total worth of approximately one billion euros. That same month, on 30 September 2024, the Delivery Agreement for the Replacement Netherlands Submarine Capability (RNSC) programme was also signed between the Dutch Ministry of Defence and Naval Group. The signing of this agreement marks the start of the replacement program.

=== Contracts ===
On 16 June 2025 Naval Group and Royal IHC signed a contract for the supply of key components for the Orka class submarines. As part of this contract Royal IHC will be responsible for the development and delivery of high-quality modules and steel structures for all four boats. The construction of these modules is expected to start in the second half of 2026. On 25 September 2025 Naval Group and RH Marine signed a contract as part of their collaboration on the Orka class submarines. Under the agreement RH Marine will contribute its expertise in power distribution, platform automation, and integrated system solutions. During the NIDV Exhibition Defence & Security (NEDS) in November 2025 both Nevesbu and Van Halteren Technologies (VHT) were contracted. VHT will provide for the submarines critical on-board systems, such as refrigeration and freezing systems, hydraulic power units, as well as capstans and anchor winches. Meanwhile Nevesbu will design complex subsystems.

On 16 June 2026 the Dutch Ministry of Defence and Naval Group signed a contract for the supply of F21 Mk2 heavyweight torpedoes to equip the future Orka-class submarines of the RNLN. As a result of this contract, the RNLN will become the first SSK fleet within NATO to operate the F21 torpedo.

On 15 September 2026 Royal IHC and Naval Group signed an initial contract covering the on-board accommodation module for the Orka class submarines.

== Design ==
=== Armament ===
The Orka class submarines are expected to be equipped with the submarine launched version of the Joint Strike Missile (JSM), the JSM-SL. Initially they were also to be equipped with the Mark 48 MOD 7AT torpedo. However, in March 2026 it was announced that the submarines will instead be equipped with the F21 Mk2 torpedo.

=== Sensors and processing systems ===
The submarines will be equipped with a Thales sonar suite, which will include bow, flank, and obstacle avoidance sonars, an underwater voice communication system, an intercept array, a passive towed-array sonar, and signal processing racks. The sensors in this sonar suite will be derived from the sensors that are installed in the systems equipping the French nuclear submarines of the Suffren-class. Meanwhile, the passive towed-array sonar will make use of OptiArray technology from the Dutch company Optics11.

== Boats ==
List of boats
No.	Name	Builder	Status	Contract	Steel cutting	Laid down	Launched	Comm.	Notes
Royal Netherlands Navy - 4 ordered
TBA	Orka	Naval Group, Cherbourg, France	Ordered	30 Sep 2024	-	-	-	2033	
TBA	Zwaardvis	Naval Group, Cherbourg, France	Ordered	30 Sep 2024	-	-	-	2035	
TBA	Barracuda	Naval Group, Cherbourg, France	Ordered	30 Sep 2024	-	-	-	2036	
TBA	Tijgerhaai	Naval Group, Cherbourg, France	Ordered	30 Sep 2024	-	-	-	2037	

Planned dates

The names of the new submarines were announced by State Secretary for Defence Van der Maat. The class will be known as the Orka class, with the subs named Orka (Orca), Zwaardvis (Swordfish), Barracuda (Barracuda) and Tijgerhaai (Tiger shark).

== See also ==
- List of submarines of the Netherlands
- Future of the Royal Netherlands Navy
- Attack-class submarine

Similar procurement projects

- Korean Attack Submarine program
- Canadian Patrol Submarine Project
- SSN-AUKUS
- Submarine-building Perspective Plan
