= Type 212CD submarine =

Norwegian and German submarine

Class overview
- Builders: TKMS, Kiel and Wismar
- Operators: Royal Norwegian Navy; German Navy; Royal Canadian Navy
- Preceded by: Ula class (Norway); Type 212A (Germany); Victoria class (Canada)
- Planned: Total: 24 to 27; Norway: 6; Germany: 6 to 9; Canada: 12
- On order: Total: 12; Germany: 6; Norway: 6
- Building: 2

General characteristics
- Type: Attack submarine
- Displacement: 2,500 t (2,500 long tons) surfaced, 2,800 t (2,800 long tons) submerged
- Length: 73 m (239 ft 6 in)
- Beam: 10 m (32 ft 10 in)
- Draught: 7 m (23 ft 0 in)
- Propulsion: Diesel-electric / AIP / battery; Diesel engines: 2 MTU 4000; New 4th gen AIP PEM fuel cells (HDW); Lithium battery
- Speed: > 20 knots (37 km/h; 23 mph)
- Endurance: 41 days
- Complement: 27-30
- Sensors & processing systems: Combat system: ORCCA supplied by kta naval systems (consortium TKMS, Atlas Elektronik, Kongsberg); Sonars: Combat sonar suite: not defined yet; Mine avoidance and navigation: Kongsberg SA9510S MkII; Sea bed navigation: EM2040 Mil and EA640 echosounders; Masts: L3 Harris masts and control units (without the payload); Optical sensors: Hensoldt OMS 150 and OMS 300 optronics masts; Hensoldt i360°OS panoramic surveillance system; Radar: Indra Sistemas navigation radar
- Electronic warfare & decoys: Indra Sistemas digital EW systems
- Armament: Up to 14 torpedoes, missiles and drones; Torpedoes: 6 × 533 mm (21.0 in) torpedo tubes; CHWT (Common Heavy Weight Torpedo), a successor to the DM2A4 Hake heavy torpedoes, also known as DM2A5; Seaspider anti-torpedo torpedo; Missiles: Anti-air / anti light vessel: IDAS; Under consideration: NSM-SL, 3SM Tyrfing; Unmanned underwater vehicle: IAI BlueWhale potentially

The Type 212CD (for Common Design) is a submarine class developed by ThyssenKrupp Marine Systems (TKMS) for the Norwegian and German navies. The class is derived from the Type 212A submarine, but will be significantly larger than the 212A class.

== Project history ==
A €5.5 billion contract for development and procurement of the six submarines was placed with TKMS on 8 July 2021 after the German and Norwegian governments reached an agreement in principle in March. This followed an extensive period of negotiation between industry and the two governments which took place after Norway had, in 2017, decided on an extensive naval partnership with Germany and TKMS for their Ula-class replacement project. The Ula-class submarines were also built by TKMS/HDW.

In Kiel, a German-Norwegian Building Program Office (BPO) is to be set up and tasked with representing the two states in matters of design, construction and acceptance. Management will alternate between a German and Norwegian representative, with a third of the staff being Norwegian.

Afterwards, a Lifetime Management Program Office (LMPO) is to be established in Haakonsvern Naval Base. Management will also alternate, with a third of the staff being German. The office is to handle questions concerning maintenance and repairs of the submarines. Norway will establish maintenance facilities for both countries submarines. Construction of the first submarine started in September 2023.

According to the Norwegian Armed Forces Long-Term Plan adopted by the Norwegian Parliament on 4 June 2024, Norway will purchase two more submarines in addition to the four submarines already ordered from Germany.

Norwegian and German U212CD (Common Design) submarines are to be based together in Southern Norway. A Norwegian Ministry of Defence official told Janes on 7 June 2024 that a new base for the U212CD, including infrastructure, would be built at Haakonsvern, where Norway's current Ula-class submarines are already based. The new infrastructure will include pier, maintenance, and test facilities for the U212CD.

=== Canada selection ===
The Canadian Patrol Submarine Project (CPSP) was initiated in the 2020s to replace the Victoria-class submarines. In 2023, the Royal Canadian Navy listed 15 requirements on which the contenders would be evaluated. In 2024, a formal request for information was launched.

Canada approached the following manufacturers which offered the following submarines:

- Hanwha Ocean, Jang Yeongsil class (the KSS-III - Batch II)
- MHI, Taigei class
- Naval Group, Orka class
- Navantia, S-80 Plus class
- Saab Kockums, C71 Expeditionary class (a variant of the A26 Blekinge class)
- TKMS, Type 212CD

Canada short-listed the Type 212CD and the Jang Yeongsil in August 2025. Germany and South Korea started to implement an industrial, technical and capabilities competition to earn the contract.

Canada selected TKMS to build its new submarines in July 2026, joining a trilateral strategic NATO partnership with Germany and Norway. Up to 12 submarines are planned, with at least 5 to be delivered by 2036, including some that were initially planned for the German Navy.

== Submarine design ==
The submarines will be based on, but nearly twice the size of the current Type 212A and features a new stealth design—the hull will be diamond-shaped to reduce its signature on enemy active sonars.

=== Critical design review ===
In August 2024, the Norwegian Ministry of Defence announced having completed the design review of the Type 212CD programme. As a result of completing the Critical Design Review (CDR), the production of the submarines will be intensified.

=== Propulsion ===
Just like the Type 212A, the submarines will be fitted with a hydrogen fuel cell-based air-independent propulsion system, although they will receive two (MTU 4000 series) diesel engines instead of one. The overall endurance is to be increased as well.

=== Command and control systems ===
The first batch of German Type 212A uses the MSI-90U Mk 2 CMS combat system which was developed by Kongsberg.

A new combat system ("ORCCA") to be developed by "kta naval systems", a joint venture between TKMS' naval electronics division Atlas Elektronik and Norwegian manufacturer Kongsberg will be installed on the boats and is claimed to allow the analysis of larger amounts of sensor data as well as to improve interoperability with allied forces. The contract was signed in December 2025 (NOK 3.5 billion / €291.8 million).

The ORCCA system is a multidomain system, it can fuse data from other sensors in the air or at the surface.

=== Sensors ===
Two photonics masts including sensors from Hensoldt (OMS 150 and OMS 300) will be used instead of the hull-penetrating periscope of the previous U212A class for search, surveillance and attack functions. A Hensoldt panoramic surveillance system will be installed while Kongsberg will contribute the active SA9510S MKII Mine Avoidance and Navigation Sonar as well as echo sounders for navigation.

=== Weapons ===
The submarines will feature 6 standard torpedo tubes (533 mm (21.0 in)). They are designed to deploy several types of weapons. In terms of torpedoes, a new generation of heavyweight torpedoes is in development DM2A5 (aka CHWT), and an anti-torpedo torpedo is in development, known as the Seaspider. In terms of missiles, it is likely that anti-ship missiles will be launched from the submarine (NSM-SL, 3SM Tyrfing). And an anti-air and anti light vessel missile is in development, derived from the IRIS-T missile, the IDAS.

Underwater drones are planned to be deployed from the Type 212CD. One candidate is the IAI BlueWhale.

== Construction ==
The submarines will be built at TKMS's shipyards in Kiel and Wismar. Following Canada's selection of the Type 212CD, TKMS CEO stated that earlier investments in TKMS's shipyards at Kiel and Wismar provided sufficient production capacity to deliver submarines for Germany, Norway, Canada, and future export customers.

=== Suppliers ===
From Germany, TKMS, Hensoldt and Atlas Elektronik are some of the main participants to the program. Kongsberg of Norway is participating in the project with production of some of the combat system equipment, sonars and other electronic equipment. Prior to the selection by Canada, several agreements were signed with the Canadian industry to localise the production. It includes:

- Seaspan ULC signed a teaming agreement with TKMS to get a sovereign capability for the sustainment and through-life support of naval ships.
- Magellan Aerospace signed an agreement for the production of heavy torpedoes and their maintenance, and participates in the development and production of anti-torpedo torpedoes.
- Strategic Teaming Agreement signed with EllisDon related to long-term infrastructure to support the CPSP.

TKMS signed agreements related to indigenous Canadians developments with:

  - Songhees Development Corporation, Des Nedhe Group Defence and Glooscap Ventures, Inuit Development Corporation Association
Following the selection of the Type 212CD, TKMS announced that the following companies and industries would join the programme.
- Canadian steel industry to supply non-magnetic steel
- CAE Inc. will supply simulators

== List of boats ==
Name	No.	Order in class	Status	Contract	Laid down	Launched	Comm.	Notes
German Navy (6 ordered + 3 planned)
U-37	S187	3th	Under contract	30 Aug 2021	started	–	2031	–
U-38	S188	5th	Under contract	30 Aug 2021	–	–	2034	–
U-39	S189	–	Under contract	19 Dec 2024	–	–	–	–
U-40	S190	–	Under contract	19 Dec 2024	–	–	–	–
U-41	S191	–	Under contract	19 Dec 2024	–	–	–	–
U-42	S192	–	Under contract	19 Dec 2024	–	–	–	–
TBA	TBA	–	Up to 3 additional expected	–	–	–	–	As part of the Zielbild der Marine ab 2035 (Vision for the Navy 2035), Germany plans to have a total of 6 to 9 Type 212 CD, therefore 3 additional submarines might be ordered.
TBA	TBA	–	Up to 3 additional expected	–	–	–	–	As part of the Zielbild der Marine ab 2035 (Vision for the Navy 2035), Germany plans to have a total of 6 to 9 Type 212 CD, therefore 3 additional submarines might be ordered.
TBA	TBA	–	Up to 3 additional expected	–	–	–	–	As part of the Zielbild der Marine ab 2035 (Vision for the Navy 2035), Germany plans to have a total of 6 to 9 Type 212 CD, therefore 3 additional submarines might be ordered.
Royal Norwegian Navy (6 ordered)
TBA	TBA	1th	Under construction	30 Aug 2021	12 Sep 2023	2027	2029	
TBA	TBA	2th	Under construction	30 Aug 2021	2024	–	2030	
TBA	TBA	4th	Under contract	30 Aug 2021	–	–	2033	
TBA	TBA	6th	Under contract	30 Aug 2021	–	–	2035	
TBA	TBA	–	Under contract	30 Jan 2026	–	–	–	
TBA	TBA	–	Under contract	30 Jan 2026	–	–		
Royal Canadian Navy (12 planned)
TBA	TBA	–	Selected and in exclusive contract negotiation	–	–	–	–	Contracts to be finalised by the end of 2027, with four submarines delivered by 2034.
TBA	TBA	–	Selected and in exclusive contract negotiation	–	–	–	–	Contracts to be finalised by the end of 2027, with four submarines delivered by 2034.
TBA	TBA	–	Selected and in exclusive contract negotiation	–	–	–	–	Contracts to be finalised by the end of 2027, with four submarines delivered by 2034.
TBA	TBA	–	Selected and in exclusive contract negotiation	–	–	–	–	Contracts to be finalised by the end of 2027, with four submarines delivered by 2034.
TBA	TBA	–	Selected and in exclusive contract negotiation	–	–	–	–	Contracts to be finalised by the end of 2027, with four submarines delivered by 2034.
TBA	TBA	–	Selected and in exclusive contract negotiation	–	–	–	–	Contracts to be finalised by the end of 2027, with four submarines delivered by 2034.
TBA	TBA	–	Additional planned	–	–	–	–	
TBA	TBA	–	Additional planned	–	–	–	–	
TBA	TBA	–	Additional planned	–	–	–	–	
TBA	TBA	–	Additional planned	–	–	–	–	
TBA	TBA	–	Additional planned	–	–	–	–	
TBA	TBA	–	Additional planned	–	–	–	–	

Planned commissioning
Ships planned

== Operators ==
=== Future operators ===
Germany (6)
2 boats to be delivered in 2032 and 2034.
In December 2024, the German parliament approved the purchase for 4 additional submarines of this type. The contract was also signed in December 2024.
Norway (6)
In March 2021, the Norwegian Navy ordered 4 boats. The contract was signed in July 2021. The submarines are to be delivered from 2029 to 2035.
In June 2023, the Norwegian Defence Chief recommended to increase the order to 6. In December 2025, the government made the decision to purchase the 2 additional submarines. The purchase was approved by the parliament in January 2026 and the contract was signed.
At CANSEC on 28 May 2026, Germany and Norway jointly urged Canada to select the Type 212CD, offering four boats by 2036; with the German and Norwegian fleets this would form a 24-boat NATO operator community.
Canada (12)
Germany and Norway offered an Arctic protection partnership to Canada, which includes the Type 212 CD for Canada. In July 2024, Canada publicly unveiled its plan for the future of its navy, which includes up to 12 submarines. On 26 August 2025 the Type 212CD was shortlisted alongside the KSS-III Batch-II as the only qualified options under the Canadian Patrol Submarine Project. On 6 July 2026, the Government of Canada selected the Type 212CD as the Royal Canadian Navy's new fleet of submarines.

=== Potential contracts ===
Germany (3 additional)
According to the Zielbild Marine 2035+ plan, the German navy will operate from 6 to 9 Type 212 CD, and it includes the successors to the Type 212A, which would mean up to 3 additional Type 212 CD to be ordered.
Greece
Germany is offering the U212CD to the Hellenic Navy.

=== Failed bids ===
Netherlands
The Type 212CD was in competition with the pair Saab Kockums / Damen with a Blekinge derivative submarine and with Naval Group who proposed the Orka class. TKMS had offered an expeditionary variant of the Type 212CD submarine to the Netherlands; the Type 212CD E. This variant has a surface displacement of c. 3,100 tons and a submerged displacement of c. 3,450 tons. In addition, the boat has a length of more than 80 meters. Naval Group won the competition in April 2024 and should build 4 ships if approved by the parliament.
Poland
The Polish Navy planned to purchase 3 attack submarines as part of its Orka programme. The mentioned competitors include the A26 Blekinge, the KSS-III, the S-80, the Scorpène SSK, the U212 NFS and the Type 212CD.
Ultimately, the Polish Navy selected the A26 Blekinge in November 2025.

== See also ==
Equivalent submarines of the same era

- Type 039C
- Hai Kun class
- Lada class
- Invincible class
