= S-80 Plus-class submarine =

Spanish Navy submarine class

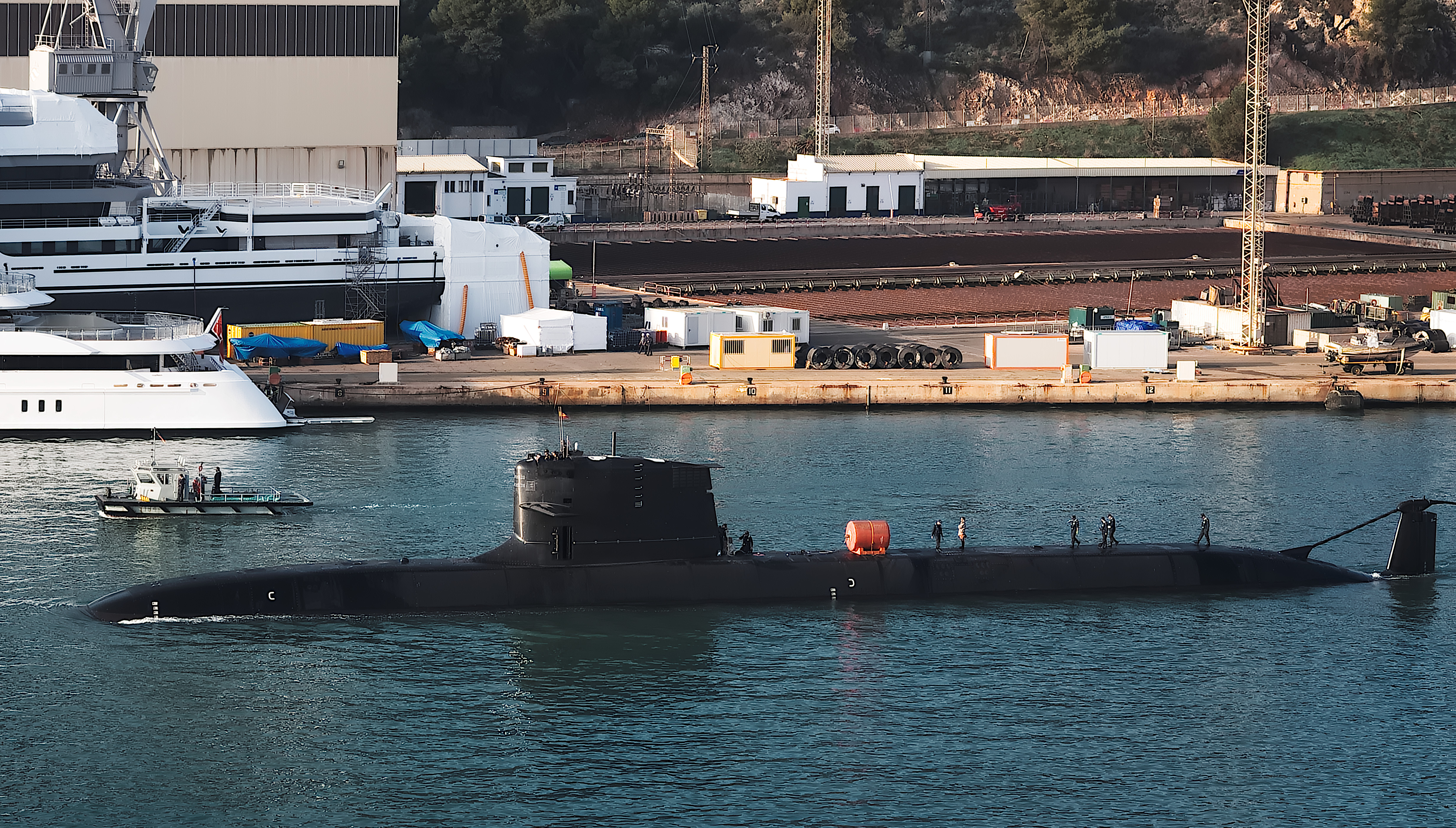
- S-80 Plus-class Isaac Peral (S-81)

Class overview
- Builders: Navantia
- Operators: Spanish Navy
- Preceded by: Galerna class
- Cost: €3.935 billion (2018) for 4 units; €983.75 million (2018) per unit
- Built: 2005–2029 (planned)
- In commission: 2023-present
- Planned: Batch 1: 4; Batch 2: 2
- Building: 2
- Completed: 2
- Active: 1

General characteristics
- Type: Submarine with air-independent propulsion (AIP)
- Displacement: 2,965 t (2,918 long tons) submerged
- Length: 81.05 m (265 ft 11 in)
- Beam: 11.68 m (38 ft 4 in)
- Draught: 7.3 m (23 ft 11 in)
- Propulsion: 1 × shaft Etanol-AIP; 3 × MTU-16V-396SE-85L (3 × 1,200 kW (1,600 hp)) diesel engines (bio-ethanol fuel); 1 × UTC Power AIP fuel cell unit (300 kW) (installed on S-83 / S-84; to be retrofitted on S-81 / S-82) (bio-ethanol fuel); 1 × Gamesa Electric electric motor 3,500 kW (4,700 hp); Vulkan couplings RATO-S G-561W (280 kN⋅m (210,000 lb⋅ft))
- Speed: 12 knots (22 km/h; 14 mph) surfaced; 19 knots (35 km/h; 22 mph) submerged
- Range: 8,000 km (5,000 mi)
- Endurance: 30-55 days in immersion
- Test depth: 460 m (1,510 ft)
- Complement: 32 (plus 8 troops)
- Sensors & processing systems: Systems: Navantia ICSC (Integrated Combat System Core) combining: Lockheed Martin SUBICS; L3 Harris IPMS (Integrated Platform Management System); INS, GPS navigation; Communication suite (LF, VLF, HF, VHF, UHF, SATCOM); Sonars: Lockheed Martin-supplied integrated sonar suite: 1 × L3Harris medium-frequency passive cylindrical array; 2 × low-frequency passive flank arrays; 1 × SAES Solarsub very-low-frequency passive reelable towed array; Ranging arrays; Intercept arrays; Masts: non-penetrating L3 Harris masts; L3Harris Mod 2010 OS optronics mast; Radar: Indra Sistemas ARIES-S surface and navigation radar with Mode 5 IFF; Communications: Indra Sistemas TSUB SATCOM terminal (X-band and Ku-band); Tecnobit LINPRO multi datalink processor
- Electronic warfare & decoys: Indra Sistemas Pegaso digital EW (ELINT, COMINT, CESM, RESM)
- Armament: Torpedo tubes: 6 × 533 mm (21.0 in); Torpedoes: DM2A4; Anti-ship missiles: NSM-SL (studies); Mines: Cylindrical multi-influence mines; MINEA smart bottom mines; Weapons available for export clients: Torpedoes (Mk48, Black Shark, Spearfish MOD 1, Torped 2000); Anti-ship missiles (UGM-84 Harpoon, SM40 Exocet); Cruise missiles: (UGM-109 Toomahawk)
- Notes: AIP reactor autonomy: 28 days

The S-80 Plus class (or Isaac Peral class) is a Spanish class of four submarines being built by the state-owned Spanish company Navantia at its Cartagena shipyard for the Spanish Navy. In common with other contemporary submarines, they feature air-independent propulsion.

The class has its roots in the late 1990s, and Spain ordered the submarines into production in 2003. Due to problems with the design, it had to be extensively redesigned in the 2010s, and a Spanish government budget crisis forced additional delays. On November 30, 2023, the first submarine of the class entered service with the Spanish Navy.

They are oceanic submarines of medium tonnage with the capacity to carry out long duration missions in scenarios far from their base, and to do so stealthily. They will have an integrated platform control system that allows operation with a reduced crew complement and a high degree of automation with remote control. The characteristics of this class of ships place them at a level close to those of nuclear propulsion.

The lead boat in the class, the Isaac Peral, the first unit in the series, was launched by King Felipe VI and his daughter, Princess Leonor, heir to the throne, on 22 April 2021 at the Cartagena shipyards, entered to service in 2023, after originally being targeted for 2011. In 2024, the delivery date for the second vessel had slipped to 2025. The remaining three boats are slated to be delivered in 2026 and 2028. However, the second boat had later been delayed until 2026 with the third and fourth vessels of the class planned for service entry in 2028 and 2029, respectively. The S-80 class has also been offered for export.

== History ==
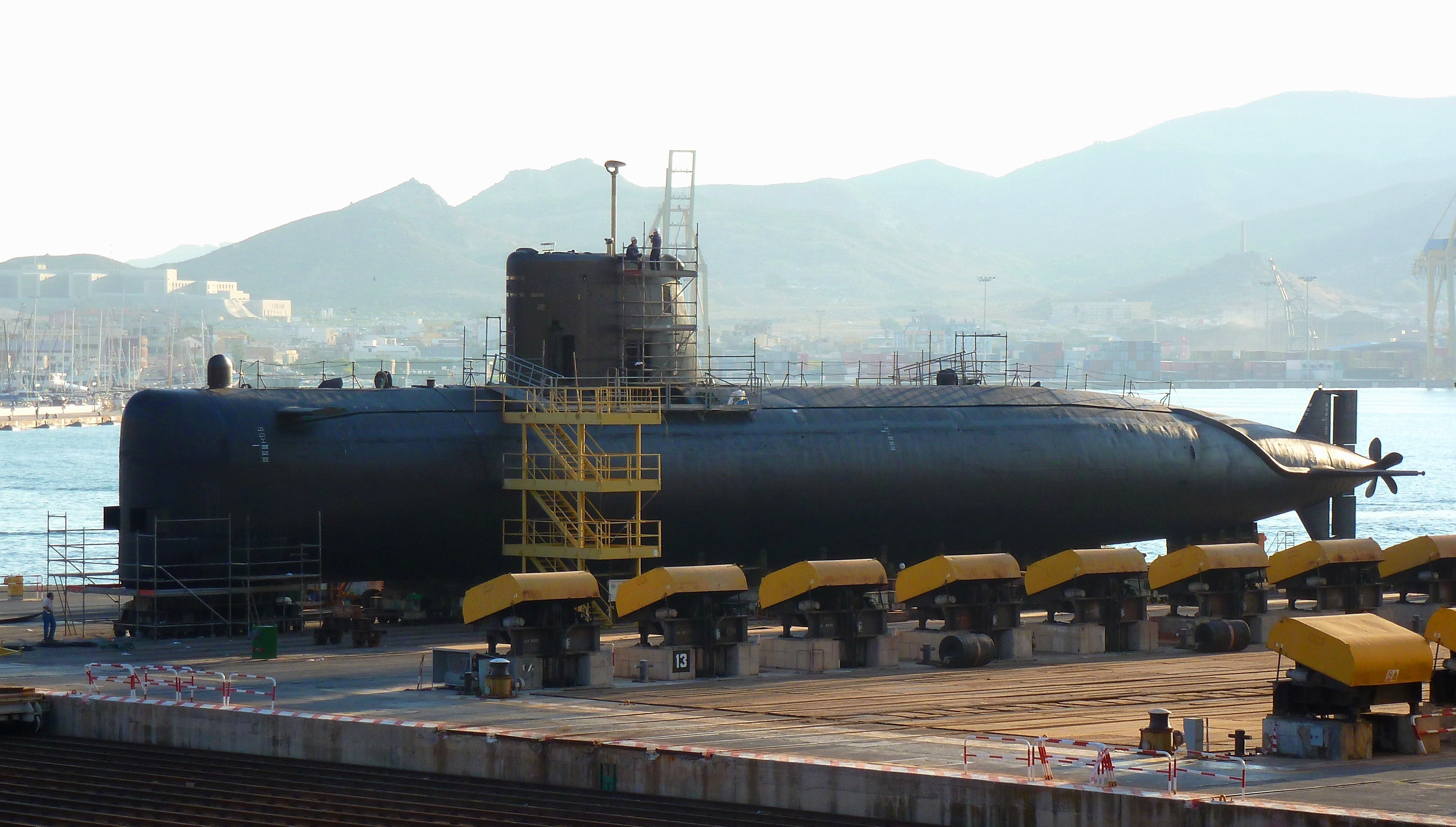
Submarine Mistral (S-73) of the Agosta-class submarine (S-70). It was in service until 2020. Galerna (S-71) is still active.

In the 1980s, France began studies for the replacement of their S-60 Daphné-class diesel submarines. The French shipyard DCNI (Direction des Constructions Navales International) came up with an all-new design called S-80, with a teardrop hull and new weapons and sensors, which the French government ultimately decided not to fund. DCNI then proposed a cheaper option called the S-90B, an S-70 Agosta-class submarine with limited improvements, which was rejected by the French but exported to Pakistan. As the Spanish Navy faced the same problem in replacing their Daphnés, known as the Delfín class in Spanish service. As part of Plan ALTAMAR, the firm Bazán (later Izar, and then subsequently, the Spanish state-owned Navantia) started on a new design. It was later agreed to collaborate in a joint venture based on the French S-80. This joint design was shown at Euronaval in October 1990.

The end of the Cold War meant that funding dried up and the joint venture had to wait until 1997 for their first sale of the new design to Chile, which was designated the Scorpène class in export markets. The same year Spain started to look again at its requirements, and in 1998 they indicated that they would buy four Scorpènes, optionally with an air-independent propulsion (AIP) system for greater endurance when submerged. A staff requirement for the S-80 Scorpène variant was completed in October 2001. This was soon overtaken by events, as the Armada (Spanish Navy) became more interested in using submarines for power projection than static defensive role. This shift was codified in guidance of January 2002 from the Chief of Naval Operations and in a strategic defence review in February 2003. The new requirement called for a larger submarine with better endurance and land-attack missiles, which became known as the S-80A design. This was an AIP submarine with a hull diameter of 7.3 metres (23 ft 11 in), compared to 6.2 metres (20 ft 4 in) for the Scorpène family, a submerged displacement of around 2,990 tonnes versus 1,740 tonnes, larger rudder surfaces and a different fin position.

The Spanish government approved the purchase of four S-80A submarines in September 2003 and signed a contract with Izar on 24 March 2004. The original deal was €1,756M to design and build four submarines, about €439M per boat. However, this had increased to €2,212M by 2010 (€553M per boat). The plan envisaged the first boat to be delivered in 2011 but government dithering over the company supplying the combat system pushed it back to 2013. In 2011, Spain's budget crisis further delayed the first delivery until 2015, with the remaining boats being delivered at one year intervals until 2018. Construction of S-81 began on 13 December 2007. In January 2012 the names were announced, honouring three engineers who made submarines and the first commander of Spain's submarine force respectively - Isaac Peral (S-81), Narciso Monturiol (S-82), Cosme García (S-83) and Mateo García de los Reyes (S-84).

By May 2013, with over US$680 million of the project's US$3 billion budget for the four submarines spent, an overweight issue was discovered and eventually made public. Navantia engineers had miscalculated the weight of the submarines by some 100 t (98 long tons; 110 short tons) of the total 2,000 tonne mass of the submarines, more than enough to sink the submarines if not fixed. As of 2013 Navantia announced the issue would delay the delivery of the first submarine to the Spanish Navy until at least 2017. That date proved to be optimistic. Lengthening the submarine created additional buoyancy. Navantia signed on the US company General Dynamics Electric Boat to help solve the excess weight design issue. In September 2014, the overweight issue was reported to have been resolved in design changes and the construction work to be ready to resume in late October 2014. In November 2014, Navantia again reported having completed the redesign work to address the problem of overweight. In all, the hull would be lengthened by 10 metres (33 ft), and the displacement increased by 100 tons. As of January 2018, the intended delivery date of the first submarine was to be September 2022, but this was not achieved. At the time of the boat's launch in 2021 it was indicated that the plan was for the first boat to start sea trials in 2022 and be delivered in 2023. Isaac Peral started sea trials in mid-2022, and completed its first static dive in March 2023.

In January 2017, it was reported that the air-independent propulsion system would not be ready in time for the delivery of the first submarine. In November 2018 Abengoa and Tecnicas Reunidas companies stated that the test for a new-type AIP engine of the submarine were successful. The Indian Navy considered the S-80 for its next generation of submarines under Project-75 class- submarine. On November 30, 2023, the first unit of the class, the S-81, entered service with the Spanish Navy. The Spanish government claims that S-81 is ready to join international exercises and S-82 will float in July 2025, though a strike led by the CSIF union could delay it. The workers complain about lower salaries than in other Navantia workplaces.

By 2025, the maintenance costs are predicted to be over 102 million euros, leaving the unit cost near 1 billion euros, a cost closer to that of nuclear submarines than to equivalent units. Out of 2,127 companies involved in the project, around 850 are Spanish. The funding however does not necessarily end mainly abroad.

On November 3rd, 2026, S-81 sank the decommisioned Descubierta-class corvette "Infanta Elena" with a DM2A4 torpedo, during the SINKEX 26 exercise of the Spanish Armada in the waters near the island of El Hierro. It is the first confirmed hit with a life munition of the S-80 class.

== Design ==
=== Propulsion ===
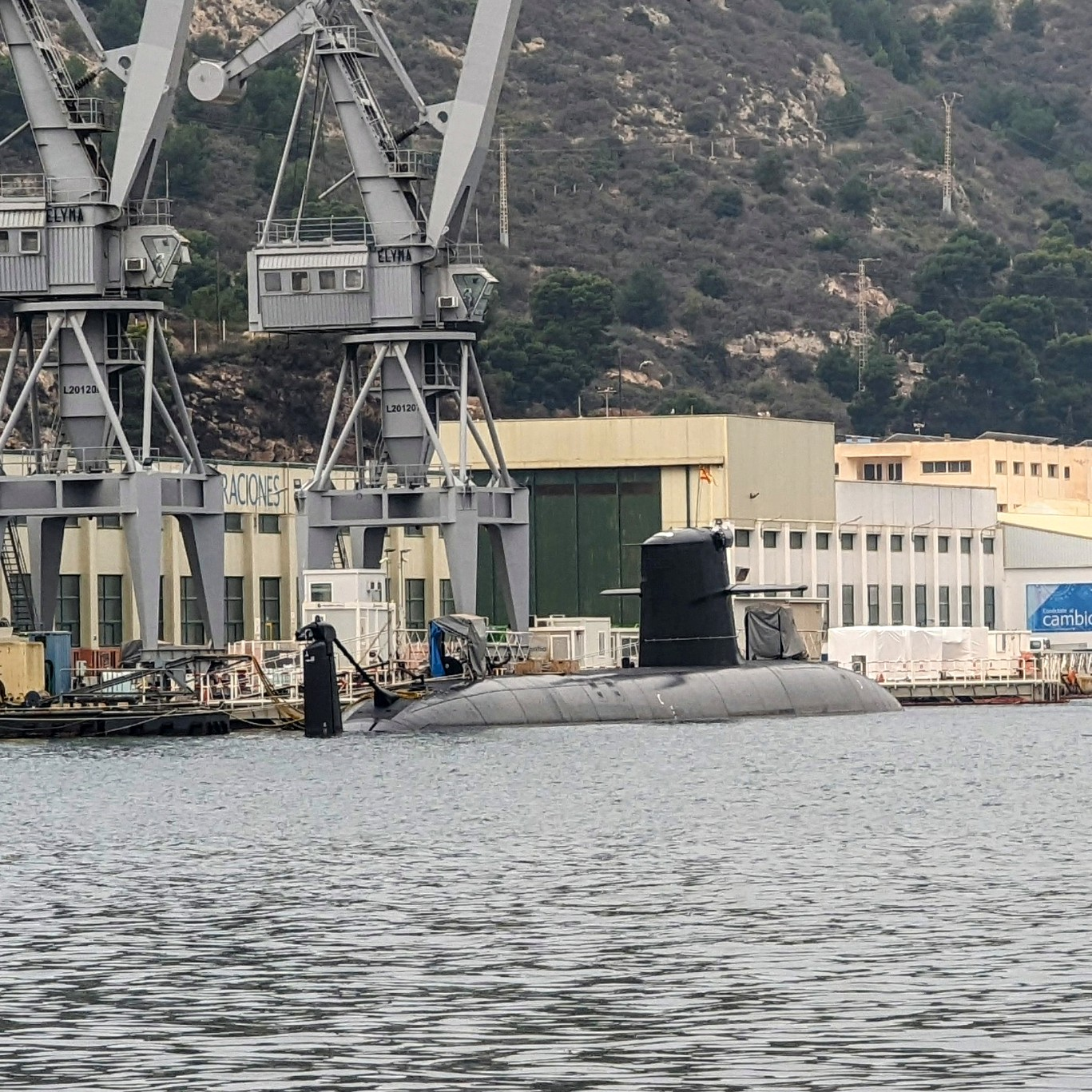
S-81 Isaac Peral in Cartagena port.

The S-80's air-independent propulsion (AIP) system is based on a bioethanol-processor consisting of a reaction chamber and several intermediate Coprox reactors. Provided by Hynergreen from Abengoa, the system transforms the bioethanol (BioEtOH) into high purity hydrogen. The output feeds a series of fuel cells from UTC Power company.

The reformator is fed with bioethanol as fuel and oxygen (stored as a liquid in a high pressure cryogenic tank), generating hydrogen and carbon dioxide as subproducts. The produced hydrogen and more oxygen is fed to the fuel cells.

The bioethanol-processor also produces a stream of highly concentrated carbon dioxide and other trace gases that are not burned completely during combustion. This gas flow is mixed with sea water in one or more ejector venturi scrubber and then through a new system, SECO_{2} (or CO_{2} Removal System), developed by Bionet, and whose purpose is to dissolve the "bubbles" of CO_{2} in water to undetectable levels.

The oxygen and fuel flow rates are directly determined by the demand for power. The AIP power in the S-80 submarine is at least 300 kW (400 hp). A permanent-magnet electric motor moves a fixed propeller of a special design, that doesn't create cavitations at high speed.

As operation of the engine can produce noise that resonates through the boat, the engines are mounted on flexible RATO-S G-561W couplings from Vulkan.

In December 2020, the Spanish Ministry of Defence announced the development of a Spanish fuel cell due to the high cost of the current SPC and to avoid the dependence on a foreign manufacturer. The program has a 6-year horizon to develop a 300 kW prototype.

=== Combat systems ===
The Integrated Combat System Core (ICSC) is called VC 9.0 SCA and was developed by Navantia and Lockheed Martin.

The entire combat system includes:

- 1 × Large Tactical Display for the commanding officer.
- 7 × MFCC that are identical and allow operational flexibility.
- 2 × NNSC, which are redundant, and it allocates displays, processing resources and interfaces in the submarine.
- ICSC Sonar Array Suite supplied by Lockheed Martin
  - 1 × bow cylindrical array sonar
  - 1 × combine acoustic window
  - 2 × combined flank array sonar and passive ranging sonar (low-medium frequency range detection)
  - 1 × towed array sonar
  - 1 × interceptor aray sonar
  - 1 × mine and obstacle detection sonar
  - 1 × own noise monitoring systems (monitoring and noise cancelling for the sonar system)

The ship is fitted with active and passive sonars with accurate electromagnetic detection systems. The submarine can communicate via Link-11 and Link-22 data links.

== Ships of the class ==
| Name | No. | Variant | Builder | Contract | Status | Laid down | Launched | Comm. | Homeport | Notes |
Spanish Navy
| Isaac Peral | S-81 | No AIP | Navantia, Cartagena shipyard | 24 Mar 2004 | In service | 13 Dec 2007 | 7 May 2021 | 30 Nov 2023 | Cartagena Naval Base | |
| Narcíso Monturiol | S-82 | No AIP | Navantia, Cartagena shipyard | | Trial (since Jun 2026) | 19 Feb 2009 | 3 Oct 2025 | 10 Dec 2026 | Cartagena Naval Base | |
| Cosme García | S-83 | With AIP | Navantia, Cartagena shipyard | | Under construction | 21 Jan 2010 | – | 2028 | Cartagena Naval Base | |
| Mateo García de los Reyes | S-84 | With AIP | Navantia, Cartagena shipyard | | | 2011 | – | 2029 | Cartagena Naval Base | |
| – | S-85 | With AIP | Navantia, Cartagena shipyard | – | – | – | – | – | Cartagena Naval Base | Plan to increase the number of active submarines to 6. |
| – | S-86 | With AIP | Navantia, Cartagena shipyard | – | – | – | – | – | Cartagena Naval Base | Plan to increase the number of active submarines to 6. |

Planned commissioning
Ships planned

== International bids ==
=== Potential operators ===
Philippines
Navantia has confirmed to the press that it has pitched an offer to sell submarines and build a submarine base and training center for the Philippine Navy. The submarine base specifically points to a location in Ormoc, Leyte.

=== Failed bids ===
India (6)
Larsen & Toubro and Navantia signed a Teaming Agreement (TA) for the purpose of submission of a techno-commercial bid for the Project-75 submarine acquisition project. In March 2024, Spain said that its submarine, in contention for a Rs 43,000 crore procurement order by the Indian Navy, had been declared technically compliant and would be ready for trials in a few months.
In January 2025, the S-80 lost the competition, as India considered that the lack of a proven AIP system made it an unsuitable candidate.
Netherlands (4)
The S-80 design was not accepted as a contender for the Walrus-class replacement program following an initial assessment & selection (B-letter) in 2019. In 2022 the Spanish Ministry of Defence sent a letter to the Dutch Defensie Materieel Organisatie for Navantia to be allowed to put in an offer following a RFQ sent to the remaining contenders, in which some of the requirements had changed. It is rumoured that the request was denied by DMO.
Poland (3)
The Polish Navy planned to purchase 3 attack submarines as part of its Orka programme. The mentioned competitors included the A26 Blekinge, the KSS-III, the S-80, the Scorpene SSK, the U212 NFS and the Type 212CD. Ultimately, the Polish Navy selected the A26 Blekinge in November 2025.

== Technology transfers ==
=== Potential transfers ===
Turkey
Navantia has allegedly granted a license for the design of its S-80 Air-Independent Propulsion (AIP) submarines to Turkey.

== See also ==
- List of submarine classes in service

Equivalent submarines of the same era

- Type 039C
- Project 636.3
- Hai Kun class
- Dosan Ahn Changho class
- Type 212CD
- Taigei class
