= Korean Attack Submarine program =

South Korean submarine arsenal project

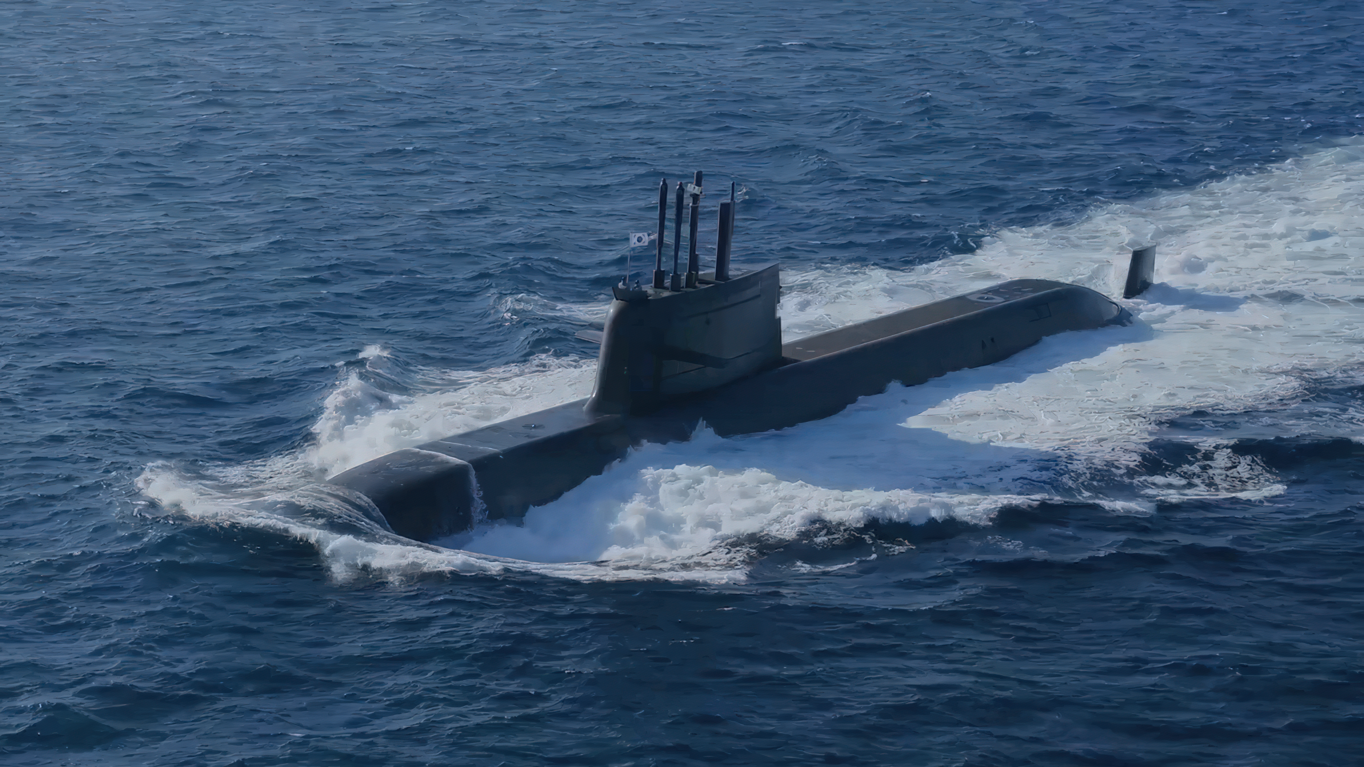
KSS-III Batch-I SS-083 Dosan Ahn Changho-class submarine

The Korean Attack Submarine program, KSS meaning Submarine, is a three-phased project to build up the Republic of Korea Navy (ROK Navy)'s attack submarine arsenal. Before the KSS program, the submarine fleet of the ROK Navy consisted of midget submarines, such as the Dolgorae class submarine and SX 756 Dolphin class submarine, which had limited capabilities for inshore operations. The KSS program sought to acquire submarines that can deter hostile submarines and surface ships; protect friendly naval bases and sea shores communications; carry out reconnaissance missions.

Through the first phase, KSS-I, the ROK Navy acquired nine 1,200-ton Jang Bogo-class submarines (장보고 급). For the second phase, KSS-II, the ROK Navy plans to acquire nine 1,800-ton Type 214 submarines equipped with Air-independent propulsion (AIP) the lead ship of her class, ROKS Sohn Won-il (SS 072) was launched at a shipyard of Hyundai Heavy Industries on 9 June 2006. The first batch of these submarines is one of three, the second batch will be one of 6 and a $16 million deal has been awarded to SAAB for the electronics that are going to be used for the vessels delivered in the second batch submarines. The third part of the program, KSS-III began in 2007. This class will have significant improvements when compared to its predecessors. A total of nine 3,000-ton KSS-III submarines are expected to be built in South Korea with indigenous technologies (i.e. not going under license as the previous KSS-I and KSS-II submarines).

In May 2009, South Korea decided to delay by two years its KSS-III project, also known as Jangbogo III programme. The project is expected to cost around US$900 million per submarine.

The first KSS-III ship will be ready for service by 2025. The previous plan was to have an operational unit ready by 2017. Due to the relatively heavy displacement of the ship (3000~3500 tons) and the fact that it will be built with local Korean technologies (sensitive technologies might be blocked from export) the production of the submarine was delayed. This new class of ship will have the Korean Vertical Launching System which will be able to carry up to 10 indigenous Chonryong submarine-launched cruise missiles. The first submarine in the Republic of Korea Navy to have this kind of capability. It will also have many other improvements compared to its predecessors. Reports indicate South Korea might even deploy SLBMs inside the vertical launchers. Development of SLBMs by Agency for Defense Development is expected to be completed by 2020. SLBMs will be a derivative of Hyunmoo-2 ballistic missiles.

The first KSS-III heavy diesel-electric submarine construction was launched on 17 September 2018. The name of the first ship of KSS-III has been named Dosan An Chang-Ho, thus KSS-III is now named as Dosan An Chang-Ho-class Submarine. It is expected to undergo 2 years of sea trials and be handed over to the navy in 2020 or early 2021.

It is expected that three batches, with three submarines in each batch, will be built by 2029.

== Specification KSS-III (Jangbogo III) heavy diesel-electric submarine ==
Batch-I:

Full-length: 83.5m
Beam: 9.6m
Pressure sensor diameter: 7.7m
Draught: 7.62m
Crew: 50 sailors
Maximum speed: 20 knots
Cruising range: 10,000 nm
Surface tonnage: 3358 tons
Submerged tonnage: 3705 tons

== See also ==
- KDX-III
- Type 214 submarine
- Type 209 submarine

Similar procurement projects

- Canadian Patrol Submarine
- Walrus-class replacement program
- SSN-AUKUS
- Submarine-building Perspective Plan
