= Shayetet 7 =

7th Flotilla
- שייטת הצוללות
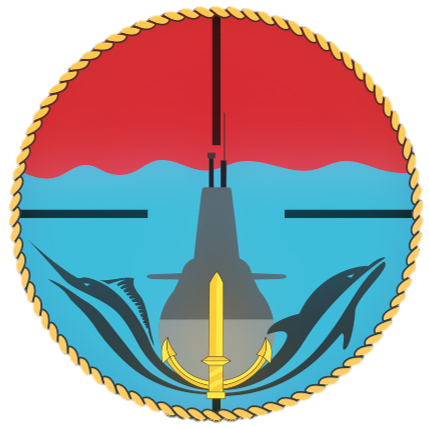
- Coat of arms of Shayetet 7
- Active: 1959–present
- Country: Israel
- Branch: Israeli Navy
- Type: Submarine flotilla
- Size: 6 submarines and 300 personnel
- Part of: Israeli Navy
- Garrison/HQ: Haifa naval base
- Nickname: 700 Club
- Engagements: Six Day War; 1982 Lebanon War; Sudan strikes Syrian Civil War

Commanders
- Current commander: Colonel Uri
- Notable commanders: #Commanders

Shayetet 7 is the submarine flotilla of the Israeli Navy. It is based in Haifa naval base and operates Dolphin-class submarines. It was established in 1959 and is considered an elite unit due to the nature of its services.

== Nature of service ==
The service in the submarine fleet is difficult, challenging and often far from the country's borders, so the submarine crews have to be very cohesive. Another derivative of the great distance from the country's borders is that the submarine crew is operationally competent and ready for war at any time.

Every operational mission of the submarine has a military doctor and a medic on board who have undergone special training to treat the wounded, including dealing with a multi-casualty incidents, deep under the surface of the water. In the absence of an emergency, the doctor who joins any operational mission also carries an intelligence role for everything, in which he is engaged throughout the mission as one of the combatants.

The unit's objectives include

- Attacking enemy vessels
- Covert intelligence gathering
- Deployment and recovery of Shayetet 13 naval commandos
- Acting as a support unit for other units
- Believed to be part of the country's nuclear weapons capability.

== Fleet ==
Class	Photo	Boats	Commission year	Origin	Notes
Dolphin class		INS Dolphin, [do̞lˈfin] (Dolphin) INS Livyathan, [livjaˈtan] (Whale) INS Tekumah, [tkuˈma] (Revival)	1999 1999 2000	Germany	Expected to be replaced with the Dakar-class submarines starting in the early 2030s
AIP Dolphin 2 class		INS Tanin, [taˈnin] (Crocodile) INS Rahav, [ˈʁahav] (Rahab) INS Drakon, [dʁaˈko̞n] (Dragon)	2012 2014 2023?	Germany	

== History ==
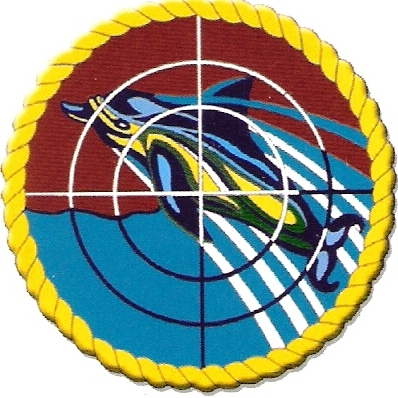
Previous logo of the flotilla till 2023

=== Establishment ===
Two used S-class submarines were purchased from the Royal Navy. These submarines were built in World War II, and refurbished in England for the Israeli Navy. An Israeli team that went through a training period in France and the United Kingdom under British supervision was the crew for the first submarine. The flotilla was established on December 16, 1959, when INS Tanin (C-71) entered the port of Haifa. The second submarine, INS Rahav (C-73), arrived at the shores of Israel in July 1960.

=== Six Day War ===
During the Six Day War, the flotilla participated in the Operation Alexandria in which Tanin led six fighters from Shayetet 13 into action in the port of Alexandria . While waiting to collect the divers, the submarine was attacked by an Egyptian vessel and damaged. The next day she returned to the meeting place to collect but the divers had already been captured by the Egyptians. Multiple civilian ships were destroyed in this operation.

=== Arrival of T submarines ===
In 1965, Israel purchased three T-class submarines from the Royal Navy: Leviathan, Decker, and Dolphin. The T-class submarines were larger and more sophisticated than the S-class submarines, but they were also outdated submarines from the World War II period that had undergone a process of upgrade and renovation. The submarines arrived after the Six Day War.

=== Sinking of INS Dakar ===
A submarine of the flotilla, INS Dakar, sunk on January 25, 1968, on its way from Britain to Israel and all 69 members of its crew perished. The remains of the submarine and the place where it sank were only discovered in 1999.

=== Yom Kippur War ===
The flotilla did not take part in the Yom Kippur War due to maintenance issues.

=== Introduction of Gal-class submarines ===
The Gal-class submarines entered the service in the flotilla in the late 1970s, these small but agile and sophisticated submarines were continuously upgraded with newer systems to maintain their technological edge. They were somewhat unusual in that all boats of the class were at equipped with six-tube retractable Blowpipe surface-to-air missile launchers controlled from inside the boat, though these were later removed.

=== 1982 Lebanon War ===
The flotilla participated in the 1982 Lebanon War and carried out Operation Dreyfus which was a military operation to locate and identify enemy ships using submarines . In June 1982, during the operation, an Israeli Navy submarine hit a civilian ship carrying refugees, due to the suspicion that they were terrorists. 25 people were killed in the incident.

=== Introduction of Dolphin-class submarines ===
Starting from 1999, the Dolphin-class submarines have continued to serve the Israeli Navy as a part of the flotilla and are expected to continue their service till 2030.

=== Sudan airstrikes ===
In November–December 2011 two Israeli air raids against Gaza-bound weapon smugglers in Sudan were accompanied by Israeli submarine activity off the Sudanese coast.

=== Syrian civil war ===
On July 5, 2013, during the Syrian civil war, an Israeli missile strike against the Syrian port of Latakia was made in coordination with the United States, with long-range missiles launched from a Dolphin-class submarine. The attack targeted newly unloaded Russian-made Yakhont long-range high-performance anti-ship missiles and associated radars.

== Commanders ==
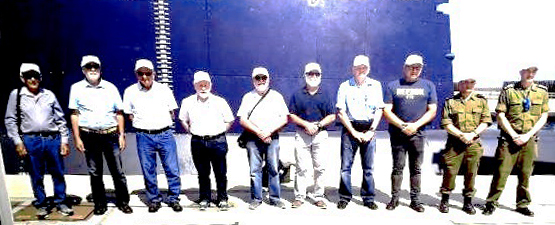
Meeting of the former commanders of the flotilla in 2019

Photo	Name	Period of office	Comments
	Yosef Dror	April 1959 – April 1963	First Commander
	Hadar Kimchi	April 1963 – May 1968	
	Abraham Dror	1968 – August 1972	Recipient of the Medal of Courage for his role in Operation Alexandria
	Gideon Raz	June 1972 – August 1973	
	Leshem Berg	1973–1976	
	Gideon Raz	January–October 1977	Second term of office
	Doron Amir	October 1977 – April 1980	
	Shaul Horev	May 1980 – June 1983	
	Michael Kisari	June 1983 – July 1987	
	Haim Kfir-Kopert	July 1987 – July 1990	
	Nir Maor	1990–1992	
	David Luria	July 1992 – March 1996	
	Uri Distnik	1996–1998	
	Yoval Tzur	1998–2001	
	Eyal Ben-Zion	2001–2004	
	Yonathan Vert	2004–2006	
	Amit Farber	2006–2008	
	Oded Gur Lavi	2008–2011	
	Gil Aginsky-Peretz	2011–2015	
Col. Doron	2015–2016		
Col. Assaf	2016–2019		
Col. Guy	July 2019 – July 2021		
Col. Uri	July 25, 2021 –	Current commander of the flotilla	
