= HMS Sanguine =

Submarine of the Royal Navy

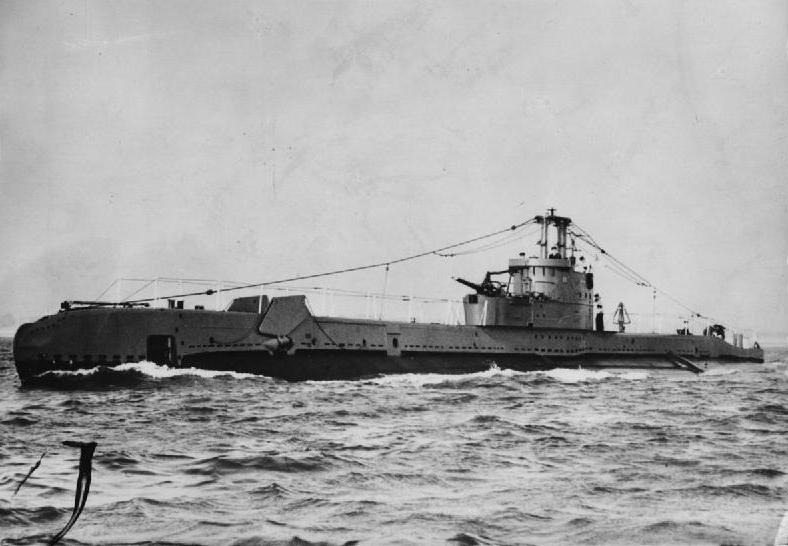
- HMS Sanguine

History

United Kingdom
- Name: Sanguine
- Builder: Cammell Laird, Birkenhead
- Laid down: 10 January 1944
- Launched: 15 February 1945
- Commissioned: 13 May 1945
- Out of service: Sold to Israeli Navy, 1958
- Badge

Israel
- Name: INS Rahav
- Acquired: 1958
- Fate: Cannibalised for spares for Tanin, 1968

General characteristics
- Class & type: S-class submarine
- Displacement: 814-872 tons surfaced; 990 tons submerged
- Length: 217 ft (66 m)
- Beam: 23 ft 6 in (7.16 m)
- Draught: 11 ft (3.4 m)
- Speed: 14.75 knots (27.32 km/h; 16.97 mph) surfaced; 8 knots (15 km/h; 9.2 mph) submerged
- Complement: 48
- Armament: 6 × forward 21-inch (533 mm) torpedo tubes, one aft; 13 torpedoes; 1 × three-inch (76 mm) gun (QF 4-inch on later boats); 1 × 20 mm cannon; 3 × .303-calibre machine guns

HMS Sanguine was an S-class submarine of the Royal Navy, and part of the Third Group built of that class. She was built by Cammell Laird and launched on 15 February 1945. So far she has been the only ship of the Royal Navy to bear the name Sanguine.

Built as the Second World War was drawing to a close, she did not see much action. In 1953 she took part in the Fleet Review to celebrate the Coronation of Queen Elizabeth II.

== Israeli Navy as Rahav ==
Sanguine was sold to the Israeli Navy in 1958 and renamed INS Rahav in March 1959, after the mythical sea-monster Rahab. The Rahav was not operational during the Six-Day War, and she was retired in 1968 and cannibalized for spare parts for Tanin, formerly HMS Springer (the only delivered operational Israeli submarine during the war), Rahav's sister ship which did see combat in 1967.

=== Legacy ===
A Gal-class submarine named Rahav served with the Israeli Navy from 1977 to 1997. The Dolphin-class submarine INS Rahav was delivered to the Israeli Navy on 29 April 2013.

== Publications ==
- Colledge, J. J.; Warlow, Ben (2006) [1969]. Ships of the Royal Navy: The Complete Record of All Fighting Ships of the Royal Navy from the 15th Century to the Present (3rd Rev ed.). London: Chatham Publishing. ISBN 978-1-86176-281-8. OCLC 67375475.
