= INS Rahav =

Rahav has been borne by three ships of the Israeli Navy and may refer to:

- INS Rahav (1958), a S-class submarine launched in 1945 as HMS Sanguine, she was transferred to Israel in 1958 and decommissioned in 1968.
- INS Rahav (1977), a Gal-class submarine launched in 1977 and decommissioned in 1997.
- INS Rahav (2013), a Dolphin-class submarine launched in 2013
