= INS Drakon =

Israeli Dolphin 2-class submarine

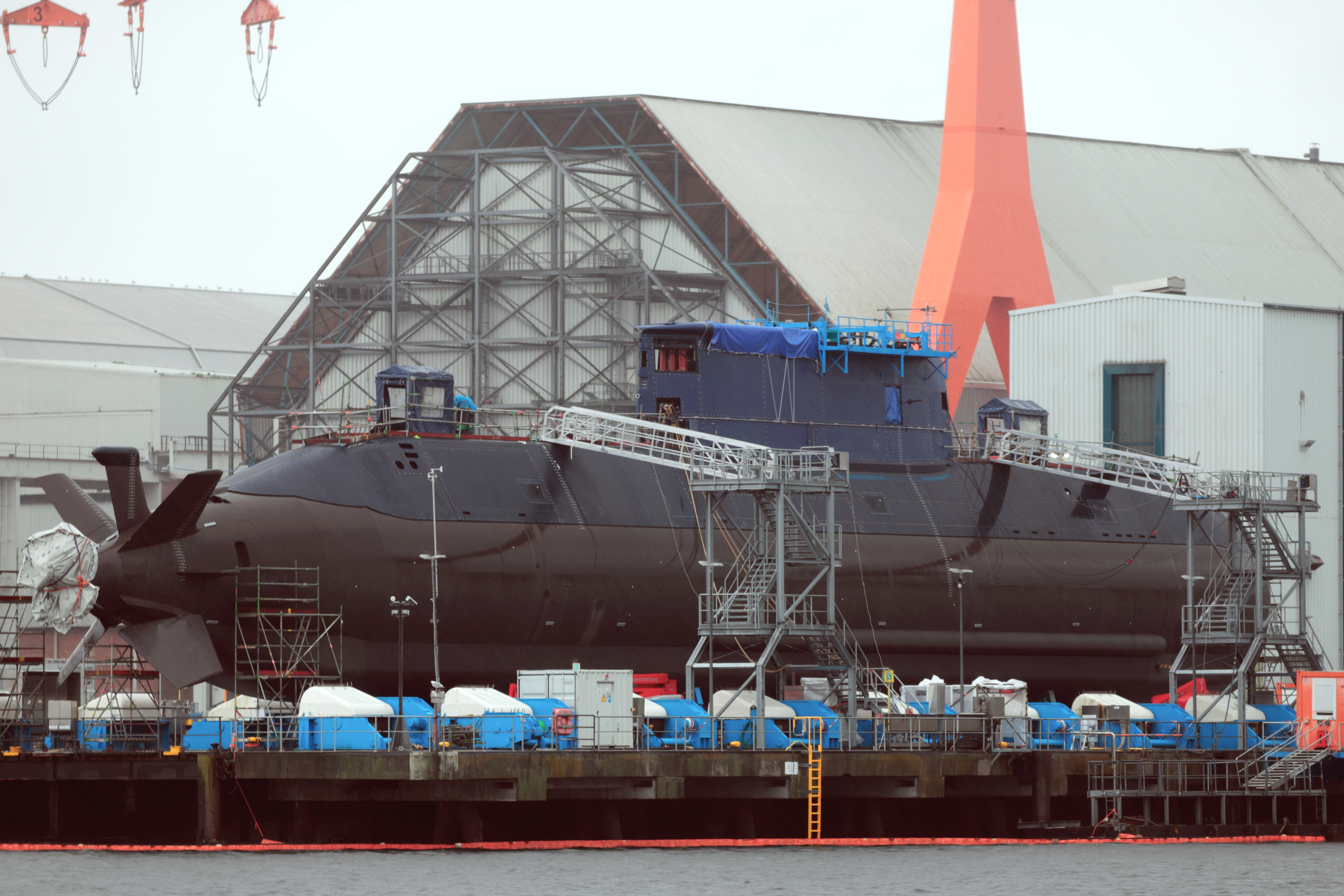
- The INS Drakon at the TKMS shipyard in Kiel, Germany, in August 2023

History

Israel
- Name: INS Drakon
- Ordered: 2012
- Builder: ThyssenKrupp Marine Systems, Kiel
- Cost: €650m
- Launched: 2017 (initial launch, prior to re-concepualization of the project)
- Commissioned: Expected in 2026
- Home port: TBD
- Status: In delivery as of August 2026
- Badge

General characteristics
- Class & type: Dolphin II-class submarine
- Type: Fuel cell AIP / diesel-electric attack submarine
- Displacement: 2,050 tons surfaced, 2,400 tons submerged
- Length: 74 m (243 ft) estimated
- Beam: 6.8 m (22 ft)
- Draught: 6.2 m (20 ft)
- Propulsion: Diesel-electric, 3 diesels, 1 shaft, 4,243 shp (3,164 kW)
- Speed: excess of 25 knots (46 km/h; 29 mph)
- Test depth: At least 350 m (1,150 ft)
- Complement: Up to 45 personnel
- Sensors & processing systems: Atlas Elektronik ISUS 90-1 Tactical Control System (TCS) for multiple operations including sensor management, weapon control and navigation.
- Armament: 6 × 533 mm (21.0 in) torpedo tubes; 4 × 650 mm (26 in) diameter torpedo tubes; Potential VLS system for Popeye Turbo SLCM (unconfirmed); DM2A4 Seehake wire-guided torpedoes; Triton IDAS anti-helicopter missiles

INS Drakon, or Dragon, is an Israeli Dolphin II-class air-independent propulsion / diesel-electric attack submarine. The submarine was built by ThyssenKrupp Marine Systems (TKMS) at their Howaldtswerke-Deutsche Werft (HDW) subsidiary in Kiel, Germany. Drakon is the largest submarine produced in Germany since the Second World War. Originally constructed to similar specifications as INS Tanin and INS Rahav, in 2018 the Israeli Navy reportedly decided to pursue a major strategic change to the project which added significant delays and costs.

Although unconfirmed by either the German or Israeli government, sightings of the vessel on sea trials in early 2022 sparked speculation that the Drakon would be longer than previous boats of its class and may have new weapon capabilities, including a vertical launching system (VLS).

The boat was reported to have been taken out of the water but re-launched again in August 2023. With the re-launch, photographs confirm a much larger sail which may accommodate its vertical launch missile silos, if these are indeed fit to the vessel. According to analysis conducted by Matus Smutny, the sail "could also contain a special release compartment for unmanned underwater vehicles (UUVs), aerial drones, and/or other special operations and intelligence-gathering equipment. The revised sail could also be related to some kind of proof-of-concept for technology to be used in the upcoming Dakar class".

The boat was originally planned to be named Dakar, after a vessel that mysteriously sank in 1968 with all of its crew on board.

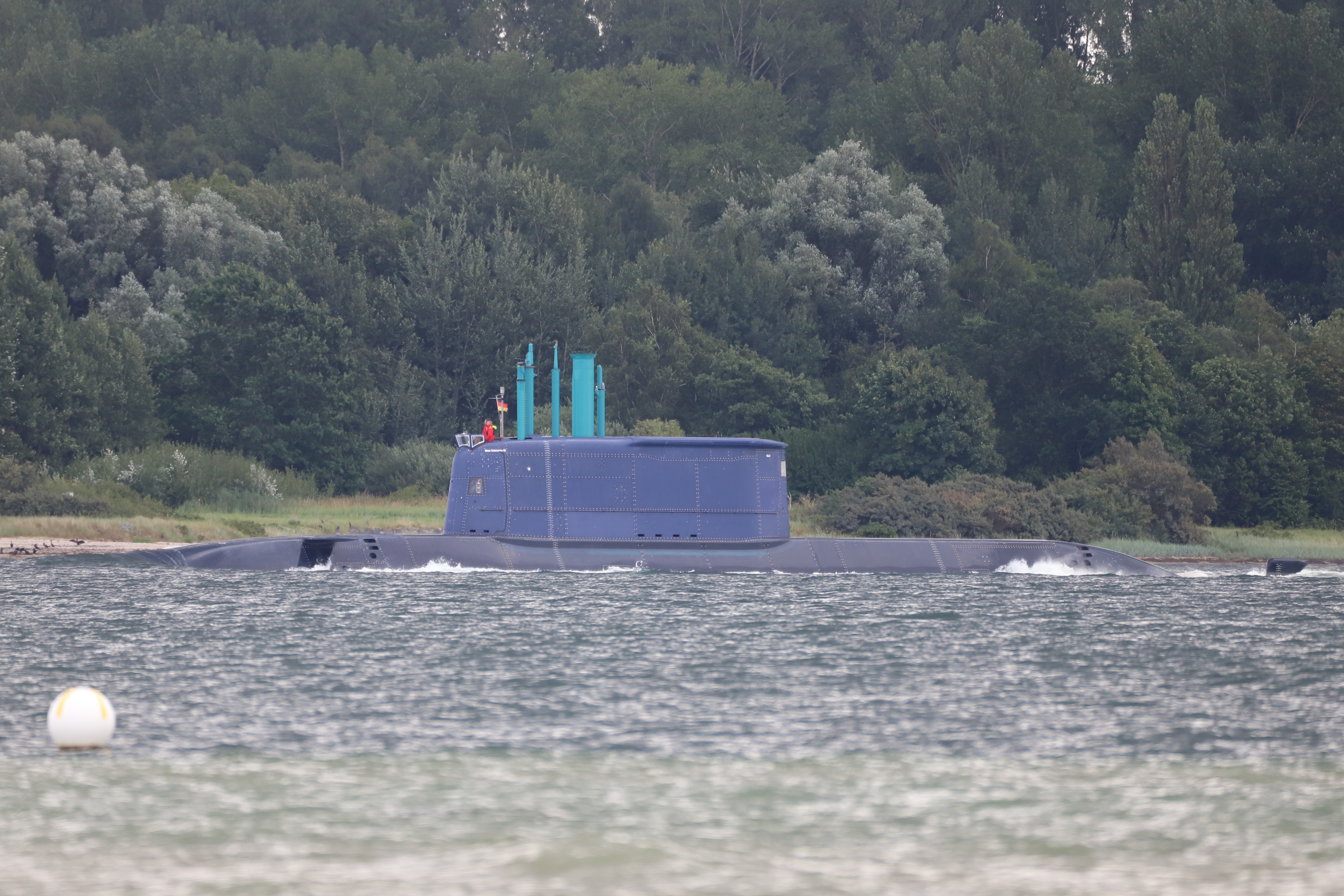
INS Drakon on sea trials out of Kiel

The INS Drakon was christened in Kiel on 12 November 2024 and was reported on sea trials as of July 2025. She had been scheduled to be delivered in the course of 2025 containing new technical systems. In addition to the christening, the start of construction of the future Dakar class was also celebrated with this christening ceremony. The submarine departed Germany in August 2026 on her delivery voyage to Israel.
