= Tannin (disambiguation) =

Tannin usually refers to astringent, bitter chemical compounds naturally occurring in plants, which are used in tanning hides and prominent in the taste of some red wines.

It may also refer to:

- Tannin, a monster in Levantine mythology

== See also ==
- Tan (disambiguation)
- Tanning (disambiguation)
- Tanin (disambiguation)
