= INS Tanin =

Tanin has been borne by three ships of the Israeli Navy and may refer to:

- INS Tanin (1958), an S-class submarine launched in 1945 as HMS Springer, she was transferred to Israel in 1958 and listed for disposal in 1972.
- INS Tanin (1976), a Gal-class submarine launched in 1976 and decommissioned in 2002.
- INS Tanin (2012), a Dolphin-class submarine launched in 2012
