= Tan =

Tan or TAN may refer to:

== Math ==
- Tangent function, a trigonometric function often referred to as tan.

== Arts and entertainment ==
- Tan, a 1989 album by the Polish rock band Kult
- "Tan", a 2026 song by the Scythe from the album Strictly 4 the Scythe
- TAN (group), South Korean boy band
- Tan (newspaper), a newspaper in Turkey
- Tan (weekly newspaper), a newspaper in Kosovo

== Businesses and organisations ==
- TAN Books, a Catholic publishing company
- FC Rubin-TAN Kazan, a Russian professional ice hockey club in Kazan in 1991-94
- Transportes Aéreos Nacionales or TAN Airlines, an airline based in Honduras
- Semitan or TAN, operates public transport in Nantes, France

== People ==
- Tan (surname) (譚), a Chinese surname
- Chen (surname) (陳), a Chinese surname, pronounced "Tan" in Min Nan languages
- Laozi, posthumous name "Tan" or "Dān" (聃), philosopher of ancient China
- Leborgne, nicknamed Tan, a patient of Paul Broca's, on whose autopsy he identified Broca's area
- Mika Tan (born 1977), an American model
- TAN (musician) (born 1990), Malaysian pop singer
- Tan Sağtürk (born 1969), Turkish ballet dancer
- Tan France (born 1983), British-American fashion designer

== Places ==
=== China ===
- Tan (state), an ancient viscountcy in eastern Shandong Province, China
- Tai'an railway station (Shandong), China Railway code TAN

=== Vietnam ===
- Tân An, Bắc Giang, a northeastern commune and village
- Tân An, the capital city of Long An Province, Mekong Delta
- Tân An province, a former province of South Vietnam

=== Elsewhere ===
- Tan Track or "The Tan", a running track in Royal Botanic Gardens, Melbourne, Australia
- Tanzania (IOC and FIFA trigram: TAN), a country
- Taunton Municipal Airport (IATA airport code: TAN), Massachusetts, US

== Science and technology ==
- Tan (color), a pale shade of brown
- Tanning (leather), the process of making leather from hides
- Tan (function), a trigonometric function
- Ti-6Al-7Nb, a titanium alloy containing aluminum and niobium
- Total acid number (TAN), the measure of a lubricant's or crude oil's acidity
- Transaction authentication number (TAN), in electronic banking
- Tumor-associated neutrophil

=== Biology ===
- Tan (goat pattern), a goat color pattern
- Tanbark or tan, the bark of certain species of tree
- Sun tanning, the darkening of skin in response to ultraviolet light
  - Sunless tanning, the darkening of skin without ultraviolet light
- Tropical ataxic neuropathy

== Other uses ==
- -tan, a Japanese honorific
- Tahn (Armenian թան tʻan), a yoghurt-based drink from the Middle East
- Tanfana or Tan, an ancient European goddess
- Tax Deduction and Collection Account Number (TAN), an Indian tax code

== See also ==
- Black and Tans, a nickname for British special constables during the Irish War of Independence
  - Irish War of Independence, sometimes called the "Black and Tan war" or "Tan war"
- Taan (disambiguation)
- Dan (disambiguation) (Tan is the older romanization of Dan in Chinese)
- Tannin (disambiguation)
- Tanning (disambiguation)
- TANS (disambiguation)
- Tanzhou (disambiguation), a Chinese placename "Tan District" or "Tan City"
