= Type 206 submarine =

German made submarine class

- Type 206A-class profile

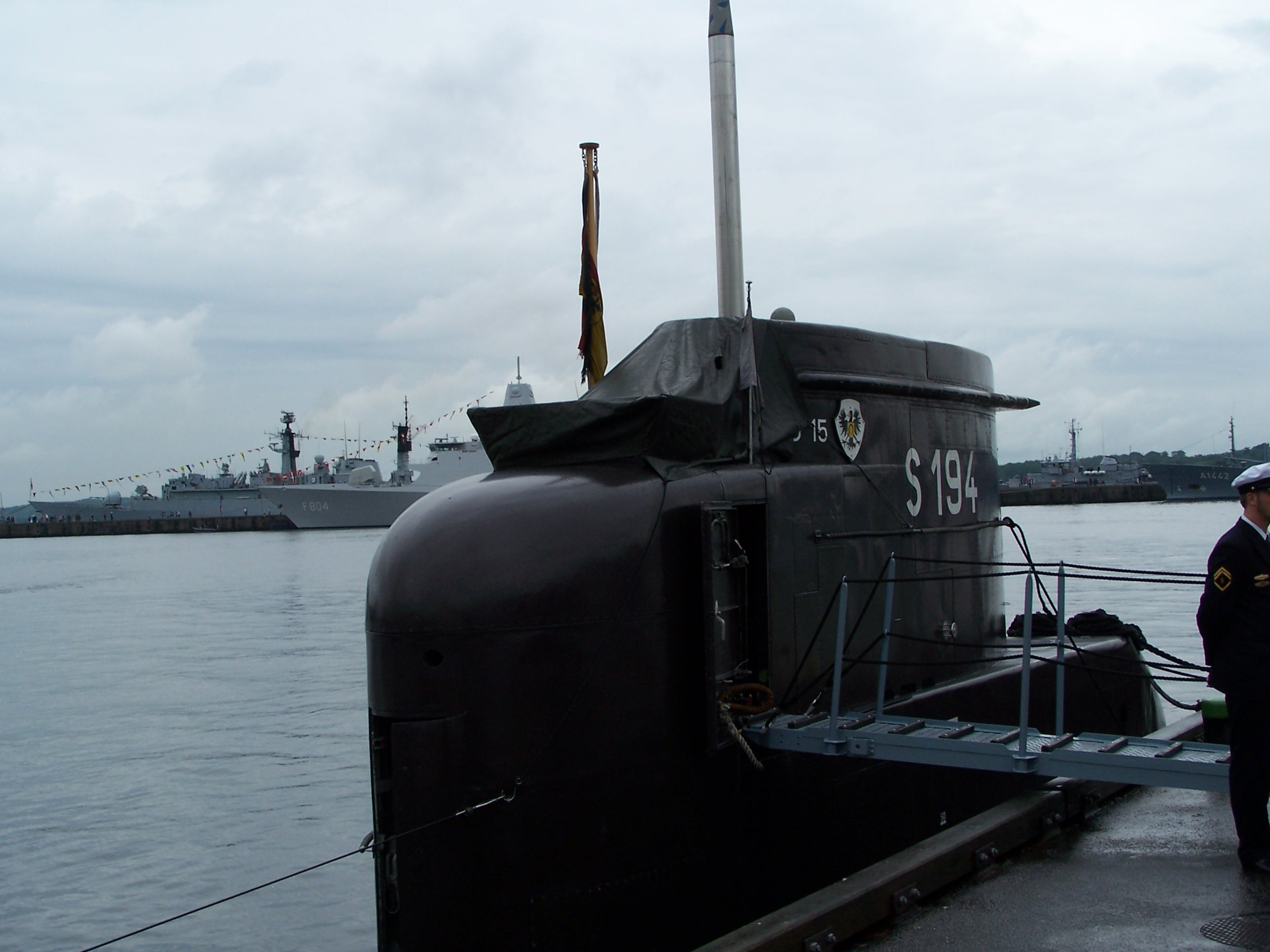
- U15 at Kiel Week 2007.

Class overview
- Builders: Howaldtswerke-Deutsche Werft; Nordseewerke
- Operators: German Navy; Colombian National Navy
- Preceded by: Type 205 submarine
- Succeeded by: Type 212 submarine, Type 209 submarine
- Subclasses: Gal-class submarine
- Built: 1969–1975
- In commission: 1973–2011 (Germany); 2012–present (Colombia)
- Completed: 18
- Active: 2
- Retired: 16
- Preserved: 1

General characteristics
- Type: Type 206A submarine
- Displacement: 456 tonnes (449 long tons), surfaced; 500 tonnes (490 long tons), submerged
- Length: 48.49 metres (159 ft 1 in)
- Beam: 4.58 metres (15 ft 0 in)
- Draft: 4.30 metres (14 ft 1 in)
- Installed power: 440 kilowatts (590 hp) (diesel); 1,100 kilowatts (1,500 hp) (electric)
- Propulsion: 2 MTU 12V 493, 4-stroke diesel engines, each coupled with an Asea Brown Boveri-generator; 1 Siemens-Schuckert-Werke electric motor driving single five (Type 206) or seven (Type 206A) blade propeller
- Speed: 10 knots (19 km/h; 12 mph), surfaced; 17 knots (31 km/h; 20 mph), submerged
- Range: 4,500 nautical miles (8,300 km; 5,200 mi) at 6 knots (11 km/h; 6.9 mph), surfaced; 228 nautical miles (422 km; 262 mi) at 4 knots (7.4 km/h; 4.6 mph), submerged
- Test depth: more than 200 m
- Complement: 22
- Sensors & processing systems: STN Atlas DBQS-21 (CSU83) submarine sonar; Thomson-CSF DUUX 2 passive rangefinder sonar; Safare VELOX sonar intercept; EDO-900 active mine avoidance sonar; Thomson-CSF Calypso II surveillance and navigation radar
- Electronic warfare & decoys: Thomson-CSF DR-2000U ESM system; Thorn-EMI SARIE
- Armament: 8 × 533 mm torpedo tubes, 8 DM2A1 Seeaal (206) or DM2A3 Seehecht (206A) torpedoes; 24 mines can be carried externally

The Type 206 is a class of German diesel-electric submarines (U-boats) developed by Howaldtswerke-Deutsche Werft (HDW). Its design is based on the preceding Type 205 submarine class. These small and agile submarines were built during the Cold War to operate in the shallow Baltic Sea and attack Warsaw Pact shipping in the event of military confrontation. The pressure hulls were built out of non-magnetic steel to counter the threat of magnetic naval mines and make detection with MAD sensors more difficult. The low emission profile allowed the submarines in exercises to intrude even into well-protected opposing forces such as carrier formations with their screen.

== Programme ==
Ten Type 205 submarines were constructed between 1962 and 1968 with hulls constructed of a new non-magnetic steel. The early boats, however, suffered from cracking due to stress corrosion and an urgent programme was initiated to develop a new steel which overcame these problems, which received much publicity at the time. The new high-strength, non-magnetic, austenitic steel has greater elasticity and good dynamic strength, and has proved very satisfactory in service, thoroughly overcoming the doubts that were raised by those early problems, although it has never been selected by IKL's many export customers and thus remains unique to German Navy submarines. Subsequently, the Type 206 was designed by Ingenieur Kontor Lübeck (IKL) in 1964–65 and a production order was placed on 7 June 1969 for eight from HDW in Kiel and ten from Nordseewerke in Emden.

Of the 18 submarines built for the Bundesmarine (West German Navy), 12 were modernized in the early 1990s and were re-designated as Type 206A; the others have been decommissioned. The current German Navy is starting to decommission some 206A vessels, with more of the new Type 212 submarines being commissioned. In June 2010 the Ministry of Defence announced that all six remaining vessels were to be retired from active service immediately and to be decommissioned by the end of 2010 to cut costs. There are no type 206 submarines left in active service with the German Navy.

A slightly modified variant of the Type 206 (which includes the distinctive dome, or bulge, in the front of the boat), the Gal-class submarine for the Israeli Navy was built to Israeli specifications as the Vickers Type 540 in the UK rather than Germany for political reasons. Three such boats were built, the first being commissioned in 1976. When the Israeli navy received its new Dolphin-class submarines (also built by HDW), the Gals were retired. As of 2006, one had been scrapped and two had been sent to HDW in an attempt to find a buyer for them. When no buyer was found, one of the submarines was returned to Israel for display in the Clandestine Immigration and Naval Museum.

== Modernisation ==
A major mid-life modernisation was conducted on twelve of these submarines, the boats concerned now being officially designated Type 206A. The work started in mid-1987 and completed in February 1992, being carried out by Nordseewerke, Emden; this upgrade includes:

The STN Atlas DBQS-21D sonar has been fitted, together with new periscopes, and a new weapon control system (LEWA). The ESM system has been replaced and GPS navigation installed. The rebuilt submarines are armed with new torpedoes (Seehecht), the propulsion system has been comprehensively refurbished, and improvements have been made to the accommodation.

== List of units ==
Pennant number	Name	Call sign	Laid down	Launched	Commis- sioned	Decommis- sioned	Fate
S192	U13	DRDG	15 Nov 1969	28 Sep 1971	19 Apr 1973	26 Mar 1997	was to be sold to Indonesia as KRI Nagarangsang (403), scrapped
S193	U14	DRDH	1 Mar 1970	1 Feb 1972	19 Apr 1973	26 Mar 1997	was to be sold to Indonesia as KRI Nagabanda (404), scrapped
S194	U15	DRDI	1 Jun 1970	15 Jun 1972	17 Jul 1974	14 Dec 2010	Was to be preserved at the Technik Museum Sinsheim, but was dropped in favor of U17; scrapped in 2023
S195	U16	DRDJ	1 Nov 1970	29 Aug 1972	9 Nov 1973	3 Mar 2011	Sold to Colombia for spare parts; scrapped at Kiel in 2022
S196	U17	DRDK	1 Oct 1970	10 Oct 1972	28 Nov 1973	14 Dec 2010	Preserved as a museum ship at the Technik Museum Sinsheim
S197	U18	DRDL	1 Apr 1971	31 Oct 1972	19 Dec 1973	3 Mar 2011	Sold to Colombia for spare parts; apparently scrapped in 2022
S198	U19	DRDM	5 Jan 1971	15 Dec 1972	9 Nov 1973	23 Aug 1998	was to be sold to Indonesia as KRI Bramastra (405), scrapped
S199	U20	DRDN	3 Sep 1971	16 Jan 1973	24 May 1974	26 Sep 1996	was to be sold to Indonesia as KRI Aluguro (407), scrapped
S170	U21	DRDO	15 Apr 1971	9 Mar 1973	16 Aug 1974	3 Jun 1998	was to be sold to Indonesia as KRI Cundamani (406), scrapped
S171	U22	DRDP	18 Nov 1971	27 Mar 1973	26 Jul 1974	18 Dec 2008	Scrapped
S172	U23	DRDQ	5 Mar 1972	25 May 1974	2 May 1975	3 Mar 2011	Sold to Colombia as ARC Intrépido
S173	U24	DRDR	20 Mar 1972	26 Jun 1973	16 Oct 1974	31 Mar 2011	Sold to Colombia as ARC Indomable
S174	U25	DRDS	1 Jul 1971	23 May 1973	14 Jun 1974	31 Jan 2008	Scrapped
S175	U26	DRDT	14 Jul 1972	20 Nov 1973	13 Mar 1975	9 Nov 2005	Scrapped
S176	U27	DRDU	1 Oct 1971	21 Aug 1973	16 Oct 1974	13 Jun 1996	Scrapped
S177	U28	DRDV	4 Oct 1972	22 Jan 1974	18 Dec 1974	30 Jun 2004	Scrapped
S178	U29	DRDW	10 Jan 1972	5 Nov 1973	27 Nov 1974	31 Dec 2006	Scrapped
S179	U30	DRDX	5 Dec 1972	4 Apr 1974	13 Mar 1975	31 Jan 2007	Scrapped

Notes:

- After its decommissioning, U21 had an ever-changing history: First it should have been sold to Indonesia as Cundamani. These plans were abandoned and U21 would have been scrapped in Itzehoe, had HDW not taken it on for a planned company museum in Kiel. This museum did not materialise, and U21 was gifted to the city of Eckernförde and towed there. For a short time it operated as a tourist attraction/technology museum, but because of local politics it was sold for scrap and broken up.
- U13, U14, U19 and U20 were also to be sold to Indonesia. Their names would have been Nagarangsang, Nagabanda, Bramastra and Alugoro.
- February/March 2010 the U26, U28 and U30 were towed by Polish tug Ikar to 's-Gravendeel, Netherlands to be scrapped.
- U17 and U26 visited New York City for Fleet Week in 1992.

== Exports ==
The Indonesian Navy intended to acquire five Type 206 submarines in 1997 to supplement its submarine fleet, then consisted of two Cakra-class (Type 209/1300) submarines. On 25 September 1997, Indonesian Navy has taken over two Type 206 submarines and planned to refit them, to be followed by three other submarines. Then in June 1998 Indonesia was running out of funds and the procurement program was cancelled. The vessels were already assigned with names and pennant numbers by the Indonesian Navy by the time it was cancelled.

The Colombian Navy purchased four decommissioned Type 206A submarines to boost its submarine force. Two submarines, named Intrépido (ex-U23) and Indomable (ex-U24) were commissioned into the Colombian Navy on 28 August 2012. Two submarines (ex-U16 and ex-U18) were acquired to be cannibalized for spare parts. On 5 December 2015, Intrépido and Indomable entered active service after a lengthy refit in Germany.

== Gallery ==
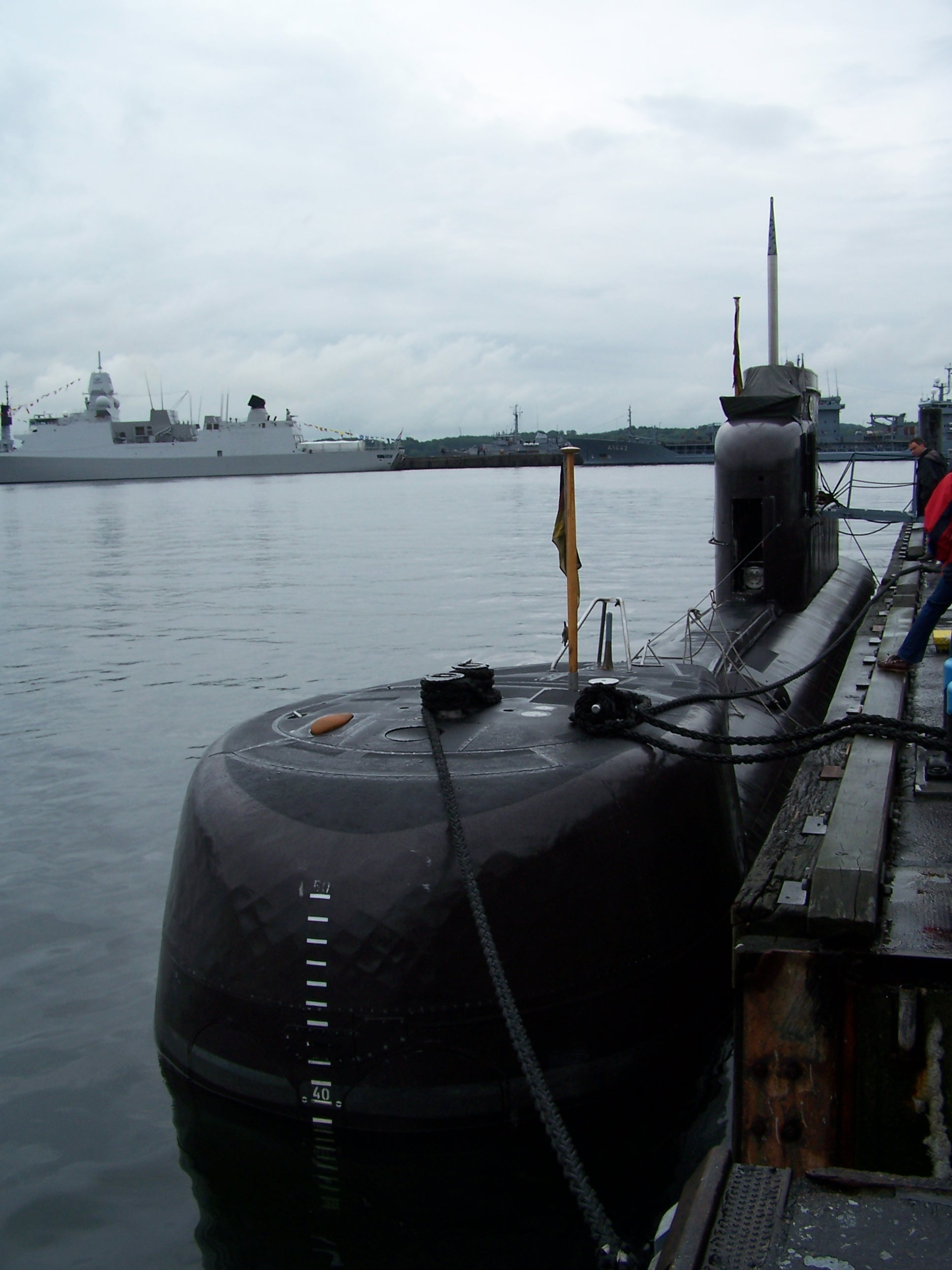
U15 of the German Navy

U22 of the German Navy on a special forces exercise

== See also ==
Equivalent submarines of the same era

- Heroj class
- Albacora class
- Toti class
- Natsushio class

== Bibliography ==
- Karr, Hans (2014). Deutsche Uboote seit 1956 (in German). Stuttgart: Motorbuch. ISBN 9783613037083.
