= Tanning =

Tanning may refer to:

- Tanning (leather), treating animal skins to produce leather
- Sun tanning, using the sun to darken pale skin
  - Indoor tanning, the use of artificial light in place of the sun
  - Sunless tanning, application of a stain or dye to the skin (active ingredient in tanning lotion products is dihydroxyacetone (DHA)).
- Physical punishment, metaphorically, such as a severe spanking which leaves clear marks

== See also ==
- Skin whitening
- Tan (color)
- Tan (disambiguation)
- Tannery (disambiguation)
- Tannin (disambiguation)
