= P264 =

P264 may refer to:

- HMS Archer (P264), a ship of the Royal Navy
- HMS Springer (P264), a submarine of the Royal Navy
