= Tanin =

Tanin may refer to:

- Tanin gas field, a natural gas field off the coast of Israel
- Tanin Industrial Company, a defunct Thai home appliance company
- Tanin (newspaper), a Turkish newspaper
- INS Tanin (S71) (formerly HMS Springer), an S-class submarine formerly commissioned to the Israeli Navy
- INS Tanin, a Dolphin-class submarine commissioned in 2014 to the Israeli Navy

== See also ==
- Tannin
