= Habilitation (disambiguation) =

Habilitation may refer to:

- Habilitation (human development), a process to help a person learn, keep, or improve skills and functional abilities not developing normally
- Habilitation, a qualification for university teaching or for leading research and supervising other researchers in some countries
