= Massachusetts Route 120 =

State highway in Bristol County, Massachusetts, US

Route 120
- Map of Bristol County in southeastern Massachusetts with Route 120 highlighted in red

Route information
- Maintained by MassDOT
- Length: 2.320 mi (3.734 km)

Major junctions
- West end: Route 120 at the Rhode Island state line in North Attleborough
- East end: US 1 in North Attleborough

Location
- Country: United States
- State: Massachusetts
- Counties: Bristol

Highway system
- Massachusetts State Highway System; Interstate; US; State
← Route 119	→ Route 121

Route 120 is a state highway in the U.S. state of Massachusetts. The highway runs 2.32 miles (3.73 km) from the Rhode Island state line east to U.S. Route 1 (US 1) within North Attleborough in western Bristol County. Route 120 connects North Attleborough with Cumberland, Rhode Island.

== Route description ==
Route 120 begins at the Rhode Island state line in the town of North Attleborough. The highway continues west as Rhode Island Route 120 into the town of Cumberland. The route heads east as two-lane Hickory Road, which crosses the Sevenmile River. Route 120's name changes to Hoppin Hill Road at the town road of that name, then it crosses the Hoppin Hill Reservoir. The highway reaches its eastern terminus at a four-way intersection with South Washington Street and East Washington Street south of downtown North Attleborough. US 1 heads south on South Washington Street and northeast on East Washington Street to bypass the town center, and South Washington Street north of the intersection is a town road through the town center.

== Major intersections ==
The entire route is in North Attleborough, Bristol County.

mi	km	Destinations	Notes
0.00	0.00	Route 120 west – Cumberland	Continuation into Rhode Island
2.32	3.73	US 1 (Washington Street) – Boston, Attleboro, Providence, RI	Eastern terminus
1.000 mi = 1.609 km; 1.000 km = 0.621 mi
