= Sevenmile River (Tenmile River tributary) =

River in Massachusetts and Rhode Island, United States

Coordinates: 41.89593°N 71.33978°W

The Sevenmile River or Seven Mile River is a river which flows through U.S. states of Massachusetts and Rhode Island. It flows approximately 9.8 miles (15.8 km).

== Course ==
The river begins in Plainville, Massachusetts at an unnamed pond along Peck Road, near the town line with North Attleborough. From its source, it flows roughly due south through North Attleborough and Attleborough, then into Pawtucket, Rhode Island where it flows into the Ten Mile River.

== Crossings ==
Below is a list of all crossings over the Sevenmile River. The list starts at the headwaters and goes downstream.

- North Attleborough
  - High Street
  - Metcalf Road
  - Hoppin Hill Avenue (MA 120)
  - South Washington Street (U.S. 1)
  - Draper Avenue
  - Interstate 295
  - Old Post Road
- Attleboro
  - West Street (MA 123)
  - Read Street
  - Roy Avenue
  - Pitas Avenue
  - Interstate 95
  - County Street

== Tributaries ==
- Hoppin Hill Brook
- Four Mile Brook
- Two Mile Brook
- Tannery River
- Sweedens Swamp Brook

== See also ==
- List of rivers in Massachusetts
- List of rivers in Rhode Island
- Ten Mile River (Seekonk River)
