= Rahab (disambiguation) =

Rahab is a prominent character in the Book of Joshua. It is a girl's name but now rare.

Rahab may also refer to:

- Rahab (term), a Hebrew term meaning:
  - A Hebrew term meaning spacious place or rage, fierceness, insolence, pride.
  - A mythical sea monster mentioned in the Book of Psalms and elsewhere.
  - A poetic term for Egypt.
- Rahab (Legacy of Kain), a video game character.

== See also ==
- Rehab (disambiguation)
