= Rehabilitation =

Rehabilitation or Rehab may refer to:

== Health ==
- Rehabilitation (neuropsychology), therapy to regain or improve neurocognitive function that has been lost or diminished
- Rehabilitation hospital, hospitals devoted to the rehabilitation of patients with various medical conditions
- Drug rehabilitation, medical or psychotherapeutic treatment for dependency on substances such as alcohol and drugs
- Physical medicine and rehabilitation, a branch of medicine that aims to enhance and restore functional ability to those with physical impairments or disabilities
- Physical therapy, physical rehabilitation using mechanical force and movement
- Psychiatric rehabilitation, a branch of psychiatry dealing with restoration of mental health and life skills after mental illness
- Vision rehabilitation, rehabilitation to improve vision or low vision
- Vocational rehabilitation, process which enables persons with impairments or disabilities to maintain or return to employment or occupation
- Wildlife rehabilitation, treatment of injured wildlife so they can be returned to the wild

== Music ==
- Rehab (band), a rock band from Georgia, US
- Rehab (Lecrae album), 2010 Christian hip hop album
- Rehab (Quiet Riot album), 2006 heavy metal album
- "Rehab" (Amy Winehouse song), 2006 song from the album Back to Black
- "Rehab" (Rihanna song), 2007 song from the album Good Girl Gone Bad
- "Rehab", 2023 song by D4vd from the EP The Lost Petals
- "Rehab", a 1995 song by Down from the album NOLA
- The Rehab, a 2010 album by Young Buck

== People ==
- Rehab Bassam (born 1977), Egyptian blogger
- Rehab Nazzal, Palestinian-born multidisciplinary artist based in Canada
- R3hab (pronounced Rehab), Dutch DJ and record producer

== Other uses ==
- Rehab Group, an international not-for-profit organisation mainly active in Ireland and the United Kingdom
- Rehabilitation (penology), re-integration into society of a convicted person
- Political rehabilitation, the process by which a disgraced political actor is restored to public life
- Rehabilitation (Soviet), the restoration of a person who was criminally prosecuted without due basis
- "Rehab" (The Assistants episode), 2009 television episode
- Rehab (party), a weekly summer outdoor party in Las Vegas
- Rehab: Party at the Hard Rock Hotel, a reality TV show about the party
- El Rehab, a community within New Cairo, Egypt
- Land rehabilitation, the process of restoring land after some process has damaged it
- Rehabbing housing, see Renovation

== See also ==
- Corrections
- Habilitation (human development)
- Rahab (disambiguation)
- Prehabilitation
