= TANS =

TANS may refer to:

- TANS Perú, a defunct Peruvian airline
- Territorial Army Nursing Service, a British military nursing organisation which amalgamated into Queen Alexandra's Royal Army Nursing Corps
- Tabled variant asymmetric numeral systems (tANS), in asymmetric numeral systems

== See also ==
- Tan (disambiguation)
