= Prehabilitation =

Medical term

Animation of a physical therapist performing rehabilitation to improve hip mobility.

Preoperative rehabilitation, prehabilitation or prehab, is a form of healthcare intervention that takes place before a medical or surgical intervention with the aim to reduce side effects and complications, and enhance recovery. Multidisciplinary team involvement can range from physiotherapists, occupational therapists, respiratory therapists, doctors, pharmacologists, anesthesiologists, psychologists, psychiatrists and sports physiologists.

Prehab can be applied to surgical populations in oncology, cardiorespiratory, cardiovascular and orthopaedic settings. The intention is that increasing baseline fitness prior to surgery will allow for relatively higher fitness post-operatively. Prehabilitation interventions are tailored to the patient so that even those with high amounts of comorbidities can receive a positive outcome. Research evidence is mixed, but suggests that prehabilitation reduces hospital stays and therefore risk of hospital acquired infections such as pneumonia.

This article will go over the evaluation that would deem prehabilitation useful prior to surgical interventions, contraindications to receiving prehabilitation, and adverse effects. Additoinally, the article will go over the current literature on the effects of prehabilitation prior to different surgical interventions and a general synopsis of the medical uses.

== Prehabilitation Evaluation ==
A physician can evaluate a patient based on a few metrics to determine their need for prehabilitation. The most important factor is the patient's ability to perform activities of daily living, which can mean asking the patient about their ability to make their own food, make phone calls, perform household chores, and take their medications. Their specific needs help to determine the prehabilitation approach. The provider may then recommend exercise, advice on nutrition, or referral to another provide to help with managing pain or anxiety.

== Contraindications ==
Absolute contraindications to prehabilitation have not been established. Studies suggest not delaying surgery when timing is critical for cancer survival. Exercise may be contraindicated if you have unstable cardiovascular, respiratory, infectious, musculoskeletal, ASA class 4 or above, or neurological conditions.

== Adverse Effects ==
In trials, the adverse effects with prehabilitation have been rare and minor. However, high-risk patients are usually excluded from research trials.

== Research ==
=== Prehabilitation: Colorectal Surgery ===
A 2013 pilot study of prehabilitation in colorectal surgery found improved postoperative functional recovery, measured in terms of the walking capacity at 4 weeks and 8 weeks. However, the time in hospital and post-operative complications were similar.

In 2026, a network meta-analysis was performed that compared exercise-only, nutrition-only, exercise+nutrition, and exercise+nutrition+psychological support versus usual care in 22 randomized control trials. The study primarily measured the distance walked after 6 minutes. Prehabilitation improved the 6-minute walking distance (exercise + nutrition + distance (exercise+nutrition+psychological walked the furthest). Although the study showed no significant effect on length of hospital stay, readmission to the hospital within 30 days, or adverse events. There was limited data on quality of life, anxiety, and depression.

In 2025, a systematic review and meta-analysis was performed measuring the effect of multimodal prehabilitation on length of hospital stay, complications, time to flatus (farting), readmissions, and ED visits predominantly studied in older men. The study showed shorter lengths of stays, about 25% fewer complications, and earlier return to flatus. The authors supported use of prehabilitation in older and high-risk patients. In this study the length of stay reduction was 0.52 days in randomized control trials versus 6.01 days in non-randomized control trials. The difference in these numbers may suggest the effects may be due to bias in the studies. Readmissions and ED visits did not change in this study.

=== Prehabilitation: Urological Surgery ===
According to a 2020 study looking at men awaiting surgery for urological cancer, high-intensity interval training (HIIT) may improve heart and lung fitness within a month before their surgery.

In 2022, a systematic and interdisciplinary review tested whether prehabilitation before urological cancer surgery was therapeutic. They ran a search through June 2020 and found 10 studies. Every study improved cardiorespiratory fitness, and 4 out of the 5 improved quality of life. Although, 8 out of the 10 studies were at high risk of bias. No trial reduced complications, mortality, length of stay, or readmission rates.

=== Prehabilitation: Orthopedic Surgery ===
Animation of total hip arthroplasty implant

According to recommendations from American Family Physicians, particularly in older adults, one of the greatest predictors of postoperative risk of death is related to falls. Those who have mobility limitations or who take medications associated with falls are at greatest risk. In those patients preparing to undergo surgery, if they participate in prehabilitation with physical therapy and exercise they are at lower risk of postoperative complications.

In 2023, a meta-analysis of 48 randomized control trials with 3,570 patients undergoing total knee replacements, total hip replacements, lumbar spine, or other orthopedic surgery compared undergoing prehabilitation versus normal care, with outcomes measured before and after surgery. Before surgery, the total knee replacement group had moderate improvement in function, knee flexing strength (knee bending strength), and the 6-minute walk test (the goal of this is to walk as far as possible in 6 minutes). The total hip replacement group had better abduction strength (strength of the muscles that move your leg out to the side away from your body) and a higher perceived quality of life before surgery. The lumbar spine group had less perceived back pain prior to surgery. After surgery, there was moderate improvement in function in the total knee replacement group compared to usual care for 6 weeks. The lumbar spine group had a moderate improvement in function compared to usual care for 6 months post-operatively. This study suggests a practical minimum dose of 4-6 weeks at 2 sessions per week. They recommend keeping it low risk with supervised and unsupervised programs. A limitation of the study is the postoperative evidence is inconsistent and low to very low certainty.

In 2023, a systematic review and meta-analysis of 28 randomized control trials was performed (23 of them were in joint replacement). The study tested preoperative exercise versus no formal program, with goal of measuring postoperative pain. The study found less pain at less than 2 months and 3-5 months. No post-op difference in pain at over 6 months. Quality of life and function were better at less than 2 months. Complication risk was also lower. Overall the study showed benefits for pain, function, quality of life, and complication risk, but the effects were limited and faded away over time.

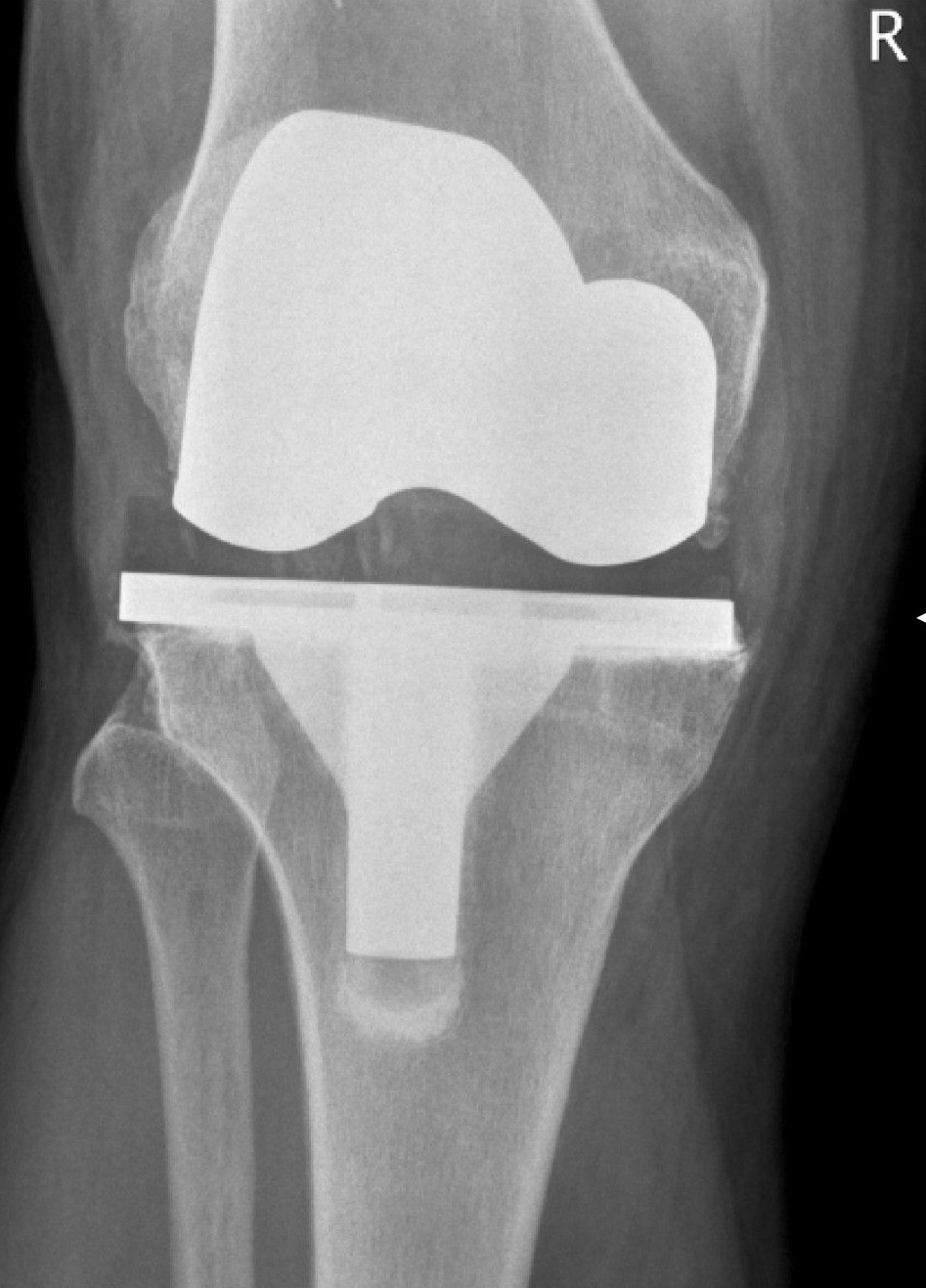
X-ray of total knee arthoplasty implant

In 2023, a systematic review of randomized control trials and adjusted nonrandomized studies from 2005 to 2021 was performed looking at benefits and harms of prehabilitation in total knee arthroplasty and total hip arthoplasty for those with osteoarthritis. In the total knee arthroplasty group, with 13 randomized control trials, the study showed possibly greater strength and length of surgery, with no added harm. However, pain, range of motion, and activities of daily living were similar(low strength of evidence). The total hip arthroplasty group, with only 6 randomized control trials, showed insufficient evidence. The study assessed harms specifically and found no safety sconcerns However, the exercise program varied too much to support strong conclusions.

In 2025, an overview of 3 systematic reviews and 21 meta-analyses, covering 1,110 total hip arthroplasty patients and 3,362 total knee arthroplasty patients, was performed assessing structured prehab with resistance training against those without strength training. The study found the strength training group to have fewer complications, better strength, better function, and better perceived quality of life. The effects were limited to the first 6 months. However, the study did not define the optimal dose, and the reviews ranged from low to moderate quality.

== Medical Uses ==
- Consistent Positives:
  - better preoperative status
  - less early preoperative pain
  - better early function postoperatively
  - possibly fewer complications.
- Consistent Limitations
  - low certainty
  - benefits fading by 6 months post-operatively
  - varied protocols
  - mixed results for total hip arthroplasty,
  - barriers to adherence and access

== See also ==
- Rehabilitation
