= Lotan =

Servant of the sea god Yam

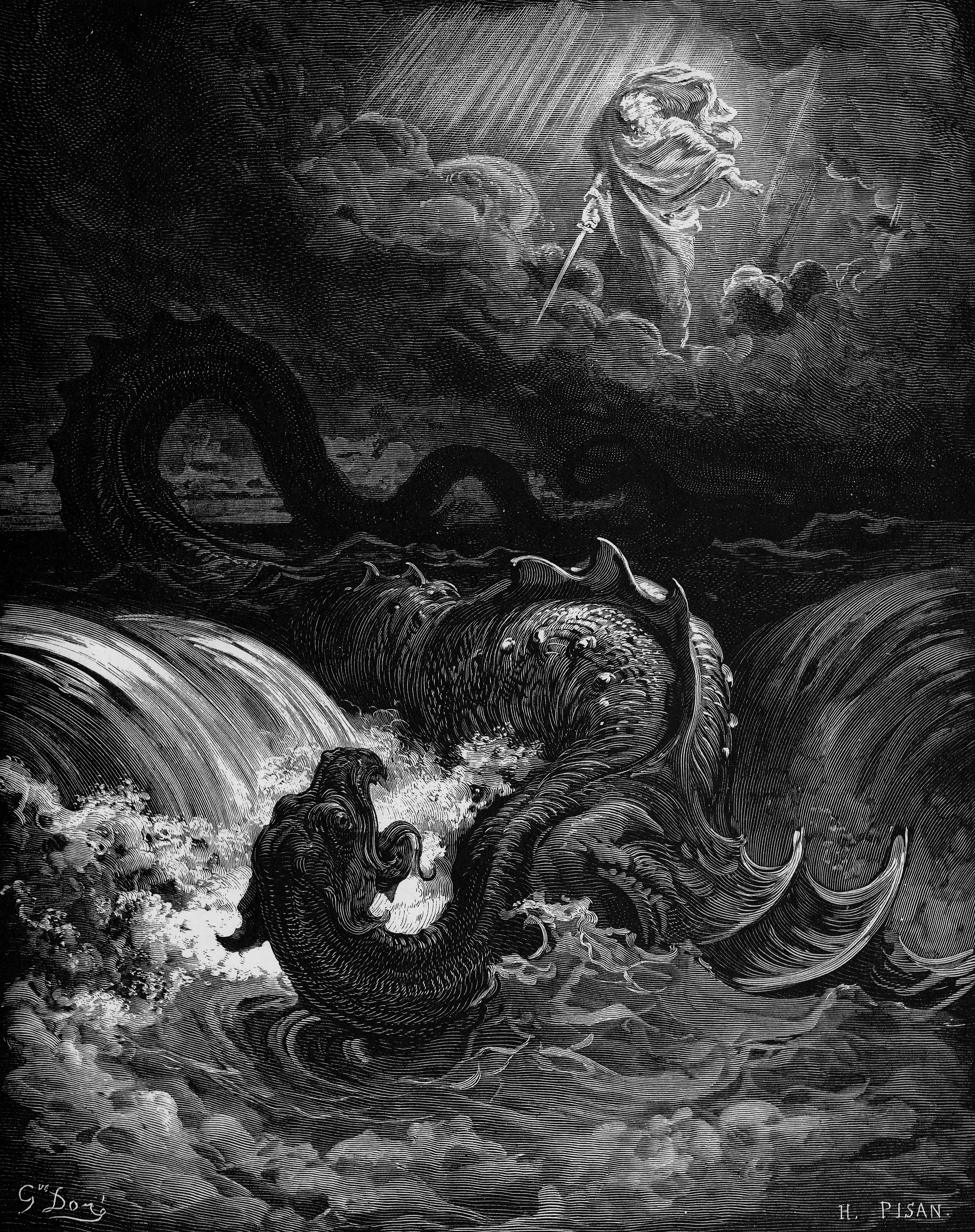
The Destruction of Leviathan by Gustave Doré (1865)

Lotan (Ugaritic: 𐎍𐎚𐎐 LTN, meaning "coiled"), also transliterated Lôtān, Litan, or Litānu, is a servant of the sea god Yam defeated by the storm god Hadad-Baʿal in the Ugaritic Baal Cycle. Lotan seems to have been prefigured by the serpent Têmtum represented in Syrian seals of the 18th–16th century BC, and finds a later reflex in the sea monster Leviathan, whose defeat at the hands of Yahweh is alluded to in the biblical Book of Job and in Isaiah 27:1. Lambert (2003) went as far as the claim that Isaiah 27:1 is a direct quote lifted from the Ugaritic text, correctly rendering Ugaritic bṯn "snake" as Hebrew nḥš "snake".

Lotan (ltn) is an adjectival formation meaning "coiled", here used as a proper name; the same creature has a number of possible epitheta, including "the fugitive serpent" (bṯn brḥ) and maybe (with some uncertainty deriving from manuscript lacunae) "the wriggling serpent" (bṯn ʿqltn) and "the mighty one with seven heads" (šlyṭ d.šbʿt rašm).

The myth of Hadad defeating Lotan, Yahweh defeating Leviathan, Marduk defeating Tiamat (etc.) in the mythologies of the Ancient Near East are classical examples of the Chaoskampf mytheme, also reflected in Zeus' slaying of Typhon in Greek mythology, Thor's struggle against Jörmungandr in the Gylfaginning portion of the Prose Edda, and the vedic battle between Indra and Vritra (from Sanskrit वृत्र, vṛtrá, meaning enveloper, cover and therefore obstacle) who is accused as a dragon of hoarding the waters and the rains, as a dasa of stealing cows, and as an anti-god of hiding the Sun, concentrating on Vritra several demonization processes, the pattern of good versus evil, darkness versus light (hiding the Sun), and comparisons to forces of nature and monsters whose tentacles span the earth.

The Litani River that winds through the Beqaa Valley in Lebanon is named after Lotan as the river was believed to be the personification of the god.

== See also ==
- List of dragons in mythology and folklore
- Tannin
- Rahab
- Apep

== Literature ==
- Barker, William D. (2014), "Litan in Ugarit", Isaiah's Kingship Polemic: An Exegetical Study in Isaiah 24–27, Tübingen: Mohr Siebeck, pp. 151–167, ISBN 978-3-16-153347-1.
- Baumgarten, Albert I. (1981), The Phoenician History of Philo of Byblos, Leiden: E.J. Brill, ISBN 90-04-06369-2.
- Herrmann, Wolfgang (1999), "Baal", Dictionary of Deities and Demons in the Bible, 2nd ed., Grand Rapids: Wm. B. Eerdmans Publishing, pp. 132–139.
- Ogden, Daniel (2013). Drakon: Dragon Myth and Serpent Cult in the Greek and Roman Worlds. Oxford University Press. p. 14. ISBN 978-0-19-955732-5.
- Uehlinger, C. (1999), "Leviathan", Dictionary of Deities and Demons in the Bible, 2nd ed., Grand Rapids: Wm. B. Eerdmans Publishing, pp. 511–515.
