= HMS Springer =

Submarine of the Royal Navy

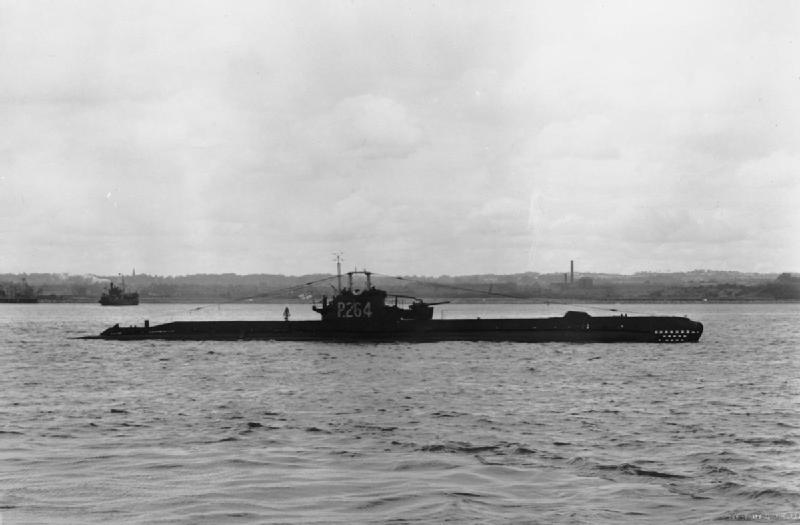
- HMS Springer

History

United Kingdom
- Name: HMS Springer
- Builder: Cammell Laird & Co Limited, Birkenhead
- Laid down: 8 May 1944
- Launched: 14 May 1945
- Commissioned: 2 August 1945
- Fate: Sold to Israeli Navy on 9 October 1958
- Badge

Israel
- Name: INS Tanin
- Acquired: 9 October 1958
- Honors and awards: Six-Day War Ribbon
- Fate: Listed for disposal, 1972

General characteristics
- Class & type: S-class submarine
- Displacement: 814-872 tons surfaced; 990 tons submerged
- Length: 217 ft (66 m)
- Beam: 23 ft 6 in (7.16 m)
- Draught: 11 ft (3.4 m)
- Speed: 14.75 knots surfaced; 8 knots submerged
- Complement: 48 officers and men
- Armament: 6 × forward 21 inch (533 mm) torpedo tubes, one aft; 13 torpedoes; one three-inch (76 mm) gun (QF 4-inch on later boats); one 20 mm cannon; three .303-calibre machine gun

HMS Springer was an S-class submarine of the Royal Navy, and part of the Third Group built of that class. She was built by Cammell Laird and launched on 14 May 1945. So far, she has been the only boat of the Royal Navy to bear the name Springer.

== History ==
=== Royal Navy Service ===
Built as the Second World War was drawing to a close, she did not see much action. In 1953, she took part in the Fleet Review to celebrate the Coronation of Queen Elizabeth II.

Silhouette of INS "Tanin"

=== Israeli Navy Service ===
The Springer was sold to the Israeli Navy in 1958 and renamed INS Tanin (Hebrew: תנין; Crocodile or Tannin).

==== Six Day War ====
Tanin was the only Israeli Submarine that was servicable at the outbreak of the Six-Day War, with the T Class submarine INS Leviathan on her delivery cruise, and took part in the war by launching naval commandos to attack the port of Alexandria. She then tried to torpedo an Egyptian sloop but was severely damaged by a depth charge counterattack. One source states that this was the reason that she was decommissioned after the war. The next day, the submarine returned to the port of Alexandria to pick the commandos up and extract them from Egypt. Her commander was awarded the Medal of Courage for his actions at the port of Alexandria. She received spare parts from her sister ship Rahav, formerly HMS Sanguine, when Rahav was retired in 1968. Tanin was listed for disposal in 1972.

A Gal-class submarine named Tanin served the Israeli Navy from 1977 to 2002, and the Dolphin-class submarine INS Tanin was delivered in May 2012.
