= Taan (disambiguation) =

Taan is a virtuosic technique used in North Indian classical vocal music. It may also refer to:

- Taan (film), a 2014 Indian Bengali-language film
- The Taan, a fictional race in the Sovereign Stone trilogy
- Daan District, Taipei, a district in Taiwan

== See also ==
- Tan (disambiguation)
