= Tannery (disambiguation) =

A tannery is a facility where the tanning process is applied to hide to produce leather.

Tannery may also refer to:

== Places ==
- Tannery Road, a road in the Bangalore Cantonment, India
- The Tannery, Ontario, a community in the town of Mississippi Mills
- Tannery, West Virginia, an unincorporated community, United States of America
- Tannery Brook, a tributary of the Mohawk River in North Western, New York, United States of America
- Tannery River, a river in North Attleboro and Attleboro, Massachusetts, United States of America
- The Tannery (Bethlehem, Pennsylvania), a historic building in Pennsylvania, United States of America
- Tannery Falls, Michigan, United States of America

== People ==
- Jules Tannery (1848–1910), French mathematician
- Paul Tannery (1843–1904), French mathematician and historian of mathematics

== Other uses ==
- The Tannery, a 2009 crime novel by Sherrie Hewson
- The Tannery (New Zealand), a boutique mall in Christchurch developed post the 2011 earthquake
