= Tannin (mythology) =

Sea monster in Canaanite, Phoenician, and Hebrew Faiths

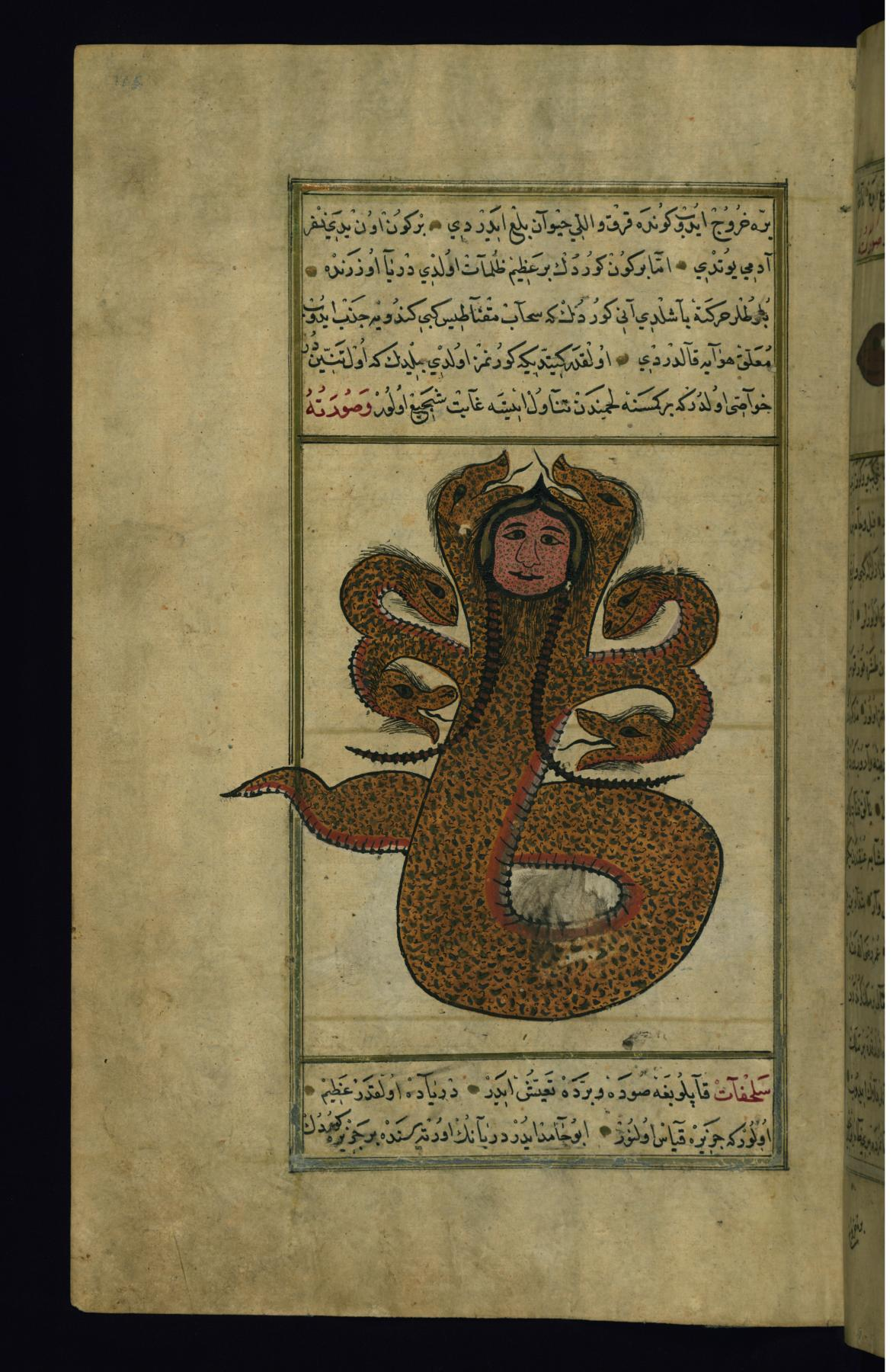
The Tannin (Dragon), by al-Qazwini (1203–1283).

Tannin (Hebrew: תַּנִּין tannīn; Syriac: ܬܢܝܢܐ tannīnā plural: tannīnē; Arabic: التنين tinnīn, ultimately from Akkadian 𒆗𒉌𒈾 dannina) or Tunnanu (Ugaritic: 𐎚𐎐𐎐 tnn, likely vocalized tunnanu) was a sea monster in Canaanite and Hebrew mythology used as a symbol of chaos and evil.

== Canaanite mythology ==
Tannin appears in the Baal Cycle as one of the servants of Yam (lit. 'Sea') defeated by Baʿal (lit. 'Lord') or bound by his sister, Anat. He is usually depicted as serpentine, possibly with a double tail.

== Hebrew mythology ==
The tanninim (תַּנִּינִים) also appear in the Hebrew Bible's Book of Genesis, Exodus, Deuteronomy, Psalms, (Note: Ps. 74:13, 91:13, 148:7, and possibly 44:20.) Job, Ezekiel, Isaiah, and Jeremiah. They are explicitly listed among the creatures created by God on the fifth day of the Genesis creation narrative, translated in the King James Version as "great whales". The tannin is listed in the apocalypse of Isaiah as among the sea beasts to be slain by Yahweh "on that day", translated in the King James Version as "the dragon". (Note: This passage in Isaiah directly parallels another from the earlier Baal Cycle. The Hebrew passage describing the tannin takes the place of a Ugaritic one describing "the encircler" or "the mighty one with seven heads" (šlyṭ d.šbʿt rašm). In both the Ugaritic and Hebrew texts, it is debatable whether three figures are being described or whether the others are epithets of Lotan or Leviathan.)

In Judaism, tannin is the term used for sea monsters such as Leviathan and Rahab. Along with Rahab, "Tannin" was a name applied to ancient Egypt after the Exodus to Canaan.

The word Tannin is used in the Hebrew Bible fourteen times. Aaron's staff becomes Tannin in the Book of Exodus (Exodus 7:9-12), it is used in the meaning "snake" in the Book of Deuteronomy (Deut 32:33) and Psalms (Psalm 91:13). It represents Nebuchadnezzar II (the king of Babylon) in Jeremiah (Jeremiah 51:34) and Pharaoh in Ezekiel (Ezekiel 29:3, 32:2). In the Book of Job (Job 7:12) the protagonist questions God "Am I the sea or the sea dragon that you have set a guard over me?"

The name has subsequently been given to three submarines in the Israeli Navy: the first, an S-class submarine formerly known as HMS Springer, was in commission from 1958 until 1972. The second, a Gal-class submarine, was in commission from 1977 until 2002. The third INS Tanin is a Dolphin-class submarine in commission since 2014.

== Modern languages ==
In modern Hebrew usage, the word tanin (תנין) means crocodile. In Arabic, the word tinnīn (تنين) is used to mean "dragon".

== See also ==
- Chaoskampf
- Illuyanka
- Lotan
- Makara
