= Rhode Island Route 120 =

State highway in Providence County, Rhode Island, US

Route 120
- Nate Whipple Highway
- Route 120 highlighted in red

Route information
- Maintained by RIDOT
- Length: 4.3 mi (6.9 km)

Major junctions
- West end: Route 122 in Cumberland
- Route 114 in Cumberland
- East end: Route 120 in North Attleboro, MA

Location
- Country: United States
- State: Rhode Island
- Counties: Providence

Highway system
- Rhode Island Routes
← Route 118	→ Route 121

Route 120 is a numbered state highway running 4.2 miles (6.8 km) in the U.S. state of Rhode Island. It runs along the Nate Whipple Highway for its entire length. Its western terminus is at Route 122 in Cumberland and the eastern terminus is at the Massachusetts border where it continues as Massachusetts Route 120.

== Route description ==
Route 120 takes the following route through the State:

- Cumberland: 4.2 miles (6.8 km); Route 122 to Massachusetts State line at Route 120
  - Nate Whipple Highway

== Major intersections ==
The entire route is in Providence County.

Location	mi	km	Destinations	Notes
Cumberland Hill	0.0	0.0	Route 122 (Mendon Road)	Western terminus
Cumberland	2.6	4.2	Route 114 (Diamond Hill Road)	
Cumberland	2.9	4.7	Abbott Run Valley Road	
Cumberland	4.3	6.9	Route 120 east – North Attleboro	Continuation into Massachusetts
1.000 mi = 1.609 km; 1.000 km = 0.621 mi

== Notes ==
Many maps erroneously show Route 120 extending west from Route 122 to Route 146. Signage very clearly shows this to be incorrect. The routing shown on most maps continues Route 120 north on Route 122 for about one block, then heading southwest on Manville Hill Road to Route 126, where it travels north with Route 126 to Sayles Hill Road, then southwest on Sayles Hill Road to Route 146.

Though Route 120 does not extend past Route 122, a state-maintained road continues past an interchange with Route 99 to Route 146.
