= Tanzhou =

Tanzhou may refer to:

- Tanzhou Town (坦洲镇), town in and subdivision of Zhongshan, Guangdong
- Changsha, formerly known as Tanzhou

== Historical prefectures ==
- Tan Prefecture (Hunan) (潭州), which existed between the 6th and 14th centuries in modern Hunan
- Tan Prefecture (Beijing) (檀州), which existed between the 6th and 14th centuries in modern Beijing

== See also ==
- Tan (disambiguation)
