= Tannery River =

River in Attleboro, Massachusetts, U.S.

Coordinates: 41.920°N 71.351°W

The Tannery River is a river in North Attleboro and Attleboro, Massachusetts. It is 4 miles (6 km) long and is a tributary of the Sevenmile River. There is one dam along its length.

== Course ==
The river begins as a series of small streams and swamps in North Attleboro, between Emerald Mall to the east and the Cumberland, Rhode Island border to the west. From there it flows south, picks up flow from Benjamin's Brook and crosses the border into Attleboro. There it receives Como Brook before reaching the Sevenmile River just north of the Rhode Island border.

== Tributaries ==
Red Rock Brook and Como Brook are the only tributaries, though it has several streams that also feed it.
