= TAN (musician) =

Malaysian singer and songwriter

Tan Yang Peng, professionally known as TAN (born November 26, 1990), is a Malaysian pop singer and songwriter from Penang, Malaysia.

== Early life ==
In 2001, Tan was the season one Top 8 finalist of the Astro reality competition “Astro Kids Talent Quest." In 2008, he became interested in Recording Arts and pursued a certificate program under the Full Sail / Hits Studio in Penang, Malaysia. In 2009, he completed a Songwriting and Guitar Performance certificate program at Berklee College of Music Online Extension. He is also a vocal graduate of the Musicians Institute in Hollywood.

== A Summer to Remember EP ==
On December 4, 2013, Tan released his debut single, "Heat Wave," which debuted on Malaysia's iTunes Top 100 Charts. The single was co-written and produced by American record producer Mario Marchetti. The music video was released on January 16, 2014, starring American actress and model Chelsea Heath and directed by Patrick “Embryo” Tapu.

On March 6, 2014, Tan released his debut EP, A Summer to Remember, produced by Mario Marchetti Amit Ofir of Abused Romance and mastered by Grammy winner Evren Göknar at Capitol Studios in Hollywood.

== Achievements ==
Music Connection listed TAN as one of the Hot 100 Live Unsigned Artists & Bands. In May 2015, he was the finalist of the International Songwriting Competition in the Pop/Top 40 Category and won the honorable mention award.
