= Habilitation (human development) =

Process of learning or developing skills not learned naturally or normally

Habilitation refers to the process that helps a person learn, keep, or improve skills and functional abilities that they may not have ever developed or are not developing normally, as expected at their age, such as a child who is not talking as expected for their age.

Habilitation contrasts with "Rehabilitation" as the latter relates to restoring earlier-existing skills or functioning, which currently stand lost maybe due to injury or illness or circumstances. Also, habilitation differs from rehabilitation as it is primarily aimed at helping children and youth with limitations learn new functional skills they have never been able to perform, while rehabilitation targets more adults as focusing more on regaining a previously held functional skill. A Swedish study on the implementation of World Health Organization's International Classification of Functioning, Disability and Health, version for Children and Youth (ICF-CY) in Swedish habilitation services found that the ICF-CY enhanced awareness of families' views too, which corresponded to organizational goals for habilitation services.

== Background ==
Habilitation and Rehabilitation are described primarily in relation to the field of health. However, the inter-relationships of recipients health to the other elements of daily living, including those related to employment, education, or simply life skills are recognised in the several international agreements formulated till-date to address the subject of "Rehabilitation" - like the International Labour Organization (ILO)'s Vocational Rehabilitation and Employment (Disabled Persons) Convention and the UN Standard Rules on the Equalization of Opportunities for Persons with Disabilities (the latter constituting as a precursor of the UN Convention on the Rights of Persons with Disabilities adopted in 2006).

The UN Convention on the Rights of Persons with Disabilities (CRPD) is the first such document which mentions both habilitation and rehabilitation distinctly (in Article 26).

The (CRPD) calls on States to "organize, strengthen and extend comprehensive habilitation and rehabilitation services and programmes, particularly in the areas of health, employment, education and social services." However, Article 2 (Definitions) of the convention does not include a definition of disability. The Convention adopts a social model of disability, but does not offer a specific definition. The convention's preamble (section e) explains that the Convention recognises:

...that disability is an evolving concept and that disability results from the interaction between persons with impairments and attitudinal and environmental barriers that hinders their full and effective participation in society on an equal basis with others

== Importance ==
Habilitation is distinctly separate from Rehabilitation - though the term Habilitation and (re)Habilitation can be considered complementing. A Russian Federal Law (No. 181-FZ - “On the social protection of disabled people in the Russian Federation (RF)”) describes rehabilitation and habilitation as aimed at eliminating or possibly more fully compensating for limitations in life activity.

The term "Habilitation" is considered relatively free of certain stereotypes associated with "Rehabilitation".

As per one author - "... human beings need habilitation and rehabilitation of various forms throughout their whole lifetimes; except intermittently, (as) we are not self-sufficient...".

== Vision habilitation ==
The most common use of the term habilitation is in the context of helping children with impaired vision. The term is most commonly used in the UK; in American English, vision habilitation is typically referred to as vision rehabilitation even when the impaired vision is congenital.

A habilitation specialist might help with mobility and orientation, as well as independent living skills.

== See also ==
- Rehabilitation - disambiguation page
- Occupational therapy
- Speech therapy
