= INS Rahav (2013) =

Israeli class of submarine

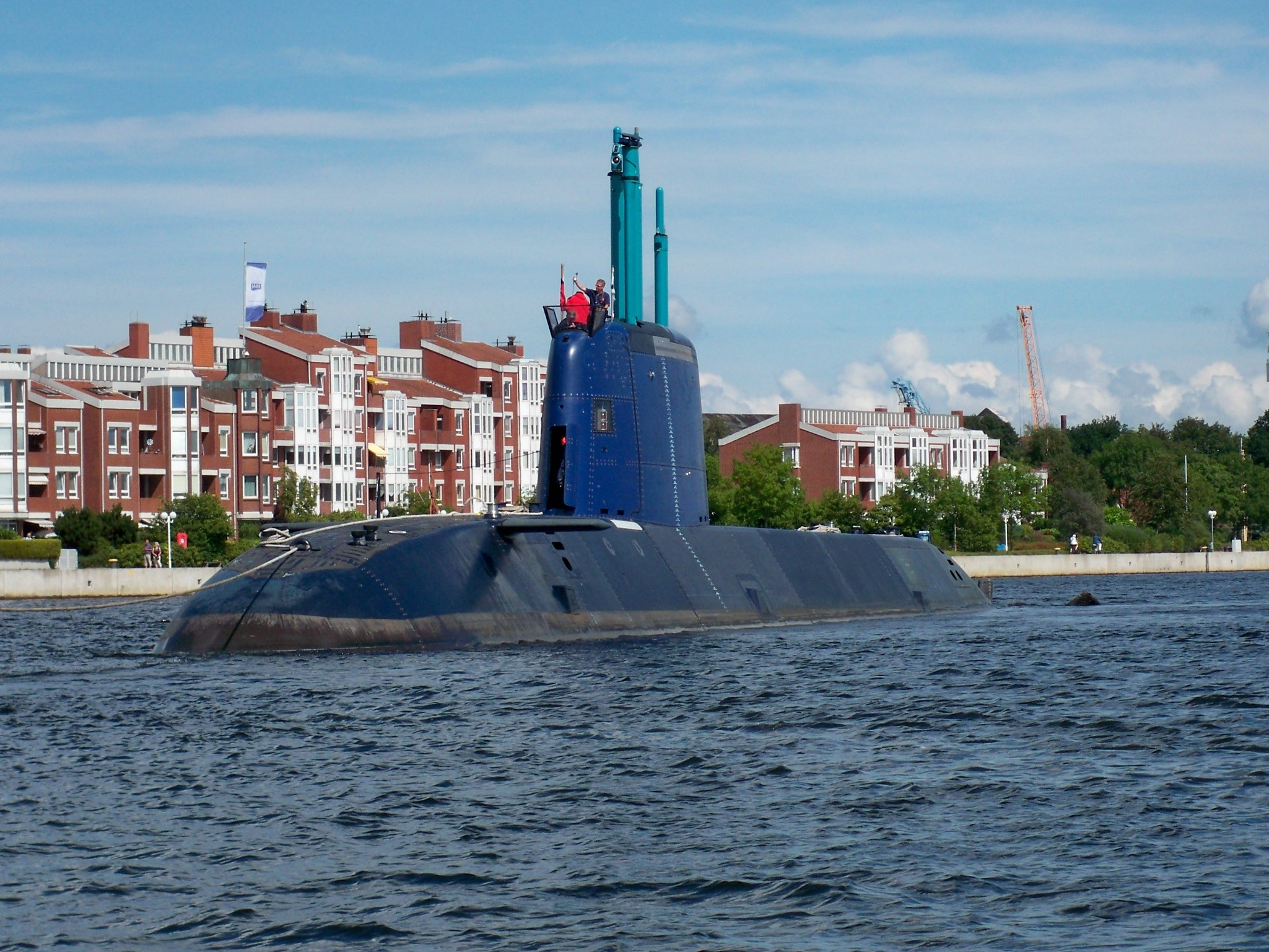

History

Israel
- Name: INS Rahav
- Ordered: 2005
- Builder: Howaldtswerke-Deutsche Werft (HDW)
- Cost: €650m
- Launched: 11 March 2013
- Commissioned: January 13, 2016
- Home port: Haifa
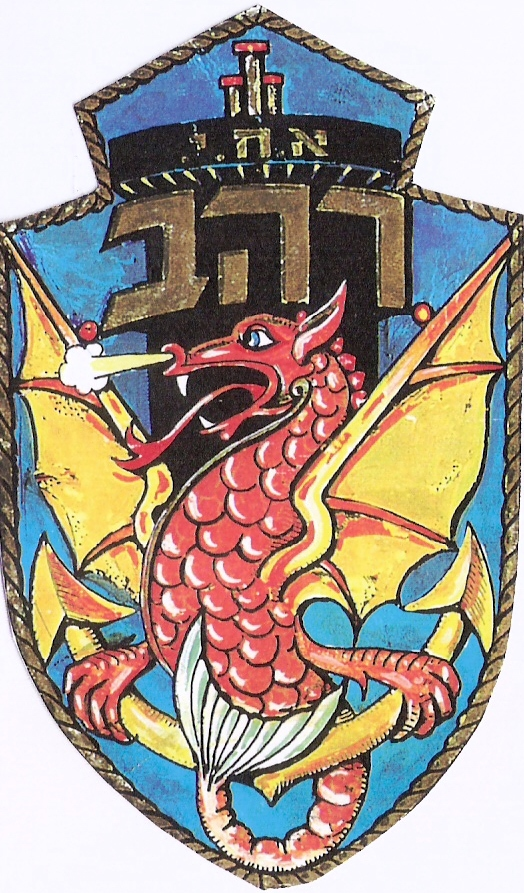
- Badge

General characteristics
- Class & type: Dolphin-class submarine
- Type: Diesel-electric submarine
- Displacement: 2,050 tons surfaced, 2,400 tons submerged
- Length: 68.6 m (225 ft)
- Beam: 6.8 m (22 ft)
- Draught: 6.2 m (20 ft)
- Propulsion: Diesel-electric, 3 diesels, 1 shaft, 4,243 shp (3,164 kW)
- Speed: excess of 25 knots (46 km/h; 29 mph)
- Test depth: At least 350 m (1,150 ft)
- Complement: 35 + 10 additional
- Sensors & processing systems: STN Atlas ISUS 90-55 combat system
- Armament: 6 × 533 mm (21.0 in) torpedo tubes; 4 × 650 mm (26 in) diameter torpedo tubes; DM-2A4 Seehake wire-guided torpedoes; UGM-84C Harpoon anti-ship missiles; Triton anti-helicopter missiles

INS Rahav is an Israeli Dolphin 2-class submarine of Shayetet 7 flotilla. The name is Hebrew for "Rahab." The submarine was built in Kiel, Germany, and delivered to the Israeli port city Haifa 12 January 2016, where entered service the next day.

The submarine is named after a biblical passage.
