= Dakar-class submarine =

Israeli Navy submarine class

Class overview
- Builders: ThyssenKrupp Marine Systems (TKMS)
- Operators: Israeli Navy
- Preceded by: Dolphin class
- Cost: EUR €3 billion (Total deal)
- In service: Expected to enter active service from 2031.
- Planned: 3

General characteristics
- Type: Attack submarine
- Length: 74 m (243 ft) estimated
- Propulsion: Diesel-electric propulsion; Air-independent propulsion (AIP)
- Armament: Submarine-launched ballistic missiles (SLBM), Anti-ship missiles (AShM)
- Notes: Planned to replace the first batch of three Dolphin-class submarines.

The Dakar-class submarine (Hebrew : הצוללות מסדרת דקר) is a class of AIP-capable, diesel-electric multipurpose attack submarines ordered by the Israeli Navy from German-based naval conglomerate ThyssenKrupp Marine Systems (TKMS).

The Dakar class features a new design compared to the Israeli Navy's currently-serving Dolphin-class submarines. It has been customized to fulfill the operational requirements of the Israeli Navy. The class was named in honor of INS Dakar, an Israeli submarine which mysteriously sank in 1968.

In January 2022, Israel's Ministry of Defense ordered three submarines as a replacement to the first batch of the Israeli Navy's Dolphin-class submarines; the first of the new submarines are slated to enter service within nine years.

== Overview ==
=== Design ===
Current details about the class' design are scant; however, it is understood that the submarines have been specifically engineered to fulfill the operational requirements of the Israeli Navy. According to a computer-generated rendering released by TKMS, the design of the Dakar class appears to be similar to the Dolphin-class submarines and the concept art of the Type 212CD submarine, currently being built for the German Navy and the Royal Norwegian Navy.

=== Distinctive features ===
- Inclusion of an enlarged sail along the hull; with regard to other conventionally-powered submarines, an enlarged sail is reportedly a rare feature. Several reasons suggested as the motive for the inclusion of the enlarged sail include:
  - Integration of an airlock for special operations.
  - Additional space for deploying unmanned underwater vehicles (UUV) or unmanned aerial vehicles (UAV).
  - Expansion of command-and-control facilities, for supporting various types of ISR capabilities.
  - Additional space for equipping submarine-launched ballistic missiles (SLBM).
- Inclusion of an "X-shaped" rudder configuration, similar to that of the Dolphin-class submarines; however, the Dakar-class design omits the smaller horizontal and vertical stabilizers – features which were present on the Dolphin class.
- Inclusion of a submarine screw configuration reminiscent to that of the Type 218SG submarine and the Type 216 submarine concept.

=== Armament ===
Current details about the armament of the Dakar class are scant; however, it is believed that apart from its torpedo tubes, the class' design may incorporate vertical launching system (VLS) cells, capable of firing submarine-launched ballistic missiles (SLBM), or submarine-launched cruise missiles (SLCM) – presumably equipped with nuclear warheads or surface-to-air missile (SAM).

=== Capabilities ===
Little is known about the class' designated capabilities, ostensibly due to Israel's tight control on information and confidentiality regarding its military assets, especially its submarine fleet. According to Benny Gantz, Israel's Minister of Defense, the Dakar-class submarines would "upgrade the capabilities of the Israeli Navy, and will contribute to Israel's security superiority in the region".

Concurrently, it is believed that the submarines may feature ballistic missiles, given the submarines' unusually long sail - presumably to accommodate VLS cells, although there is no indication that Israel has, or is currently developing an SLBM.

The suggestion that an enlarged sail may probably be used for housing nuclear-tipped missiles is very likely; for example, early-generations of Soviet-designed ballistic missile submarines, such as the Project 611 submarines, carried ballistic missiles in their sail. If true, the Dakar class would be the second class of conventionally-powered, air-independent propulsion (AIP)-equipped submarines capable of carrying and launching ballistic missiles; the first one is the KSS-III submarine operated by the Republic of Korea Navy, although it carries ballistic missiles in its hull, not in its sail.

Aside from the prospective use of ballistic missiles, the possibility of utilizing VLS cells in the sail for accommodating additional missiles – whose size may be too large to be launched from either the hull or from torpedo tubes – such as submarine-launched cruise missiles (SLCM), is also likely.

== History ==
In 2017, Israel and Germany signed a memorandum of understanding (MoU) to acquire three new submarines, as part of the Dolphin class, at a cost of US$1.5 billion. According to the deal, Germany agreed to subsidize up to 30% of the submarine's hull, mechanical and electrical costs.

In 2018, the Israeli Navy announced that the three future submarines were to be classified as the Dakar class, in honor of INS Dakar (Hebrew: אח"י דקר) - an ex-Royal Navy T-class submarine purchased by the Israeli Navy, which mysteriously sunk while being transferred to Israel in 1968.

On 20 January 2022, Israel's Ministry of Defense officially contracted TKMS to construct the three diesel-electric attack submarines, at a cost of EUR €3 billion. The three designated submarines are poised to replace the first batch of three Dolphin-class submarines, which were built in Germany and commissioned between 1999 and 2000. The deal also included the creation of a training simulator in Israel, and the supply of spare parts.

Reportedly, ThyssenKrupp invested €250 million into TKMS in 2019, in anticipation of the order - developing a new shipyard in Kiel to operate as a new centre of competence for submarine manufacturing capabilities, as well as the construction of a new shipbuilding hall and fuel-cell production site.

The deal for the three submarines - which was originally estimated to cost around €1.8 billion, has increased by a margin of €1.2 billion, to a total of €3 billion; the increase in the price is yet to be officially clarified. The German government, which agreed to subsidize €600 million into the deal, out of the original price of €1.8 billion, asserted that it would not raise its subsidy in proportion with the increase in price; as a result, the net cost to Israel will thus be twice as high, at €2.4 billion. However, the Ministry of Defense had approved the procurement of the three submarines at the inflated price, without the public or the Knesset - Israel's parliament, being notified.

The construction of the first ship started in November 2024, which will not be named Dakar.

== Boats in class ==
Name	No.	Builder	Contract	Status	Laid down	Launched	Comm.	Notes
Israeli Navy (3 ordered)
TBA	TBA	TKMS shipyard (ThyssenKrupp Marine Systems); Kiel, Germany	20 Jan 2022	Construction started (Nov 2024)	–	–	Early 2030s	–
TBA	TBA	TKMS shipyard (ThyssenKrupp Marine Systems); Kiel, Germany	20 Jan 2022	Ordered	–	–	–	
TBA	TBA	TKMS shipyard (ThyssenKrupp Marine Systems); Kiel, Germany	20 Jan 2022	Ordered	–	–	–	

Planned commissioning

== See also ==
- List of submarine classes in service

Equivalent submarines of the same era

- Type 212CD
- Project-75
- Orka class
- Atılay class
- Jang Yeongsil class
