= INS Tanin (2012) =

Israeli submarine

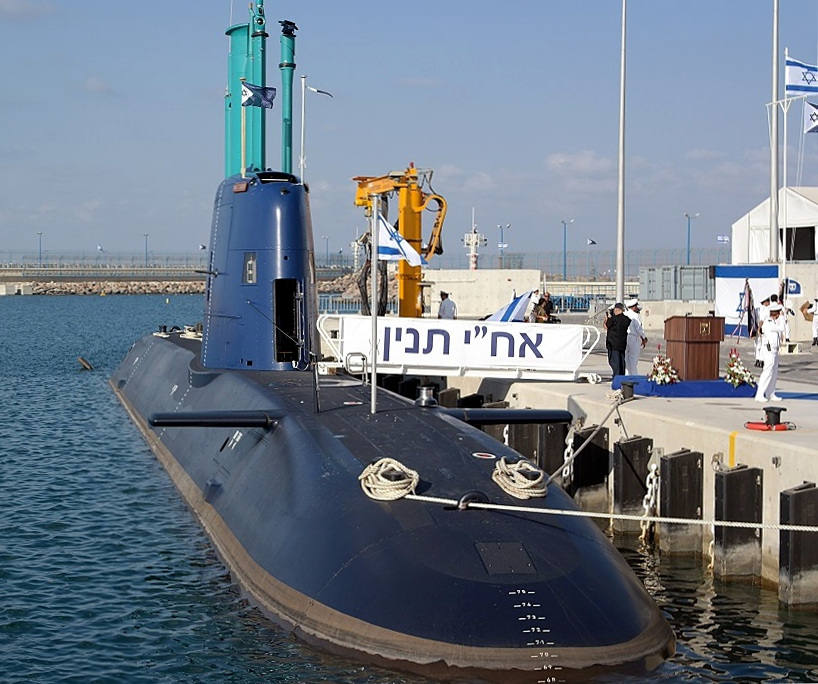

History

Israel
- Name: INS Tanin
- Ordered: 2005
- Builder: Howaldtswerke-Deutsche Werft (HDW)
- Cost: €650m
- Launched: February 2012
- Commissioned: September 23, 2014
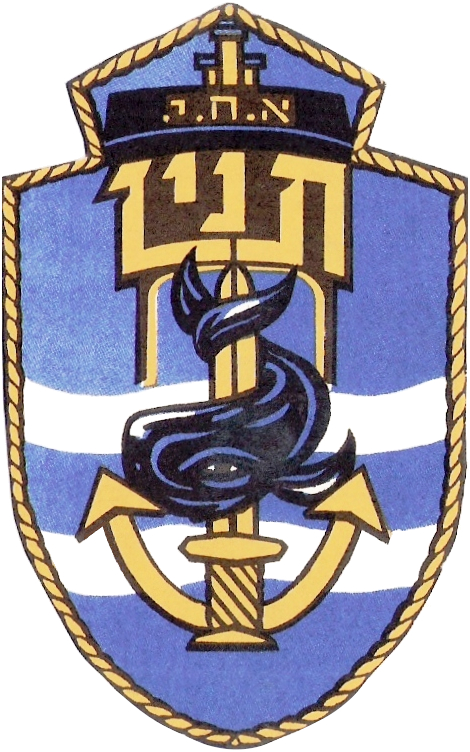
- Badge

General characteristics
- Class & type: Dolphin-class submarine
- Type: Diesel-electric submarine
- Displacement: 2,050 tons surfaced, 2,400 tons submerged
- Length: 68.6 m (225 ft) for Dolphin 2
- Beam: 6.8 m (22 ft)
- Draught: 6.2 m (20 ft)
- Propulsion: Diesel-electric, 3 diesels, 1 shaft, 4,243 shp (3,164 kW)
- Speed: excess of 25 knots (46 km/h; 29 mph)
- Test depth: At least 350 m (1,150 ft)
- Complement: 35 + 10 additional
- Sensors & processing systems: STN Atlas ISUS 90-55 combat system
- Armament: 6 × 533 mm (21.0 in) torpedo tubes; 4 × 650 mm (26 in) diameter torpedo tubes; DM-2A4 Seehake wire-guided torpedoes; UGM-84C Harpoon anti-ship missiles; Triton anti-helicopter missiles

INS Tanin is an Israeli Dolphin 2-class submarine of Shayetet 7 flotilla. The name means "crocodile" in modern Hebrew, but can also mean the sea monster "tannin". The submarine was launched in February 2012 in Kiel, Germany, and was delivered to the Israeli port city Haifa later that year, and entered service in 2014.
