= Rahab (mythology) =

Biblical Hebrew term

Rahab (Biblical Hebrew: רַהַב, romanized: Rahaḇ, lit. 'blusterer') is used in the Hebrew Bible to refer to a mythical sea monster, as well as an emblematic or poetic name for Egypt, for the sea, and for arrogance.

Raḥab or Rahav (Hebrew: רָחָב, romanized: raḥaḇ, lit. 'spacious place') is a term for the Abyss.

== Biblical usage ==
=== As primeval sea-monster ===
Rahab appears in Psalm 89:10, Isaiah 51:9–10, and Job 26:12. Rahab, in these passages, takes the meaning of primeval, chaotic, multi-headed sea-dragon or Leviathan. "Thou didst crush Rahab, as one that is slain; Thou didst scatter Thine enemies with the arm of Thy strength." Psalm 89:10

"Awake, awake, put on strength, O arm of the LORD; awake, as in the days of old, the generations of ancient times. Art thou not it that hewed Rahab in pieces, that pierced the dragon?" Isaiah 51:9–10

"He stirreth up the sea with His power, and by His understanding He smiteth through Rahab." Job 26:12

The Babylonians told of a sky-god, Marduk, and a sea-goddess, Tiamat, battling for supreme power over the other gods, in the Enūma Eliš. It has been speculated these two characters in the Babylonian myth are parallel to the creation stories found in the biblical passages containing the name Rahab. There is a possible connection between the monster Rahab and the fragmentary attested Akkadian chaos-dragon Labbu.

=== As insolence or pride ===
In Isaiah 30:7, rahav becomes a proverbial expression that alludes to insolence. "For Egypt helpeth in vain, and to no purpose; therefore have I called her arrogancy that sitteth still." Isaiah 30:7

In the Book of Job, rahav occurs in the Hebrew text and is translated in the King James Version as "proud". "If God will not withdraw his anger, the proud helpers do stoop under him." Job 9:13

=== Egypt ===
Rahab is a poetical name for Egypt. It might have Egyptian origins that were accommodated to the Hebrew language, although there is no relevant term in Coptic language.

I will make mention of Rahab and Babylon as among them that know Me; behold Philistia, and Tyre, with Ethiopia; this one was born there.

— Psalms 87:4

== Jewish folklore ==
In medieval Jewish folklore, Rahab is a mythical sea monster, a dragon of the waters, the "demonic angel of the sea". Rahab represents the primordial abyss, the water dragon of darkness and chaos, comparable to Leviathan and Tiamat. Rahab later became a particular demon, inhabitant of the sea, especially associated with the Red Sea.

== Modern culture ==
Rahab is the official Hebrew name for the planet Neptune in a vote organised by the Academy of the Hebrew Language in 2009.

Several Israel Navy submarines also bear the name, including the fifth Dolphin class submarine, which officially entered service in January, 2016: The INS Rahav.

In the video game Legacy of Kain: Soul Reaver, the boss character Rahab is a vampire who has evolved into a marine fish-like creature, possibly a reference to the mythic sea monster. The final boss of The Ocean Hunter is likewise a monstrous sea humanoid named Rahab.

== See also ==
- Chaoskampf
- Lotan
- Rahab (disambiguation)
- Yam (god)
