= Gal-class submarine =

Submarine class

- Gal-class profile

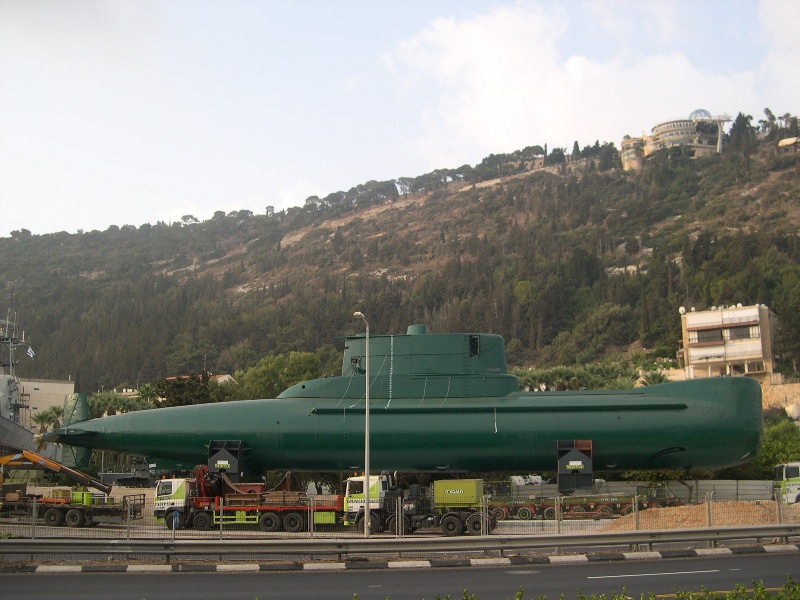
- INS Gal at the Naval Museum, Haifa

Class overview
- Builders: Vickers, Barrow
- Operators: Israeli Navy
- Preceded by: S class; T class
- Succeeded by: Dolphin class
- In commission: 1976-2002
- Planned: 3
- Completed: 3
- Retired: 3
- Preserved: 1

General characteristics
- Type: Submarine
- Displacement: 420 tonnes (Surfaced); 600 tonnes (Submerged)
- Length: 45 m (148 ft)
- Beam: 4.7 m (15 ft)
- Draught: 3.7 m (12 ft)
- Propulsion: 2 × MTU diesels 1200 hp & AEG Generators; 1 × electric motor 1800 hp; 1 shaft
- Speed: 11 knots (20 km/h; 13 mph) Surfaced; 17 kn (31 km/h; 20 mph) Submerged
- Complement: 32
- Sensors & processing systems: radar Plessey; Sonar Plessey,
- Electronic warfare & decoys: Classified
- Armament: 8 × 533mm Tubes bow; Sub-Harpoon Missiles, NT 37E torpedoes; SAM launcher (removed)

The Type 540 Gal-class submarine is a slightly modified variant of the German HDW Type 206 submarine class (which includes the distinctive dome, or bulge, in the front of the boat), modified for Israeli requirements. The Gal class submarines were built to Israeli specifications as the Vickers Type 540 at the Vickers shipyards in Barrow-in-Furness in the UK rather than Germany for political reasons. "Gal" (גל - Hebrew for "wave") was the name of the son of Abraham (Ivan) Dror, 3rd commander of the squadron and head of the project.

The Gal class of submarines were the first Israeli Navy submarines built to Israeli Navy specifications. They supplanted previous generations of submarines employed from 1958 by the Israeli navy which were refurbished and upgraded boats of the British S class and T class; submarines whose hull designs dated back to the decade before World War II.

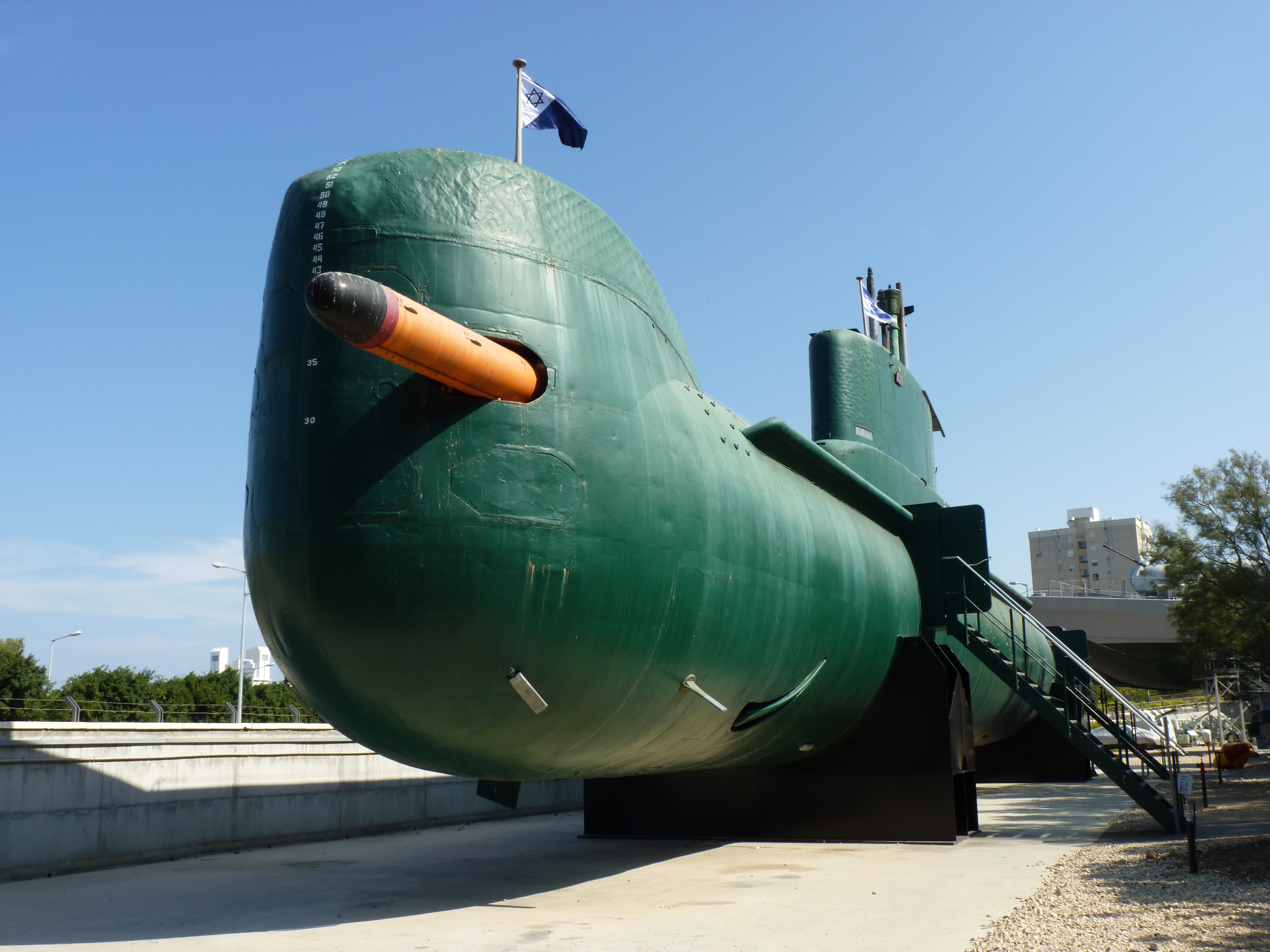
INS Gal on display at the Naval Museum, Haifa, showing entrances cut into hull

Since entering service in the late 1970s, these small but agile and sophisticated submarines were continuously upgraded with newer systems to maintain their technological edge. They were somewhat unusual in that all boats of the class were at one point equipped with six-tube retractable Blowpipe surface-to-air missile launchers controlled from inside the boat, though these were later removed. The Israeli newspaper Maariv reports that Gal-class submarines were active in the 1982 Lebanon War. During the war, a Gal-class submarine fired two torpedoes and sank a Lebanese refugee boat, killing 25 people on board. During 1983 torpedo tube launched Sub-Harpoon anti-ship missiles and associated fire control systems were added to all boats of the Gal class. NT 37E torpedoes were acquired to replace the older Mk 37 models in 1987–88. All extensively overhauled in 1994–95, including improved sensors and fire control system.

In the late 1990s, the Gal submarines were replaced with the new, much larger Dolphin-class submarines built by HDW in Germany. The Gal boats were decommissioned in the early 2000s. One was scrapped and two were sent to HDW in Germany in hopes of finding a foreign buyer. When none was found, in October 2007 Gal was shipped back to Haifa, Israel and is now on display in the Israeli Naval Museum. Some changes were made in the submarine to make it accessible to visitors, such as entrances cut into her port (left) side.

== Ships ==
The first ship commissioned was Gal in December 1976. It was damaged by grounding on her delivery voyage but was repaired. Gal is now on display at the Israeli Naval museum in Haifa.

The next two Gal-class submarines were named after their retired Israeli submarine predecessors of the retired British T class who themselves were named after two sea monsters mentioned in Isaiah 51:9:

"Awake, awake, put on strength, O arm of the Lord; awake as in the ancient days, In the generation of old! Art thou not it that hath cut Rahab (Rahav), and wounded the dragon? (in Hebrew, Tanin)" These names will also be placed on two boats of the Dolphin class.

Name	Builder	Launched	Commissioned	Status
Gal	Vickers, Barrow	2 December 1975	June 1976	decommissioned 2000, museum ship 2007
Tanin (ex-Gur)	Vickers, Barrow	25 October 1976	June 1977	decommissioned 2002
Rahav	Vickers, Barrow	8 May 1977	18 December 1977	decommissioned 1997

== Sources ==
- Conway's All the World's Fighting Ships 1947–1995
- http://www.submarines.dotan.net/gal/
- http://www.globalsecurity.org/military/world/israel/gal.htm
- http://www.dolphin.org.il
