= Dolphin-class submarine =

Israeli Navy submarine class

Dolphin-class
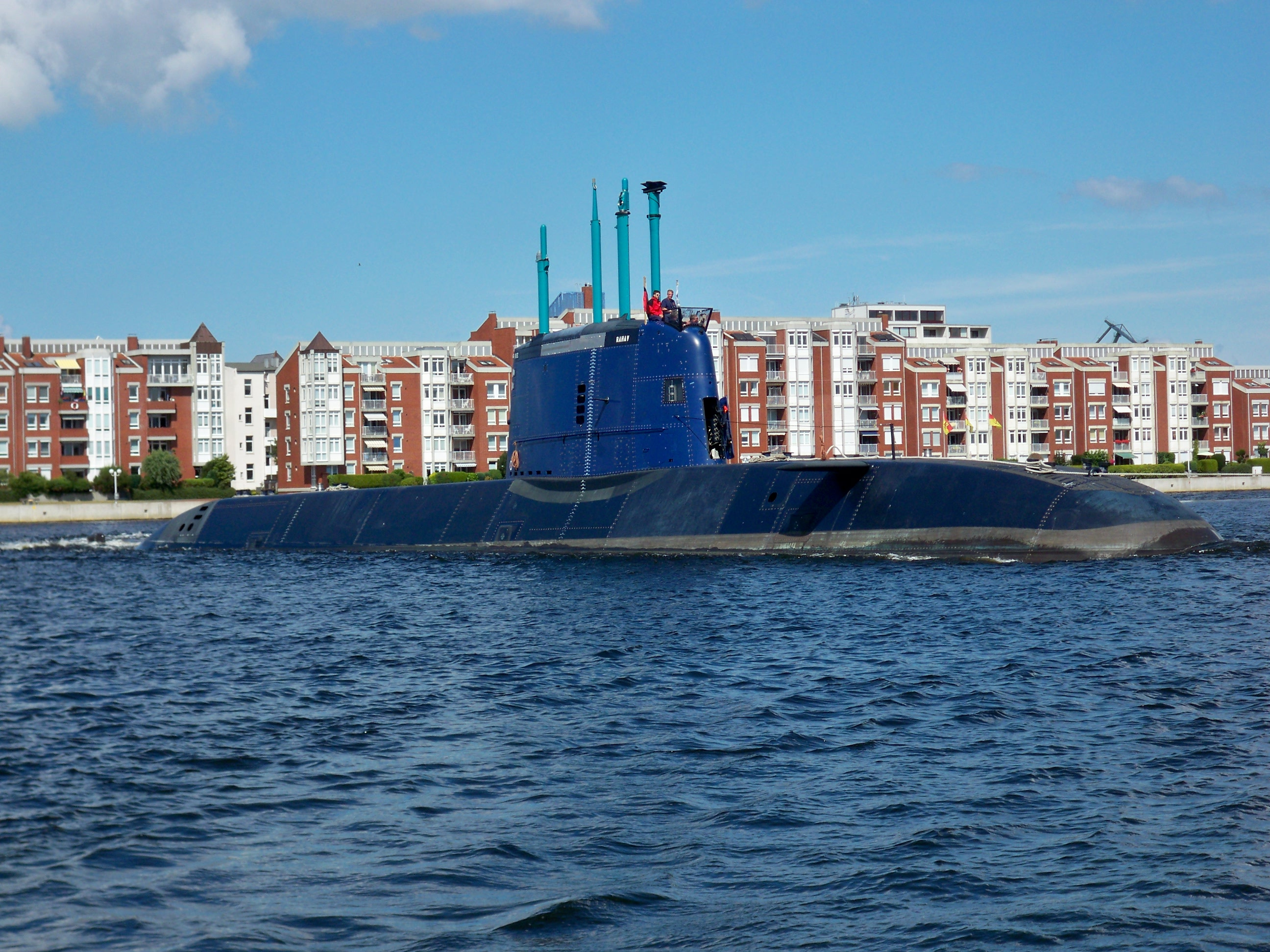
- INS Rahav, a Dolphin-II submarine, seen here during its sea trials at Wilhelmshaven, Germany, in July 2014.

Class overview
- Builders: Howaldtswerke-Deutsche Werft (HDW)
- Operators: Israeli Navy
- Preceded by: Gal class
- Succeeded by: Dakar class
- Completed: Dolphin; Leviathan (trans. "Whale" or Leviathan); Tekumah (trans. "Revival"); Tanin (trans. "Crocodile" or Tannin); Rahav (trans. "Splendour" or Rahab)
- Active: Dolphin-I: 3; Dolphin-II: 3

General characteristics
- Type: Dolphin-I: diesel-electric attack submarine; Dolphin-II: AIP / diesel-electric Attack Submarine
- Displacement: Dolphin-I Class: 1,640 tons surfaced, 1,900 tons submerged; Dolphin-II Class: 2,050 tons surfaced, 2,400 tons submerged
- Length: 57.3 m (188 ft) for Dolphin-I; 68.6 m (225 ft) for Dolphin-II; 74 m (243 ft) for INS Drakon
- Beam: 6.8 m (22 ft)
- Draught: 6.2 m (20 ft)
- Propulsion: Diesel-electric, 3 diesels, 1 shaft, 4,243 shp (3,164 kW); Dolphin-II class: air-independent HDW Fuel Cell System
- Speed: Dolphin-I class: 20 knots (37 km/h; 23 mph); Dolphin-II class: excess of 25 knots (46 km/h; 29 mph)
- Test depth: At least 350 m (1,150 ft)
- Complement: 35 + 10 additional
- Sensors & processing systems: STN Atlas ISUS 90-55 combat system
- Armament: 6 × 533 mm (21.0 in) torpedo tubes; 4 × 650 mm (26 in) diameter torpedo tubes
- Notes: The first three, non-AIP submarines of the class (Dolphin-I) are set to be replaced by the new Dakar-class submarines, beginning from the early 2030s.

The Dolphin class (Hebrew: הצוללות מסדרת דולפין) is a diesel-electric submarine developed in Israel and constructed by Howaldtswerke-Deutsche Werft (HDW) in Kiel, Germany, for the Israeli Navy's Shayetet 7 flotilla. The first three boats of the class were based on the export-only German 209-class submarines, but modified and enlarged. This Dolphin-I sub-class is slightly larger than the German Navy Type 212 in length and displacement.

Israel later procured three newer air-independent propulsion (AIP) equipped Dolphin-II boats. The first two are similar to the Type 212 vessels in underwater endurance, but are 12 metres (39 ft) longer, nearly 500 tonnes heavier in submerged displacement and have a larger crew than either the Type 212 or the Type 214. The final Dolphin-II boat, INS Drakon, is longer still at 74 metres, and possess a distinctively long sail.

The Dolphin-II class submarines are the largest to have been built in Germany since World War II and the most expensive single vehicles in the Israel Defense Forces. The Dolphin class replaced the aging Gal class, which had served in the Israeli navy since the late 1970s. Each Dolphin-class submarine is capable of carrying a combined total of up to 16 torpedoes and Popeye Turbo submarine-launched cruise missiles (SLCMs). The cruise missiles have a range of at least 1,500 km (930 mi) and are widely believed to be equipped with a 200 kiloton nuclear warhead containing up to 6 kilograms (13 lb) of plutonium. The latter, if true, would provide Israel with an offshore nuclear second-strike capability.

The first batch of the class – the three Dolphin-I submarines – are set to be replaced by the newer Dakar-class submarines from 2031 onwards.

== History ==
First budgeted in July 1989 and ordered in January 1990, by November the order for the submarines was cancelled. This was due to budget reallocation aimed at countering Iraqi threats made against Israel following the Iraqi invasion and annexation of neighboring Kuwait during the leadup to the 1991 Gulf War. Funding for the first two boats (Dolphin and Leviathan) was fully subsidized by the German government to restart the construction program and the third (Tekumah) received a 50% subsidy. During the First Gulf War, it was revealed that German firms had assisted Iraq with modernizing its ballistic missile and chemical weapon programs, thanks in part to lax enforcement by German customs, in violation of the Missile Technology Control Regime protocols which West Germany had acceded to in 1987. These enhanced missiles brought Israeli cities into Iraqi targeting range for the first time, and the Iraqi weapons research program included factories and necessary supplies for the creation of weaponized mustard and nerve gas. Though not a belligerent in the Gulf War, Israeli cities were nevertheless bombarded by these upgraded Iraqi missiles. To compensate Israel for war-related damage and economic losses and keep German shipyards occupied with a high profile project in the post Cold War defense spending downturn, then Chancellor of Germany Helmut Kohl approved an assistance package to German industry including the construction of two Dolphin-class submarines.

The names Dolphin and Leviathan hail from the retired Israeli WWII-era submarines of the British T class; the third boat Tekuma (translation: Revival) commemorates Dakar, the third Israeli boat of the T class which was lost in 1968 with all Israeli crew in the Mediterranean Sea during delivery. The names of the newer boats Tanin and Rahav are taken from retired Gal-class submarines, which were themselves named after even older Israeli S-class submarines.

=== Additional procurement ===
The silhouette profile of the Dolphin-I submarine (non-AIP).

The silhouette profile of the Dolphin-II submarine (equipped with AIP).

In 2006 Israel signed a contract with ThyssenKrupp to purchase two additional submarines from its HDW subsidiary. The two new boats are an upgraded version displacing 28% heavier than the older Dolphins, featuring an air-independent propulsion system, similar to the one used on German Type 212 submarines. On 6 July 2006, the Government of Germany decided to finance an advance to start the construction, about €170 million, planned for delivery in 2012. The two submarines cost, overall, around €1.3 billion, of up to one-third was subsidized by Germany. In 2010, both Israel and Germany denied having talks regarding the potential purchase of a sixth submarine. Yet in 2011, Israel ordered a sixth Dolphin-class submarine, for which it was reported to pay the unsubsidized cost of US$1 billion. However, in July 2011, during a meeting between German Defense Minister Thomas de Maizière and Israeli Prime Minister Binyamin Netanyahu and Defense minister Ehud Barak, an agreement was reached to subsidize €135 million of the US$500–700 million cost of the sixth submarine.

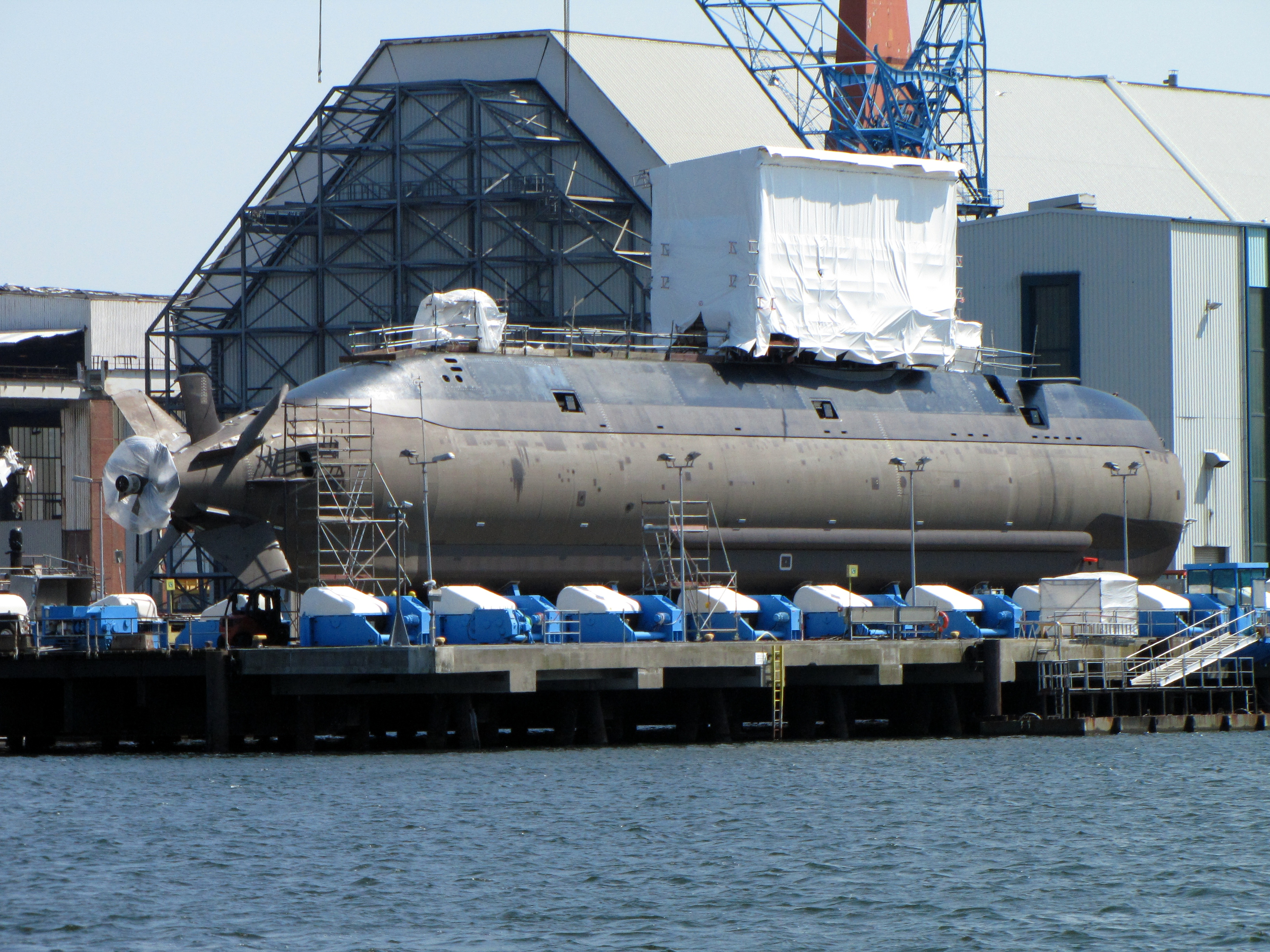
INS Tanin, a Dolphin-II submarine, while under-construction at HDW's shipyard in Kiel, in July 2012.

In 2016, it was revealed that a new sonar developed by Rafael Advanced Defense Systems was being fitted on all Dolphin submarines in the last two years. The new capabilities provided to the Dolphin submarines by the Israeli sonar also include detection of vessels with a low noise signature. The algorithms used in the sonar systems enable it to ignore many of the noises that can disrupt the range of the systems' activity, while detecting very distant noises.

In late 2016 reports emerged of negotiations for the purchase of three additional ThyssenKrupp built submarines. The former Defense Minister Moshe Ya’alon, who opposed the acquisition during his tenure, called for the Attorney General Avichai Mandelblit to investigate the negotiations which included Prime Minister Benjamin Netanyahu's personal attorney David Shimron for work while on retainer to the offices of Miki Ganor which represents ThyssenKrupp in Israel. On 23 November 2016 Mandelblit decided to ask the state prosecutor to move forward with an investigation into the case. In July 2021 with the newly formed government in power and the Netanyahu-led government out of power MK Gantz the new Defense Minister as well as MK Sa'ar began an official process into initiating a state investigation into the case 3000 submarine procurement case saying "An official inquiry committee that will investigate all aspects of the affair is the need of the hour". However, the government's submarine procurement investigation was delayed as the ThyssenKrupp negotiations for the purchase of new submarines with additional capabilities was ongoing and likely to cost €2.4B.

In October 2017, Israel and Germany confirmed that they finalised a memorandum of understanding covering the Israeli Navy's purchase of three more Dolphin-class submarines to be delivered starting in 2027. Later dubbed the Dakar class, the deal was formally signed in January 2022, with the then envisaged delivery of the first boat occurring within nine years. These boats would replace the first three Dolphin-I class submarines which by then would be about 30 years old. Germany would provide industrial subsidies to German companies building and outfitting the submarines covering a third of purchase costs.

== Armament and systems ==
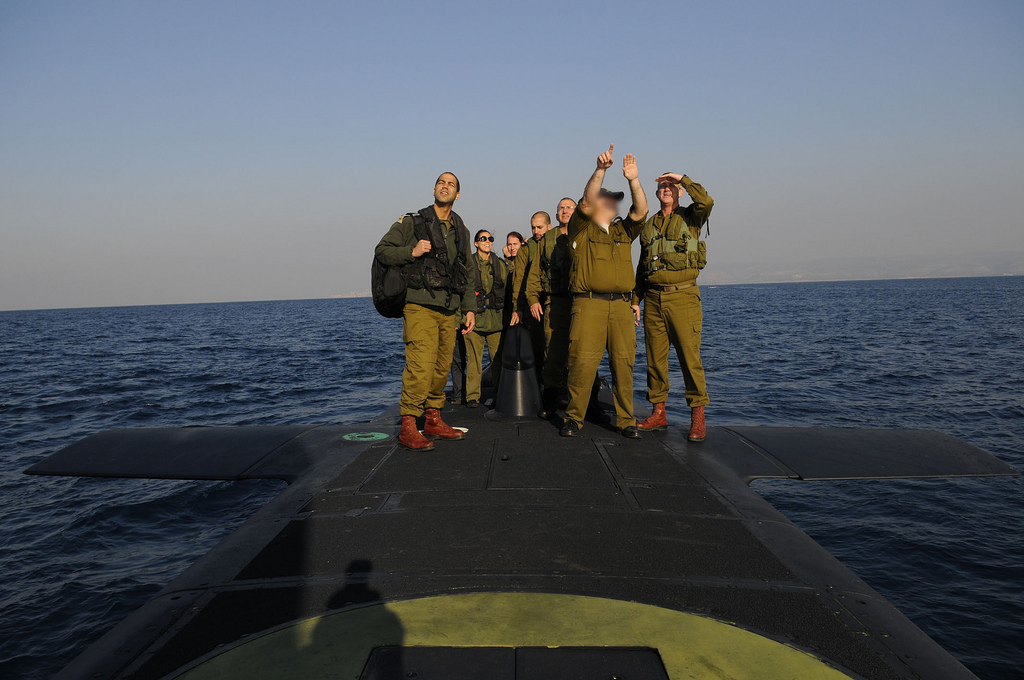
Then-IDF chief-of-staff Benny Gantz reviewing a Dolphin-I submarine in 2014

Each submarine is fitted with 6 × 533 mm (21.0 in) torpedo tubes, and 4 × 650 mm (26 in) torpedo tubes. The very large 650 mm tubes can be used for laying mines, larger submarine-launched cruise missiles, or swimmer delivery vehicles, and with liners the tubes could be used for standard torpedoes and submarine-launched missiles. The boats were first armed with Atlas Elektronik DM2A3 torpedoes using wire-guided active homing to deliver a 260 kg (570 lb) warhead at a maximum speed of 40 knots (74 km/h; 46 mph) to a target over 13 km (8.1 mi) away, in passive homing mode a speed of 22 knots (41 km/h; 25 mph) and a range up to 28 km (17 mi) is possible. Israel has also procured the more advanced DM2A4 torpedo, successor to their DM2A3s, which are electrically propelled, equipped with fiber optic communications and has countermeasure resistant signals processing and mission logic. A wet and dry compartment is installed for deploying underwater special operations teams.

Jane's Defence Weekly reported that the Dolphin-class submarines are believed to be nuclear armed, offering Israel a sea-based, second strike capability. In adherence to Missile Technology Control Regime rules the US Clinton administration rejected an Israeli request in 2000 to purchase Tomahawk long range SLCMs. The U.S. Navy has deployed nuclear armed and conventional Tomahawk missiles for its submarine fleet which are launched from standard heavy 533 mm torpedo tubes. The Federation of American Scientists and GlobalSecurity.org reported that the four larger torpedo tubes are capable of launching Israeli built nuclear-armed Popeye Turbo cruise missiles (a variant of the Popeye standoff missile), and the U.S. Navy recorded an Israeli submarine-launched cruise missile test in the Indian Ocean ranging 1,500 km (930 mi).

The Dolphin class uses the ISUS 90-1 TCS weapon control system supplied by STN Atlas Elektronik, for automatic sensor management, fire control, navigation, and operations. The installed radar warning receiver is a 4CH(V)2 Timnex electronic support measures system, scanning from 5 GHz to 20 GHz frequency bands and able to pinpoint radar sites with accuracy between 5 and 10 degrees of angle (depending on frequency). The surface search radar is an Elta unit operating on I band. The sonar suite includes the advanced Atlas Elektronik CSU 90 hull-mounted passive and active search and attack sonar. The PRS-3 passive ranging sonar is also supplied by Atlas Elektronik, the flank array is a FAS-3 passive search sonar. A notable design feature is the prismatic hull cross-section and smoothly faired transitions from the hull to the sail, improving the boat's stealth characteristics. The ship and internal features are constructed of nonmagnetic materials, significantly reducing the chances of it being detected by magnetometers or setting off magnetic naval mines. The submarines have two Kollmorgen periscopes. The Dolphins can mount an external special forces hangar aft of their sail.

The Dolphins are equipped with three V-16 396 SE 84 diesel engines built by MTU Friedrichshafen (now Rolls-Royce Power Systems), developing 3.12 MW (4,180 hp) sustained power. The submarines are equipped with three Siemens 750 kW alternators, and a Siemens 2.85 MW sustained-power motor driving a single shaft. The propulsion system provides a speed of 20 knots (37 km/h; 23 mph) submerged and a snorkeling speed of 11 knots (20 km/h; 13 mph). The hull is rated for dives up to 350 m (1,150 ft). The maximum unrefuelled range is 8,000 nautical miles (15,000 km; 9,200 mi) traveling on the surface at 8 knots (15 km/h; 9.2 mph) and over 400 nautical miles (740 km; 460 mi) at 8 knots (15 km/h; 9.2 mph) submerged; they are designed to remain unsupplied for up to 30 days on station.

== Operational service ==
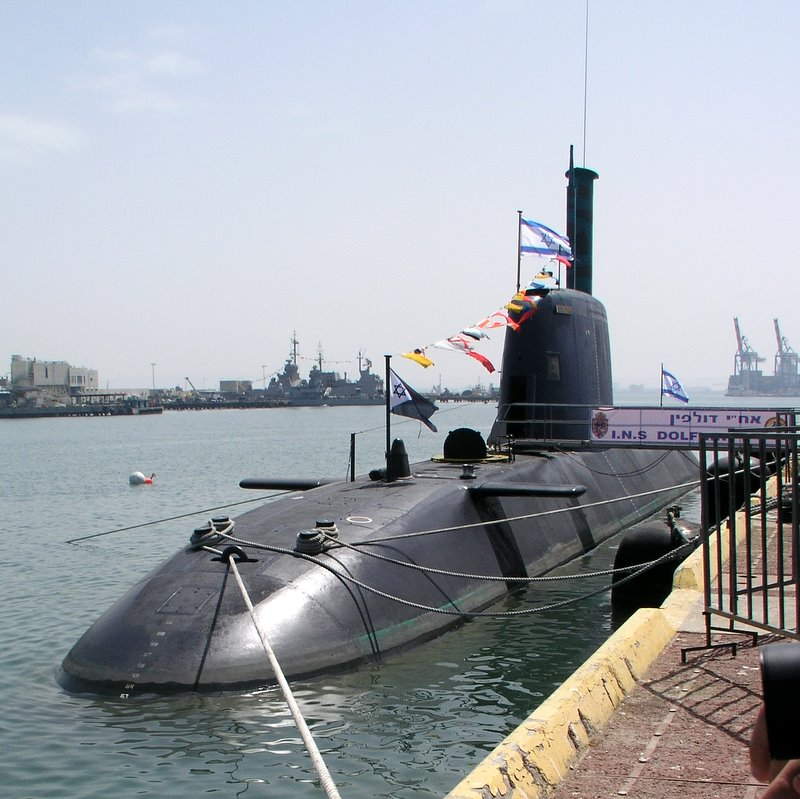
INS Dolphin - a Dolphin-I submarine, seen here in 2010.

According to news reports the submarines are normally based in the Mediterranean, although one Dolphin class was sent to the Red Sea for exercises, briefly docking at the naval base of Eilat in June 2009, which Israeli media interpreted as a warning to Iran. In 2009 the Israeli newspaper Haaretz, quoting an Israeli defence official, reported that the very small Eilat naval station is unsuited strategically to base the Dolphin-class boats, specifically noting the tight entrance of the Gulf of Aqaba at the Straits of Tiran as one held by potential adversaries including Saudi Arabia on the east and the demilitarized Egyptian Sinai to the west. Eilat is a 10 km (6.2 mi) strip of coast between Egypt and Jordan. According to The London Sunday Times, the Israeli Navy decided in May 2010 to keep at least one submarine equipped with nuclear-tipped SLCM there permanently as a deterrent in response to rumored ballistic missiles moved from Syria to Lebanon.

If the boats are based at the larger Haifa naval base, access to the Persian Gulf area either requires openly sailing on the surface through the Egyptian controlled Suez Canal as permitted in the Egypt–Israel peace treaty or a long voyage sailing around Africa. According to the Convention of Constantinople signed by the ruling great powers of the time including the UK, France, and the Ottoman Empire on March 2, 1888; "The Suez Maritime Canal shall always be free and open, in time of war as in time of peace, to every vessel of commerce or of war, without distinction of flag." Denied crossing at the Suez Canal and blockade of the Straits of Tiran occurred in both in 1956 and 1967 leading to Israel twice seizing the Sinai to break the blockade. The Egypt–Israel peace treaty allows for the free passage of Israeli vessels through the Suez Canal, and recognizes the Strait of Tiran and the Gulf of Aqaba as international waterways. Even if a Red Sea or Indian Ocean base is unavailable other nations have used submarine tenders, ships that resupply, rearm, and refuel submarines at sea, when nearby friendly bases are unavailable.

According to two contradictory Sudanese media reports, in November or December 2011 two Israeli air raids against Gaza-bound weapon smugglers in Sudan were accompanied by Israeli submarine activity off the Sudanese coast. The Sudanese government claims no strikes took place.

In February 2012, Ynet, the online version of the Israeli newspaper Yediot Achronot, reported that for security reasons applicants for the submarine service with dual citizenship or citizenship in addition to Israeli, which is common in Israel with a relatively high percentage of olim (immigrants), must officially renounce all other citizenships to be accepted into the training program.

Israel National News and The Jerusalem Post both had articles on Sunday, July 14, 2013, which quoted that day's London Sunday Times saying that the July 5 Israeli missile strike against the Syrian port of Latakia, previously reported by CNN as an Israel Air Force strike, was made in coordination with the United States, and long range missiles were launched from a Dolphin-class submarine. The attack targeted newly unloaded Russian-made Yakhont long range high performance anti-ship missiles and associated radars.

In December, 2020, an IDF submarine transited the Suez Canal and the Red Sea, en route to the Persian Gulf in possible preparation for any Iranian retaliation over the November assassination of a senior Iranian nuclear scientist, Mohsen Fakhrizadeh.

== Speculation regarding INS Drakon ==
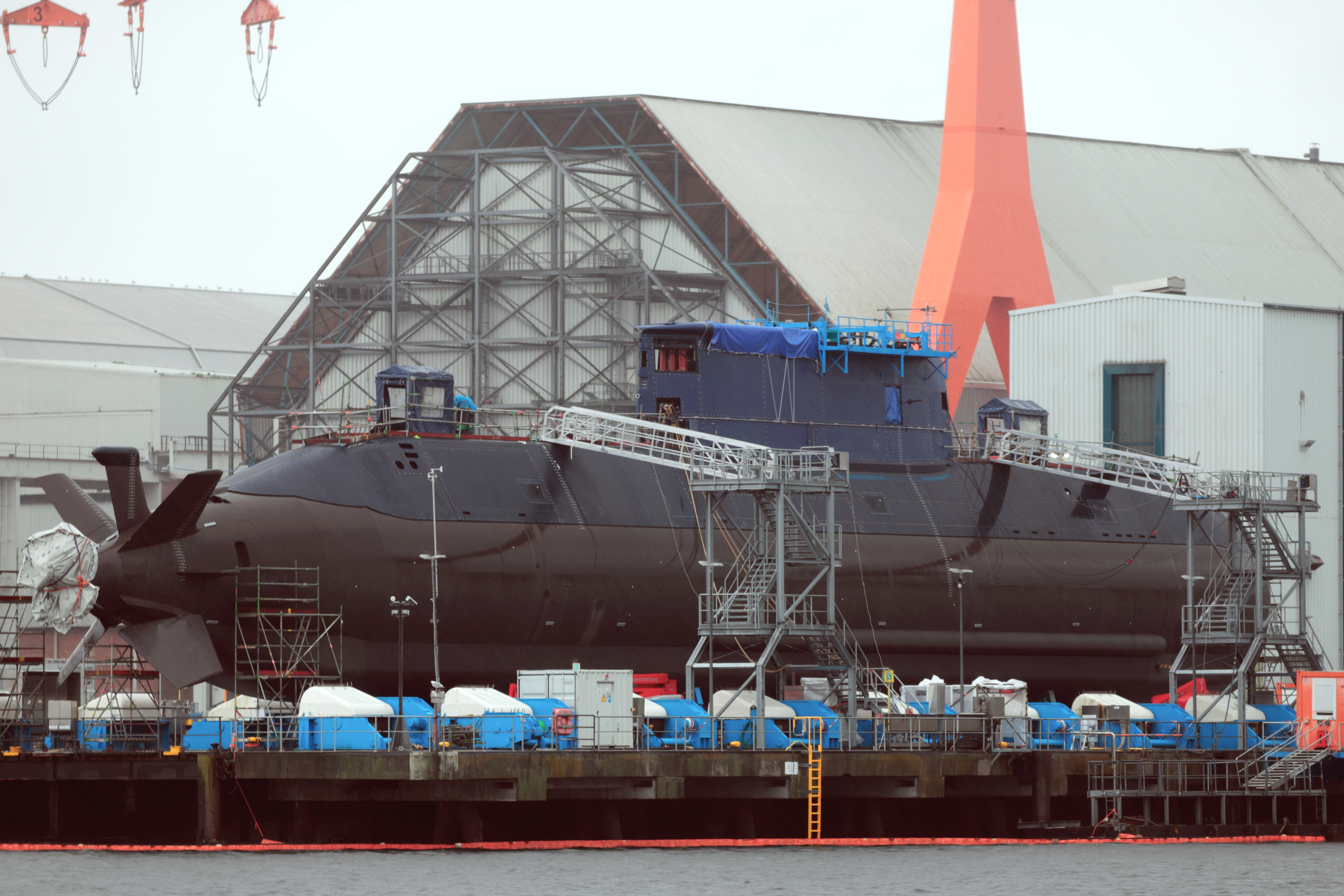
INS Drakon with larger sail

Although unconfirmed by either the German or Israeli government, there was speculation that the Drakon would be longer than previous boats of its class and might have new weapon capabilities, including a vertical launch system (VLS).

The boat was reported to have been taken out of the water but re-launched again in August 2023. With the re-launch, photographs confirmed a much larger sail which might accommodate its vertical launch missile silos, if these fitted to the vessel. According to analysis conducted by Matus Smutny, the sail "could also contain a special release compartment for unmanned underwater vehicles (UUVs), aerial drones, and/or other special operations and intelligence-gathering equipment. The revised sail could also be related to some kind of proof-of-concept for technology to be used in the upcoming Dakar class".

== Submarines in the class ==
Name	Shipyard	Status	Contract	Steel cutting	Launched	Comm.	Notes
Dolphin-I
INS Dolphin	Nordseewerke Emden	Active	Jun 1991	1994	1996	27 Jul 1999	
INS Leviathan	Nordseewerke Emden	Active	Jun 1991	1995	1997	Nov 1999	
INS Tekuma	Nordseewerke Emden	Active	9 Feb 1995	1996	9 Jul 1998	Oct 2000	
Dolphin-II
INS Tanin	HDW, Kiel	Active	Aug 2006	–	3 May 2012	23 Sep 2014	
INS Rahav	HDW, Kiel	Active	Aug 2006	–	29 Apr 2013	12 Jan 2016	
INS Drakon	HDW, Kiel	Active	Mar 2012	–	12 Nov 2024	5 Aug 2026	

== See also ==
- List of submarine classes in service

=== Equivalent submarines of the same era ===
- Type 212A
- Song class
- Gotland class
- Scorpène class
- Heroine class
- Lada class

=== Other references to the Israeli Navy ===
- Dakar class
- List of ships of the Israeli Navy
