= Type 216 submarine =

Lead boat of the Invincible-class submarine

Class overview
- Name: Type 216
- Builders: Howaldtswerke-Deutsche Werft, Kiel, Germany (part of ThyssenKrupp Marine Systems)
- Preceded by: Dolphin class; Type 212; Type 214
- Succeeded by: Type 218SG
- Active: None

General characteristics
- Type: Submarine
- Displacement: 4,000 metric tonnes
- Length: 90 m (295 ft 3 in)
- Beam: 8.1 m (26 ft 7 in)
- Draft: 6.6 m (21 ft 8 in)
- Decks: 2
- Propulsion: Diesel-electric with AIP
- Speed: over 20 knots (37 km/h; 23 mph)
- Range: 10,400 nmi (19,300 km; 12,000 mi) at 10 knots (19 km/h; 12 mph)
- Endurance: 120 days
- Complement: 33 + Additional berths for Special Forces, Specialists, and Students
- Crew: 23
- Armament: 6 × 21-inch (533 mm) torpedo tubes (18 torpedoes or anti-ship missiles or mines); 1, 2, or 3 Vertical Multi-Purpose Locks for 24 missiles or 24 mines each; Swimmer Delivery Vehicle; Countermeasures
- Notes: Design concept only (none ordered)

The Type 216 was a submarine design concept announced by the German shipbuilding company Howaldtswerke-Deutsche Werft based on the Type 212/214.

== Development ==
The design is double hulled with two decks, includes a fuel cell, permanent-magnet synchronous motor, and lithium-ion batteries. It is a larger design targeted to meet the needs of the Australian Collins-class submarine replacement project, also known as SEA 1000, and the needs of other countries possibly including India and Canada. The Royal Australian Navy eventually chose the Shortfin Barracuda, a conventional variant of the French Barracuda-class submarine and no Type 216 was put in production, though this deal was later rescinded.

The AIP-equipped Type 218SG of the Republic of Singapore Navy is a modified design based on the Type 216. Four submarines were ordered by the Republic of Singapore Navy and the lead vessel RSS Invincible was launched in February 2019, followed by one more launched on 13 December 2022, and another two under construction.

== See also ==
Similar submarine classes

- Type 212 submarine – a class of diesel-electric attack submarines developed by ThyssenKrupp Marine Systems and exclusively built for the German Navy, the Italian Navy and the Royal Norwegian Navy.
- Type 214 submarine – a class of export-oriented diesel-electric attack submarines, also developed by ThyssenKrupp Marine Systems and currently operated by the Hellenic Navy, the Portuguese Navy, the Republic of Korea Navy and the Turkish Naval Forces.
- Type 218SG submarine – now known as Invincible-class, extensively customized diesel-electric attack submarines developed by ThyssenKrupp Marine Systems and currently operated by the Republic of Singapore Navy.
- Dolphin-class submarine – a class of extensively customized diesel-electric attack submarines developed by ThyssenKrupp Marine Systems and currently operated by Israel.
- Dakar-class submarine – a unique class of diesel-electric attack submarines developed by ThyssenKrupp Marine Systems and currently being built for Israel.
- Scorpène-class submarine – a class of export-oriented diesel-electric attack submarines, jointly developed by Naval Group and Navantia and currently operated by the Chilean Navy, the Royal Malaysian Navy, the Indian Navy and the Brazilian Navy.
- S-80 Plus submarine – a class of conventionally-powered attack submarines, currently being built by Navantia for the Spanish Navy.
- KSS-III submarine – a class of diesel-electric attack submarines, built by Daewoo Shipbuilding & Marine Engineering and Hyundai Heavy Industries and operated by the Republic of Korea Navy.
- Sōryū-class submarine – a class of diesel-electric attack submarines, built by Mitsubishi Heavy Industries for the Japan Maritime Self-Defense Force.
- Taigei-class submarine – a class of diesel-electric attack submarines currently being built by Mitsubishi Heavy Industries and Kawasaki Heavy Industries for the Japan Maritime Self-Defense Force
- Type 039A submarine – a class of diesel-electric attack submarines operated by the People's Liberation Army Navy (China) and under construction for the navies of the Royal Thai Navy and the Pakistan Navy.
- Lada-class submarine – a class of diesel-electric attack submarines being built for the Russian Navy.
