= Dosan Ahn Changho-class submarine =

South Korean submarine class

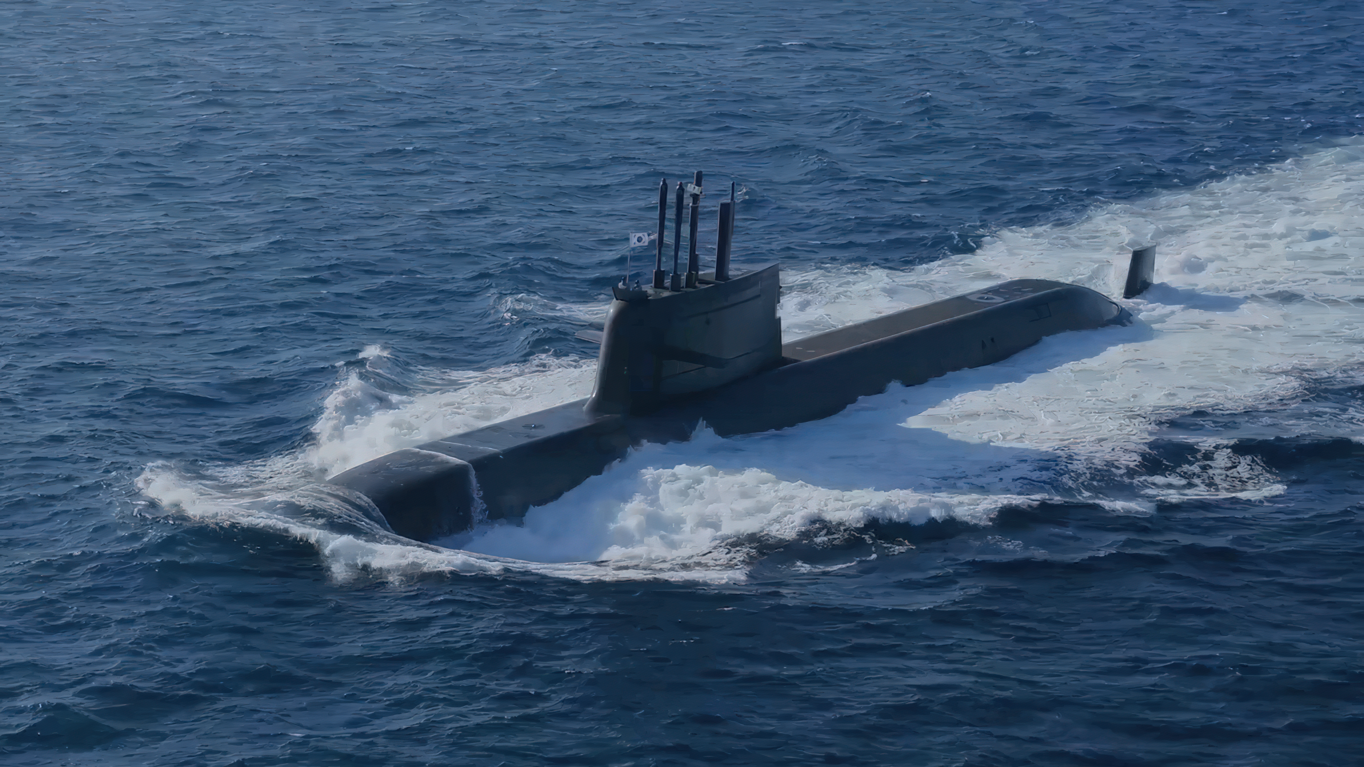
- ROKS Dosan Ahn Changho

Class overview
- Builders: Hanwha Ocean; HD Hyundai Heavy Industries
- Operators: Republic of Korea Navy (ROKN)
- Preceded by: Son Won-il class (Type 214 submarine)
- Succeeded by: Jang Yeongsil-class (KSS-III Batch-II)
- Cost: US$900,000,000 per submarine
- Built: 2014–present
- In service: 2021–present
- Planned: 9
- Building: 3
- Completed: 3
- Active: 3

General characteristics
- Type: Attack submarine with ballistic missile launching capabilities
- Displacement: Batch-I:-; 3,358 tonnes (3,305 long tons) (Surfaced); 3,750 tonnes (3,690 long tons) (Submerged); Batch-II:-; 3,600 tonnes (3,500 long tons) (Surfaced); 4,000 tonnes (3,900 long tons) (Submerged)
- Length: Batch-I:-; 83.5 m (273 ft 11 in); Batch-II:-; 89.3 m (293 ft 0 in)
- Beam: Batch-I/II:-; 9.6 m (31 ft 6 in)
- Draught: Batch-I:-; 7.62 m (25 ft 0 in)
- Propulsion: Batch-I:-; Diesel-electric propulsion; 3 × MTU 16V396SE84L marine diesel engines; Air-independent propulsion (AIP); 4 × Bumhan Industries PH1 PEM fuel cells, each with 100 kW output; Batch-II:-; Diesel-electric propulsion; 3 × MTU 12V 4000 U83 marine diesel engines; Air-independent propulsion; 4 × Bumhan Industries PH1 PEM fuel cells, each with 100 kW output with increased hydrogen and liquid oxygen storage; Samsung SDI lithium-ion batteries
- Speed: 12 knots (22 km/h; 14 mph) (surfaced); 6 knots (11 km/h; 6.9 mph) (submerged) on fuel cell operation; 20 knots (37 km/h; 23 mph) (submerged)
- Range: 10,000 nautical miles (19,000 km; 12,000 mi)
- Endurance: 20+ days (submerged)
- Complement: 50
- Sensors & processing systems: Combat suite: Hanwha-developed "Combat Management System" (CMS); Sonar: LIG Nex1-developed sonar suite; Thales-developed mine-avoidance sonar; Electronic warfare: Indra-developed radar electronic support measurement (RESM); Other processing systems: Safran-developed "Series 30" optronic surveillance mast; Babcock-developed "Weapons Handling and Launch System" (WHLS); ECA Group-developed steering consoles
- Armament: Batch-I:-; 6 × 533 mm (21 in) torpedo tubes; LIG Nex1 K761 Tiger Shark heavyweight torpedoes; 6 × K-VLS cells; 6 × Hyunmoo 4-4 submarine-launched ballistic missile; Batch-II:-; 6 × 533 mm (21 in) torpedo tubes; LIG Nex1 K761 Tiger Shark heavyweight torpedoes; C-Star-III anti-ship cruise missiles; LIG Nex1 submarine-launched mobile sea mine; 10 × K-VLS cells; 10 × Hyunmoo 4-4 submarine-launched ballistic missile; Chonryong land attack cruise missiles
- Notes: First-ever AIP-equipped submarine capable of launching submarine-launched ballistic missiles (SLBM).

The KSS-III Batch-I (Korean Submarine-III Batch-I; Korean: 한국형 잠수함-III 배치-I; Hanja: 韓國型潛水艦-III 배치-I), officially called Dosan Ahn Changho class (Korean: 도산안창호급 잠수함; Hanja: 島山安昌浩級潛水艦; RR: Dosan-anchangho-geup Jamsuham) is a series of diesel-electric attack and ballistic missile submarines currently being built for the Republic of Korea Navy (ROKN), jointly by Hanwha Ocean and HD Hyundai Heavy Industries (HHI). The KSS-III is the final phase of the Korean Attack Submarine program, a three-phased program to build 27 attack submarines for the ROKN, between 1994–2029.

The KSS-III initiative consists of the development of nine diesel-electric attack submarines, capable of firing submarine-launched ballistic missiles (SLBM), to be built in three batches, between 2014–2029.

A total of three submarines of the first batch of the series have been launched, with the first submarine, ROKS Dosan Ahn Changho, being commissioned on 13 August 2019. The second ship, ROKS Ahn Mu, was commissioned on 20 April 2023.

== Name ==
The series is named for the Korean independence activist Ahn Chang Ho. Ahn's art name was Dosan.

== Design ==
=== Background ===
The design of the KSS-III was jointly designed by Daewoo Shipbuilding & Marine Engineering (now Hanwha Ocean) and Hyundai Heavy Industries (now HD Hyundai Heavy Industries) - two of South Korea's largest shipbuilding enterprises; preparations for the design began in 2007. The KSS-III is the largest submarine built in Korea and the first submarine designed with domestic technology, unlike the KSS-II submarine (Son Won-il-class submarine) previously produced in cooperation with Howaldtswerke-Deutsche Werft (HDW).

The Dosan Ahn Changho class, the first 3,000-ton submarine designed through the KSS-III program, achieved a 76 percent localization rate, twice as high as the previously license-built KSS-II submarine. The development process adopted a design process using digital mock-up simulation for the first time in Korea, and the hull was made of HY-100 alloy steel to withstand high pressure of deep water. Although the size of the submarine is larger than that of the existing KSS-II submarine, the noise is minimized by applying non-acoustic stealth technologies such as acoustic anechoic coating and elastic mounts. The submarine's interior is made up of large and small pipes measuring 85 km in total length and has 127 types of acoustic and electronic equipment embedded in.

The first vessel, ROKS Dosan Ahn Changho, of the KSS-III program was designed as a system development process using experimental technologies to demonstrate South Korea's independent submarine building capabilities, but the second, ROKS Ahn Mu, is the first submarine to be built and commissioned through an official mass production process. Ahn Mu successfully passed 125 items of builder test, 208 items of harbor acceptance test, and 90 items of sea acceptance test during the trial run process from January 2020 to April 2023. It also includes key features such as VHF marine communication system, passive linear array sonar, torpedo acoustic counter measure, underwater radiated noise level, electric propulsion motor, which are improved from the previous Dosan Ahn Changho.

==== Batch-I ====
The Batch-I series is the first phase of the KSS-III program - consisting of the construction of three attack submarines - with the first two to be built by Daewoo Shipbuilding & Marine Engineering (DSME) and the third one to be built by HHI.

The Batch-I design possesses a length of 83.5 metres (273 ft 11 in), with a breadth of 9.6 m (31 ft 6 in) and a draught of 7.62 m (25 ft 0 in) - with a displacement of 3,358 tonnes (3,305 long tons) while surfaced and 3,750 tonnes (3,690 long tons) while submerged; they are the first submarines with a displacement of 3,000 tonnes to ever be built by South Korea. According to DSME, over 76% of the submarine's components were procured from within South Korea.

The Batch-I design has an estimated speed of about 12 knots (22 km/h; 14 mph) while surfaced, and 20 knots (37 km/h; 23 mph) while submerged - and possesses a cruising range of around 10,000 nautical miles (19,000 km; 12,000 mi), at economic speed, along with a crew complement of 50. The design further incorporates an indigenously-designed fuel-cell powered air-independent propulsion (AIP) module - which enables the submarine to conduct long-distance underwater operations for up to 20 days. The PH1 cell module developed by Bumhan Industries is also the world's second hydrogen fuel cell used in submarines after Siemens' fuel cells.

The design accommodates six Korean vertical launching system (K-VLS) cells, located behind the submarine's sail - for carrying six Hyunmoo 4-4 submarine-launched ballistic missiles (SLBM), along with six 533-millimetre (21 in) forward-firing torpedo tubes, located at the bow. The KSS-III is the first ever AIP-equipped attack-submarine capable of launching submarine-launched ballistic missiles.

==== Batch-II ====
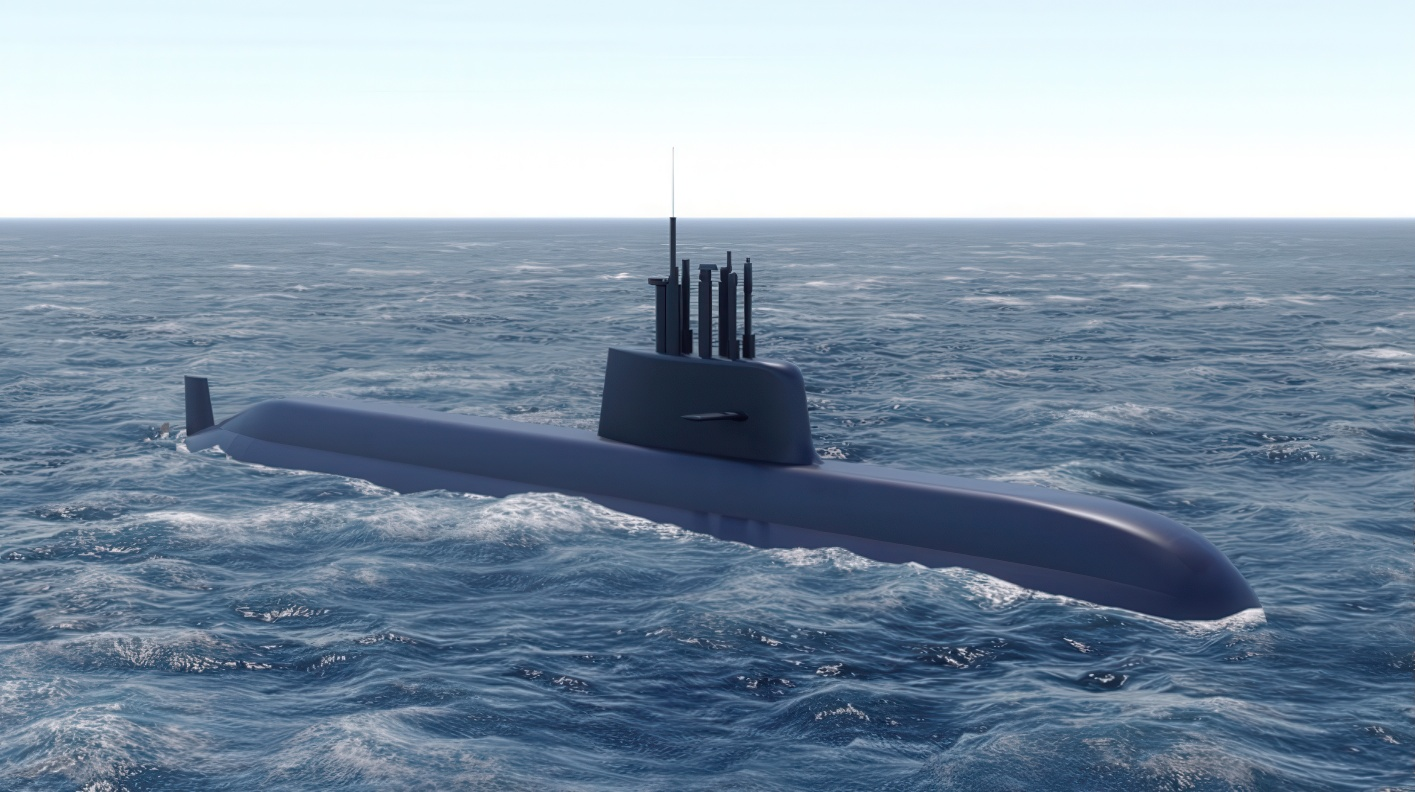
KSS-III Batch-II

The Batch-II series constitutes the second phase of the KSS-III program and is noted to possess multiple improvements in terms of design, armament, and automation over the Batch-I series.

The Batch-II design possesses a length of 89.3 m (293 ft), with a breadth of 9.6 m (31 ft), along with an estimated displacement of around 3,600 t (3,500 long tons). According to DSME, the Batch-II series will be equipped with "a greater level of South Korean technology", with over 80% of the submarine's parts to be domestically sourced.

Similar to the Batch-I, the Batch-II will also reportedly have a top speed of 20 knots (37 km/h; 23 mph) and a crew complement of 50.

A notable feature of the Batch-II submarines is its lithium-ion battery technology (LiB); the Batch-II series will be equipped with lithium-ion batteries developed by Samsung SDI (and supplied by Hanwha Defense), apart from the AIP system. Compared to previous lead-acid batteries which are generally used to power other conventionally-powered submarines, the new lithium-ion batteries will reportedly allow the KSS-III to cruise at greater speeds with a greater period of underwater endurance, life-expectancy and durability. Korea is only the second country in the world to field submarines equipped with lithium-ion batteries; the first is Japan, which utilizes lithium-ion battery technology aboard its Sōryū-class submarines.

The design also incorporates ten K-VLS cells (compared to six on the Batch-I) which are presumably to carry the Hyunmoo 4-4 ballistic missiles and the future Chonryong land-attack cruise missile.

== Instrumentation ==
=== Armament ===
- Torpedoes – The KSS-III is equipped with six 533 mm (21 in) forward-firing torpedo tubes, for firing the "Tiger Shark" heavyweight torpedoes, developed by LIG Nex1.
- Missiles – The Batch-I submarines are equipped with six K-VLS cells, capable of launching the Hyunmoo 4-4 ballistic missiles which is estimated to possess a range of around 500 km (310 mi). In contrast, the Batch-II submarines will be equipped to ten K-VLS cell, presumably for carrying the Hyunmoo 4-4, as well as the future Chonryong land-attack cruise missile, currently in development.
- Weapon Handling System – The Batch-I vessels are also equipped with a "Weapons Handling and Launch System" (WHLS) developed by UK-based naval conglomerate Babcock International.

=== Sensors ===
The Batch-I series is currently equipped with an assortment of different sensors and equipment, including:

- Combat Management Suite – A "Naval Shield Integrated Combat Management System" (ICMS), developed by Hanhwa.
- Sonar – A sonar suite, developed by LIG Nex1, comprising:
  - Flank-array sonar (FAS)
  - Towed-array sonar
  - Intercept-passive sonar
  - Continuous-active sonar (CAS)
  - Mine-avoidance sonar, developed by Thales
- Electronic warfare – "Pegaso" radar electronic support-measures (RESM), developed by Indra.
- Other systems
  - "Series 30 Attack and Search" optronic mast, developed by Safran.
  - Noise-analysis/noise-reduction technology, developed by LIG Nex1.
  - Steering-consoles, developed by ECA Group.

== Construction ==
=== Batch-I ===
On 26 December 2012 - South Korea's Ministry of National Defense (MND) contracted DSME to build the first two Batch-I submarines - at an estimated cost of US$1.56 billion. On 30 November 2016 - the MND contracted HHI to build the third submarine of the series.

The construction of the first submarine began in November 2014, with a "steel-cutting" ceremony at DSME's shipyard in Okpo, South Korea The submarine, christened as the Dosan Ahn Changho, was launched in an elaborate ceremony on 14 September 2018 - an event that was attended by senior representatives from South Korea's government and military, including South Korean president Moon Jae-in. Dosan Ahn Changho began its sea trials in June 2019 and was commissioned into the ROKN on 13 August 2021.

Work on the second submarine began - with the laying of its keel in July 2016. Christened as the Ahn Mu, the submarine was launched on 10 November 2020. It is scheduled to be delivered by 2022.

The construction of the third and final submarine began in June 2017, at HHI's shipbuilding facility in Ulsan, South Korea. Christened as the Shin Chae-ho, the submarine was launched on 28 September 2021. It is scheduled to be delivered by 2024.

=== Batch-II ===
On 11 October 2019, South Korea's Defense Acquisition Program Administration (DAPA) contracted DSME to design and build the first Batch-II submarine - at an estimated cost KRW ₩1.11 trillion. On 10 September 2019, DSME was again contracted to build the second Batch-II submarine - at an estimated cost of ₩985.7 billion.

The construction of the first submarine - the Jang Yeong-sil, began in August 2021 and is scheduled to be delivered to the ROKN in 2027. The Jang Yeong-sil was launched on 22 October 2025 at Hanwah Ocean's shipyard, days before Canadian prime minister Mark Carney was to tour it as part of a potential purchase of 12 KSS-III by the Royal Canadian Navy.

The construction of the second submarine began in December 2021 and is scheduled to be delivered to the ROKN by 2028.

== Export variants ==
=== DSME-2000 ===
At the 2019 convention of the "International Maritime Defense Industry Exhibition" (MADEX), held at Busan, South Korea, DSME unveiled the DSME-2000 - a 2,000 t (2,000 long tons), diesel-electric variant of the KSS-III, as an export-oriented design for foreign navies.

The DSME-2000 possesses a length of 70.3 m (230 ft 8 in) and a diameter of 6.3 m (20 ft 8 in), with a crew complement of 40, with additional space for about 10 special forces commandos. The design has an estimated speed of 10 knots (19 km/h; 12 mph) while surfaced, and 20 knots (37 km/h; 23 mph) while submerged and possesses a cruising range of around 10,000 nmi (19,000 km; 12,000 mi), at cruising speed.

The DSME-2000 displaces at 2,000 tonnes and is larger than South Korea's Jang Bogo-class submarine (based on the Type 209/1400 design) and the Son Won-il class (based on the Type 214 design), but is smaller than the Dosan Ahn Changho class.

The design incorporates an arrangement of eight 533 mm (21.0 in) forward-firing torpedo tubes, with a pack of 16 torpedoes - although this can be combined with an assortment of naval mines and anti-ship missiles. The submarine's design also features a flexible weapon launching system - which can be tailored according to the customer's requirements.

Similar to the KSS-III, the DSME-2000 will also be equipped with an AIP module and lithium-ion batteries. The design also includes an assortment of equipment, including -

- A sonar suite, equipped with :-
  - Cylindrical Hydrophone Array
  - Intercept Detection and Ranging Sonar
  - Flank Array Sonar
  - Passive Ranging Sonar
  - Active Operation Sonar
  - Towed Array Sonar
- A mast-sensor suite, equipped with :-
  - Electronic support measures (ESM)
  - Satellite communication (SATCOM)
  - Radar
  - Up to two communication retractable masts
  - Optronics

=== DSME-3000 ===
DSME has offered a 3,000-tonne variant of the KSS-III, known as the DSME-3000 to the Indian Navy, under the latter's Project-75 (India) (P-75I) submarine procurement initiative. The DSME-3000 is noted to be quite similar to the KSS-III, featuring a displacement of about 3,300 t, with a length measuring 83.5 m (273 ft 11 in) and a beam measuring 9.7 m (31 ft 10 in). The DSME-3000 was first displayed to the public at the 2021 convention of the "International Maritime Defense Industry Exhibition" (MADEX), held at Busan, South Korea.

The DSME-3000 will be equipped with lithium-ion batteries and a fuel-cell powered AIP system, as on the KSS-III; however, the variant being offered to India lacks the K-VLS cells, which are standard on both Batch-I and Batch-II submarines being built for the Republic of Korea Navy.

DSME entered the competition in April 2019 and was later shortlisted as a finalist, along with four other international shipyards - ThyssenKrupp Marine Systems (TKMS), Rubin Design Bureau, Navantia and Naval Group.

== Operators ==
=== Current Operators ===
South Korea

Republic of Korea Navy — Three in service, out of a total of nine planned.

=== Potential Operators ===
Morocco

Royal Moroccan Navy - In April 2025, Moroccan Minister of Industry and Trade Ryad Mezzour visited Seoul, where he reportedly discussed Rabat's intention to purchase the K2 Black Panther, along with the M-SAM air defense system and KSS-III submarines.

== Boats in the class ==
Name	Pennant Number	Builder	Laid Down	Launched	Commissioned	Status
ROKS Dosan Ahn Changho	SS-083	Daewoo Shipbuilding & Marine Engineering (DSME)	17 May 2016	14 September 2018	13 August 2021	Active
ROKS Ahn Mu	SS-085	Daewoo Shipbuilding & Marine Engineering (DSME)	17 April 2018	10 November 2020	20 April 2023	Active
ROKS Shin Chae-ho	SS-086	HD Hyundai Heavy Industries (HHI)	11 April 2019	28 September 2021	4 April 2024	Active

== Gallery ==
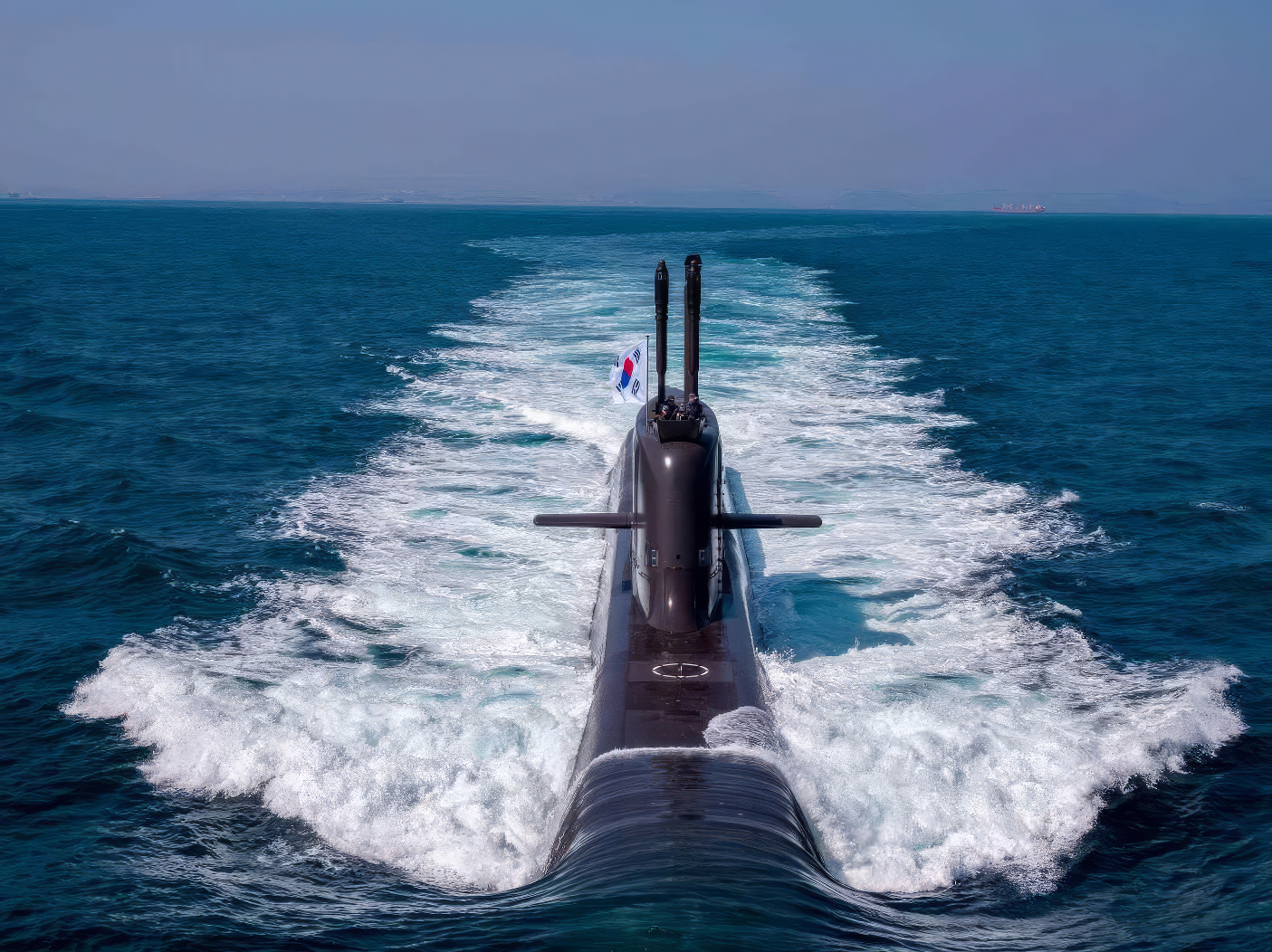

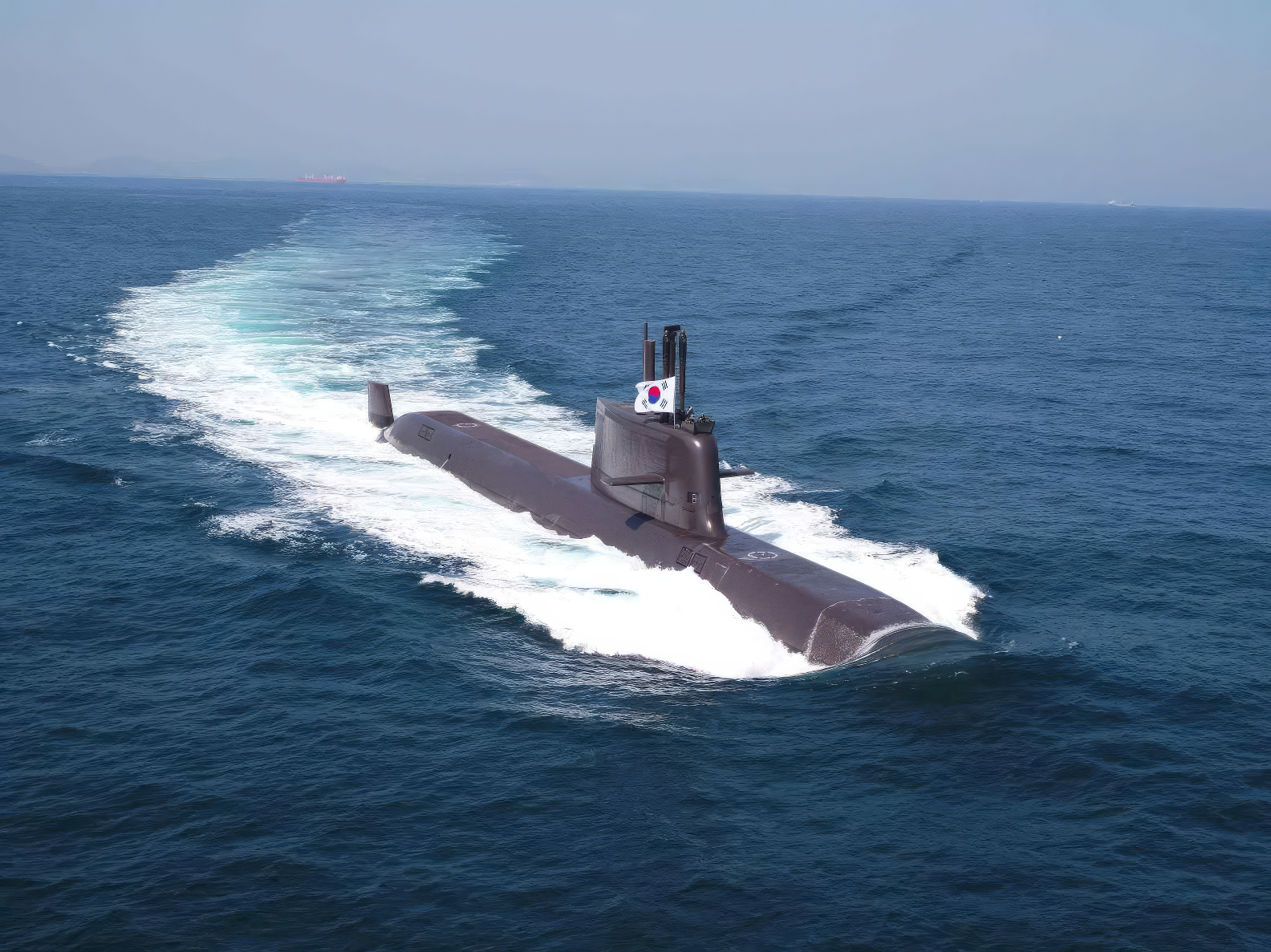

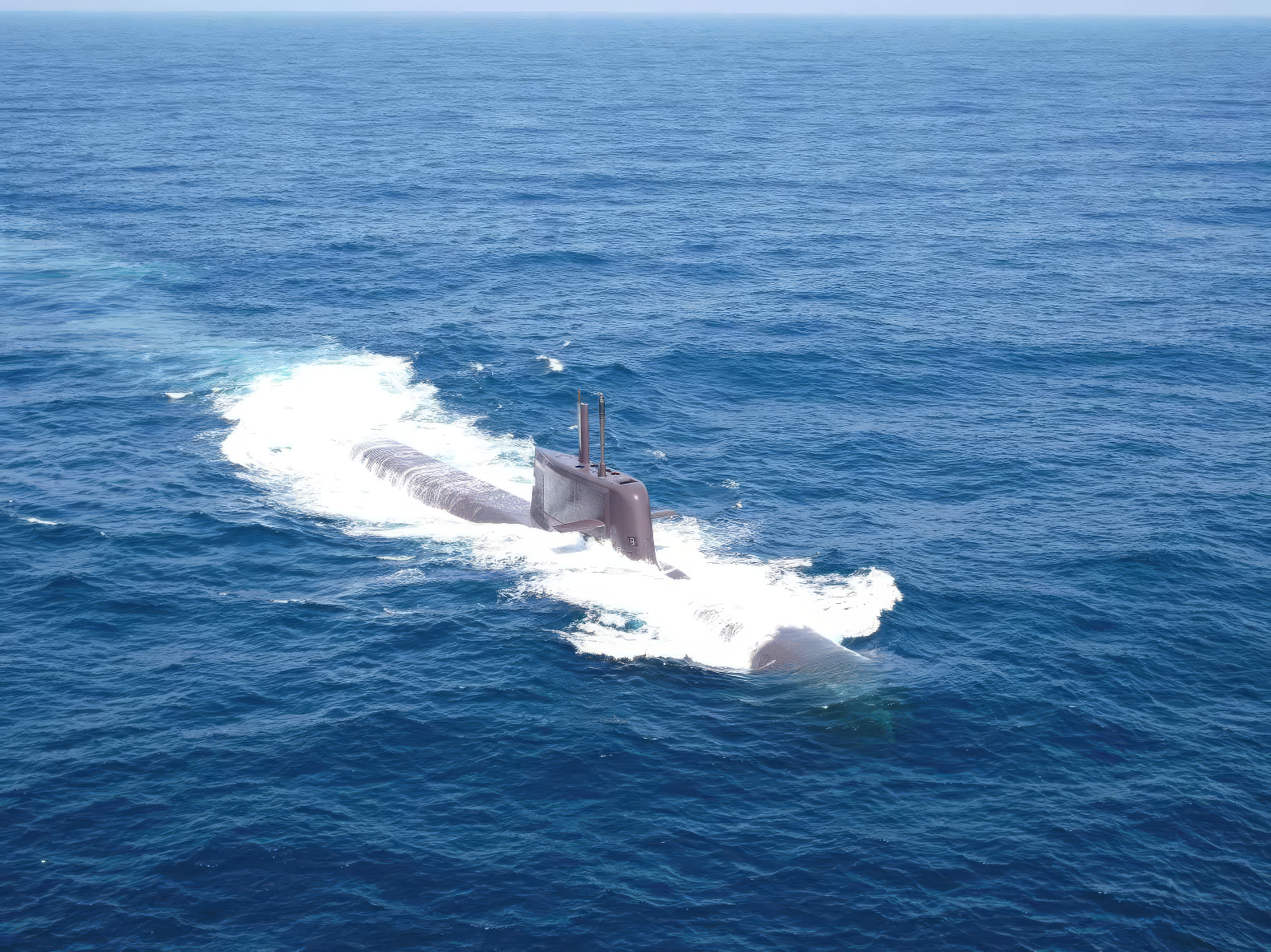

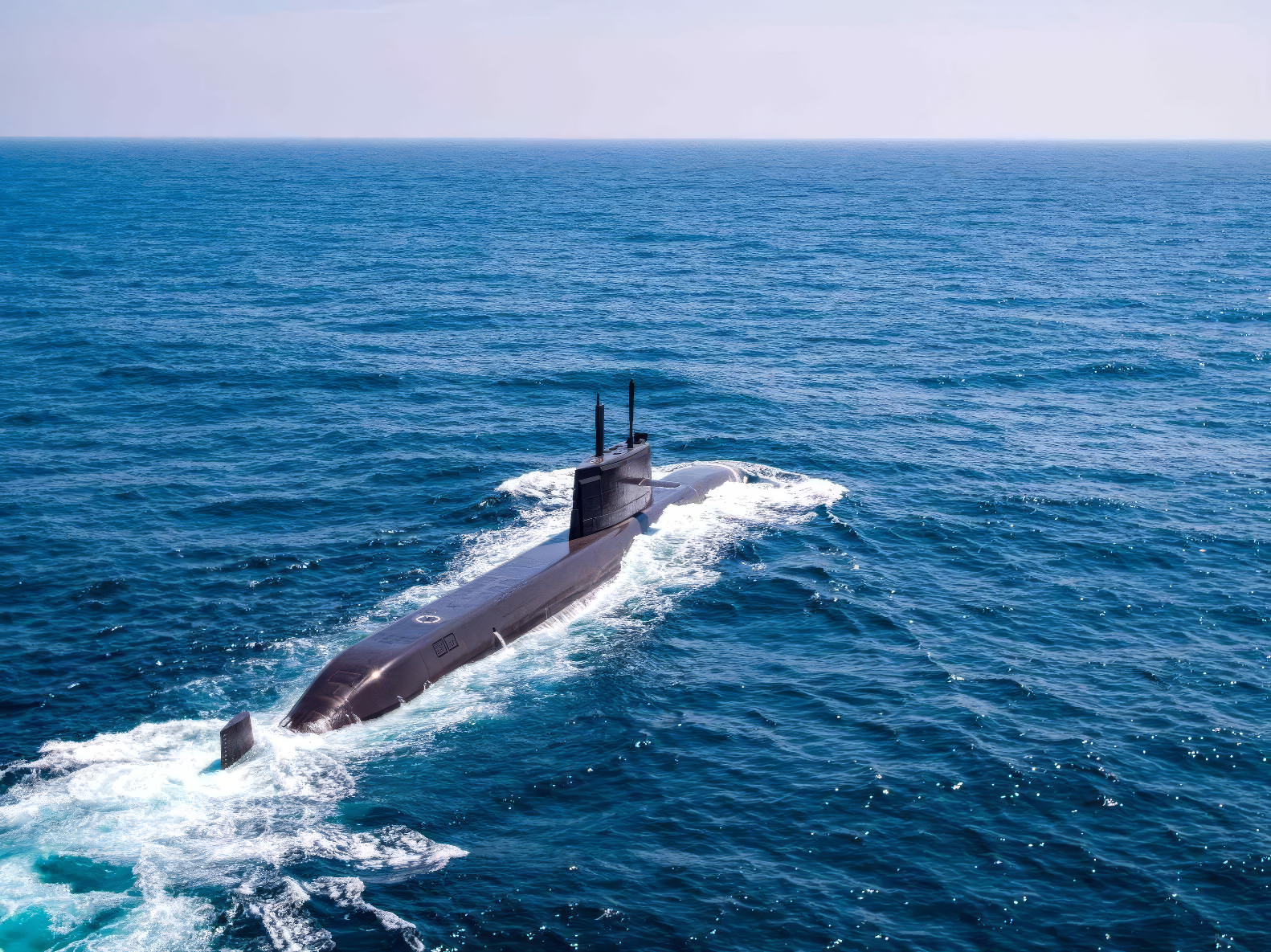

== See also ==
=== Submarines of similar era and comparison ===
- Blekinge-class submarine - A class of next-generation attack submarines developed by Kockums for the Swedish Navy.
- Dakar-class submarine - A unique class of diesel-electric attack-submarines developed by ThyssenKrupp Marine Systems and currently being built for Israel.
- Hai Kun-class submarine - A class of diesel-electric attack-submarines currently being built by CSBC for Taiwan.
- Lada-class submarine - A class of diesel-electric attack-submarines developed by Rubin Design Bureau for Russia.
- Scorpène-class submarine - A class of export-oriented diesel-electric attack-submarines, jointly developed in France by Naval Group and Navantia and currently operated by the Chilean Navy, the Royal Malaysian Navy, the Indian Navy and the Brazilian Navy.
- Sōryū-class submarine - A class of diesel-electric attack-submarines developed by Mitsubishi Heavy Industries and Kawasaki Shipbuilding Corporation for the Japan Maritime Self-Defense Force.
- S-80 Plus submarine - A class of conventionally-powered attack-submarines developed by Navantia for the Spanish Navy.
- Taigei-class submarine - A class of diesel-electric attack submarines currently being built by Mitsubishi Heavy Industries and Kawasaki Heavy Industries for the Japan Maritime Self-Defense Force.
- Type 212CD submarine - An exclusive class of attack submarines developed by ThyssenKrupp Marine Systems for the German Navy and the Royal Norwegian Navy.
- Type 218SG submarine - An exclusive class of attack submarines developed by ThyssenKrupp Marine Systems for the Republic of Singapore Navy.
- Orka-class submarine - A class of diesel-electric attack-submarines based on the Shortfin Barracuda (submarine) developed by Naval Group for the Royal Netherlands Navy to replace the aging Walrus-class submarine.

=== Other references to the Republic of Korea Navy ===
- List of active Republic of Korea Navy ships
