= Russian submarine Sankt Peterburg =

Russian Lada-class submarine

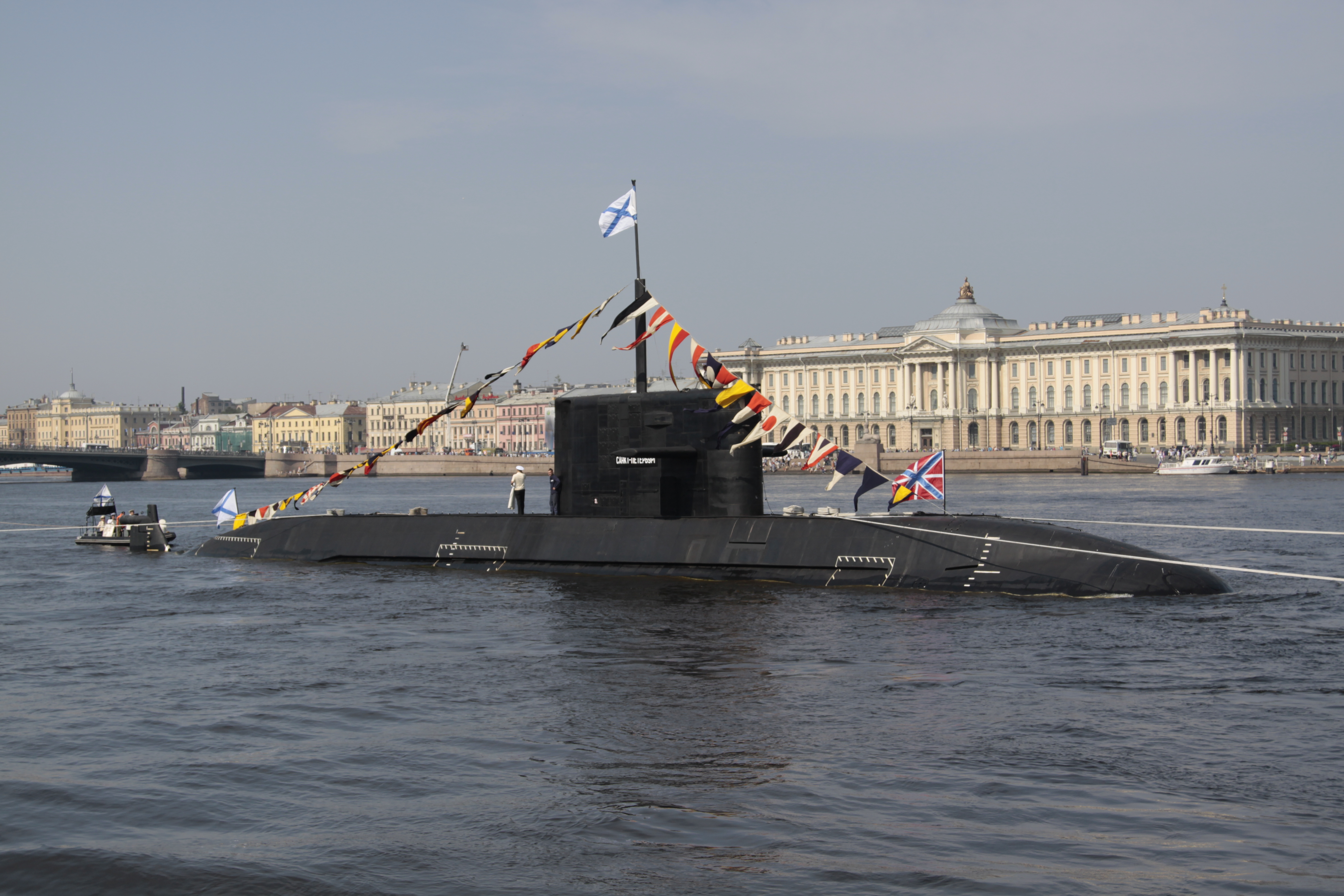
- Sankt Peterburg in 2010

History

Russia
- Name: B-585 Sankt Peterburg
- Namesake: City of Saint Petersburg
- Ordered: Unknown
- Builder: Admiralty Shipyard
- Laid down: 26 December 1997
- Launched: 28 October 2004
- Commissioned: 8 May 2010
- Decommissioned: 5 February 2024
- Status: Decommissioned, to be scrapped

General characteristics
- Class & type: Lada-class diesel-electric submarine
- Displacement: 2,800 tons submerged; 1,675 tons surfaced
- Beam: 7.1 m (23 ft 4 in)
- Draft: 6.5 m (21 ft 4 in)
- Speed: 10 knots (19 km/h; 12 mph) surfaced; 21 knots (39 km/h; 24 mph) submerged
- Range: 1,050 km (650 mi) submerged at cruising speed
- Endurance: 45 days
- Test depth: 300 m (984 ft)
- Complement: 35
- Armament: 6 × 533 mm (21 in) torpedo tubes for 18 × torpedoes or missiles or 44 × naval mines

B-585 Sankt Peterburg (Russian: Б-585 «Санкт-Петербург»; named after Saint Petersburg) is the lead boat of the Lada-class submarines of the Russian Navy. The Lada class is the fourth generation of diesel-electric submarines designed and constructed in the former Soviet Union and Russia to replace the Kilo class. Construction of the boat started in December 1997, and she was launched in October 2004. After undergoing a series of sea trials, Sankt Peterburg was commissioned in May 2010. However, the Russian Navy decided not to accept the St. Petersburg class after it was discovered that the boat's propulsion and sonar systems were inadequate. After design corrections the submarine was accepted. In 2014, Sankt Peterburg joined the Northern Fleet. In 2023, it was reported that due to the extremely high costs of modernising the submarine, the Sankt Peterburg was to be decommissioned and scrapped, with the funds being diverted to new submarine construction.

== Background and construction ==
Sankt Peterburg is first boat of Rubin Design Bureau's Lada class, of which a total of eight were expected to be procured by the Russian Navy. A less capable version, the Amur class, is marketed for export. Designed during the 1990s, the St. Petersburg class is intended to be the successor to the larger Kilo class. The Kilo class is considered to be one of the quietest diesel classes in operations, giving rise to the nickname "Black Hole". St. Petersburg-class boats can also conduct reconnaissance and defend naval facilities and sea lanes.

Amid a severe shortage of funds experienced during the 1990s following the dissolution of the Soviet Union, the keel of Sankt Peterburg was laid down on 26 December 1997, in Saint Petersburg by Admiralty Shipyard, and launched on 28 October 2004, to coincide with the 300th anniversary of Sankt Peterburg's founding, before undergoing several sea trials, to validate her systems, until 2009.

As of 25 February 2008, Sankt Peterburg was part of the 13th Brigade of Ships Under Repair and Construction Leningrad Naval Base.

== Operational history ==
On 6 May 2010, Sankt Peterburg was commissioned into the Russian Navy, signalling the official start of her operational service. The boat thereafter underwent combat training with the Baltic Fleet and participated in a naval parade and an exercise. At the same time, she continued sea trials until late 2011.

Despite having been commissioned, in November 2011 the Russian Navy decided that the St. Petersburg class would not be accepted into service, as Sankt Peterburg had fallen far short of requirements during trials. According to Izvestia, the main drawback was the propulsion unit's inability to produce half of the expected power, along with the inefficiency of the sonar system. With the construction of the other two St. Petersburg-class submarines being halted, the Russian Navy ordered additional Improved Kilo-class submarines. The decision to reject the St. Petersburg class was confirmed in February 2012 by Russian Navy Commander-in-Chief Admiral Vladimir Vysotsky, who stated, "The Russian Navy does not need the St. Petersburg in its current form." Sankt Peterburg would remain an experimental prototype.

Sankt Peterburg successfully carried a missile launch in accordance with the combat training schedule in the Barents Sea. The cruise missile was launched from an underwater position at a naval target on 17 November 2016. Tests were successfully finished in December 2018.

Nevertheless, as of 2020, the submarine continued to be used as a test platform for the class and according to one report, was noted not to be fully operational. On 18 April 2023, it was reported that Sankt Peterburg is planned to be decommissioned, as its modernisation is very expensive and a new submarine could be built using those funds. On 5 February 2024, the submarine was withdrawn from the navy.
