= Blekinge-class submarine =

Future class of Swedish Navy submarines

Class overview
- Name: Blekinge class
- Builders: Saab Kockums (Karlskrona shipyard)
- Operators: Future operators: Swedish Navy Polish Navy
- Preceded by: Gotland class
- Succeeded by: Projekt A30
- Cost: SEK 25 billion (2025) for 2 units; SEK 12.5 billion (2025) per unit; US$1.31 billion (2025) per unit
- In service: Planned to enter service in 2031 / 2033
- Planned: Sweden: 2; Poland: 3
- Building: 3
- Completed: 0

General characteristics
- Type: Hunter-killer submarine (ISR, seabed operations)
- Displacement: 1,925 tonnes (surfaced); 2,100 tonnes (submerged)
- Length: 66.1 m (216 ft 10 in)
- Beam: 6.75 m (22 ft 2 in)
- Draught: 6 m (19 ft 8 in)
- Decks: 2
- Propulsion: 1 shaft with 1 propeller, driven by: Stirling engines (AIP): 4 × Kockums MkV V4-275R; Diesel engines (diesel-electric): 2 × engines; Electric propulsion: Jeumont Electric solutions
- Speed: 6 kn (11 km/h) on AIP; 20 km/h (12 mph) on diesel-electric propulsion
- Endurance: 45 days (18 days underwater with AIP)
- Complement: 17–26 (35 with special forces)
- Sensors & processing systems: Sonars: Atlas Elektronik (Sweden); Elac Sonar (Poland); Bow sonar; Conform flank array sonar; HF intercept sonar arrays; Kongsberg; SA9510S Mine Avoidance and Navigation Sonar; EM2040 multibeam echo sounder, side-scan sonar, sub-bottom profiler and hydrographic echo sounders; Masts: Periscope (Poland); Sagem Safran Series 30 optronic surveillance mast (Sweden and Poland); Drones (deported sensors): Saab LUUV (Larger uncrewed underwater vehicle)
- Armament: Torpedoes: 4 × 533 mm (21 in) torpedo tubes, with Torped 62 steg 2, or Torped 63; 2 × 400 mm (16 in) torpedo tubes, with: Torped 47 (Saab SLWT); Naval mines (in development); Missiles JSM-SL (in development)
- Notes: Multi-mission Portal used to launch special forces and larger underwater drones

The Blekinge-class submarine is the next generation of submarines developed by Kockums for the Swedish Navy and also ordered by Poland for the Polish Navy. It is also known as the A26 type.

First planned at the beginning of the 1990s, the project was called "U-båt 2000" and was intended to be ready by the late 1990s or early 2000. With the end of the Cold War the naval threat from the Soviet Union disappeared and the new submarine class was deemed unnecessary. The project lay dormant for years until the mid-2000s when the need for a replacement for the Södermanland class became apparent. Originally the Scandinavian countries had intended to collaborate on the Viking class, but Denmark's withdrawal from submarine operations meant that Kockums proceeded on their own.

In February 2014, the project was cancelled because of disagreements between Kockums's new German owners, ThyssenKrupp, and the Swedish government. ThyssenKrupp refused to send a complete offer to any potential buyer and demanded that each buyer pay for the entire development rather than sharing the cost. The cancellation resulted in the Kockums equipment repossession incident on 8 April 2014. As per protocol, the Swedish government repossessed all equipment belonging to Defence Materiel Administration (Sweden), as well as all secret blueprints and images, using an armed escort. By orders from a manager, Kockums staff tried to sabotage the repossession by locking the gates with the repossession crew and escort still inside.

On 18 March 2015, Maritime Today reported that the project was restarted after the Swedish government placed a formal order for two A26 submarines for a maximum total cost of SEK 8.2 bn (approximately US$945 million as of 18 March 2015). According to the article, a Letter of Intent (LOI) had earlier been signed by Saab and FMV (The Swedish Defence Material Administration) in June 2014 regarding the Swedish Armed Forces’ underwater capability for the period 2015–2024. Saab has since acquired Kockums. The order in question for the two A26 submarines has been placed with what is now "Saab Kockums." These were to be delivered no later than 2022, a date subsequently pushed back, initially to 2024–25 and subsequently even further to 2027–28. In October 2025, the delivery date was announced to be pushed back further to 2031 and 2033.

== History ==
On 25 February 2010, Kockums AB signed a contract with the Swedish Defence Materiel Administration (FMV) concerning the overall design phase of the next-generation submarine. Kockums CEO, Ola Alfredsson, stated "This is an important first step, not only for Kockums, but for the Swedish Armed Forces as a whole. We shall now be able to maintain our position at the cutting edge of submarine technology, which is vital in the light of current threat scenarios."

On 11 April 2010, the Swedish Defence minister Sten Tolgfors announced plans to acquire two new submarines to be commissioned in 2018–19 replacing the two submarines of the Södermanland class. The plans also included a Mid-Life Upgrade program of two submarines of the Gotland class. Additional submarines could later be ordered to replace the Gotland class, however this will not be decided before 2020.

On 16 June 2010, the Swedish Parliament authorised the government to procure two new submarines. Kockums states that construction of two A26 submarines will generate about 170 jobs.

The first submarine was planned to be laid down by the end of 2012, but as of 2013, no submarines have yet been ordered. In September 2013 it was announced that the project had been delayed because of construction issues and the first submarine would not be ready before 2020.

=== Order cancelled and alternatives ===
On 27 February 2014, the Swedish Defence Materiel Administration (FMV) cancelled its plans to order the A26 submarine from Kockums. According to FMV the new Kockums owner, the German company Thyssen Krupp has refused to allow Sweden to share the cost with any other nation, making the submarine too expensive. Sweden has instead approached Saab. Saab plans to rehire many of Kockums submarine engineers if they receive orders for a new submarine. As a result, Saab recruited top people from Kockums and issued a press release that the company was seeking employees for its naval division. In a letter to the Swedish Defence Materiel Administration, FMV, the head of the German ThyssenKrupp Marine Division, Dr. Hans Atzpodien begs FMV to stop Saab from recruiting key personnel from Kockums. On 2 April 2014 the Swedish government officially terminated all talks about a deal with ThyssenKrupp.

On 14 April 2014, about 200 employees had left Thyssen Krupp for Saab and it was reported that Saab and Thyssen Krupp had started to negotiate about selling Kockums. In June 2014 Thyssen Krupp agreed to sell Kockums to Saab.

On 22 July 2014, it was announced that Saab had bought Kockums from Thyssen Krupp for 340 million SEK. The new name will be Saab Kockums.

=== Swedish purchase ===
In June 2015, as the Swedish defence minister, Peter Hultqvist was visiting the facilities of Saab Kockums, it was announced that two contracts were signed, one including the MLU of two submarines of the Gotland class, and the other for the purchase of two submarines, worth SEK 8.2 billion (USD $956 million). Back in 2015, the plan was to deliver the two ships in 2022 and in 2024.

In January 2019, the FMV announced that the submarines would be delivered in 2024 and 2025.

In August 2021, the FMV and Saab renegotiated the contract as the costs rose, and the programme was seeing schedule slips. This new agreement included as well capabilities improvements. The order for the pursuit of the development and the production of the two A26 reached SEK 5.2 billion (USD $600 million) for a total cost between the first and second agreement of 14 billion (2021 price level). The delivery was then planned for 2027 and 2028.

In October 2025, a new agreement was made between the FMV and Saab. This new agreement has a new timeline with deliveries in 2031 and 2033, and a fixed cost ceiling of SEK 25 billion.

== Design ==
=== Initial design ===
The new submarine project was intended to be an improved version of the Gotland-class submarine, which will be considered obsolete around 2015–2017 according to Per Skantz, development co-ordinator at the Marine headquarters in Stockholm. The submarine would displace 1,900 tonnes and have a crew complement of between 17 and 31 men. The 2008–2010 military budget memorandum to the Minister for Defence by the Supreme Commander, Håkan Syrén, would require the type to cost no more than the current Gotland-class (about SEK1.5 billion). The new submarine would have blue water capability, something earlier Swedish submarines have lacked. It will be equipped with modified AIP stirling propulsion and GHOST (Genuine HOlistic STealth) technology, making the submarine extremely quiet. It will also be designed to withstand significant shock loads from underwater explosions and would be able to "launch and recover vehicles" through its torpedo tubes. The submarine's sail would largely be composed of the same material that was used when constructing the Visby-class corvettes.

=== Swedish design updated ===
==== Propulsion ====
The A26 Blekinge will be equipped with the fifth generation of the Saab Kockums AIP (Stirling engine), the Kockums MkV V4-275R.

==== Weapon systems ====
Saab will implement the "Autonomous Ocean Core" an AI system of systems that will support the crew in:

- navigation
- sensor fusion
- electronic warfare
- synchronise / operate the unmanned systems in coordination with the crewed systems.

==== Sensors ====
The first sensor ordered was the Safran Series 30 SOM (Search Optronic Mast). This mast was already ordered as part of the Gotland-class MLU.

==== Ship on-bord systems ====
The company FAMOR S.A. will supply consoles for the ships of the class. These consoles will be used to operate the ships, and are separate from the weapon system.

==== Weapons ====
The main weapon will be the torpedoes:

- 4 × 533 mm (21 in) torpedo tubes that will use the Torped 62 steg 2, and the Torped 63.
- 2 × 400 mm (16 in) torpedo tubes that will use the Torped 47 (Saab SLWT).

=== Variants for export ===
Saab Kockums offers three variants with different sizes and expected roles:

- Pelagic
- Oceanic
- Oceanic (Extended Range)

The entire Blekinge-class submarine family has been offered for export, equipped with 18 vertical launch cells for Tomahawk cruise missiles. The VLS would be an added module to the submarine

== Boats ==
Name	No.	Status	Contract	Keel laid down	Launched	Comm.	Homeport	Notes
Swedish Navy
HSwMS Blekinge	–	Under construction	30 Jun 2015	30 Jun 2022	–	2031	Preliminary Göteborg	
HSwMS Skåne	–	Under construction	30 Jun 2015		–	2033	Preliminary Göteborg	
Polish Navy
	–	Ordered by Poland	29 Jun 2026		–	2032	Gdynia	
	–	Ordered by Poland	29 Jun 2026		–	2035	Gdynia	
	–	Ordered by Poland	29 Jun 2026		–	2038	Gdynia	

Planned commissioning

== Export ==
=== Future operators ===
==== Poland ====
The Polish Navy is replacing its Orzeł submarine with the three A26 submarines in the Orka programme which was restarted in 2023. The A26 was selected in 2025. And the order for three submarines was placed in June 2026, worth SEK47 billion. The fourth submarine HSwMS Södermanland will be handed over in 2027 and serve until the new A26 submarine will enter the service.

=== Potential clients ===
==== Greece ====
In May 2025, the Hellenic Navy outlined the expectations for a new generation of submarines. In July 2025, Greece formalised a 12-year modernisation plan worth US$25 billion. This includes the start of a formal process to acquire four submarines to replace its oldest four submarines, 1 Glavkos class (Type 209/1100) and 3 Poseidon class (Type 209/1200).

The known competitors for this programme include:

- Barracuda class (Naval Group)
- KSS-III Batch II class (Hanwha Ocean / HD Hyundai Heavy Industries)
- Scorpene class (Naval group)
- Type 209NG class (TKMS)
- Type 212CD class (TKMS)
- Type 218 class (TKMS)
- U212 NFS class (Fincantieri / TKMS)

==== Chile ====
Saab offered the A26 Blekinge to the Chilean Navy.

=== Failed bids ===
==== Australia ====
On 12 September 2014, Saab Kockums proposed a 4,000-ton variant of the submarine, known as the Type 612, for the Royal Australian Navy to replace their ageing Collins-class submarines. The DCNS (now Naval Group) offer based on the Shortfin Barracuda-class submarine was selected instead, however this deal was later rescinded.

==== Canada ====
A derivative of the Blekinge, the C-71 Expeditionary submarine was offered to the Canadian Navy, but two submarines were pre-selected, the Type 212CD, and the South Korean submarine KSS III. This submarine was offered by a collaboration of Saab and Damen.

==== Netherlands ====
In December 2014 an agreement was announced by Saab and Damen Shipyards for the joint development of the next-generation of submarines, based on the Type 612 design).

This cooperation was Initially focused on replacing the four Walrus-class submarines currently in use by the Royal Netherlands Navy. But in March 2024, the Netherlands selected the Barracuda-class submarines from Naval Group. TKMS, the other competitor in the programme objected in court against the selection of the Barracuda, but the court upheld the decision of the Ministry of Defence (July 2024). The contract for the purchase of the four submarines was signed in September 2024.

==== Norway ====
The Royal Norwegian Navy had shown interest in the project, but ended up ordering the Type 212CD submarine from ThyssenKrupp Marine Systems.

== See also ==
- List of submarine classes in service

Equivalent submarines of the same era

- U212 NFS
- Type 218SG
- Lada class
- Hai Kun class
- Dolphin II class
