= ROKS Dosan Ahn Chang-ho =

Dosan Ahn Changho-class submarine

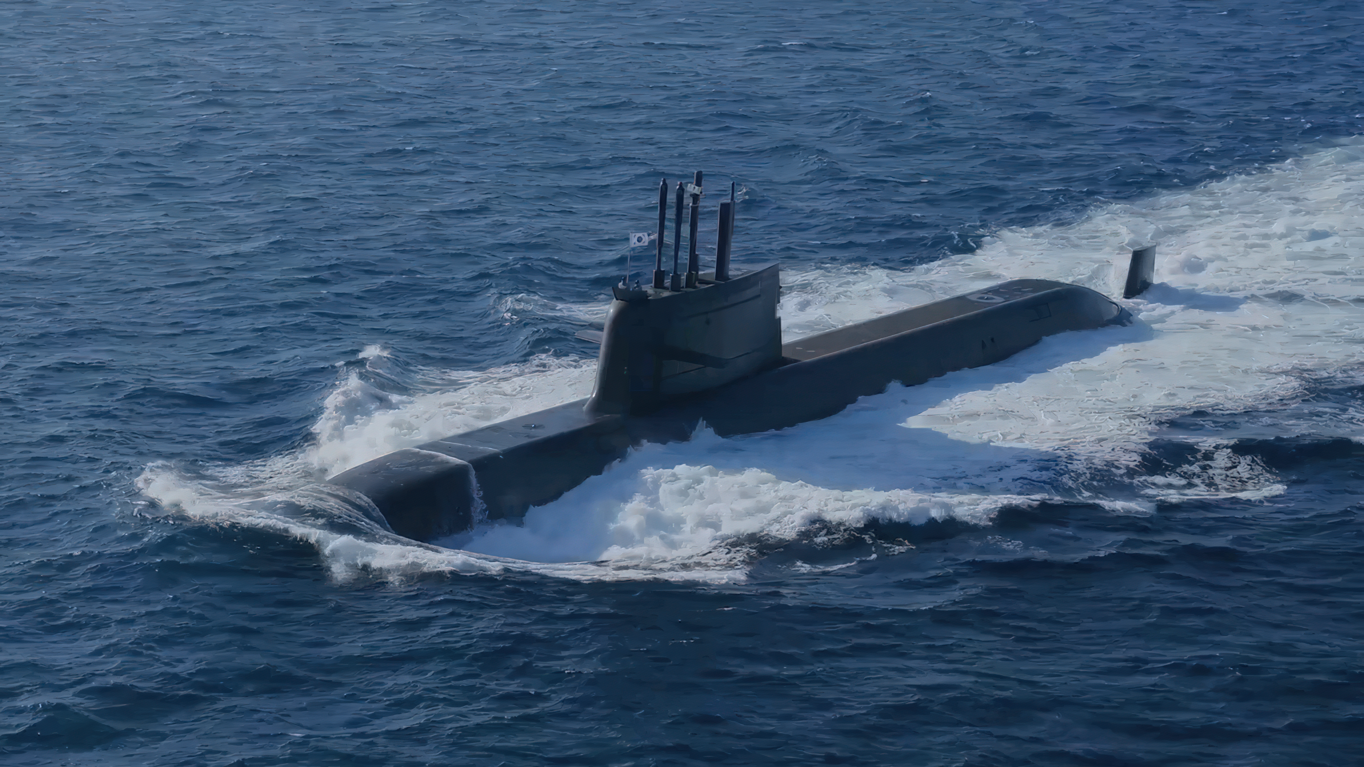
- ROKS Dosan Ahn Chang-ho

History

South Korea
- Name: Dosan Ahn Chang-ho; (도산안창호)
- Namesake: Dosan Ahn Chang-ho
- Builder: DSME, Geoje
- Laid down: 17 May 2016
- Launched: 14 September 2018
- Commissioned: 13 August 2021
- Identification: Pennant number: SS-083
- Status: Fitting out

General characteristics
- Class & type: Dosan Ahn Changho-class submarine
- Displacement: 3,358 tons surfaced; 3,750 tons submerged
- Length: 83.5 m (273 ft 11 in)
- Beam: 9.6 m (31 ft 6 in)
- Draught: 7.62 m (25 ft 0 in)
- Propulsion: Diesel-electric, low noise skew back propeller; 4 x Bumhan Industry PH1 PEM fuel cell each with 150 kW
- Speed: 12 knots (22 km/h; 14 mph) surfaced; 20 knots (37 km/h; 23 mph) submerged
- Range: 10,000 nmi (19,000 km; 12,000 mi)
- Endurance: 50 days
- Complement: 50
- Armament: 6 x 533 mm (21 in) torpedo tubes (Tiger Shark torpedo and Harpoon); 6 x VLS tubes (Cruise and ballistic missile)

ROKS Dosan Ahn Chang-ho (SS-083) is the lead ship of Dosan Ahn Changho-class submarines. She was commissioned on 13 August 2021.

== Development and design ==
The Dosan Ahn Chang-ho class are equipped with the Korean Vertical Launching System which will be able to carry up to ten indigenous "Chonryong" land-attack cruise missiles and "Hyunmoo" submarine-launched ballistic missiles (SLBM), becoming the first submarines in the South Korean navy to have this kind of capability. They will also have many other improvements compared to their predecessors built with a greater degree of South Korean technology, especially in the later batches, which will include Samsung SDI lithium-ion batteries. Measured to displace over 3,800 tonnes (3,700 long tons) submerged during sea trials, they are the largest conventional submarines ever built by South Korea. The Batch II vessels will increase their displacement by approximately 450 t (440 long tons) (4,250 t, 4,180 long tons submerged), according to the Defense Acquisition Program Administration.

== Construction and career ==
Dosan Ahn Chang-ho was laid down on 17 May 2016 at DSME, Geoje and launched on 14 September 2018. She began her sea trials in 2019 and was commissioned on 13 August 2021. On 15 September 2021, she was reported to have successfully fired a new submarine launched ballistic missile (SLBM) while submerged.
