= Project Kalina =

Russian proposed fifth-generation submarine

Class overview
- Name: Project Kalina
- Builders: Rubin Design Bureau, Titan, Sevmash
- Operators: (Russia) Russian Navy
- Preceded by: Lada class

General characteristics
- Type: Attack submarine
- Propulsion: Diesel ?, electric, Kristall-27E (or another) AIP O2 H2 fuel cells (Rubin Krylov Nevskoe) Elektrosila Zvezda ZE LEMZ NPO Aurora
- Armament: torpedo, mines ?, missile VLS and by horizontal tubes

Project Kalina is a proposed fifth-generation diesel-electric submarine currently being developed by TsKB Rubin and others, for the Russian Navy. It will be fitted with air-independent propulsion technology, and copies may also be sold to China.

As of 2021, the project had lost government funding, according to the Russian state-owned RIA Novosti news agency. As a result, it was being self-funded by Rubin, the developer.

== See also ==
- List of Soviet and Russian submarine classes
- Future of the Russian Navy
- Cruise missile submarine
- Attack submarine
