= Torped 62 =

- Type: Heavyweight torpedo
- Place of origin: Sweden

Service history
- Used by: Sweden

Specifications
- Mass: 1,400 kg (3,100 lb)
- Length: 5,990 mm (236 in)
- Diameter: 533 mm (21.0 in)
- Maximum firing range: +50 km (27 nmi)
- Warhead: high explosive
- Engine: Pump jet
- Propellant: Kerosene and Hydrogen peroxide
- Maximum depth: >500 m
- Maximum speed: 45 kn (83 km/h)
- Launch platform: Gotland class; Södermanland class; Future A26 submarine

Torped 62 is a torpedo used by the Swedish Navy, possibly to be in-use until the mid-2040s.

In the late 1980s, FFV (today Saab Dynamics AB), began to develop a replacement for the older Torped 613, the main heavy torpedo used by the Swedish navy. In 1991 the company was awarded a contract of 200 million SEK to complete development of the torpedo. Scheduled to enter service in the mid 1990s, different problems delayed the torpedo for several years. In 2001 the first torpedoes was delivered to the Swedish Defence Material Administration (FMV) for early testing. The first batch was delivered to the Swedish armed forces in 2004 and was officially handed over to the Swedish Navy by early 2010.

The torpedo has a pump jet propulsion system giving it a maximum speed of over 45+ knots. It can also track several targets and classify them at the same.

In 2020 Saab received a first order from the Swedish Defence Materiel Administration (FMV) for the life extension of the heavyweight torpedo system. The order value is approximately 485 MSEK, with deliveries from 2020 to 2024. This order ensures continuing development of the heavy torpedo, with the possibility for the Torpedo 62 to remain in operation with the Swedish Navy until the mid-2040s.

In 2021 Saab received an order from the Swedish Defence Material Organisation (FMV) for the next phase of the life extension programme of Torpedo 62. The order value is SEK 145 million, with deliveries by the end of 2023. The order includes pre-studies and engineering which incorporates subsystem prototypes for improvements of the current torpedo.
