= U212 NFS submarine =

Attack submarine in the Italian Navy

Class overview
- Name: Mameli class - U212 NFS; U212 NFS EVO
- Builders: Fincantieri S.p.A.
- Operators: Future operator: Italian Navy
- Preceded by: Sauro class submarine
- Succeeded by: Next Generation Submarine
- Cost: NFS1 and NFS2 (including training center and development): €1.35 billion; NFS3: €500 million (+ €160 million of budget for additional developments); NFS4: €500 million
- Built: Since 2022
- Planned: 6
- Building: 4
- Completed: 0

General characteristics
- Type: Attack submarine
- Displacement: U212 NFS: Surfaced: 1,600 tonnes (1,600 long tons); Submerged: 1,780 tonnes (1,750 long tons); U212 NFS Evo: Submerged: 2,000 tonnes (2,000 long tons)
- Length: 59 metres (193 ft 7 in)
- Beam: 7 metres (23 ft 0 in)
- Height: 12 metres (39 ft 4 in)
- Decks: 2
- Propulsion: Energy generation: Diesel generator: 1 × MTU 16V-396 3,120 kW (4,180 hp) with a Piller Group alternator; AIP - PEM fuel cells (extending the time underwater); Energy storage: Lithium Battery System (LBS) (supplied by POWER4FUTURE S.p.A.); Propulsion: Propulsion motor: Permasyn Type FR6439-3900 (Siemens) 3,900 kW (5,200 hp); Propeller: Fixed pitch, low noise
- Speed: > 20 kn (37 km/h)
- Complement: 29 (+ capacity for 8 special forces)
- Sensors & processing systems: Systems: Combat management system: Leonardo’s ATHENA MK2/U; Autopilot system by Avio Aero; Sonar suite: Sphere-based Kaleidoscope 2.0 integrated sonar suite by ELAC SONAR; FAS (flank array sonar); CAS (cylindrical array sonar); MAS (mine avoidance sonar); CIA (Cylindrical intercept array); ONA HYD (own noise analysis hydrophones); SBE 1 (sonar beacon / distress pinger); SB 3050 2G (multi-beam echosounder); VE 5900 (naval echosounder); UT3000 2G (underwater communication system); Masts supplied by L3Harris and Calzoni: Communication; electro-optical system
- Electronic warfare & decoys: Above water EW: RESM/CESM on mast by Elettronica; Under water EW: WASS countermeasures
- Armament: Weapon launching systems: 6 × 533 mm (21.0 in) torpedo tubes; Torpedoes: Leonardo Black Shark Advanced heavyweight torpedo; Missiles: Land attack cruise missiles (long-range / deep strike); UUV (unmanned underwater vessel):

As part of the development of the Italian Navy submarine force for the period 2025 - 2050, the Mameli class - U212 NFS (Near Future Submarine) and the U212 NFS EVO are being developed, for an introduction by 2036. By then, the Italian Navy will be equipped with four Todaro class (the U212A), four U212 NFS, and two U212 NFS EVO.

The Italian Navy is already preparing the development of the successor of the U212A, the NGS (New Generation Submarine) that will replace the U212A and that will start to be built from 2040. The Italian Navy is also developing a LDAUV (Large Displacement Autonomous Underwater Vehicle) to support the submarine force.

== Project history ==
=== U212 NFS ===
In 2018 and 2019, the Italian Parliament released information regarding the funding of the successor of the 4 Sauro class submarines in order to maintain an 8-submarine force.

In November 2020, the Italian ministry of defence released their multi-year planning document (Documento Programmatico Pluriennale) for 2020-2022 It mentions the plan to procure four new submarines in two phases for a total programme cost estimated at €2.68 billion.

The Italian Government mandated OCCAR to manage the U212 NFS programme on its behalf.

==== Phase 1 ====
The phase 1 comprises:

- Development of the U212 NFS submarine class
- Procurement of 2 submarines
- Construction of a training center
- 10 years technical-logistic in-service support

In February 2021, OCCAR and Fincantieri S.p.A. (lead contractor) signed the contract of the phase 1 for €1.35 billion.

==== Phase 2 ====
The phase 2 of the programme has 2 submarines that were to be purchased as an option. It includes:

- Complementary development of the class
- Procurement of 2 submarines
- 10 years technical-logistic in-service support for the 2 additional submarines

In December 2022, OCCAR committed to a third U212 NFS submarine. In July 2023, the contract was signed for a value of €500 million, and a complementary budget of €160 million for additional developments was also included in the contract.

The fourth U212 NFS was ordered in June 2024 for a value of €500 million.

=== U212 NFS EVO ===
In June 2024, the Italian Navy unveiled its plan for the fleet development for the period 2025 - 2050. It includes the development of a sub-class of the U212 NFS which will be larger (> 2,000 tonnes) and which will integrate technologies in development for the successor of the Todaro class, the NGS (Next Generation Submarine).

== Ships of the class ==
Name	No.	Type	Builder	Contract	Steel cutting	Laid down	Launched	Comm.	Homeport
Italian Navy
Goffredo Mameli	S530	NFS	Fincantieri (Muggiano, La Spezia)	26 Feb 2021	11 Jan 2022	27 Feb 2026	–	2027	Taranto Submarine Base
Pietro Calvi	S531	NFS	Fincantieri (Muggiano, La Spezia)	26 Feb 2021	6 Jun 2023	1 Oct 2026	–	Jan 2029	Taranto Submarine Base
Enrico Tazzoli	S532	NFS	Fincantieri (Muggiano, La Spezia)	21 Jul 2023	27 Jun 2024	–	–	Dec 2030	Taranto Submarine Base
Enrico Toti	S533	NFS	Fincantieri (Muggiano, La Spezia)	27 Jun 2024	12 Dec 2025	–	–	Jan 2032	Taranto Submarine Base
–	–	NFS EVO	Fincantieri (Muggiano, La Spezia)	–	–	–	–	2036	–
–	–	NFS EVO	Fincantieri (Muggiano, La Spezia)	–	–	–	–	2036	–

Planned commissioning
Ships planned

=== Potential operators ===
Greece
The Hellenic Navy is looking for a successor to its fleet of four Type 209 (209/1100 and 209/1200).
The competition involves:
- HHI with its own design
- Hanwha Ocean with the KSS-III
- Naval Group with the Blacksword Barracuda
- Saab Kockums with the A26 Blekinge
- TKMS: with multiple options (Type 209/1400 Mod, Type 212CD, Type 214, Type 218)
Philippines
TKMS and Fincantieri signed an agreement in April 2025 to offer the U212 NFS to the Philippines, as part of the Horizon III modernisation initiative.
Middle East
The CEO of Fincantieri mentioned opportunities for the export of this ship in the Middle East as of June 2025.

=== Failed bids ===
Poland
The Polish Navy planned to purchase 3 attack submarines as part of its Orka programme. The mentioned competitors included the A26 Blekinge, the KSS-III, the S-80, the Scorpene SSK, the U212 NFS and the Type 212CD. Ultimately, the Polish Navy selected the A26 Blekinge in November 2025.

== See also ==
Equivalent submarines of the same era

- Reis class
- Invincible class
- Kalvari class
- Nagapasa class
