= ROKS Ahn Mu =

Dosan Ahn Changho-class submarine

History

South Korea
- Name: Ahn Mu; (안무)
- Namesake: Ahn Mu
- Builder: Daewoo Shipbuilding & Marine Engineering, Geoje
- Laid down: 17 April 2018
- Launched: 10 November 2020
- Commissioned: 20 April 2023
- Identification: Pennant number: SS-085
- Status: Active

General characteristics
- Class & type: Dosan Ahn Changho-class submarine
- Displacement: 3,358 tons surfaced; 3,750 tons submerged
- Length: 83.5 m (273 ft 11 in)
- Beam: 9.6 m (31 ft 6 in)
- Draught: 7.62 m (25 ft 0 in)
- Propulsion: Diesel-electric, low noise skew back propeller; 4 x Bumhan Industry PH1 PEM fuel cell each with 150 kW
- Speed: 12 knots (22 km/h; 14 mph) surfaced; 20 knots (37 km/h; 23 mph) submerged
- Range: 10,000 nmi (19,000 km; 12,000 mi)
- Endurance: 50 days
- Complement: 50
- Armament: 6 x 533 mm (21 in) torpedo tubes (Tiger Shark torpedoes and Harpoon missiles); 6 x VLS tubes (cruise and ballistic missile)

ROKS Ahn Mu (SS-085) is the second ship of Dosan Ahn Changho-class submarines of the Republic of Korea Navy (ROKN).

== Development and design ==
The Dosan Ahn Changho class incorporates the Korean Vertical Launching System which will be able to carry up to ten indigenous "Chonryong" land-attack cruise missiles and "Hyunmoo" submarine-launched ballistic missiles (SLBM), becoming the first submarines in the ROKN to have this kind of capability. They will also have many other improvements compared to their predecessors built with a greater degree of South Korean technology, especially in the later batches, which will include Samsung SDI lithium-ion batteries. Measured to displace over 3,800 tonnes (3,700 long tons) submerged during sea trials, they are the largest conventional submarines ever built by South Korea. The Batch II vessels will increase their displacement by approximately 450 t (440 long tons) (4,250 t, 4,180 long tons submerged), according to the Defense Acquisition Program Administration.

== Construction and career ==
Ahn Mu was laid down on 17 April 2018 at DSME, Geoje and launched on 10 November 2020. She was commissioned on 20 April 2023.
