= Viking-class submarine =

Planned class of submarines

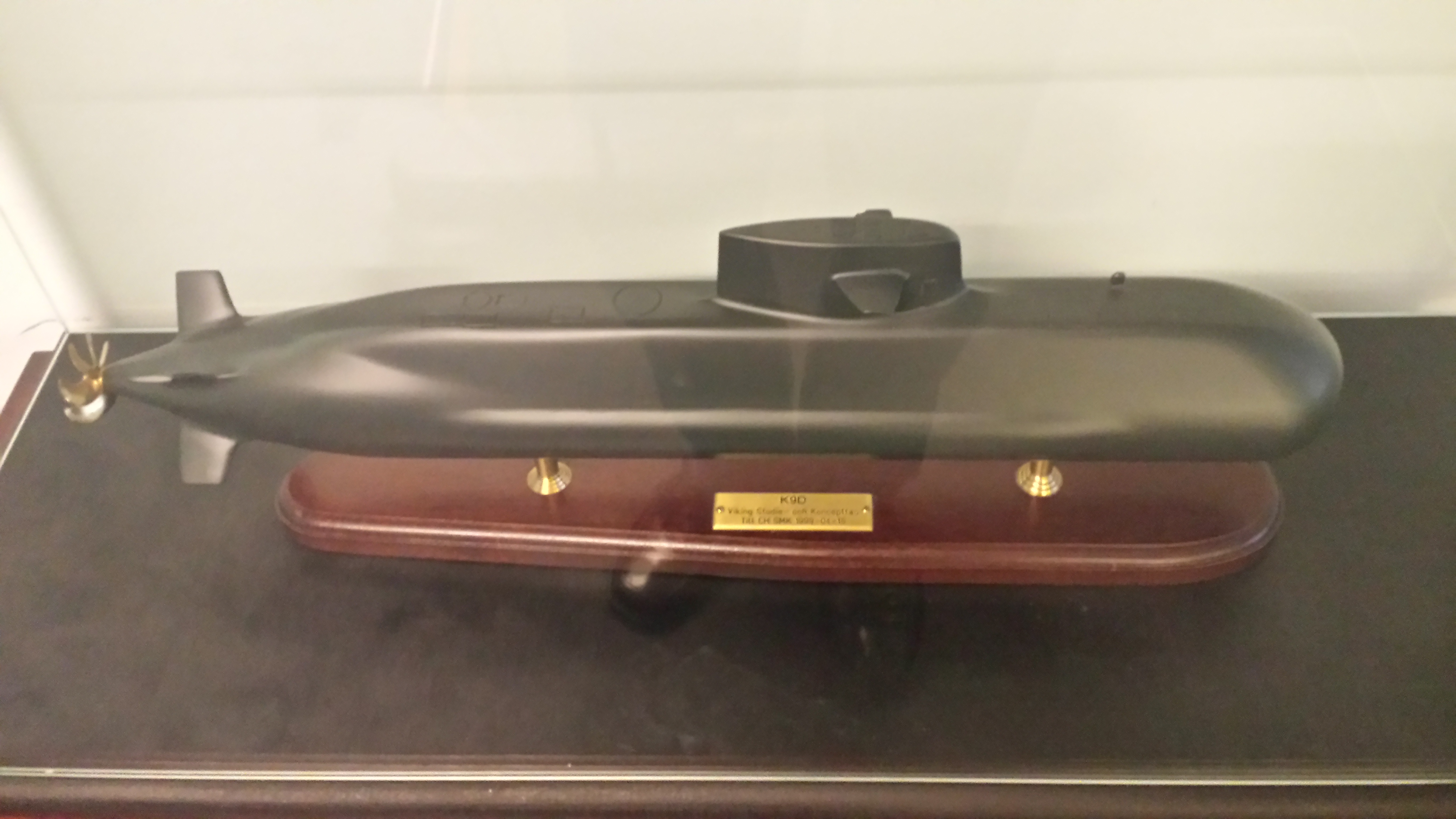
- A model of a K9D Viking-class submarine

Class overview
- Name: Viking class
- Builders: Viking Submarine Corporation
- Operators: Royal Danish Navy; Royal Norwegian Navy; Swedish Navy; Finnish Navy
- Succeeded by: A26 submarine
- Planned: 10
- Canceled: 10

General characteristics
- Type: Submarine
- Displacement: 1,100–1,700 t (1,083–1,673 long tons)
- Length: 52–60 m (170 ft 7 in – 196 ft 10 in)
- Beam: 6.7 m (22 ft 0 in)
- Propulsion: Stirling Air-independent propulsion (AIP)
- Speed: 11 knots (20 km/h; 13 mph) surfaced; 23 knots (43 km/h; 26 mph) submerged
- Endurance: Can stay submerged up to 100% of mission time
- Complement: 22–28
- Sensors & processing systems: DMUX20 / TSM2233 Mk3
- Armament: Multi-purpose homing torpedoes; Cruise missiles; ASW torpedoes; Mines and countermeasures

The Viking-class submarine was a planned class of submarines to be built by the Viking Submarine Corporation. Viking was a corporation jointly established by Kockums in Sweden, Kongsberg Defence & Aerospace in Norway and Odense Steel Shipyard in Denmark. Finland was an observer of the Viking project, as an eventual future buyer of additional Viking submarines. The idea was to develop modern successor to the Swedish Gotland class, that would have cost about one third of the German Type 214. It was initially planned that the Swedish, Danish, and Norwegian navies would purchase two, four, and four Viking-class submarines each starting in 2005.

When the Royal Danish Navy announced that they would stop using submarines completely in the summer of 2004, the whole Viking project was cancelled. Currently Kockums is doing low-intensive continuous research, based on the Viking design, towards the A26 submarine for Sweden.

In 2015 Damen Group and Saab Group announced that they have teamed up to jointly develop, offer and build next-generation submarines that are able to replace the current Walrus-class submarines of the Royal Netherlands Navy. It is speculated that the design will be derived from the A26 submarine.
