= Invincible-class submarine =

2022 class of Republic of Singapore Navy submarines

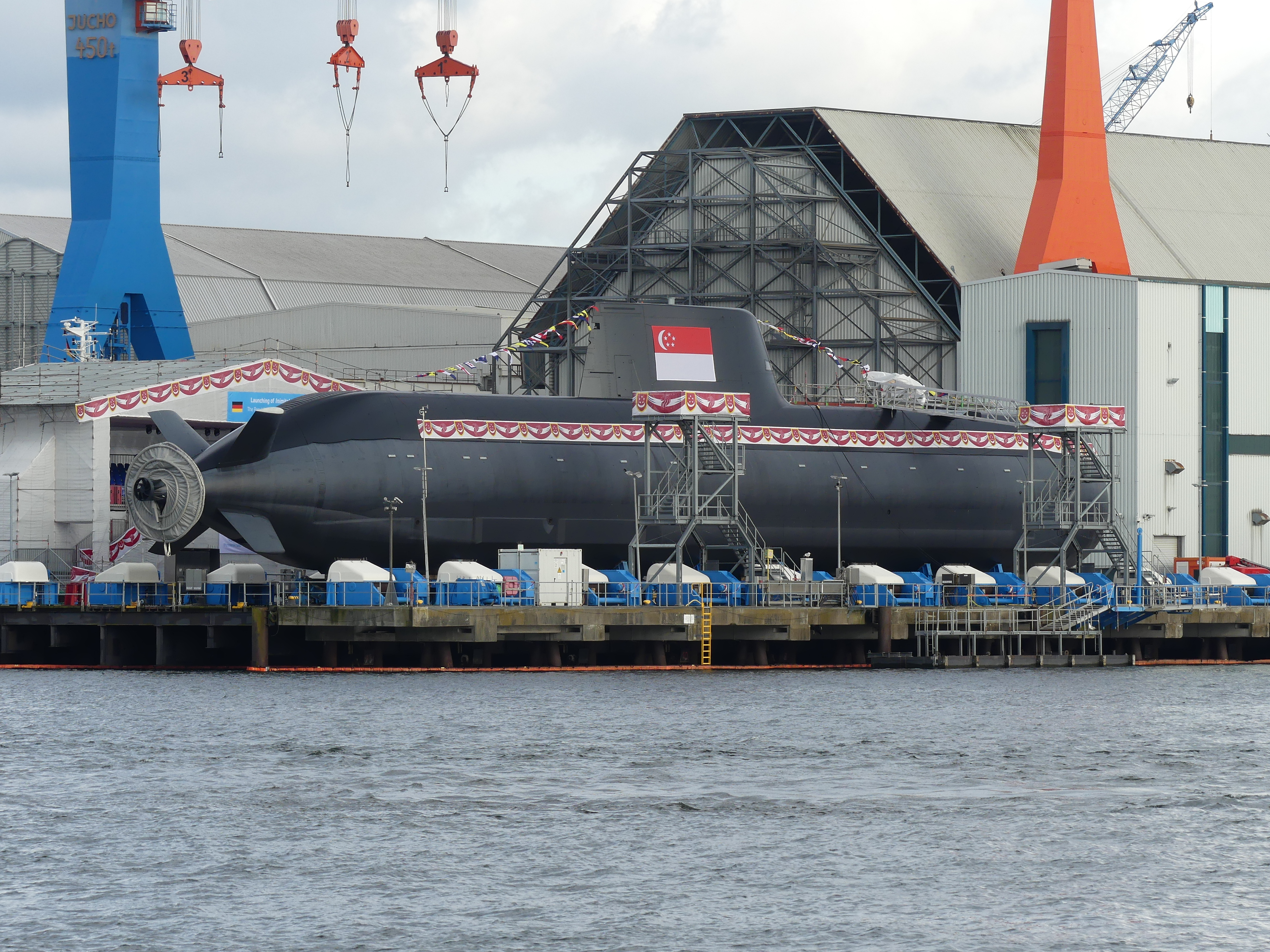
- Type 218SG submarine in Kiel, Germany

Class overview
- Builders: ThyssenKrupp Marine Systems (TKMS) - Howaldtswerke-Deutsche Werft
- Operators: Republic of Singapore Navy
- Preceded by: Archer class
- Built: 2014–present
- Planned: 6
- Building: 4
- Completed: 2

General characteristics
- Class & type: Invincible-class submarine
- Displacement: 2,200 tonnes (2,200 long tons) submerged; 2,000 tonnes (2,000 long tons) tonnes surfaced
- Length: 70 m (229 ft 8 in)
- Beam: 6.3 m (20 ft 8 in)
- Installed power: 2 × 120 kW PEM fuel cells
- Propulsion: Air-independent propulsion
- Speed: 15 knots (28 km/h; 17 mph) (Submerged); 10 knots (19 km/h; 12 mph) (Surfaced)
- Sensors & processing systems: Atlas Elektronik-ST Electronics developed "Combat Management System" (CMS); DSTA-developed data-analytics/decision support engines
- Armament: 8 × 533 mm (21.0 in) torpedo tubes; Heavyweight torpedoes; Anti-ship missiles; Naval mines
- Notes: Customised variant of the Type 214 submarine, with specific design inferences from the Type 212 submarine.

The Invincible-class submarines, formally classified as the Type 218SG submarines, are conventionally-powered diesel-electric attack submarines built for the Republic of Singapore Navy (RSN) by German-based naval conglomerate ThyssenKrupp Marine Systems (TKMS). Tailored to the operational requirements of the RSN, the model is derivative of the export-oriented Type 214 submarine, with specific design characteristics drawn from Type 212 submarines. They feature several additional capabilities, including a substantial level of automation, a significant payload capacity, enhanced underwater endurance and superlative ergonomics.

Singapore's Ministry of Defense (MINDEF) ordered a total of four Type 218SG submarines, of which two were ordered in 2013 and two more in 2017, as a replacement to the RSN's existing Challenger-class and Archer-class submarines. Built and launched between 2019 and 2024, the class currently comprises four submarines, namely, the Invincible, the Impeccable, the Illustrious and the Inimitable; of the four, the first is currently utilised for the training of the RSN's submariners, while the second and third are undergoing local sea trials aimed at achieving operationalisation. An order for two more submarines was placed in May 2025.

== Development and design ==
The design of the Type 218SG was jointly created by Defence Science and Technology Agency (DSTA), ThyssenKrupp Marine Systems (TKMS) and the Republic of Singapore Navy (RSN). The design of the submarines is highly customised—conceived to fulfill specific naval requirements of the RSN—including naval operations in littoral waters, guarding sea lines of communication (SLOC), intelligence-gathering (ISTAR) and special operations. The design is believed to be based on the Type 214 export-centric submarine, with design inferences from the Type 212 submarine, both of which were designed by TKMS. The design of the Type 218SG is also believed to have been influenced by the Type 216 submarine concept.

=== Selection ===
In November 2013, Singapore's Ministry of Defense (MINDEF) selected the Type 218SG design, offered by TKMS, as a replacement to the RSN's existing submarine fleet, siding an offer of three conventionally-powered submarines (presumably the Scorpène-class submarine) from French-based naval conglomerate Direction des Constructions Navales (now Naval Group). On 29 November 2013, MINDEF officially contracted TKMS to supply two Type 218SG submarines, along with a training and logistics package, at an estimated cost of US$1.36 billion. The order for the two submarines bore noteworthy significance for being the RSN's first-ever order for new custom-built submarines, since the service had previously relied on the acquisitions of the second-hand Challenger-class and the Archer-class submarines. The purchase of the two submarines was officially announced on 2 December 2013. According to the terms of the contract, the two submarines were initially scheduled to be delivered between 2020 and 2021.

On 16 May 2017, Singapore's minister of defence Ng Eng Hen announced that the RSN had placed an additional order for two more Type 218SG submarines, with additional arrangements of logistics and crew-training, bringing the total number of its ordered submarines to four. According to the terms of the contract, the two additional submarines are to be delivered between 2024 and 2025. In January 2023, it was reported that the cost of the purchase would be USD$1.8 billion.

=== Construction ===
The construction of the first submarine began in 2014, with a steel cutting ceremony at TKMS's shipyard in Kiel, Germany. The first submarine, christened as the Invincible, was launched in an elaborate ceremony on 18 February 2019, with defense minister Ng Eng Hen and representatives of the RSN in attendance. During the ceremony, Ng revealed the names of the other three submarines, namely, Impeccable, Illustrious and Inimitable. Invincible began its initial sea trials in September 2020, with its planned delivery date scheduled for 2020. However, in June 2020, Ng announced that the delivery of Invincible had been postponed to 2022, owing to restrictions caused by the COVID-19 pandemic.

The construction of the second ordered batch began in January 2018, commencing with the steel-cutting ceremony of the third submarine, Illustrious, which was attended by representatives from TKMS and the DSTA. In April 2021, German news outlet Lübecker Nachrichten reported that a Type 218SG submarine, presumably either the Invincible or the Impeccable, had suffered fire outbreak during its sea trials. Nevertheless, the submarine in question wasn't reported to have been seriously damaged, nor were the crew reported to have sustained injuries. One year later, during a visit by German Chancellor Olaf Scholz to Singapore in November 2022, Singaporean Prime Minister Lee Hsien Loong announced that the second and third submarines of the class, namely, the Impeccable and the Illustrious, would be launched in December of that year. The two boats were launched in an elaborate launching ceremony at TKMS's Kiel shipyard on 13 December, which was attended by Lee, Scholz and Singaporean Minister of Foreign Affairs Vivian Balakrishnan.

In May 2023, Impeccable, which had completed its sea trials earlier that year, was loaded onto a heavy-lift transport ship, the Rolldock Storm, for the transit trip to Singapore. Departing Kiel on 1 June, the Rolldock Storm undertook a one-month voyage, arriving in Singapore on 7 July, where it was unloaded the day after. Later that month, MINDEF announced that Impeccable would undergo a new set of local sea trials and workup aimed at achieving operationalisation prior to its commissioning later in the year. The final boat, the Inimitable, was launched by Singapore's Senior Minister and Coordinating Minister for National Security Teo Chee Hean in April 2024.

=== Additional orders ===
In December 2021, Der Spiegel reported that the German government, headed by outgoing Chancellor Angela Merkel, had sanctioned a series of last-minute arms deals, including the export of an additional Type 218SG to Singapore. The authenticity of the report was never verified by the RSN or TKMS, with neither confirming nor denying the existence of a fifth Invincible-class submarine at the time.

In March 2025, Defence Minister Ng Eng Hen announced a plan for the SAF to purchase two additional Invincible-Class submarines, bringing the total number to six. MINDEF announced the signing of the contract to purchase two additional submarines from Thyssenkrupp Marine Systems on 8 May 2025. The steel cutting ceremony took place in Germany on 29 September 2026.

== Characteristics ==
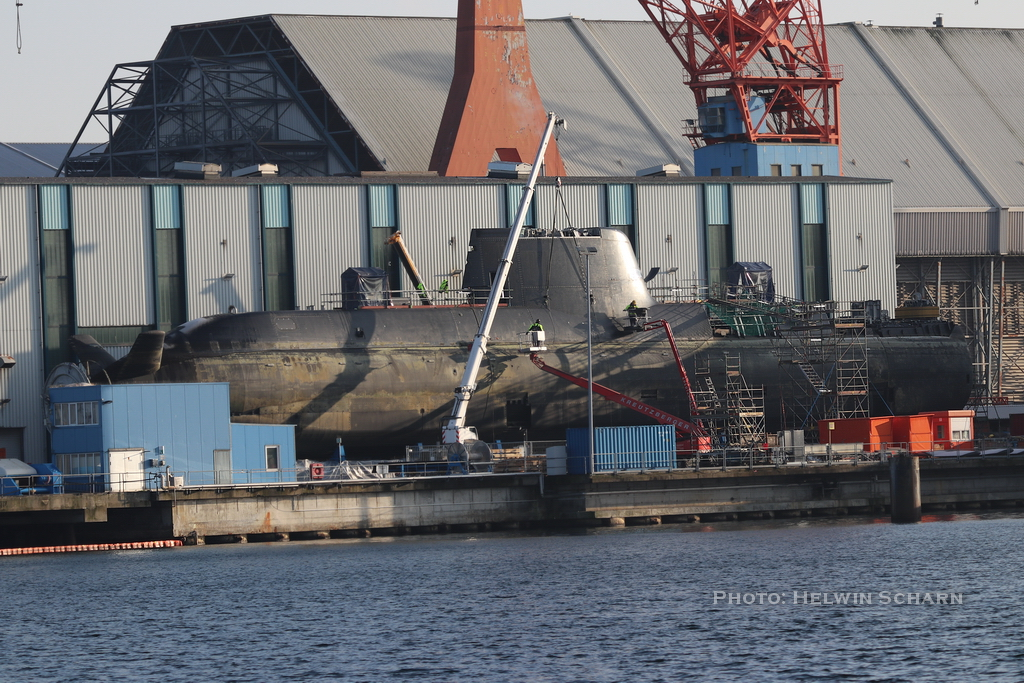
RSS Invincible, the first Type 218SG submarine, photographed while under construction at Kiel. Note the hull's resemblance to the Type 214 submarine, along with its distinctive "X-shaped" rudder configuration.

The Type 218SG has a length of 70 metres (229 ft 8 in) and a beam of 6.3 metres (20 ft 8 in), with an overall displacement of about 2,000 tonnes when surfaced and 2,200 tonnes while submerged. It has an estimated speed of about 10 knots (19 km/h; 12 mph) while surfaced and 15 knots (28 km/h; 17 mph) while submerged. The Type 218SG features several unique characteristics, including the use of specific materials accustomed to Singapore's tropical climate and saline waters, and extensive ergonomical factors for crew comfort, such as air conditioning, enlarged living quarters, additional showering facilities, individual on-sharing bunk beds, personal media entertainment systems similar to those in commercial airlines, toilet cubicles, additional storage space and equipment unique to the physiques of the RSN's sailors. With individual bunks, crew do not need to share their beds with others (a practice referred to as "hot-bunking"), allowing privacy for female crew. Spare beds are available for additional personnel.

=== Propulsion ===
As opposed to the Type 214's cruciform rudder configuration, the Type 218SGs feature an X-shaped rudder configuration similar to that on the Type 212 submarines, Dolphin-class and the Dakar-class submarine of the Israeli Navy for better maneuverability in Singapore's busy but shallow littoral waters around the Straits of Malacca and the South China Sea. A fuel-cell powered air independent propulsion (AIP) module for charging lithium-ion batteries (LiB) allows the Type 2128SG to remain submerged for about 50% longer than the Archer-class submarines; several estimates put underwater endurance at about 28–42 days (4–6 weeks) without snorkelling.

=== Armament ===
Details about the Type 218SG's armament are scant and almost non-existent; however, it is reported to have a higher ordnance payload carrying capacity and essentially greater firepower than the RSN's previous Challenger-class and Archer-class submarines, owing to its much larger size. It is understood that the submarine features eight 533-millimetre (21.0 in) and two 650-millimetre (26 in) forward-firing torpedo tubes — a similar configuration to that found on Israel's Dolphin-II submarines — which may be used for firing heavyweight torpedoes, anti-ship missiles and for laying naval mines, as well as a dedicated Horizontal Multi-Purpose Airlock (HMPL) which can be utilised to launch torpedoes and submarine-launched cruise missiles (SLCM), or to disembark naval special forces teams or divers. The submarines also come with an option to integrate a Vertical Multi-Purpose Airlock (VMPL) for launching missiles, similar to a Vertical Launching System module. The Black Shark Advanced heavyweight torpedo produced by WASS is speculated to have been integrated on the Type 218SG, as the RSN had previously acquired a number of Black Shark torpedoes (for use on its two Archer-class submarines) and is reportedly upgrading them to the new Black Shark Advanced standard.

=== Sensors and systems ===
Not much about the Type 218SG's sensors and automation have been reported by Singapore; however, it is understood the submarines are equipped with a "Combat Management System" (CMS) jointly developed by Atlas Elektronik and ST Electronics, along with data analytics and decision support engines developed by the DSTA. The high levels of sophisticated automation and decision-making systems allows the submarines to operate on three 8-hour shifts instead of two 12-hour shifts, thus allowing the crew longer periods of rest during protracted underwater deployments. The high-level of automation also reduces the crew complement from the usual 35 to just 28 — a number similar to that on the RSN's other smaller submarines, but fewer than other contemporary conventional submarines — of which around 10 are on active duty at any time, with the others off-duty or resting.

== Potential operators ==
- Greece: In July 2025, a formal process to acquire additional four submarines was started as part of a 20 year modernisation plan estimated to cost $25 billion. Type 218, Type 209NG, Scorpène-class, conventional Barracuda-class submarine (France), and Blekinge-class submarine are being considered.

== Ships in class ==
Name	Builder	Launched	Commissioned	Status
RSS Invincible	Germany ThyssenKrupp Marine Systems (TKMS)	18 February 2019	24 September 2024	Active
RSS Impeccable	Germany ThyssenKrupp Marine Systems (TKMS)	13 December 2022	24 September 2024	Active
RSS Illustrious	Germany ThyssenKrupp Marine Systems (TKMS)	13 December 2022	2028 (Scheduled)	Launched
RSS Inimitable	Germany ThyssenKrupp Marine Systems (TKMS)	22 April 2024	2028 (Scheduled)	Launched
TBA	Germany ThyssenKrupp Marine Systems (TKMS)			Ordered in May 2025
TBA	Germany ThyssenKrupp Marine Systems (TKMS)			Ordered in May 2025

== See also ==
- List of submarine classes in service

Equivalent submarines of the same era

- Dolphin II class
- U212 NFS
- Lada class
- Blekinge class
- Hai Kun class
- Type 212CD

=== Other references to the Republic of Singapore Navy ===
- List of ships of the Republic of Singapore Navy
