= Bumhan Industries =

South Korean manufacturing company

Bumhan Industries Co., Ltd.
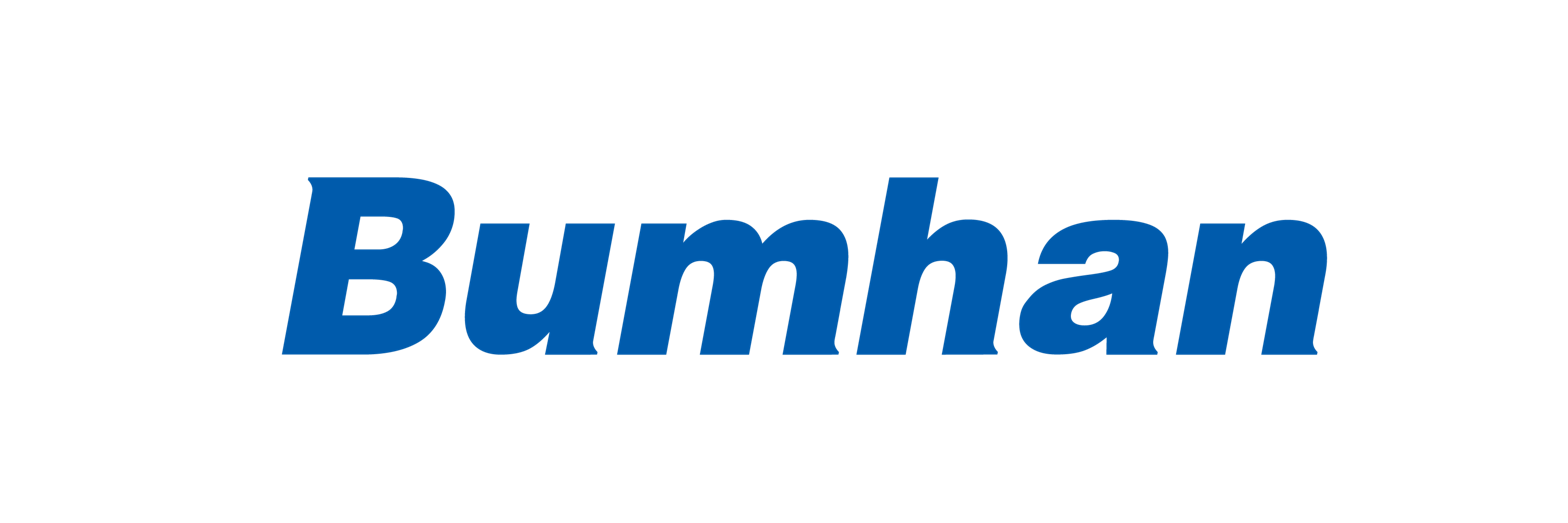
- Native name: 범한산업
- Traded as: KRX: 808294
- Industry: Shipbuilding
- Founded: 20 June 1990; 35 years ago
- Headquarters: Changwon, South Gyeongsang Province, South Korea
- Products: high-pressure compressors, fuel cells
- Website: bumhan.com

Bumhan Industries (Korean: 범한산업) is a South Korean company that produces shipbuilding equipment such as high-pressure compressors and fuel cells.

== Overview ==
In 2019, the hydrogen fuel cell division of Bumhan Industries was spun off to form Bumhan Fuel Cell (범한퓨얼셀). The company produces hydrogen charging stations, submarine fuel cells, and building fuel cells. In 2014, it became the second company in the world to successfully commercialize a submarine fuel cell module product. The fuel cells for batteries 1, 2, and 3 of batch-I, the early version of the Jang Bogo-class submarine-III of the Republic of Korea Navy, are manufactured by the company.
