= Amur-class submarine =

Proposed class of Russian submarines

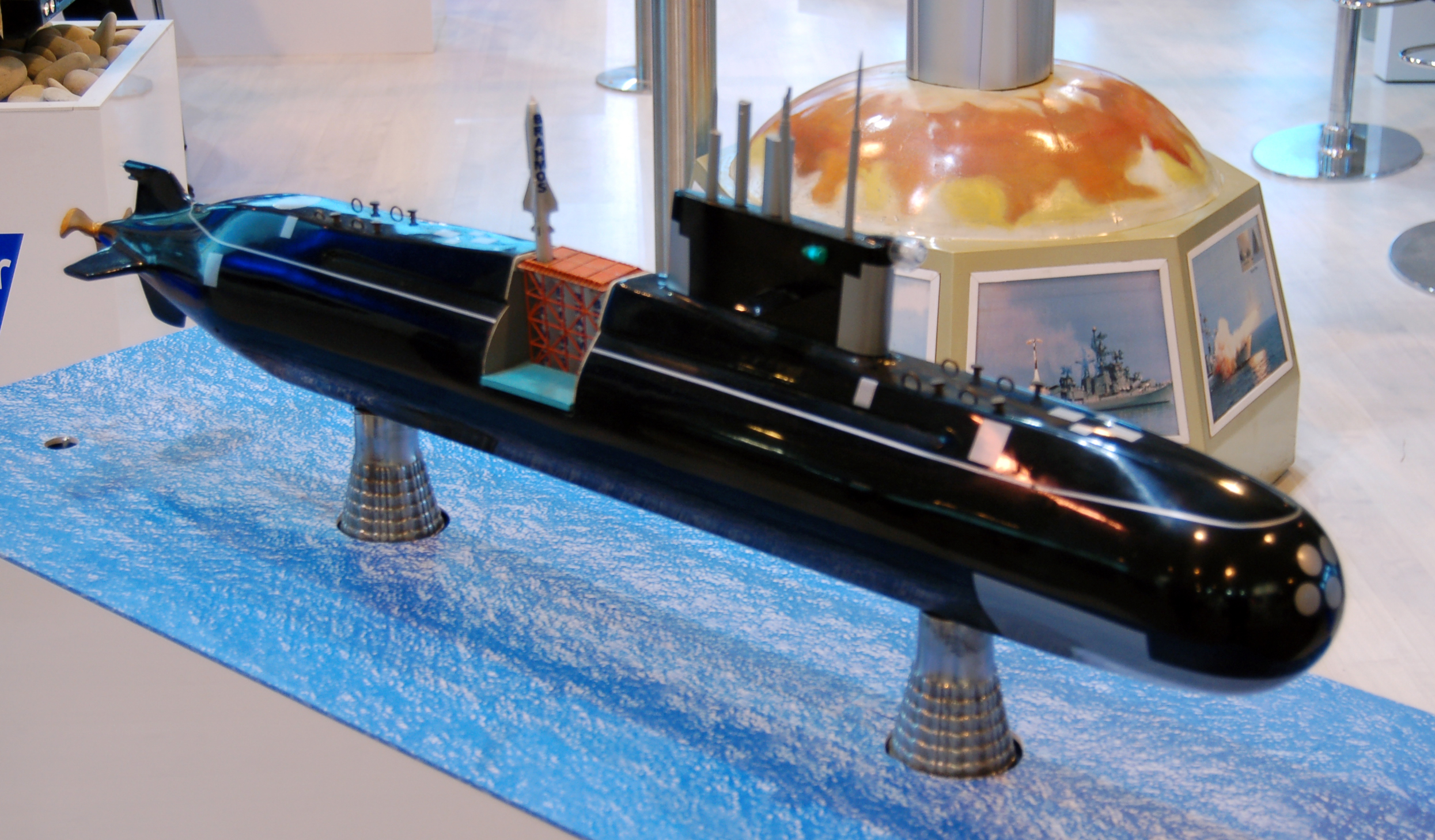
- Model of Amur-950 submarine with BrahMos

Class overview
- Name: Amur class
- Builders: Rubin Design Bureau, Admiralty Shipyard, Saint Petersburg.
- Operators: Russian Navy
- Preceded by: Lada class, Kilo class
- Cost: $450,000,000
- Planned: ~11
- Completed: 0

General characteristics (Amur-950)
- Type: Attack submarine
- Displacement: 950 long tons (970 t) surfaced
- Length: 56.8 m (186 ft 4 in)
- Beam: 5.65 m (18 ft 6 in)
- Height: 6.4 m (21 ft 0 in)
- Speed: 20 knots (37 km/h; 23 mph)
- Range: 350 nmi (650 km; 400 mi) AIP; 3,000 nmi (5,600 km; 3,500 mi) Snorkel
- Endurance: 45 days
- Test depth: 250 m (820 ft)
- Complement: 18
- Armament: 4 × 533 mm (21 in) torpedo tubes; 16 torpedoes; 10 VLS cells

The Amur-class submarine (named for the Amur River), is one of the latest Russian submarine designs. It is advertised as an export version of the Lada class, a modernized version of the Kilo-class submarine with improved acoustic stealth, new combat systems, and an option for air-independent propulsion (AIP).

The new vessels are the fourth generation of the Kilo submarine family, with two models developed.

As advertised, the Amur-1650 is larger and intended for longer missions. The Amur-950 is armed with a VLS missile system capable of salvo-fire at multiple predesignated targets. Sonar signatures of these submarines are several times lower than the older Kilo-class submarines. Both designs are equipped with electronic warfare armament of the newer generation created on the basis of the latest science and technology. They can be outfitted with AIP fuel cells, considerably improving submerged endurance and range. AIP capability can be added in a hull extension plug either during new build construction, or as a refit to existing boats.

The builder said these vessels can operate in all areas of the world except areas with solid ice cover, in all weather conditions, and in shallow and deep water.

== Construction ==
Rubin Central Design Bureau's chief designer for the Amur-1650 and -950 is Yuri Kormilitsyn. As the further development of ideas already implemented in Kilo-class submarines, Amur-class boats are single-hulled, with minimal displacement, allowing for reduced noise signature and improved propulsion quality. A totally new main electric engine using permanent magnets is in development/construction and projected to give high energy conversion efficiency even at low cruise speeds.

At the Army-2022 forum, another design - the Amur e600 - envisaged a submarine with all-electric propulsion and no sail. The design reportedly involved a submarine with lithium based battery technologies that might provide it with endurance of 17 days. It was not clear whether the design would proceed to construction.

On 13 February 2023, it was announced that Russia is offering India joint-development of the Amur 1650 submarine, as part of India's competition for the supply of six submarines announced in 2021. However, it was also reported in January that India may choose the Kalvari-class instead, due to concerns about the slow pace of the Amur-class project which will be ready no earlier than 2030.

== Planned versions ==
General characteristics
Model:	Amur 550	Amur 750	Amur 950	Amur 1450	Amur 1650	Amur 1850
Displacement (surf/subm. tons):	550/700	700/900	950/1300	1450/2100	1,650/?	1850/2600
Length (m):	46.0	48.0	56.8	58.0	66.8	68.0
Beam (m):	4.4	5.0	5.65	7.2	7.1	7.2
Speed submerged:	18 kn (33 km/h; 21 mph)	17 kn (31 km/h; 20 mph)	20 kn (37 km/h; 23 mph)	17 kn (31 km/h; 20 mph)	21 kn (39 km/h; 24 mph)	22 kn (41 km/h; 25 mph)
Range (AIP/snorkel):	250 / 1,500 nmi (460 / 2,780 km; 290 / 1,730 mi)	250 / 3,000 nmi (460 / 5,560 km; 290 / 3,450 mi)	350 / 4,000 nmi (650 / 7,410 km; 400 / 4,600 mi)	300 / 4,000 nmi (560 / 7,410 km; 350 / 4,600 mi)	500 / 6,000 nmi (930 / 11,110 km; 580 / 6,900 mi)	500 / 6,000 nmi (930 / 11,110 km; 580 / 6,900 mi)
Depth (m):	200	200	300	250	300	250
Endurance (days):	20	20	30	30	45	50
Complement:	18	21	19	34	35	37
Armament:	4 400 mm tubes, 8 torpedoes/mines	4 400 mm tubes, 8 torpedoes/mines	4 533 mm tubes, 16 torpedoes, missiles, mines total 10 vertical silos for BrahMos missiles	6 533 mm tubes, 18 torpedoes/mines/missiles	6 533 mm tubes, 18 torpedoes/mines/missiles	

== Operators ==
No boats of this class have been built yet. Russia has offered the sub for sale to India, but in 2005, India ordered Scorpène-class submarines instead. On 4 July 2013, Rosoboronexport announced they will offer the Amur 1650 to the Moroccan Navy if they announce a tender for new submarines. In 2021 there were negotiations between Russia and Argentina regarding the license production of Amur 1650 by Tandanor as part of a bigger arms deal.

== See also ==
- List of Soviet and Russian submarine classes
- Future of the Russian Navy
- Cruise missile submarine
- Attack submarine
