= Lada-class submarine =

Russian diesel electric patrol submarines

- Lada–class profile

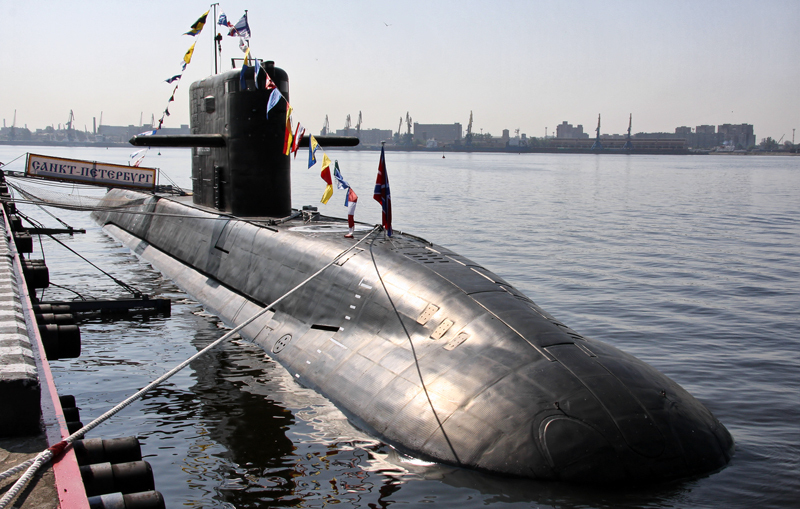
- B-585 Sankt Peterburg

Class overview
- Name: Lada class
- Builders: Admiralty Shipyard, Saint Petersburg
- Operators: Russian Navy
- Preceded by: Kilo class
- Succeeded by: Project Kalina; Amur class
- Built: 1997–present
- In service: 2010–present
- Planned: c. 9
- Building: 3
- Completed: 3
- Active: 2
- Retired: 1

General characteristics
- Type: Attack submarine
- Displacement: 2,700 long tons (2,743 t) submerged; 1,765 long tons (1,793 t) surfaced
- Length: 72 m (236 ft 3 in); 67 m (219 ft 10 in) on waterline
- Beam: 7.1 m (23 ft 4 in)
- Draught: 6.5 m (21 ft 4 in)
- Installed power: 2,700 hp (2,013 kW)
- Propulsion: Electric propulsion motor on permanent magnets; Storage battery with increased service life; 1 shaft
- Speed: 21 knots (39 km/h; 24 mph) submerged; 10 kn (19 km/h; 12 mph) surfaced
- Range: 7,500nm at 3 knots (13,800 km) submerged
- Endurance: 45 days
- Test depth: 300 m (984 ft)
- Complement: 35 officers and men
- Sensors & processing systems: Litiy CICS
- Armament: 6 × 533 mm (21 in) torpedo tubes; 16 torpedoes or SSMs or 44 mines; 10 Kalibr / Club land-attack cruise missiles, anti-ship missiles and anti-submarine missiles (some versions); RPK-6/SS-N-16 Vodopad/Stallion

Lada class, Russian designation Project 677 Lada (Russian: Лада, meaning "Lada", NATO reporting name St. Petersburg) is the class of diesel-electric attack submarine designed by the Russian Rubin Design Bureau. A program to develop a "fourth generation" diesel-electric submarine aimed to produce an improved version of the Project 636 with better acoustic signature, new combat systems and possibly air-independent propulsion. However, in 2019, Alexander Buzakov, the head of the Admiralty Shipyard, indicated that there were no plans to equip the Lada class with an air-independent propulsion system. In July 2022, it was reported that efforts to produce an electrochemical generator capable of making hydrogen from a combination of diesel fuel and oxygen was resuming as the designers signed a new contract in 2019. This was scheduled to be completed by the mid-2020s. In 2023, the decision was taken to decommission and scrap the lead ship of the class, Sankt Peterburg due to the very high costs of modernizing the submarine.

== History ==
The lead boat of the class, named Sankt Peterburg, was originally laid down in December 1997 alongside a second boat meant for export (Project 677E, apparently for India) that never got past initial construction and was very similar to the Project 677 boat. The lead boat was launched in October 2004 and began sea trials in November 2005. The submarine was transferred to the Russian Navy in April 2010.

Another two vessels were under construction at the Admiralty Shipyard with plans to launch four to six submarines by 2015. In 2009, the Russian Navy had set out a requirement for a total of eight St. Petersburg-class submarines. Indonesia had indicated its interest in acquiring two St. Petersburg-class submarines, but the deal fell through before 2010 due to financing issues.

In November 2011, the Russian Navy decided that this class of submarines would not be accepted into service, as the lead boat had fallen far short of requirements during tests. The lead boat was retained as a test vessel to experiment with various systems. The construction of the remaining boats of the class was frozen.

On 27 July 2012, the Russian Navy commander-in-chief announced the resumption of the construction of the St. Petersburg-class submarines, having undergone extensive design changes. In 2013 and 2015, two further boats were re-laid and commissioning was expected in 2017 and 2018.

On 20 September 2018, the first serial submarine of the class, B-586 Kronshtadt, was launched at the Admiralty Shipyards in St. Petersburg.

In June 2017, the Russian Navy announced it planned to order two more Lada-class submarines, and the build contract was signed in June 2019, during the International Military-Technical Forum «ARMY-2019». One more sub was ordered in August 2020, during the International Military-Technical Forum «ARMY-2020», with some speculation that all six of the submarines currently on order, or alternatively up to six of the eventual total number of Lada-class boats, might eventually be deployed with the Baltic Fleet.

In July 2025, Russian president Putin stated that at least nine submarines of the class would be built.

== Design ==
The project 677 St. Petersburg is a Russian diesel-electric submarine developed in the late 1990s. The submarine is designed for anti-submarine and anti-surface warfare, defense of naval bases, seashore and sea lanes, as well as for conducting reconnaissance. The class marks the first usage of a mono-hull design by the Russian navy for an attack submarine since the 1940s.

Displacement is 25% lower than that of its predecessor, the Kilo-class submarine, but its capabilities are greatly enhanced. Top submerged speed is 21 knots (39 km/h; 24 mph), up from 19 knots (35 km/h; 22 mph)s for the Kilo class. The class is designed for an endurance of 45 days with a complement of 35.

The submarine is equipped with automated combat control system Litiy (meaning "Lithium").

A variant designated as the project 1650 Amur-class submarine is offered as an export model.

== Units ==
#	Name	Builders	Laid down	Launched	Commissioned	Decommissioned	Fleet	Status	Notes
B-585	Sankt Peterburg	Admiralty Shipyards	26 December 1997	28 October 2004	8 May 2010	5 February 2024	Northern (Note: A report in 2020 suggested that deployment might shift to the Baltic Fleet.)	Decommissioned, to be scrapped	Prototype. Subsequent boats are heavily redesigned.
B-586	Kronshtadt	Admiralty Shipyards	28 July 2005	20 September 2018	31 January 2024		Northern	Active	Construction stopped due to multiple issues with B-585 Sankt Peterburg, resumed on 9 July 2013.
B-587	Velikiye Luki	Admiralty Shipyards	19 March 2015	23 December 2022	16 December 2025		Baltic	Active	Laid down on 10 November 2006, re-laid in 2015 due to a redesign.
	Vologda	Admiralty Shipyards	12 June 2022				Northern	Under construction	
	Yaroslavl	Admiralty Shipyards	12 June 2022				Northern	Under construction	
	Maloyaroslavets	Admiralty Shipyards	27 August 2026				Northern	Under construction	

== See also ==
- Future of the Russian Navy
- List of submarine classes in service

=== Equivalent submarines of the same era ===
- U212 NFS
- Type 218SG
- Blekinge class
- Hai Kun class
- Dolphin II class

== Bibliography ==
- Polmar, Norman (2026). Submarines of the Russian and Soviet Navies: 1946–2026. Schiffer Publishing. ISBN 978-0-7643-7083-0.
