= TKMS =

German naval vessel company

TKMS AG & Co. KGaA
- Type: Public
- Traded as: FWB: TKMS; MDAX component
- Industry: Shipbuilding
- Founded: January 5, 2005; 21 years ago
- Headquarters: Kiel, Germany
- Area served: Worldwide
- Key people: Oliver Burkhard (chairman and CEO); Volkmar Dinstuhl (supervisory board chairman)
- Owner: ThyssenKrupp (51%); Alfried Krupp von Bohlen und Halbach Foundation (10%)
- Number of employees: 9,100 (2025)
- Parent: ThyssenKrupp
- Subsidiaries: Howaldtswerke-Deutsche Werft; Atlas Elektronik
- Website: tkmsgroup.com

TKMS AG & Co. KGaA (ThyssenKrupp Marine Systems) is a group and holding company of providers of naval vessels, surface ships and submarines. It was founded when large industrial conglomerate ThyssenKrupp acquired Howaldtswerke-Deutsche Werft in January 2005.

== Composition ==
The group consists of:

- Howaldtswerke-Deutsche Werft in Kiel, Germany
- TKMS Wismar in Wismar, Germany
- Atlas Elektronik in Bremen, Germany
- Estaleiro Brasil Sul in Itajaí, Brazil

As of August 30, 2006, the group represented a sales volume of around €2.2 billion and had a workforce of 8,400 people.

On the 12th of April 2023, ThyssenKrupp sold its stake on Hellenic Shipyards to George Prokopiou.

== History ==
The corporation opened a branch office in Karachi, Pakistan on 25 July 2007. By January 2009, it had become one of the biggest private shipbuilding companies in Pakistan.

In 2017 the Israeli government and TKMS signed a deal for three Dakar-class submarines. Allegations of corruption surrounding the deal have led to the formation of an Israeli governmental committee of inquiry and subsequent prosecution for corruption.

In 2021, TKMS received the biggest order in its history, worth €5.5 billion for six identical Type 212CD submarines (in partnership with Kongsberg Gruppen) for the German and Norwegian navies. In January 2021, ThyssenKrupp confirmed the acquisition of the Oceana shipyard in Itajaí, Brazil, becoming the company's first shipyard in Latin America, with the objective of building the new Brazilian Tamandaré-class frigates.

In 2023, TKMS signed a memorandum of understanding with India's Mazagon Dock Shipbuilders, with the value of the agreement expected to be about 7 billion euros.

Also in 2023, the German government signalled that it was prepared to back a sale of TKMS by taking a supporting minority stake. Since 2024, ThyssenKrupp has been running a dual-track process for TKMS, which could result in either a sale or spin-off of the division. In June 2024, private equity firm Carlyle and German development bank KfW entered into negotiations to jointly acquire a majority stake in TKMS. By October 2024, Carlyle abandoned the negotiations.

In 2024, TKMS and German peer NVL formed a joint venture to primarily build F127 frigates.

In July 2025, the German government reached a preliminary agreement with ThyssenKrupp on getting a right of approval if a stake of 25% or more were to be sold in TKMS following a spin-off; in addition, the government would have a pre-emptive right if ThyssenKrupp were to sell a stake of 5% or more to a third party.

In August 2025, TKMS lost out against Mitsubishi Heavy Industries on a landmark $6.5 billion deal to supply the Royal Australian Navy with new frigates. That same month, it became one of the two finalists, along with Hanwha Ocean, under consideration for a contract to deliver up to twelve submarines to the Royal Canadian Navy. In July 2026, it was selected as the preferred supplier for the Canadian contract. In July 2026, Canadian Prime Minister Mark Carney selected TKMS over South Korea's Hanwha Ocean for the country's multi-billion dollar submarine fleet construction contract.

In January 2026, TKMS submitted a non-binding bid for smaller competitor German Naval Yards (GNYK).

== Military ships and submarines sales and production ==
=== Ships ===
==== Confirmed sales ====
Design base	Class	Type of ships	Shipyard	Order / in production	Client	Notes
MEKO 200	Al-Aziz class	Multipurpose light frigate	Alexandria Shipyard, in Egypt (produced under licence)	1 (3 out of 4 delivered)	Egyptian Navy	The three first frigates of this class were constructed at the Stahlbau Nord Shipyard, in Bremerhaven (Germany), and the fitting out took place at the HDW shipyard in Kiel (Germany). The three ships were delivered. The fourth ship is made under licence in Egypt, and the fitting out is ongoing.
MEKO A-100	Tamandaré-class frigate	Multipurpose light frigate	TKMS Estaleiro Brasil Sul shipyard, in Itajaí (Brazil) (former Oceana Shipyard)	3 (1 out of 4 delivered)	Brazilian Navy	4 ordered in Mar 2020, production in a TKMS shipyard in Itajaí (Brazil).
Berlin-class replenishment ship	Protecteur-class auxiliary vessel	AOR vessel Auxiliary Oil Replenishment	Seaspan Shipyards, in Vancouver (Canada) (produced under licence)	1	Royal Canadian Navy	1 already delivered, a second in production. The ships are part of the JSS project.
Total				5		

==== Likely sales ====
Design base	Class	Type of ships	Shipyard	Likely sales	Client	Notes
MEKO A-400 AMD	F127-class frigate	Guided-missile frigate (air defence)	–	8	German Navy	Eight frigates are planned to be purchased by the German Navy.
MEKO 200	F128 - MEKO A-200 DEU-class frigate	Frigate ASW; Anti-submarine warfare	–	8	German Navy	Four frigates approved for order in July 2026 following the cancellation of the F126 Niedersachsen-class frigate. Four additional approved for order in October 2026.
MEKO A100	Tamandaré class	Multipurpose light frigate	TKMS Estaleiro Brasil Sul shipyard, in Itajaí (Brazil) (former Oceana Shipyard)	5	Brazilian Navy	Four additional planned to be purchased as of Apr 2026. A fifth in negotiation as of Nov 2026.
Total				21		

=== Submarines ===
==== Confirmed sales ====
Design base	Class	Type of ships	Shipyard	Order / in production	Client	Notes
–	Dakar-class submarine	Cruise-missile and attack submarine	TKMS shipyard in Kiel (Germany)	3	Israeli Navy	The submarines were ordered in Jan 2022, and the production started in Nov 2024. It is equipped with VLS, and is likely designed to launch nuclear cruise missiles.
Type 212	Type 212CD-class submarine	Attack submarine	TKMS shipyard in Kiel (Germany) TKMS Wismar shipyard in the future (former MV Werften shipyard)	6	German Navy	Common orders and contract from Norway and Germany. German orders: 2 ordered in Aug 2021.; 4 ordered in Dec 2024.; Norwegian orders: 4 ordered in Aug 2021.; 2 ordered in Dec 2025.
Type 212	Type 212CD-class submarine	Attack submarine	TKMS shipyard in Kiel (Germany) TKMS Wismar shipyard in the future (former MV Werften shipyard)	6	Royal Norwegian Navy	Common orders and contract from Norway and Germany. German orders: 2 ordered in Aug 2021.; 4 ordered in Dec 2024.; Norwegian orders: 4 ordered in Aug 2021.; 2 ordered in Dec 2025.
Type 214	Reis-class submarine	Attack submarine	Gölcük Naval Shipyard, in Gölcük (Turkey) (produced under licence, with packages supplied by TKMS / HDW)	4 (2 out of 6 delivered)	Turkish Navy	The contract for 6 submarines was signed in Jul 2009. The second submarine was handed over in Nov 2025.
Type 218	Invincible-class submarine	Attack submarine	TKMS shipyard in Kiel (Germany)	3 (3 out of 6 delivered)	Republic of Singapore Navy	Orders: 4 ordered in Nov 2013, three delivered, the fourth is ongoing sea trial.; 2 ordered in May 2025.
Total				22		

==== Likely sales ====
Class	Subclass	Type of ships	Shipyard	Likely sales	Client	Notes
Type 212	Type 212CD-class submarine	Attack submarine	TKMS shipyard in Kiel (Germany) TKMS Wismar shipyard in the future (former MV Werften shipyard)	12	Royal Canadian Navy	Announced as preferred supplier ahead of Hanwha Ocean, negotiations in progress; delivery expected from 2034.
Type 214	Project P-75I - phase 2	Attack submarine	MDSL shipyard in Mumbai (India) (to be produced under licence / tech transfer)	6	Indian Navy	Class selected in Jan 2025, as part of the Project P-75I, likely to be produced under licence in India.
–	–	Attack submarine	TKMS shipyard in Kiel (Germany)	1	Portuguese Navy	One additional submarine is planned to be purchased by Portugal (Lei de Programação Militar).
Total				19		

==== Planned replacements ====
Ongoing bids and potential sales in new submarine purchase programmes.

Class	Subclass	Type of ships	Potential sales	Client	Notes
Type 209	Type 209NG-class submarine	Attack submarine	3	Argentine Navy	In competition with Naval Group to supply submarines to Argentina.
Type 209	Type 209NG-class submarine	Attack submarine	4	Egyptian Navy	The Egyptian Navy is looking to replace its Romeo-class submarines, and the Type 209 is among the likely competitors.
Type 209	Type 209NG-class submarine	Attack submarine	4	Hellenic Navy	The Hellenic Navy is planning to procure 4 submarines, and one of the German models will be offered. They will replace the Glafkos-class submarine (Type 209/1100) and Poseidon-class submarine (Type 209/1200).
Type 212	Type 212CD-class submarine	Attack submarine	4	Hellenic Navy	The Hellenic Navy is planning to procure 4 submarines, and one of the German models will be offered. They will replace the Glafkos-class submarine (Type 209/1100) and Poseidon-class submarine (Type 209/1200).
Type 212	U212NFS-class submarine	Attack submarine	4	Hellenic Navy	The Hellenic Navy is planning to procure 4 submarines, and one of the German models will be offered. They will replace the Glafkos-class submarine (Type 209/1100) and Poseidon-class submarine (Type 209/1200).
Type 218	–	Attack submarine	4	Hellenic Navy	The Hellenic Navy is planning to procure 4 submarines, and one of the German models will be offered. They will replace the Glafkos-class submarine (Type 209/1100) and Poseidon-class submarine (Type 209/1200).
Type 212	Type 212CD-class submarine	Attack submarine	3	German Navy	According to the Zielbild Marine 2035+ plan, the German will operate from 6 to 9 Type 212CD-class submarine, therefore up to 3 additional vessels could be ordered.
Type 212	U212NFS class	Attack submarine	2	Philippine Navy	The U212NFS is made in partnership with Fincantieri.
–	–	Attack submarine	2	Royal Malaysian Navy	Two planned to be procured between 2031 and 2035, no supplier selected yet.
–	Dolphin II-class submarine	Attack submarine	3	Royal Moroccan Navy	In 2025, Morocco expressed an interest to purchase 3 submarines.
Type 209	Type 209-1400 class	Attack submarine	3	Royal Moroccan Navy	In 2025, Morocco expressed an interest to purchase 3 submarines.
Up to			33		
