= Patrol boat =

Small naval vessel

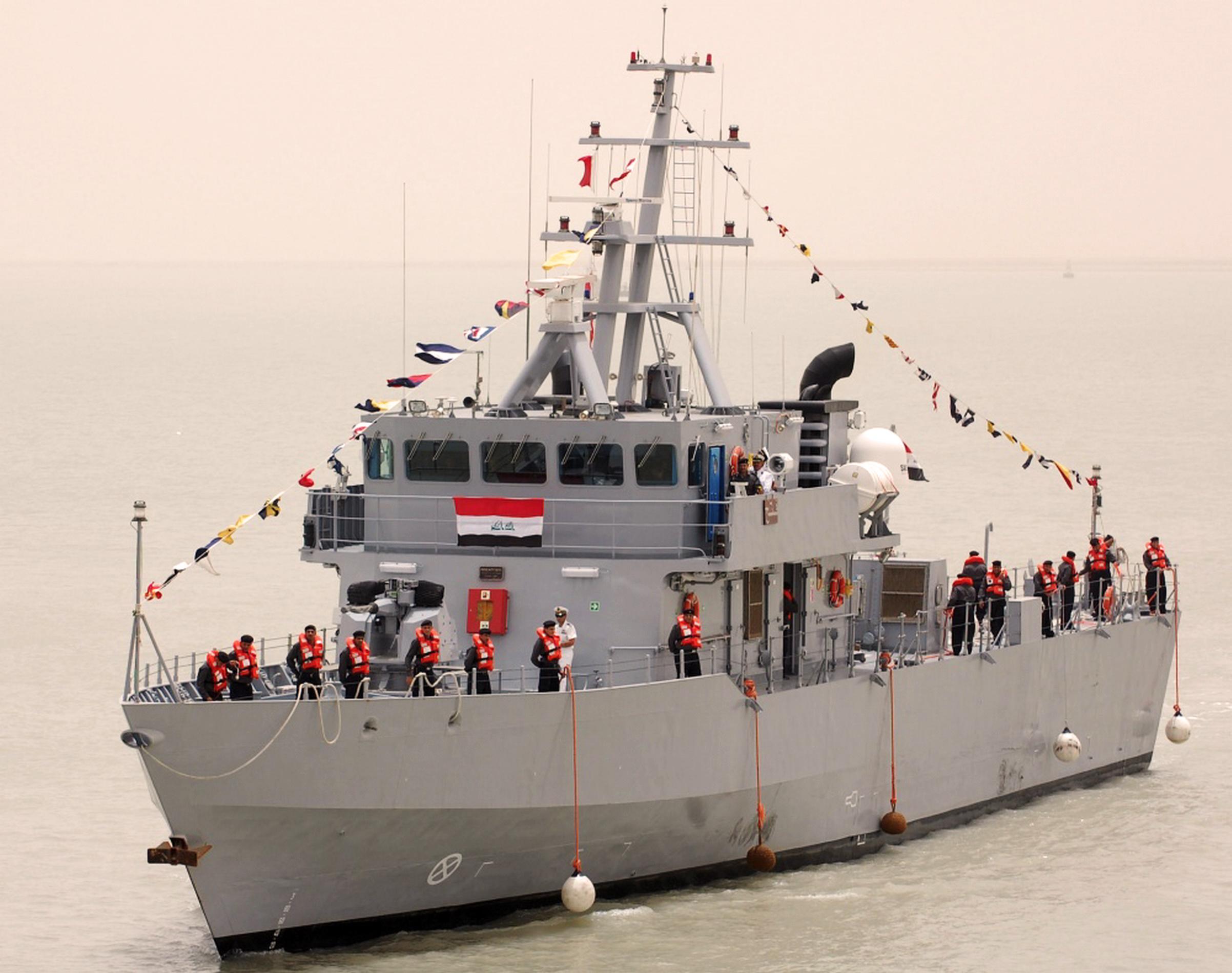
Fateh, a Diciotti-class offshore patrol vessel (OPV) in service with the Iraqi Navy

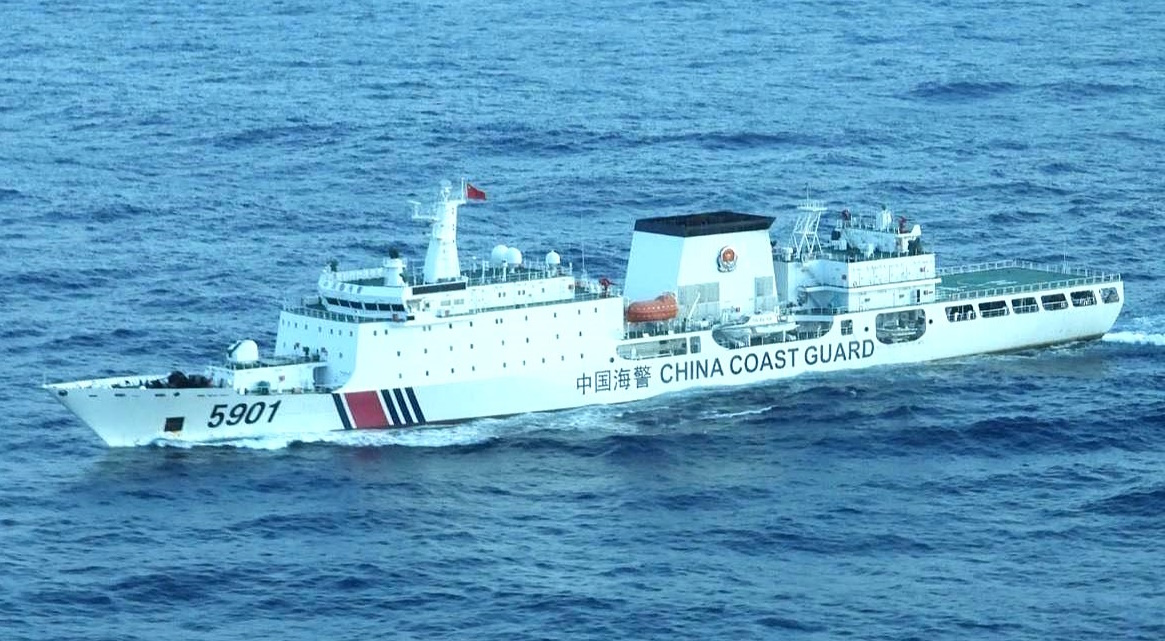
Zhaotou-class cutter, the largest patrol vessel class in the world, in service with the China Coast Guard

A patrol boat (also referred to as a patrol craft, patrol ship, or patrol vessel) is a relatively small naval vessel generally designed for coastal defence, border security, or law enforcement. However, large size patrol vessels are also operated by multiple navies and coastguards. There are many designs for patrol boats, and they generally range in size. They may be operated by a nation's navy, coast guard, police, or customs, and may be intended for marine ("blue water"), estuarine ("green water"), or riverine ("brown water") environments.

Per their name, patrol boats are primarily used to patrol a country's exclusive economic zone (EEZ), but they may also be used in other roles, such as anti-smuggling, anti-piracy, fishery patrols, immigration law enforcement, or search and rescue. Depending on the size, organization, and capabilities of a nation's armed forces, the importance of patrol boats may range from minor support vessels that are part of a coast guard, to flagships that make up a majority of a navy's fleet. Their small size and relatively low cost make them one of the most common naval vessels in the world.

Patrol boats are of varying types, including: offshore patrol vessels (OPV), patrol boat fast (PBF), patrol boat with surface-to-surface missile (PBG), patrol boat inshore (PBI), patrol boat with SAM (PBM), patrol boat riverine (PBR), patrol boat with torpedo (PBT).

== Classification ==
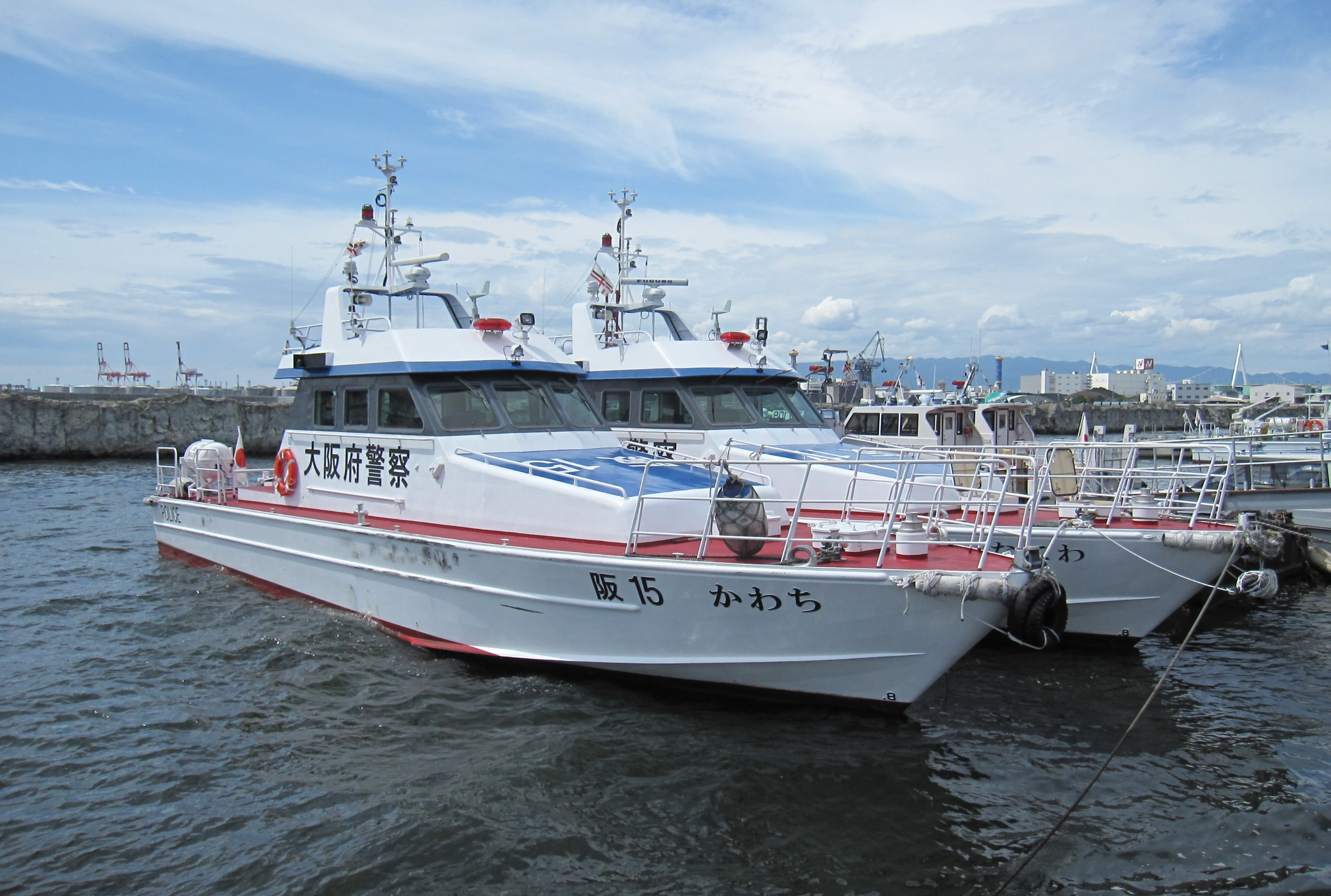
Kawachi, a patrol boat in service with the Osaka Prefectural Police

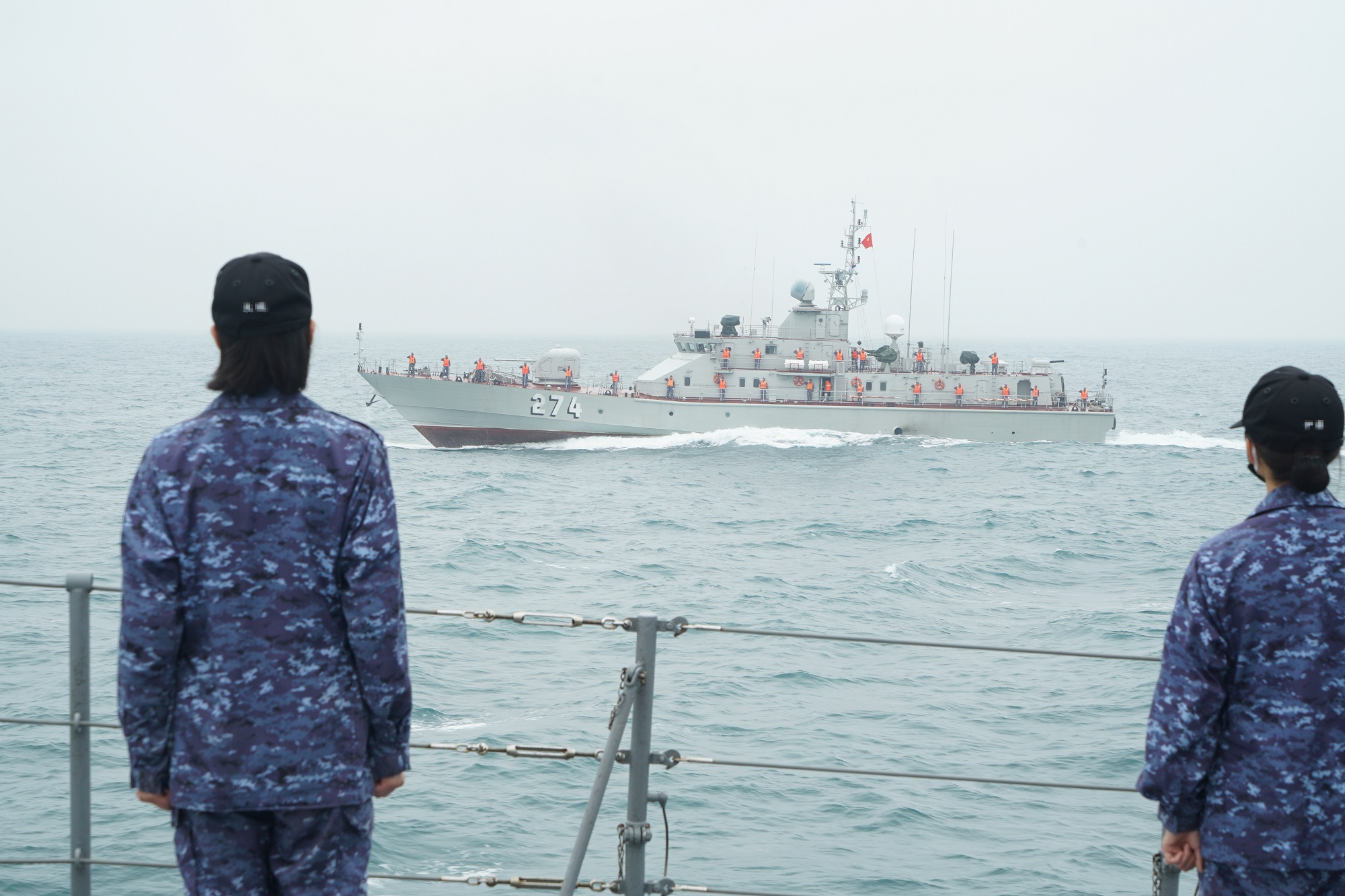
A Vietnam People's Navy TT-400TP midsize patrol boat. It is equipped with a 76mm naval gun, hence being designated as a gunboat in Vietnamese service.

The classification of a patrol boat is often subjective, but they are generally small naval vessels that are used to patrol national waters or a certain jurisdiction. They may be as large as a corvette or even a frigate, though the term may also be used for vessels as small as a yacht or rigid inflatable boat. They can include gunboat, fast attack craft, torpedo boats, and missile boats. They may be broadly classified as inshore patrol vessels (IPVs) or offshore patrol vessels (OPVs). OPVs and medium size cutters are usually the smallest ship in a navy's fleet that are large and seaworthy enough to patrol off-shore in the open ocean, while IPVs are typically too small to do so and are instead kept in lakes or rivers, or close to coasts; IPVs specifically used in rivers can also be called "riverine patrol vessels". Large patrol vessels, offshore patrol vessels and Large cutters are the largest type of patrol ships and are typically more than 100 m (330 ft) in length. Some OPVs may possess significant armament and may approach corvettes in terms of armed capability.

Seagoing patrol boats are typically around 30 m (100 ft) in length and usually carry a single medium caliber artillery gun as main armament, and a variety of lighter secondary armament such as machine guns, while others include the sophisticated close-in weapon system. Depending on their role, vessels in this class may also have more sophisticated sensors and fire control systems that would enable them to carry torpedoes, anti-ship missiles, and surface-to-air missiles.

== History ==
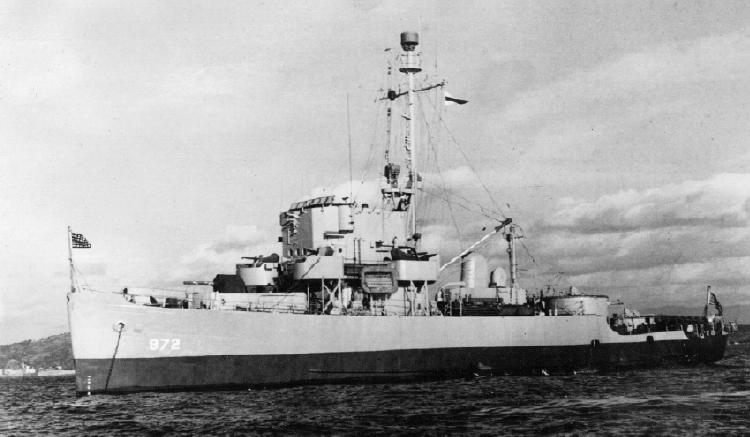
PCE-872, a World War II patrol craft escort of the U.S. Navy

During both World Wars, in order to rapidly build up numbers, all sides created auxiliary patrol boats by arming motorboats and seagoing fishing trawlers with machine guns and obsolete naval weapons. Some modern patrol vessels are still based on fishing and leisure boats.

The United States Navy operated the Pegasus class of armed hydrofoils for years in a patrol boat role. During the Vietnam War, the U.S. Navy ordered 193 aluminum hulled Patrol Craft, Fast (PCFs), also known as Swiftboats, for brown water naval operations. The Patrol Boat, River (PBR, sometimes called "Riverine" and "Pibber") was a fiberglass hulled vessel also designed and used for inland river operations during the Vietnam War, and became an icon of water operations during the war due to its use in the 1979 film Apocalypse Now.

Most modern designs are powered by gas turbine arrangements such as CODAG, and speeds are generally in the 25–30 knots (46–56 km/h; 29–35 mph) range. The largest OPVs might also have a flight deck and helicopter embarked. In times of crisis or war, these vessels are expected to support the larger vessels in a navy, though some smaller navies are mostly composed of just patrol boats.

== Specific nations ==
=== Albania ===
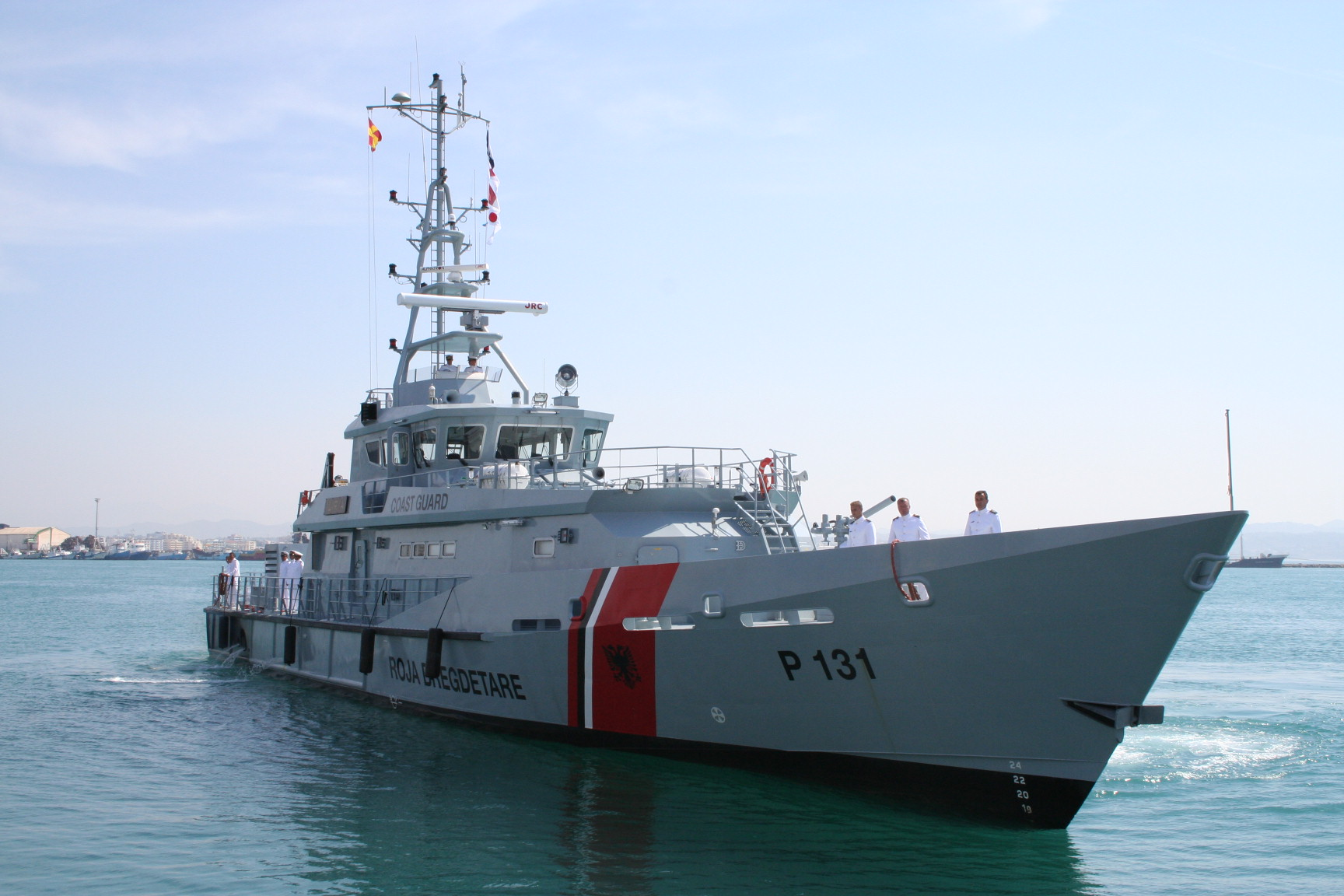
Iliria, an example of a modern patrol boat of the Albanian Naval Force

==== Albanian Naval Force ====
- Iliria-class patrol vessel

=== Algeria ===
==== Algerian National Navy ====
- Kebir-class
- Alusafe 2000
- Ocea FPB98 MKI

=== Argentina ===
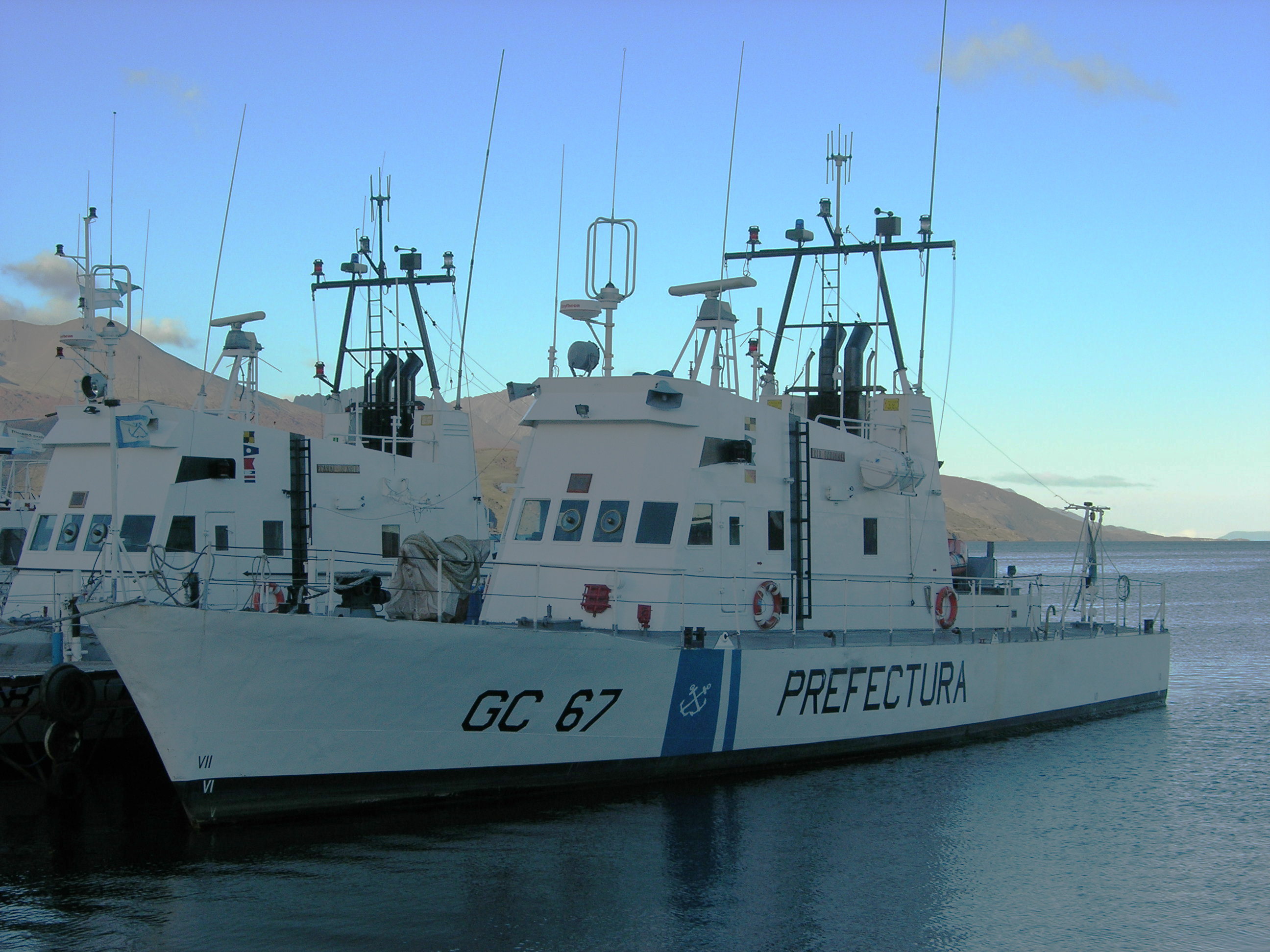
Argentine Naval Prefecture's GC67 patrol vessel

==== Argentine Naval Prefecture ====
- Mantilla-class patrol vessel
- Z-28-class patrol vessel
- Shaldag-class patrol boat

==== Argentine Navy ====
- Gowind-class vessel
- Murature-class vessel
- Intrépida-class boat
- Zurubí-class patrol boat
- Baradero class patrol boat
- Punta Mogotes class patrol boat

=== Australia ===
==== Royal Australian Navy ====
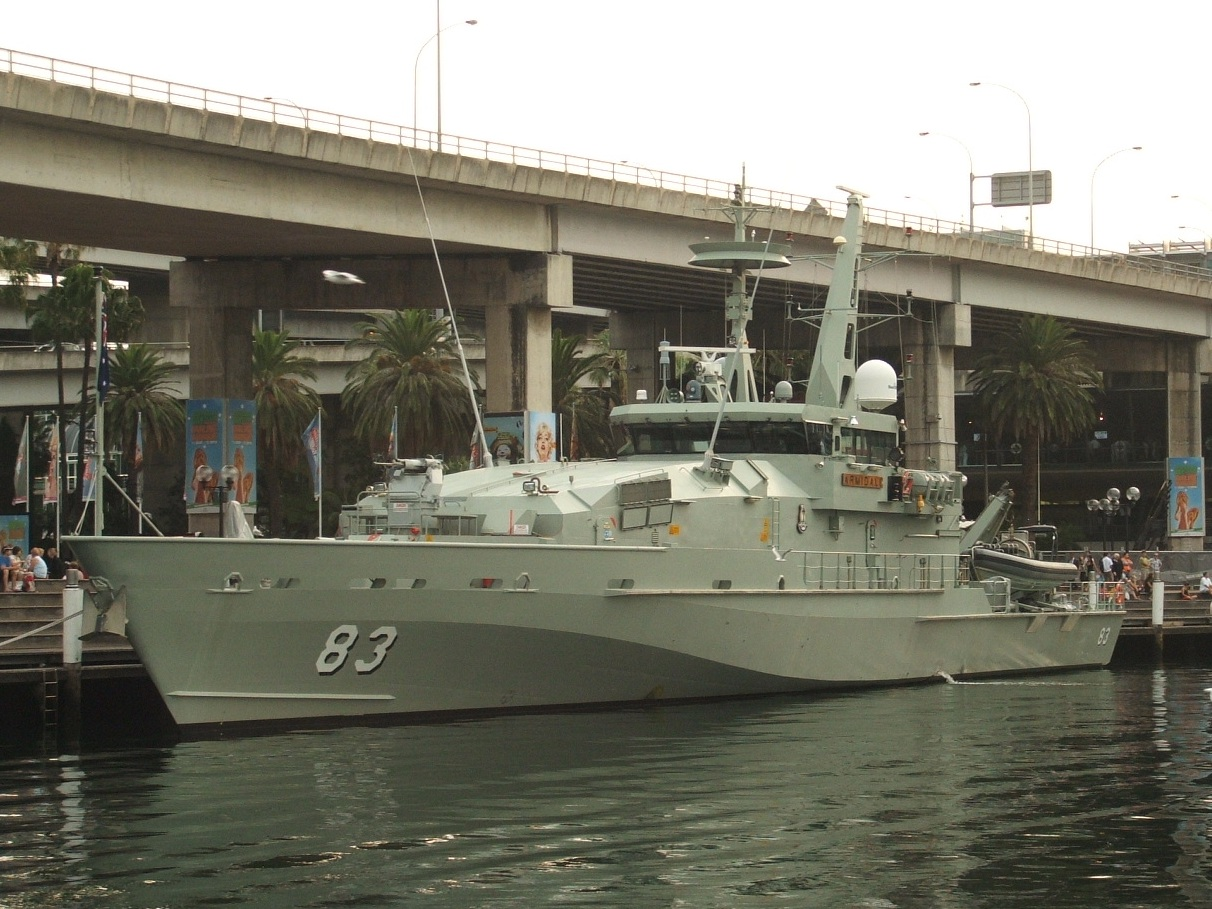
HMAS Armidale of the Royal Australian Navy

- Attack-class patrol boat (1967–1985)
- Fremantle-class patrol boat (1979–2007)
- Armidale-class patrol boat (2005–present)
- Cape-class patrol boat (2017–present)
- Arafura-class offshore patrol vessel (2025–present)

==== Australian Border Force Marine Unit ====
- Bay-class patrol boat (1999–present)
- ACV Triton (2006–2015)
- Cape-class patrol boat (2013–present) – replaced all but two of the Bay-class which underwent a life extension. Two Evolved Cape-class patrol boats ordered to replace the remaining two Bay-class patrol boats.

==== Others ====
- Pacific-class patrol boat (1987–2023) – Australian-built, gifted by the Australian Government to 12 Pacific Island countries (RMIS Lomor appears to be the last boat in service as of November 2022)
- Guardian-class patrol boat (2018–present) – Australian-built replacements for the Pacific class, gifted to the same 12 Pacific Island nations and Timor-Leste

=== Bahamas ===
==== Royal Bahamas Defence Force ====
- Bahamas-class patrol vessel
- Legend-class patrol vessel
- Floral-class patrol vessel

=== Bahrain ===
==== Royal Bahrain Naval Force ====
35m Fast Patrol Vessels- USA -built by Swiftships, Commissioned in 2021

=== Bangladesh ===
The Bangladesh Navy classified its medium size patrol ships as large patrol craft (LPC) which are armed with either anti-ship missiles or torpedoes. Those ships typically have heavier armaments but less range than OPVs.

==== Bangladesh Navy ====
Large patrol craft

- Durjoy class
- BNS Madhumati

Offshore patrol vessel

- Island class
- ARES 150

Inshore patrol vessel

- Padma class
- Meghna class

ASW patrol boat

- Kraljevica class
- Haizhui class
- Hainan class

Patrol gunboat

- Chamsuri class

==== Bangladesh Coast Guard ====
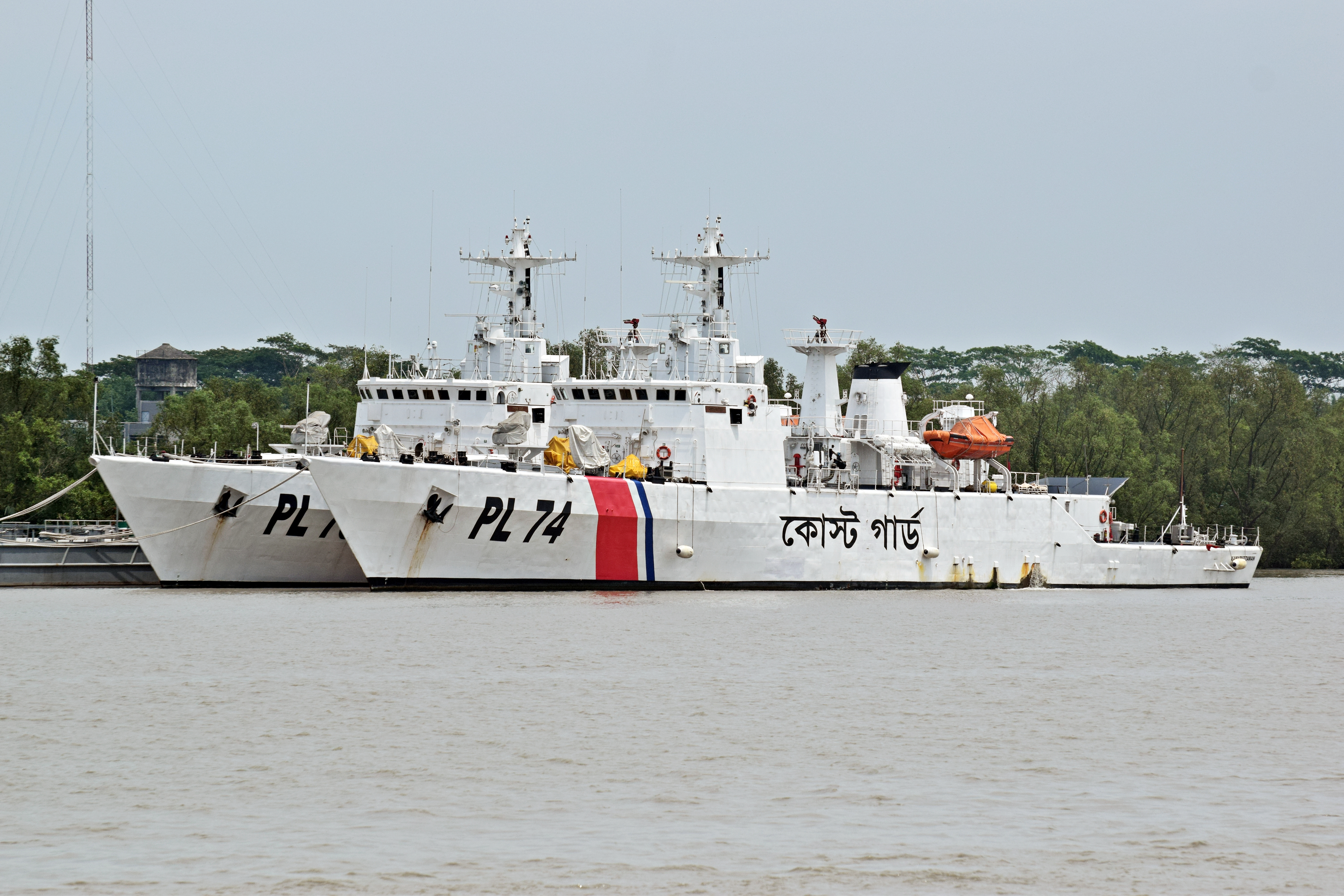
Leader-class OPVs of Bangladesh Coast Guard

Offshore patrol vessel

- Leader class

Inshore patrol vessel

- Padma class
- Sobuj Bangla class
- Ruposhi Bangla class
- Apurbo Bangla class

Fast patrol vessel

- Kutubdia class
- Porte Grande class

Coastal patrol vessel

- Tawfique class (former PLAN Shanghai II class)

Riverine patrol craft

- Pabna class

==== Border Guard Bangladesh ====
Patrol vessel

- Shah Jalal class

=== Barbados ===
==== Barbados Coast Guard ====
- HMBS Leonard C Banfield
- HMBS Rudyard Lewis
- HMBS Trident

=== Belgium ===
- Castor (in Dutch) (2014–present)
- Pollux (in Dutch) (2015–present)

=== Brazil ===
- Grajaú-class offshore patrol vessel
- Bracuí-class patrol vessel – ex-River-class minesweeper
- Imperial Marinheiro-class offshore patrol vessel
- Piratini-class patrol vessel
- Roraima-class river patrol vessel
- Pedro Teixeira-class river patrol vessel
- Macaé-class offshore patrol vessel
- Amazonas-class corvette

=== Brunei ===
- Darussalam-class offshore patrol vessel
- Ijtihad-class patrol vessel
- KH 27-class patrol boat
- FDB 512-class patrol boat
- Bendaharu-class patrol vessel
- Perwira-class patrol vessel
- Saleha-class patrol vessel
- Pahlawan-class patrol vessel

=== Bulgaria ===
- Obzor

=== Canada ===
==== Royal Canadian Navy ====
- Kingston-class coastal defence vessel (1996–present)
- Orca-class patrol vessel (2006–present)
- Harry DeWolf-class offshore patrol vessel (2016–present) – Icebreakers based on the Norwegian NoCGV Svalbard

==== Canadian Coast Guard ====
- Hero-class patrol vessel

=== Cape Verde ===
==== Cape Verdean Coast Guard ====
- Kondor-class
- Guardiao (P511)

=== Chile ===
==== Chilean Navy ====
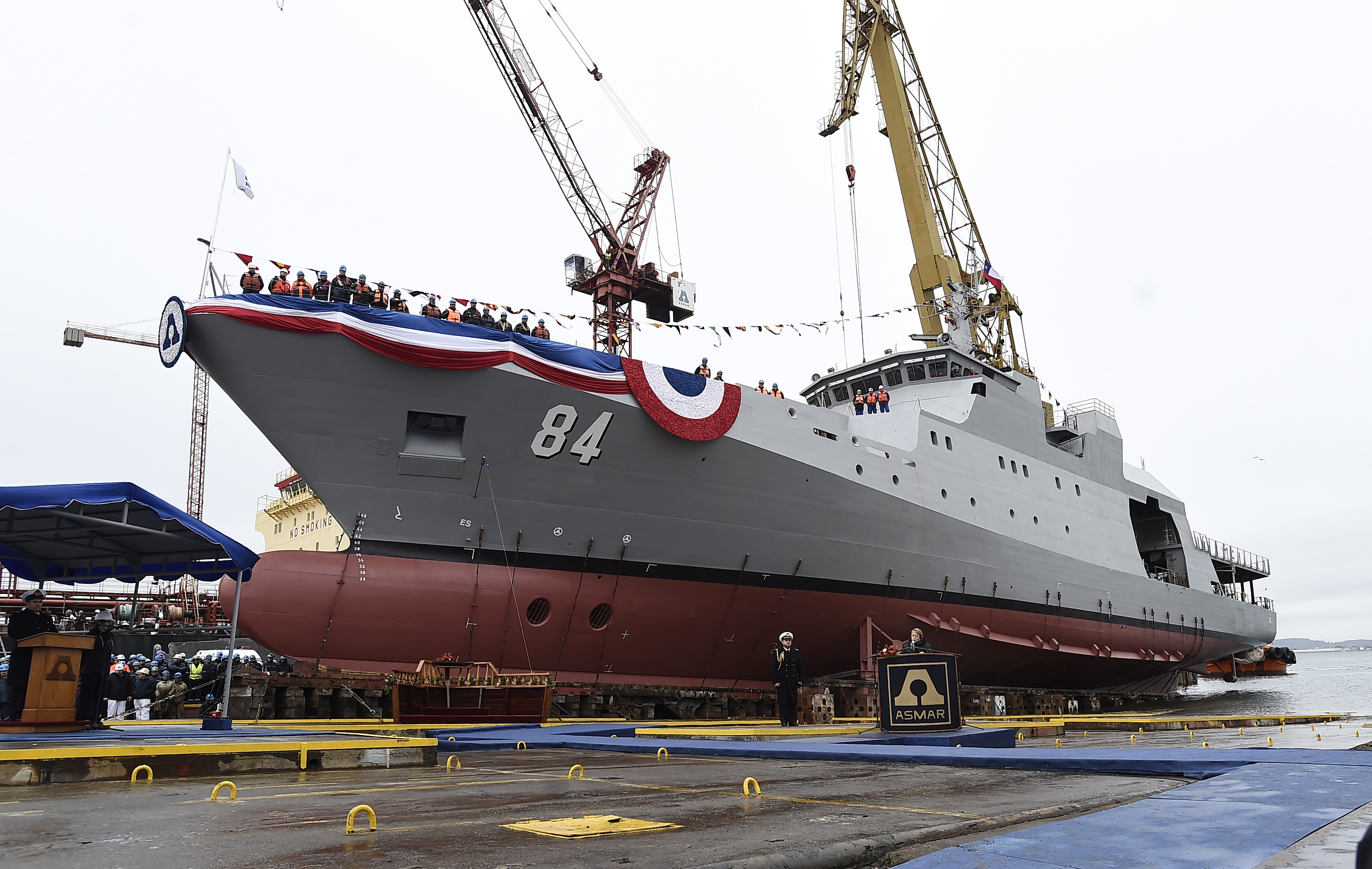
Cabo Odger (OPV-84), a OPV-80-class offshore patrol vessel of the Chilean Navy

- Pillán-class patrol craft (1979/1980–2001/2002)
- Maule-class patrol craft (1982–2014?)
- Dabur-class patrol boat (1990–present)
- Taitao-class large patrol craft (1993–present)
- Rodman 890-class patrol boat (1996–2017/2020)
- Protector-class patrol craft (1999–present)
- Defender-class boat (2007–present)
- OPV-80-class offshore patrol vessel (2007–present)
- Archangel-class boat (2008–present)

=== China (PRC) ===
==== People's Liberation Army Navy ====
- Harbour security boat (PBI) – four newly built 80-ton class harbour security / patrol boats, and more are planned in order to take over the port security / patrol duties currently performed by the obsolete Shantou, Beihai, Huangpu, and Yulin-class gunboats, which are increasingly being converted to inshore surveying boats and range support boats
- Shanghai III (Type 062I)-class gunboat – 2
- Shanghai II-class gunboat
- Shanghai I (Type 062)-class gunboat – 150+ active and at least 100 in reserve
- Huludao (Type 206)-class gunboat – 8+
- Shantou-class gunboat – less than 25 (in reserve, subordinated to naval militia)
- Beihai-class gunboat – less than 30 (in reserve, subordinated to naval militia)
- Huangpu-class gunboat – less than 15 (in reserve, subordinated to naval militia)
- Yulin-class gunboat – less than 40 (being transferred to logistic duties)

==== China Coast Guard ====
- Haixun-class cutter (Type 718)

=== Colombia ===
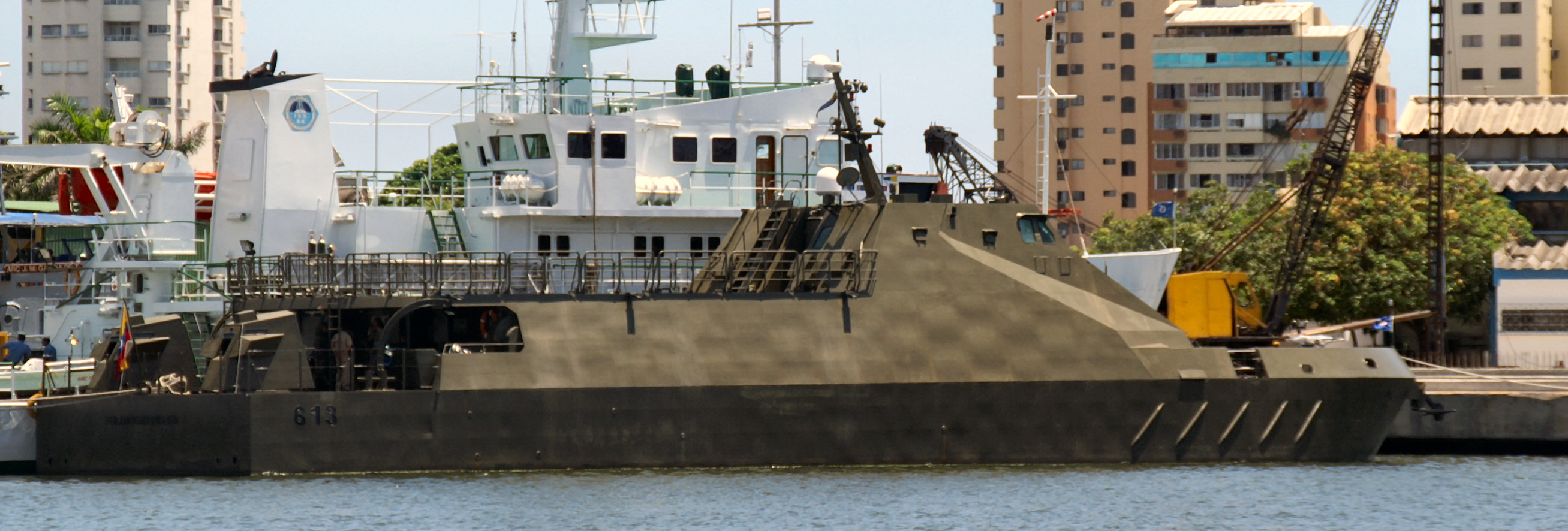
ARC Juan Ricardo Oyola Vera, a PAV-IV-class patrol boat of the Colombian National Navy

==== Colombian Navy ====
- Diligente-class patrol boat
- Nodriza-class patrol boat
- PAF-I-class patrol boat
- PAF-II-class patrol boat
- PAF-III-class patrol boat
- PAF-IV-class patrol boat
- Patrullera Fluvial Ligera-class patrol boat
- Riohacha-class gunboat
- Fassmer-80 class – built in Colombia by COTECMAR

=== Croatia ===
- Šolta (OB-02)
- Omiš (OB-31)

=== Denmark ===
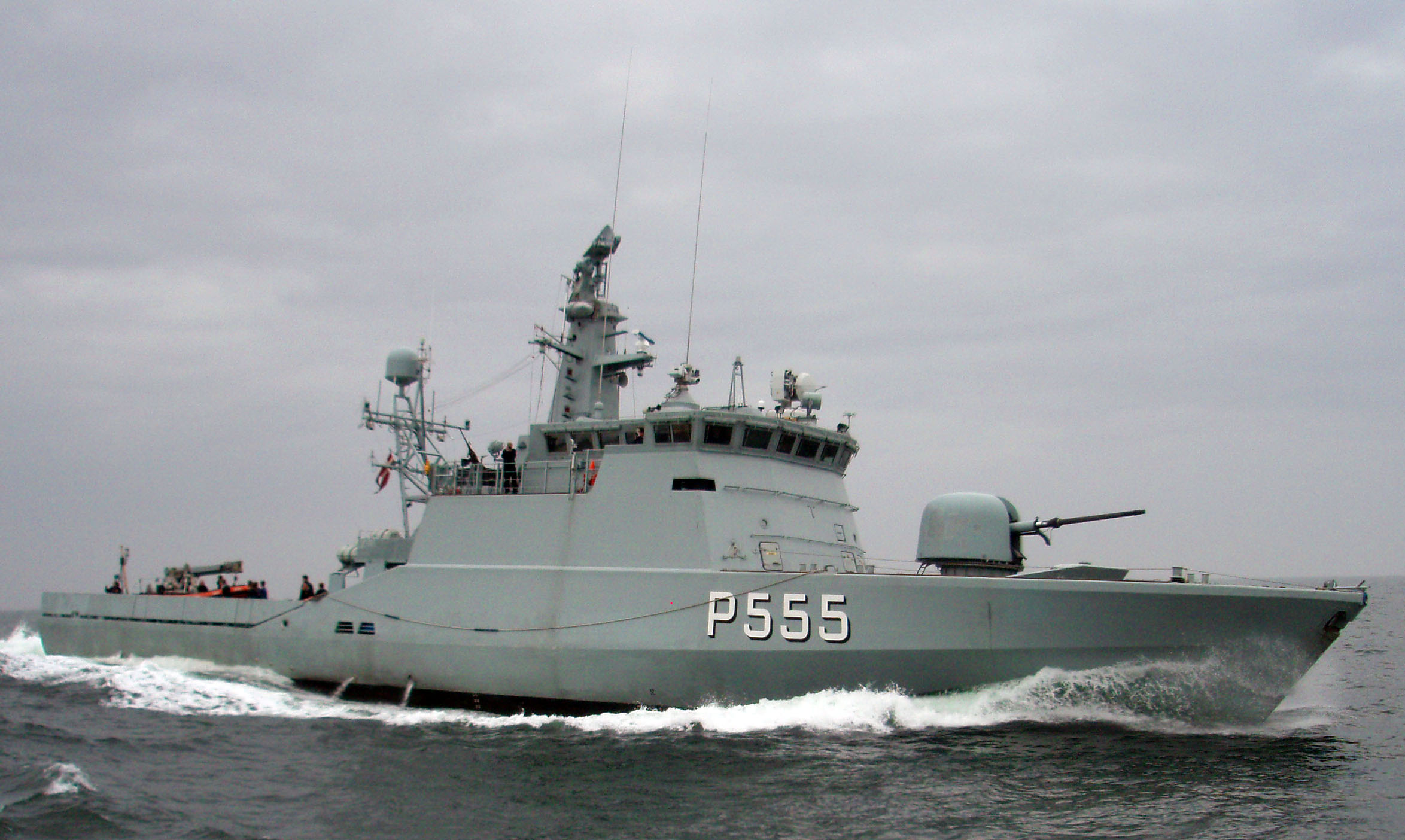
HDMS Støren (P555), a Flyvefisken-class patrol vessel with the Royal Danish Navy

==== Royal Danish Navy ====
- Knud Rasmussen-class OPV – 3 vessels
- Diana-class IPV – 6 vessels
- Flyvefisken-class patrol vessel
- Thetis-class OPV – 4 ships (classed as ocean patrol frigates)
- Agdlek-class IPV – 3 vessels
- Barsø-class IPV – 9 vessels (in Danish)
- Hvidbjørnen-class OPV (link in Danish) – 4 ships (classed as ocean patrol frigates)

=== Ecuador ===
==== Ecuadorian Navy ====
- Damen Stan Patrol 5009

=== Egypt ===
==== Egyptian Navy ====
- 35m Fast Patrol Vessels- USA -built by Swiftships

=== Eritrea ===
==== Eritrean Navy ====
- Eritrea-class 60m patrol vessel

==== Others ====
- Protector-class patrol boat

=== Finland ===
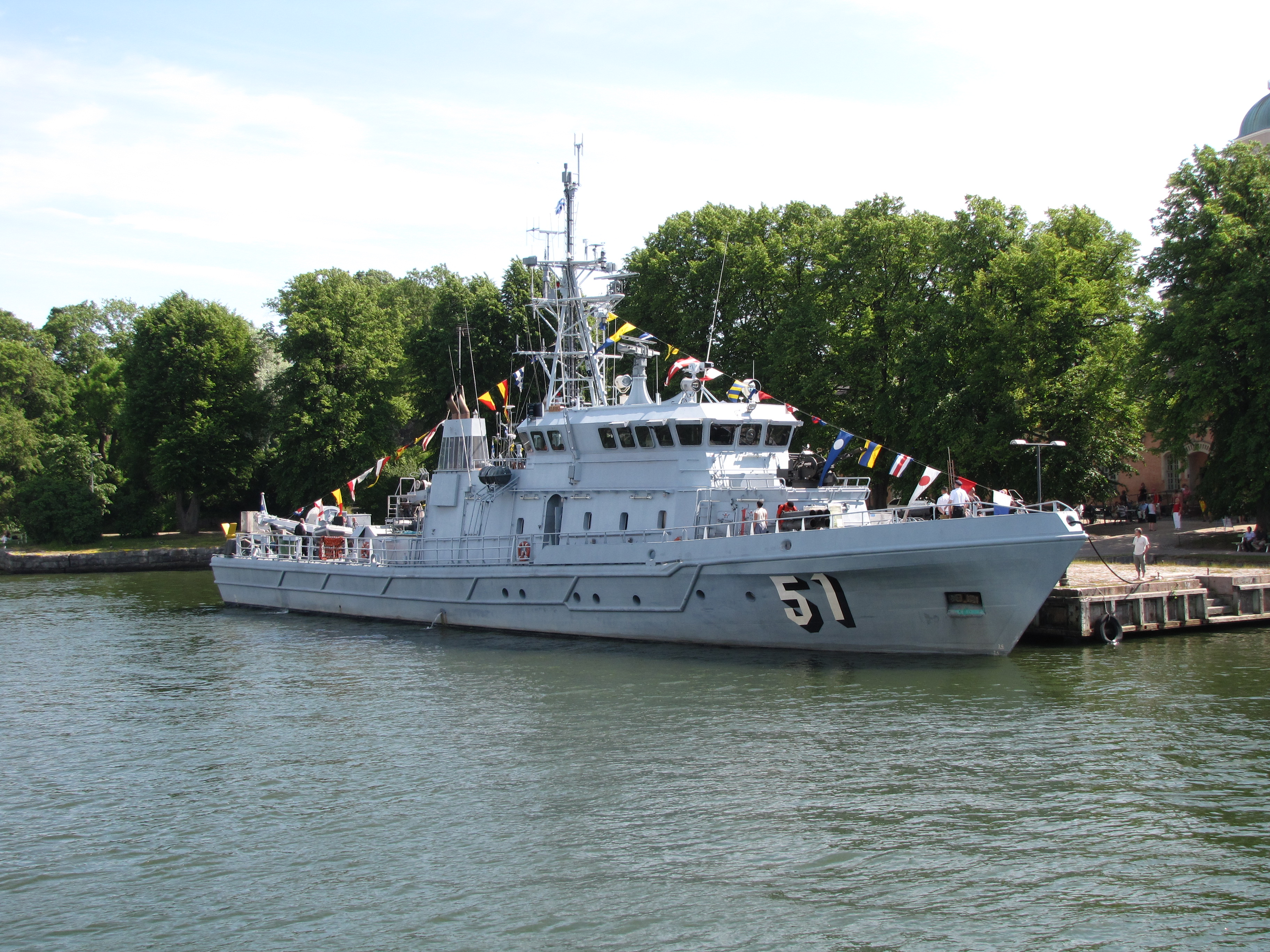
Kurki (51), a Kiisla-class patrol boat with the Finnish Navy

==== Finnish Navy ====
- Kiisla class – formerly Finnish Border Guard, now Finnish Navy
- VMV class

==== Finnish Border Guard ====
- VL Turva – an offshore patrol vessel built at STX Finland Rauma shipyard in 2014

=== France ===
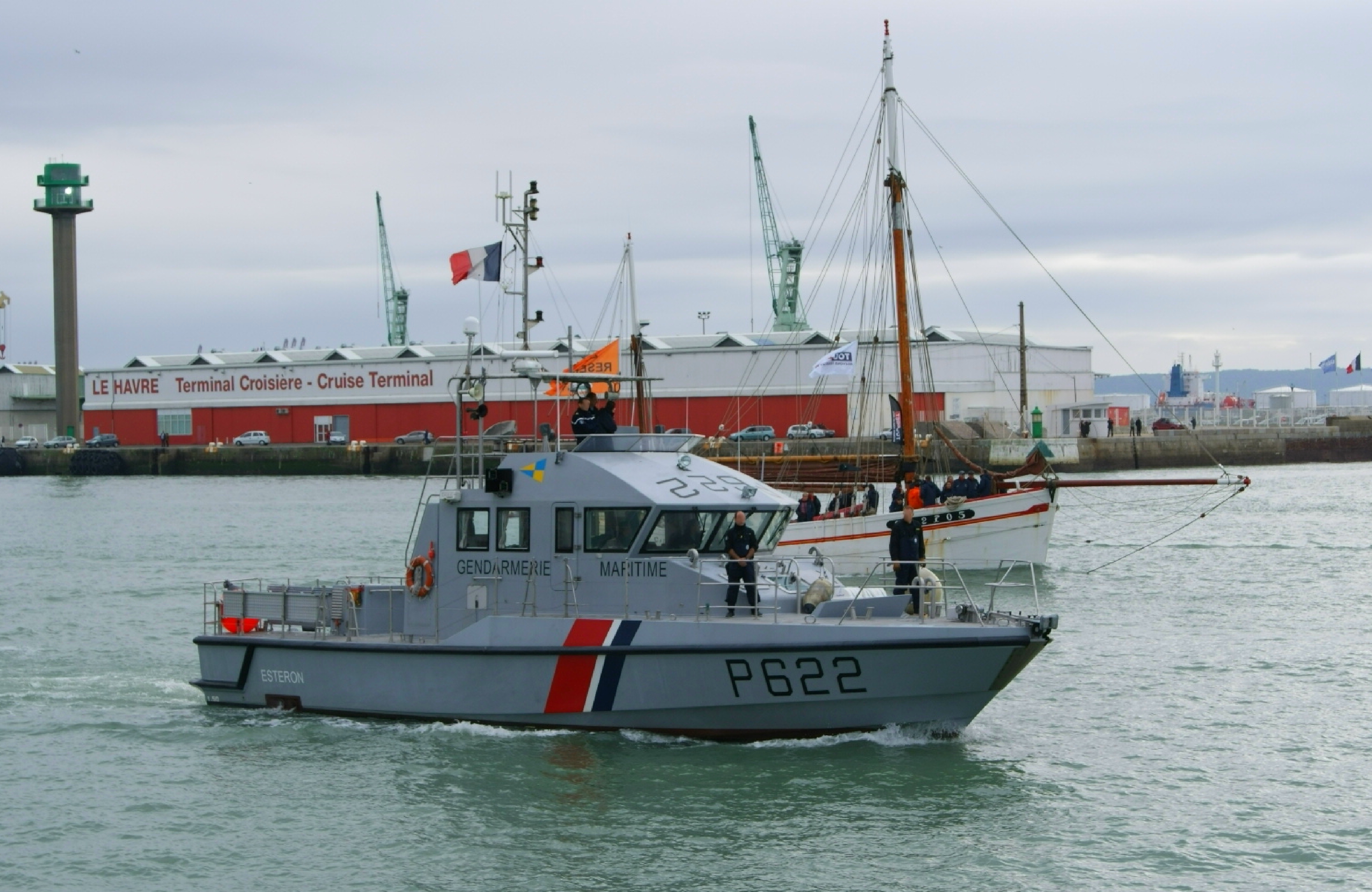
Maritime Gendarmerie Vedette class patrol boat

==== French Navy ====
- D'Estienne d'Orves-class
- Félix Eboué-class
- Confiance-class
- Flamant class
- P400-class
- Patrouilleurs Hauturiers (planned)

==== Maritime Gendarmerie ====
- Trident-class patrol boat
- Géranium-class patrol boat
- Jonquille-class patrol boat
- Vedette-class patrol boat
- Pétulante-class patrol craft
- Pavois-class patrol craft

=== Germany ===
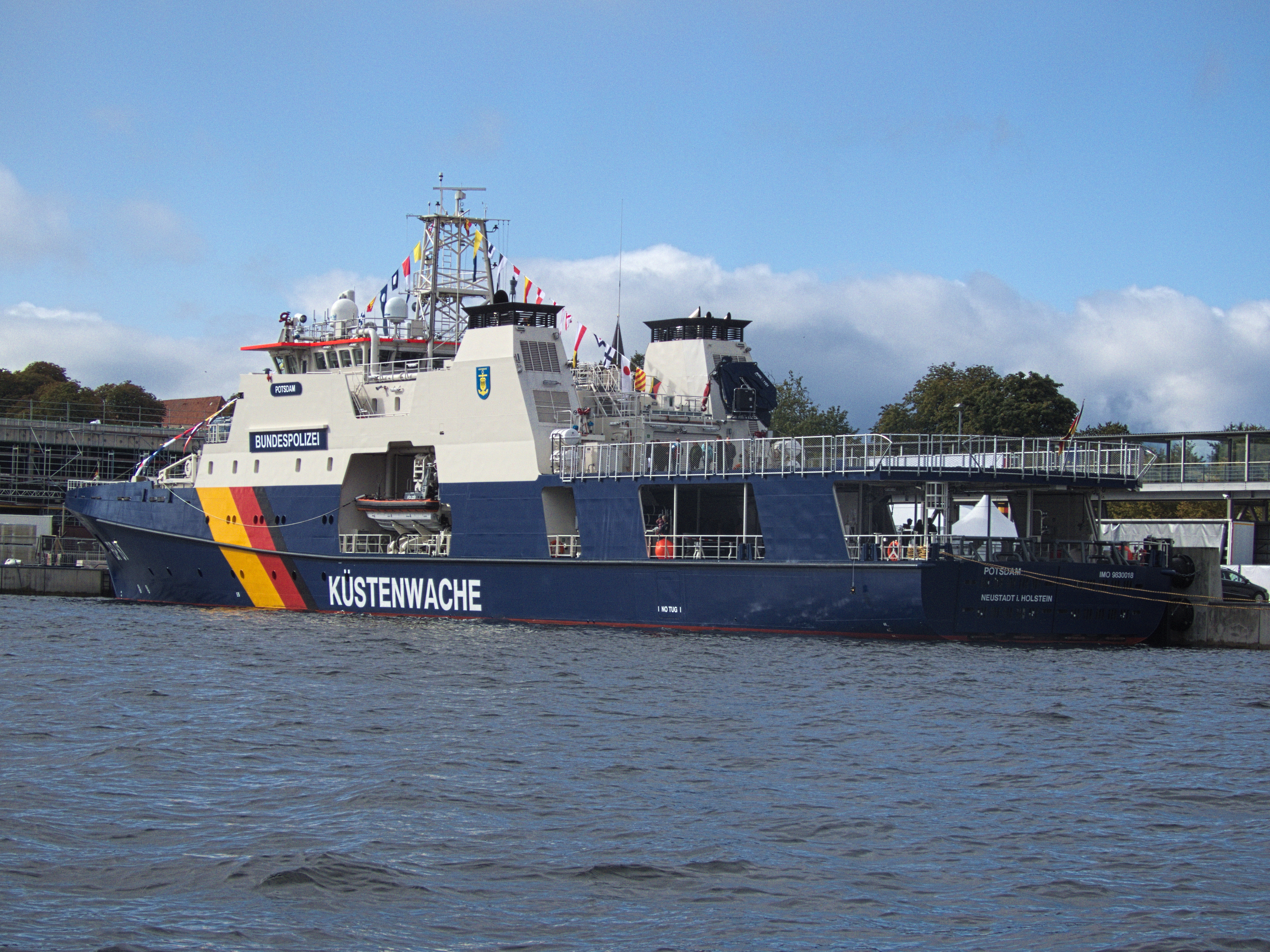
New Bundespolizei offshore patrol vessel BP 81 Potsdam

- Potsdam class (2019–present)
- Bad Bramstedt class (2002–present)
- Helgoland class (2009–present)
- PA class (1943–1945)
- R boats (1929–1945)
- Type 139 patrol trawler (1956 to mid-1970s)

=== Greece ===
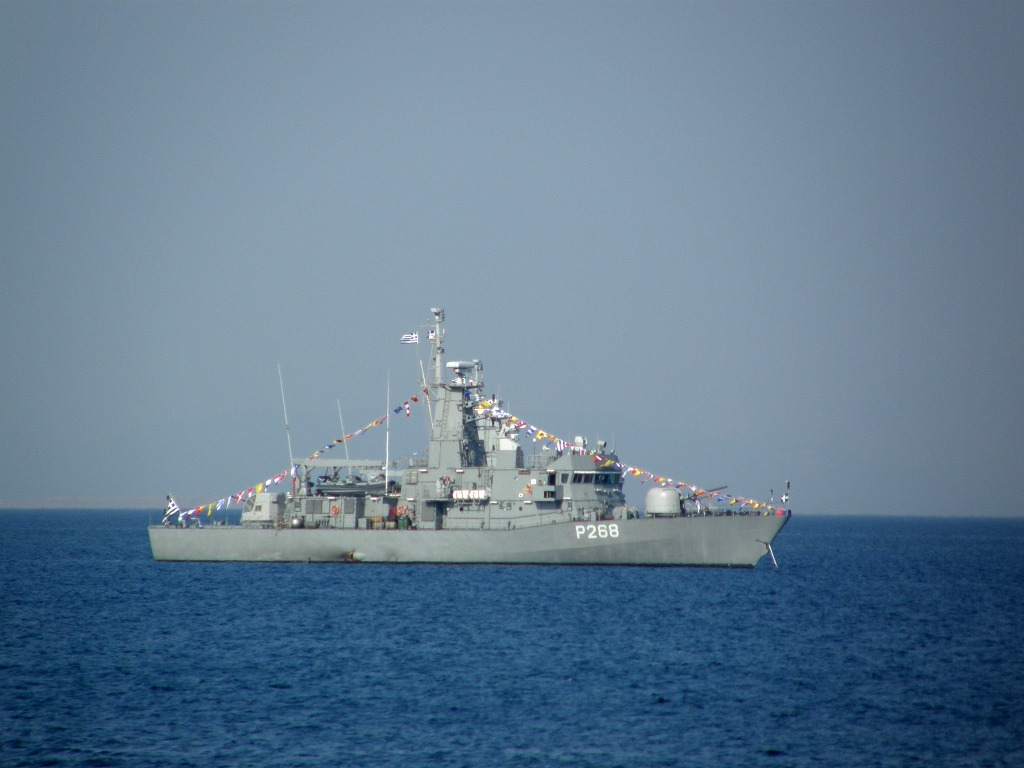
Hellenic Navy HSY-56A gunboat HS Aittitos

==== Hellenic Navy ====
- Osprey 55-class gunboats and derivatives HSY-55 and Osprey HSY-56A
- Asheville-class gunboats
- Nasty-class coastal patrol vessels – formerly torpedo boats
- Esterel-class coastal patrol vessels

==== Hellenic Coast Guard ====
- Sa'ar 4 class – acting as offshore patrol vessels (OPV)
- Stan Patrol 5509 OPV
- Vosper Europatrol 250 Mk1 OPV
- Abeking & Rasmussen patrol vessels – class Dilos
- POB-24G patrol vessels – class Faiakas
- CB90-HCG
- Lambro 57 and derivatives – all being boats for coastal patrols

=== Honduras ===
==== Honduran Navy ====
- Damen Stan Patrol 4207

=== Hong Kong (SARPRC) ===
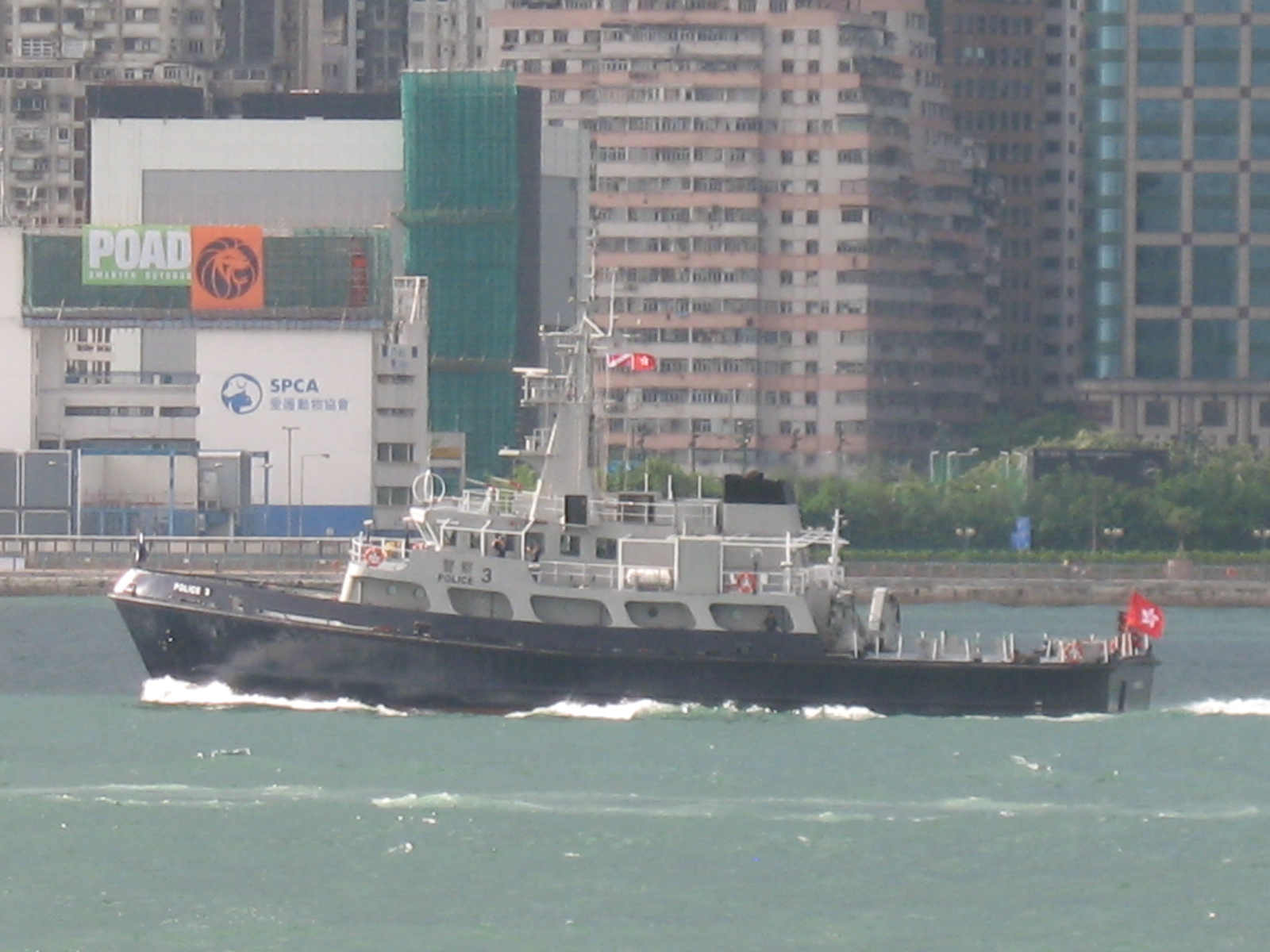
Sea Panther (PL 3), a Sea Panther-class large command boat with the Hong Kong Police Marine Unit

==== Hong Kong Police Force ====
- Sea Panther-class large command boat

=== Iceland ===
==== Icelandic Coast Guard ====
- ICGV Týr
- ICGV Óðinn
- ICGV Þór
- ICGV Ægir
- ICGV Freyja

=== India ===
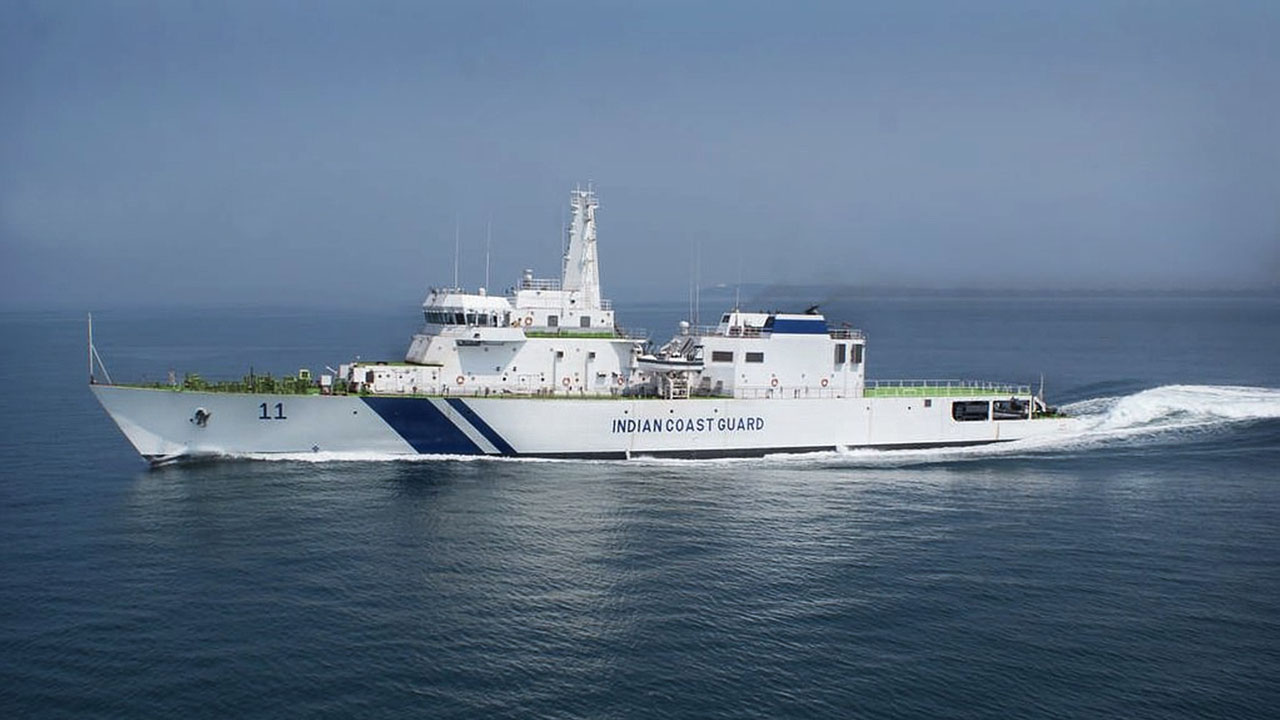
The Indian Coast Guard's offshore patrol vessel ICGS Samarth at sea.

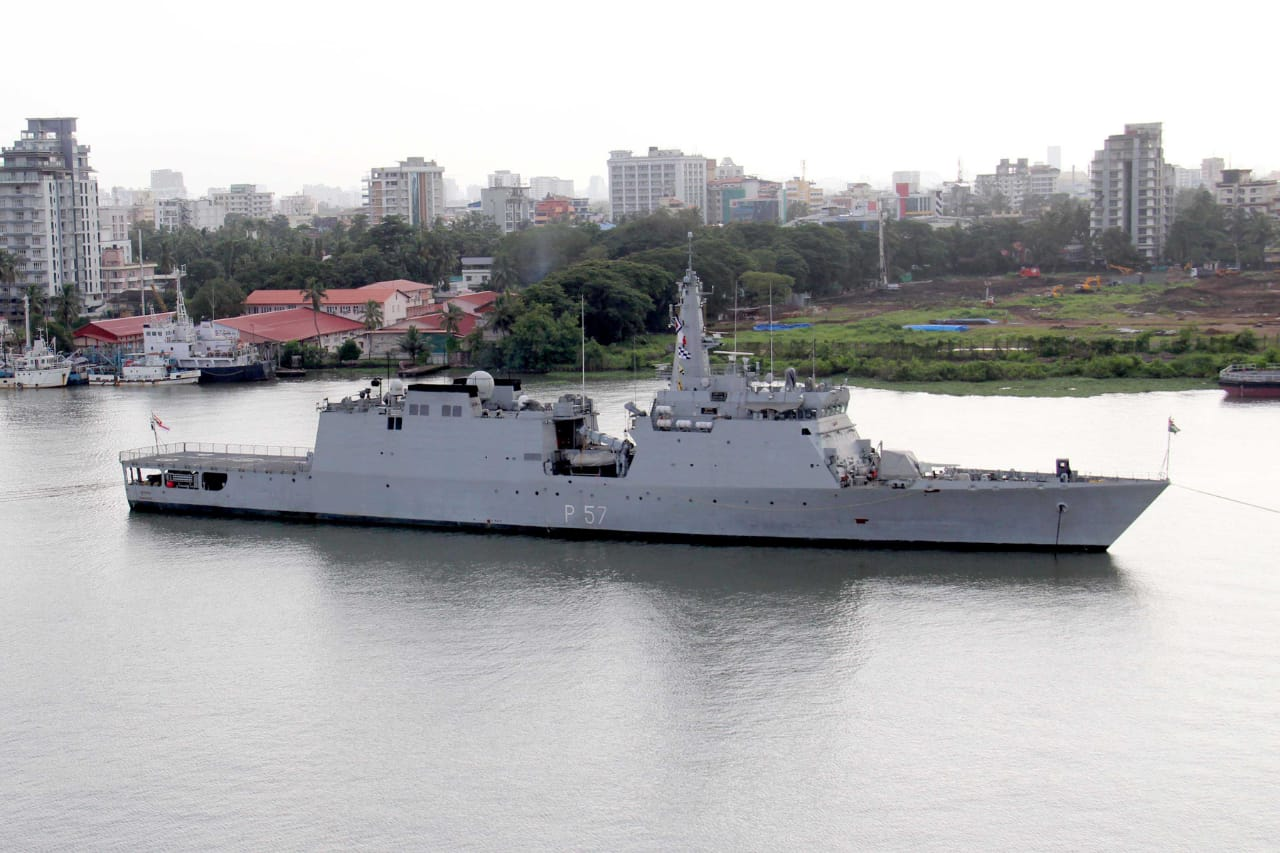
INS Sunayna (P57) returns to Kochi post an 80-day anti piracy patrol in the Gulf of Aden

==== Indian Navy ====
- Bangaram-class patrol vessel
- Car Nicobar-class patrol vessel
- Saryu-class patrol vessel
- Sukanya-class patrol vessel
- Trinkat-class patrol vessel

==== Indian Coast Guard ====
- Aadesh-class patrol vessel
- Rajshree-class patrol vessel
- Rani Abbakka-class patrol vessel
- Samar-class offshore patrol vessel
- Samarth-class offshore patrol vessel
- Sankalp-class offshore patrol vessel
- Sarojini Naidu-class patrol vessel
- Tara Bai-class patrol vessel
- Vikram-class offshore patrol vessel
- Vishwast-class offshore patrol vessel

=== Indonesia ===
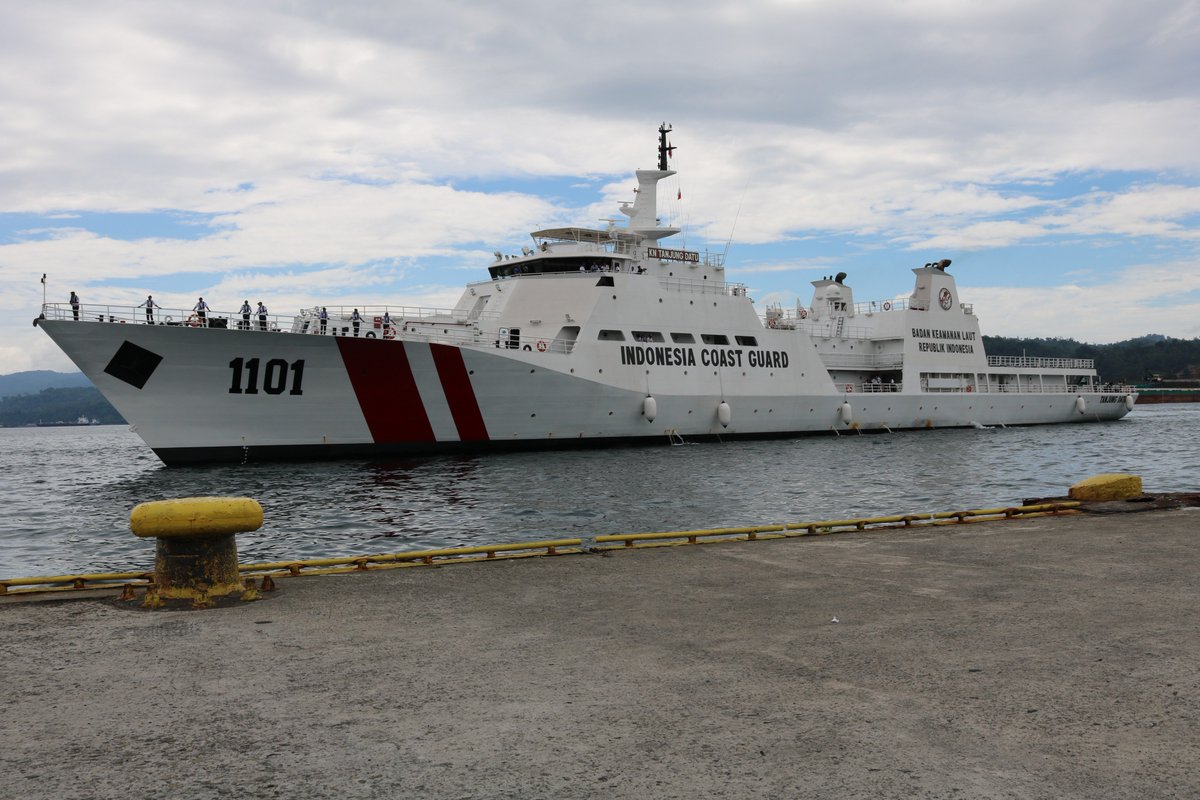
KN Tanjung Datu (1101) of the Indonesian Maritime Security Agency

- FPB 28, Indonesian Police and Indonesian Customs, 28 meter long patrol boat made by local shipyard PT PAL.
- FPB 38, Indonesian Customs, 38 meter long aluminium patrol boat made by local shipyard PT PAL.
- FPB 57, Indonesian Navy, 57 meter long patrol boat designed by Lürssen and made by PT PAL, ASM and heli deck equipped for some version.
- Pari class, Indonesian Navy, also designated as the PC-40 or PC-40M, is a 40 meter long patrol boat variant of the Clurit Class fast attack craft.
- Dorang class, Indonesian Navy, also designated as the PC-60 or PC-60M, is a 60 meter long patrol boat variant based of the Sampari Class fast attack craft. The ships can be modified to be equipped with anti ship missiles when required.
- Klewang class, Indonesian Navy, 63-meter-long composite material, is armed with 120 km range of anti-ship missile, made by PT Lundin industry
- Raja Haji Fisabililah class, Indonesian Navy. The ships of the class are 98 meters long, and equipped with a 76 mm gun, CIWS, 8 Atmaca, and have a ramp for RHIBs.
- Pulau Nipah class, BAKAMLA, 80 meter long OPV, designed by Terafulk and made by PT Citra Shipyard
- Tanjung Datu class, BAKAMLA, 110 meter long OPV, made by PT Palindo Marine Shipyard

=== Iran ===
Islamic Revolutionary Guard Corps Navy:

- Azarakhsh
- MK-13
- Zoljenah
- Bavar
- Zolfaghar
- Rezvan
- Tir
- Pashe
- Ghaem
- Gahjae
- Kajami
- Tarlan
- Taregh
- Ashura
- Murce
- Seraj
- Ashura-33
- MIL 40
- Cougar
- An unknown class of patrol boat
- Zulfighar

Islamic Republic of Iran Navy:

- Kaivan class
- Parvin class

=== Ireland ===
List of Irish Naval Service vessels;

- Emer-class Offshore Patrol Vessels
  - LÉ Deirdre (P20) (1972–2001)
  - LÉ Emer (P21) (1978–2013)
  - LÉ Aoife (P22) (1979–2015)
  - LÉ Aisling (P23) (1980–2016)
- Eithne-class Helicopter Patrol Vessel
  - LÉ Eithne (P31) (1984–2022)
- Peacock-class Coastal Patrol Vessels
  - LÉ Orla (P41) (1984–2022)
  - LÉ Ciara (P42) (1985–2022)
- Róisín-class Offshore Patrol Vessels
  - LÉ Róisín (P51) (1999–present)
  - LÉ Niamh (P52) (2001–present)
- Samuel Beckett-class Offshore Patrol Vessels
  - LÉ Samuel Beckett (P61) (2014–present)
  - LÉ James Joyce (P62) (2015–present)
  - LÉ William Butler Yeats (P63) (2016–present)
  - LÉ George Bernard Shaw (P64) (2018–present)

=== Israel ===
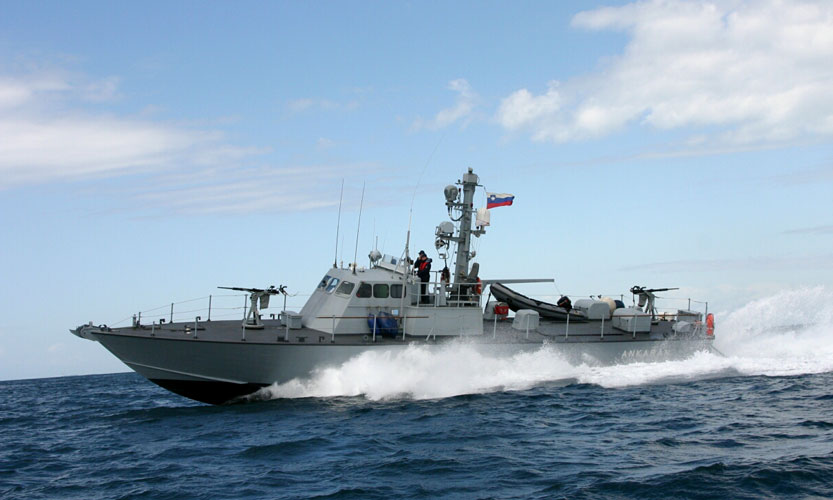
Slovenian Navy HPL-21, an example of the Israeli-made Super Dvora Mk II-class patrol boat also in service with the Israeli Navy

- Dabur-class patrol boats
- Dvora class fast patrol boat
- Super Dvora Mk II-class patrol boats
- Super Dvora Mk III-class patrol boat
- Shaldag-class patrol boats
  - Shaldag Mk II
- Nachshol-class patrol boats (Stingray Interceptor-2000)

=== Italy ===
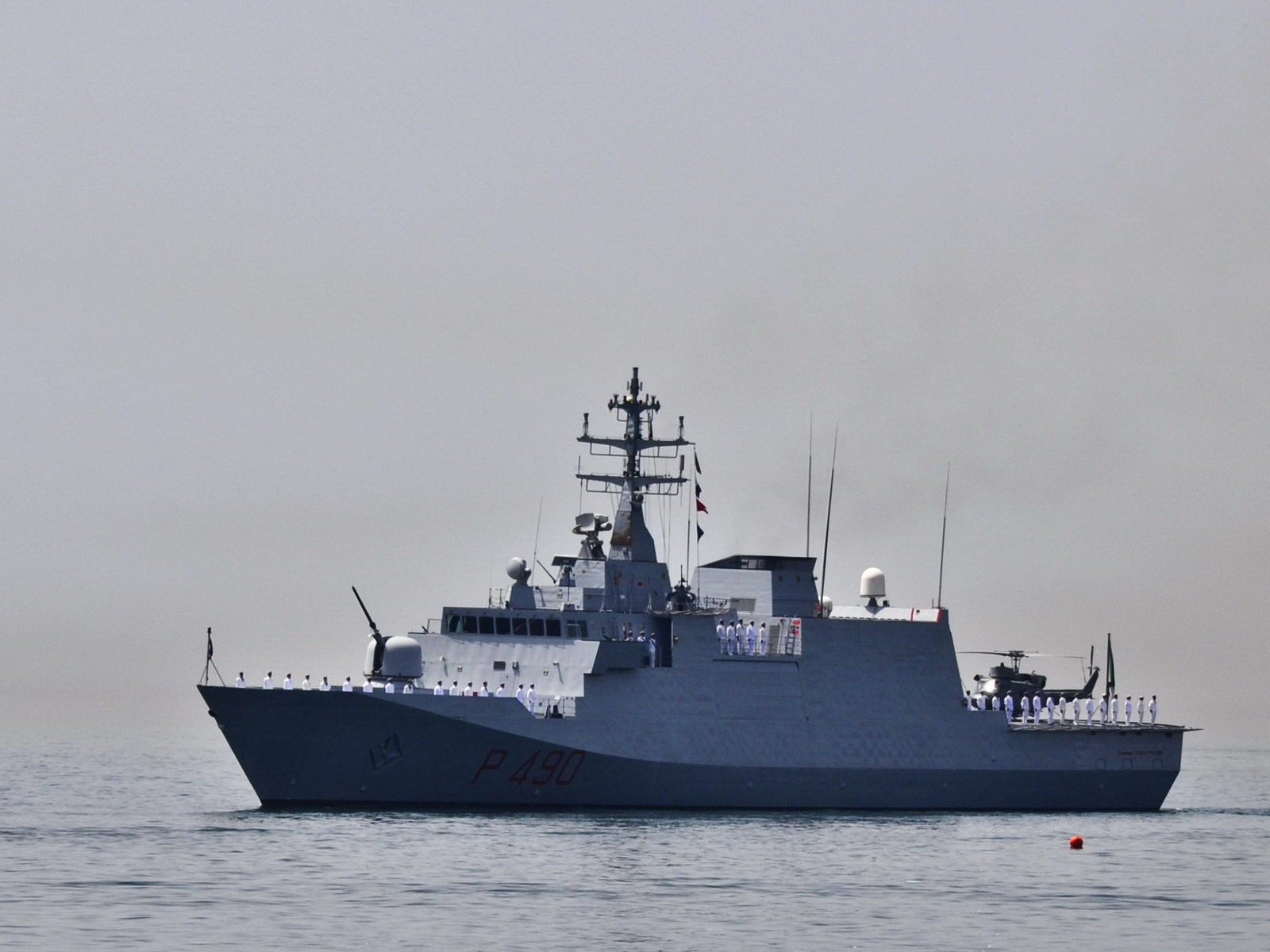
Italian Navy Comandanti-class Cigala Fulgosi

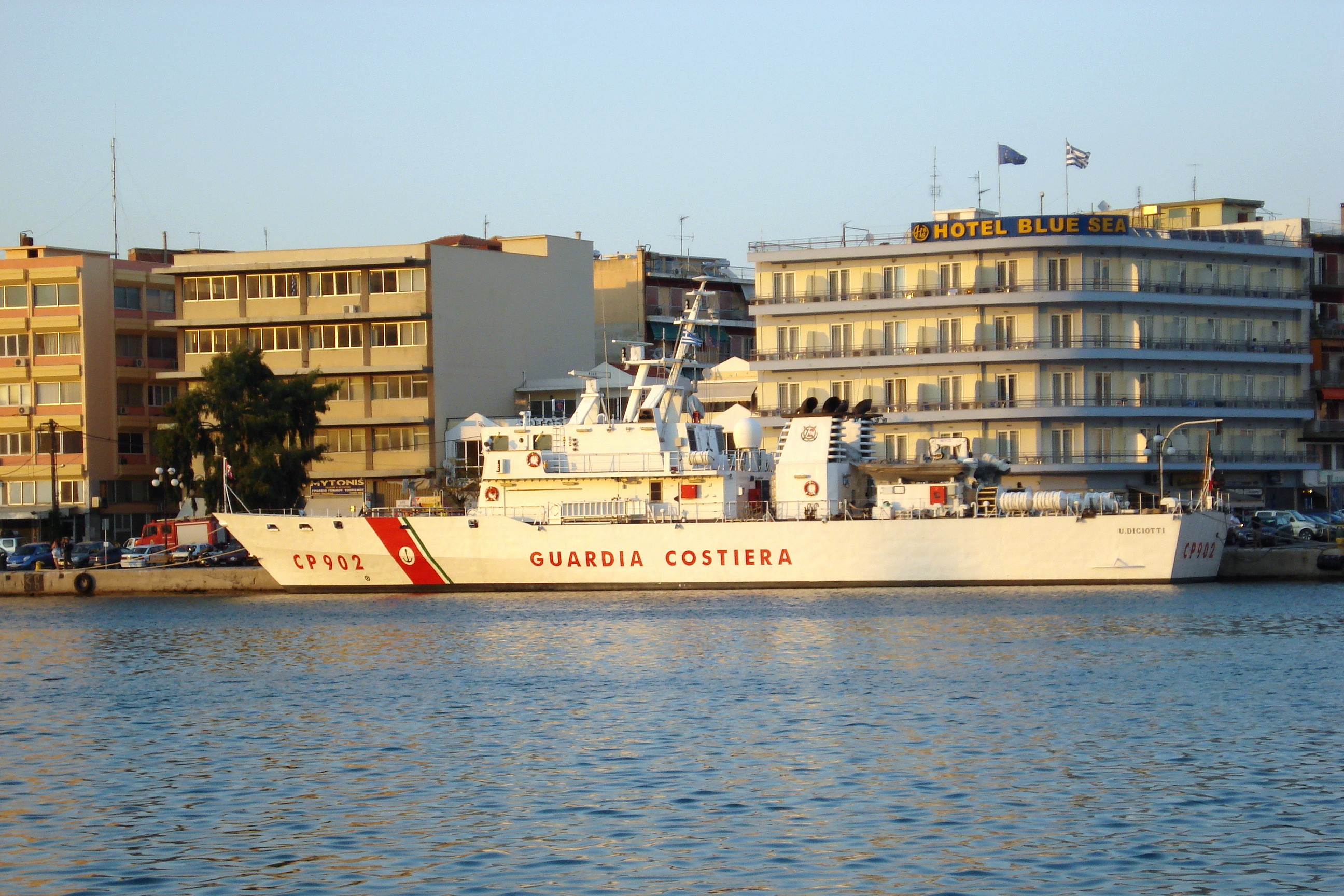
Italian Coast Guard patrol boat U. Diciotti, CP-902

- Zara class, (Italian Guardia di Finanza)
- Saettia class, (Italian Coast Guard)
- Diciotti – CP 902 class, (Italian Coast Guard)
- Dattilo-class offshore patrol vessel, (Italian Coast Guard)
- Mazzinghi-class patrol boat, (Italian Coast Guard)
- Cassiopea-class patrol vessel, (Italian Marina Militare)
- Cassiopea II class, (Italian Marina Militare)
- Esploratore class, (Italian Marina Militare)
- Comandanti-class patrol vessel, (Italian Marina Militare)

=== Jamaica ===
==== JDF Coast Guard ====
- County class

=== Japan ===
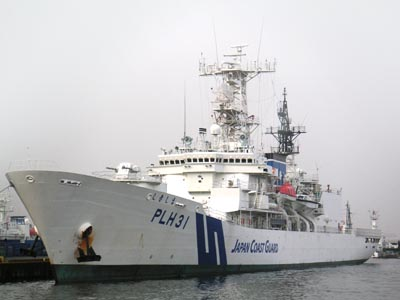
Shikishima (Japan Coast Guard), the 2nd largest patrol boat in the world

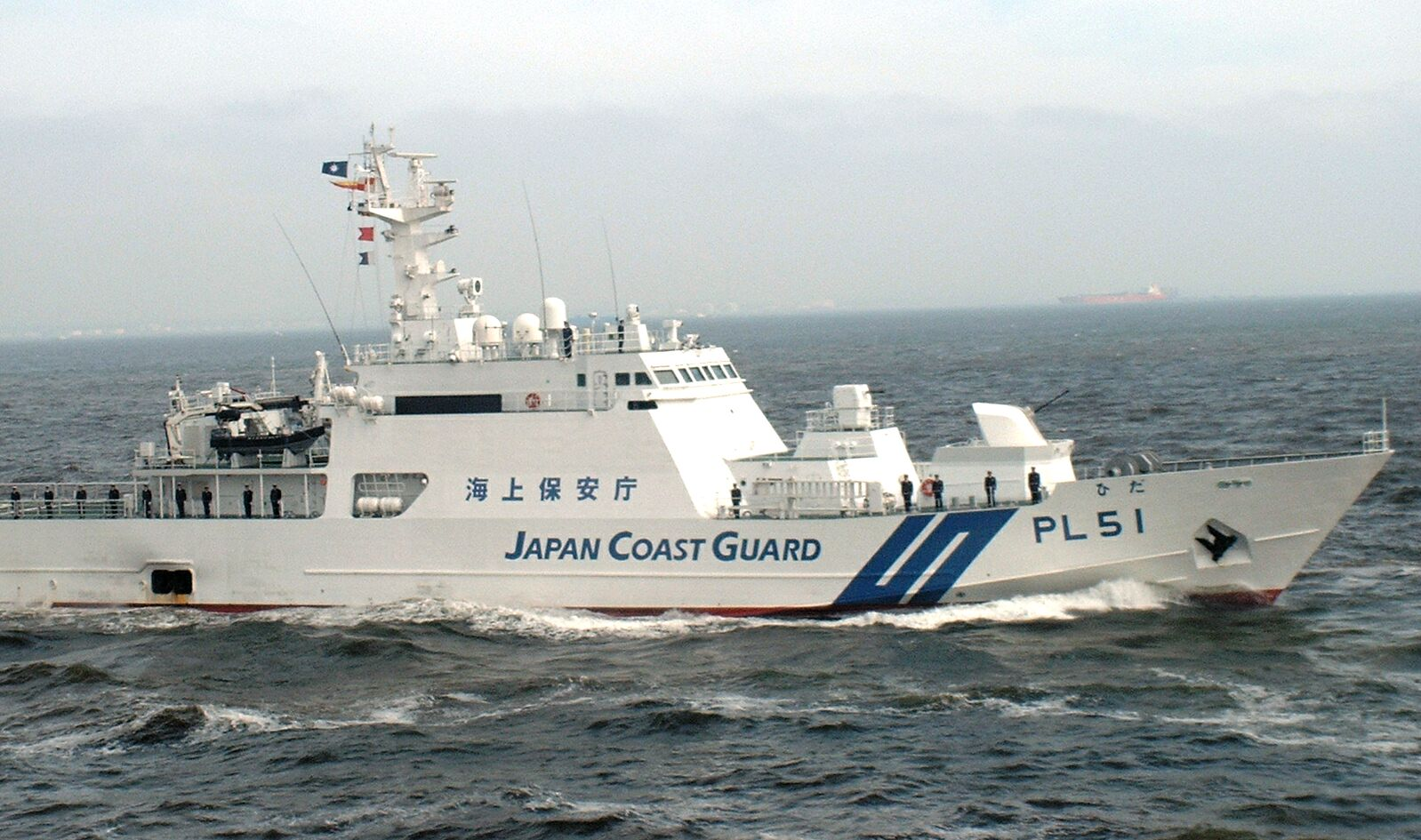
Japan Coast Guard Hida

- Shikishima (Japan Coast Guard), the 2nd largest patrol boat
- Mizuho class (Japan Coast Guard), large patrol vessel with helicopter deck and hangar
- Tsugaru class (Japan Coast Guard), large patrol vessel with helicopter deck and hangar
- Hida class (Japan Coast Guard), high-speed large patrol vessel with helicopter deck
- Kunigami class (Kunisaki class)
- Iwami class
- Hateruma class
- Aso class (Japan Coast Guard), high-speed large patrol vessel
- Amami class (Japan Coast Guard), medium-sized patrol vessel
- Hayabusa class (JMSDF, Japanese Navy), corvette type patrol vessel
- Sōya, (Japan Coast Guard), icebreaker
- Sakura class (JMSDF, Japanese Navy)

=== Latvia ===
- Skrunda class, world's first SWATH patrol boat (Latvian Naval Forces)

=== Malaysia ===
- Kedah class offshore patrol vessel, (Royal Malaysian Navy)
- Keris-class littoral mission ship, (Royal Malaysian Navy)
- Gagah Class Ship, Malaysian Maritime Enforcement Agency
- Ramunia Class Ship, Malaysian Maritime Enforcement Agency
- Nusa Class Ship, Malaysian Maritime Enforcement Agency
- Sipadan Class Ship, Malaysian Maritime Enforcement Agency
- Rhu Class Ship, Malaysian Maritime Enforcement Agency
- Pengawal Class Ship, Malaysian Maritime Enforcement Agency
- Peninjau Class Ship, Malaysian Maritime Enforcement Agency
- Pelindung Class Ship, Malaysian Maritime Enforcement Agency
- Semilang Class Ship, Malaysian Maritime Enforcement Agency
- Penggalang Class Ship, Malaysian Maritime Enforcement Agency
- Penyelamat Class Ship, Malaysian Maritime Enforcement Agency
- Pengaman Class Ship, Malaysian Maritime Enforcement Agency
- Kilat Class Ship, Malaysian Maritime Enforcement Agency
- Malawali Class Ship, Malaysian Maritime Enforcement Agency
- Langkawi Class Patrol Ship, Malaysian Maritime Enforcement Agency
- Tun Fatimah Class Ship, Malaysian Maritime Enforcement Agency

=== Malta ===
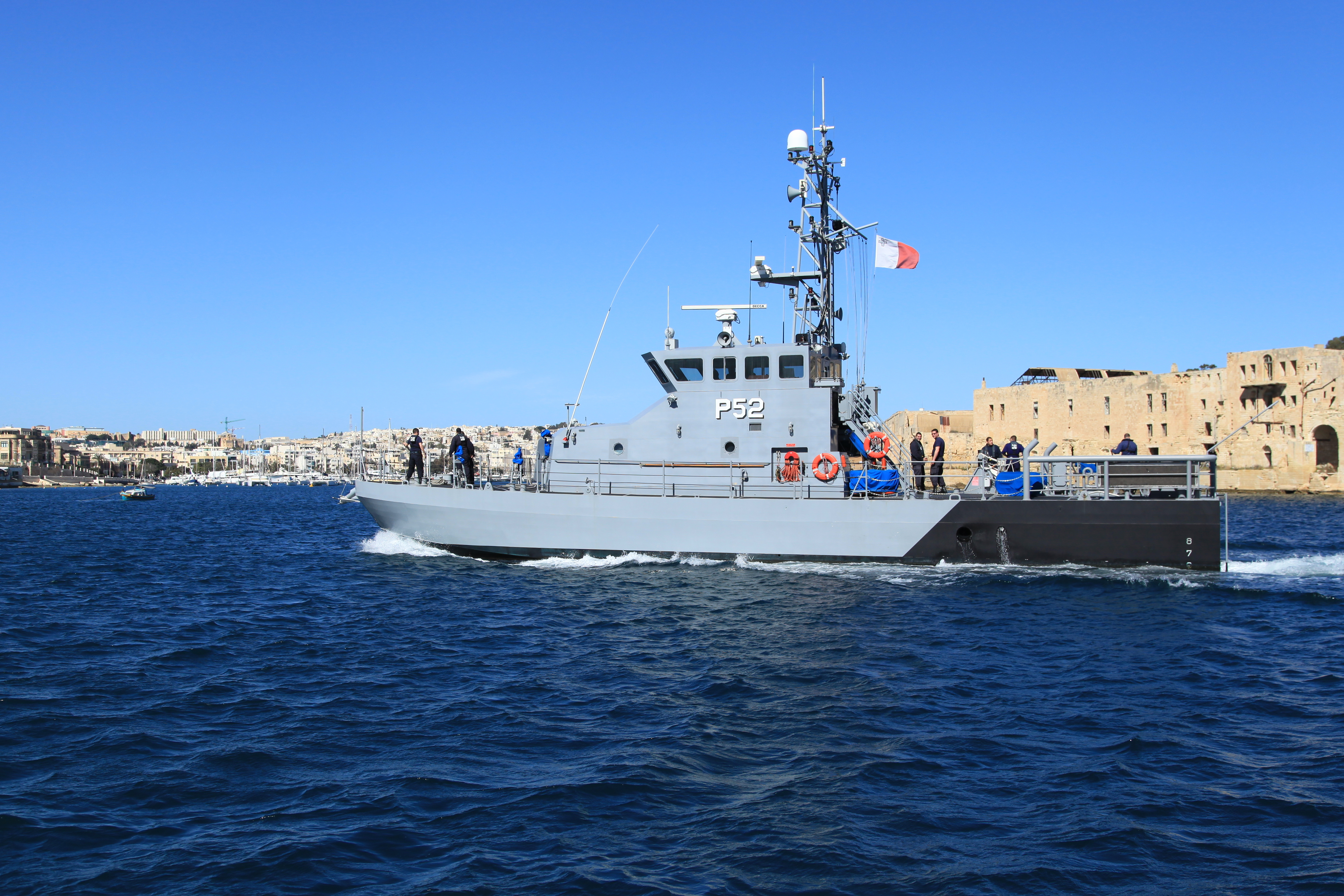
Protector class patrol boat P52 of the Maritime Squadron of the Armed Forces of Malta.

- Protector class offshore patrol vessel (Maritime Squadron of the Armed Forces of Malta) – 2002–present
- Diciotti class offshore patrol vessel (Maritime Squadron of the Armed Forces of Malta) – 2005–present
- P21 class inshore patrol vessel (Maritime Squadron of the Armed Forces of Malta) – 2010–present
- Emer class offshore patrol vessel (Maritime Squadron of the Armed Forces of Malta) – 2015–present

=== Mexico ===
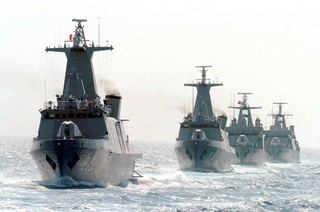
Durango-class offshore patrol vessels in formation.

==== Mexican Navy ====
- Coastal patrol boat
  - Azteca-class
  - Tenochtitlan-class
- Offshore patrol vessel
  - Durango-class
  - Holzinger-class
  - Oaxaca-class
  - Uribe-class

=== Montenegro ===
- Kotor class frigate

=== Morocco ===
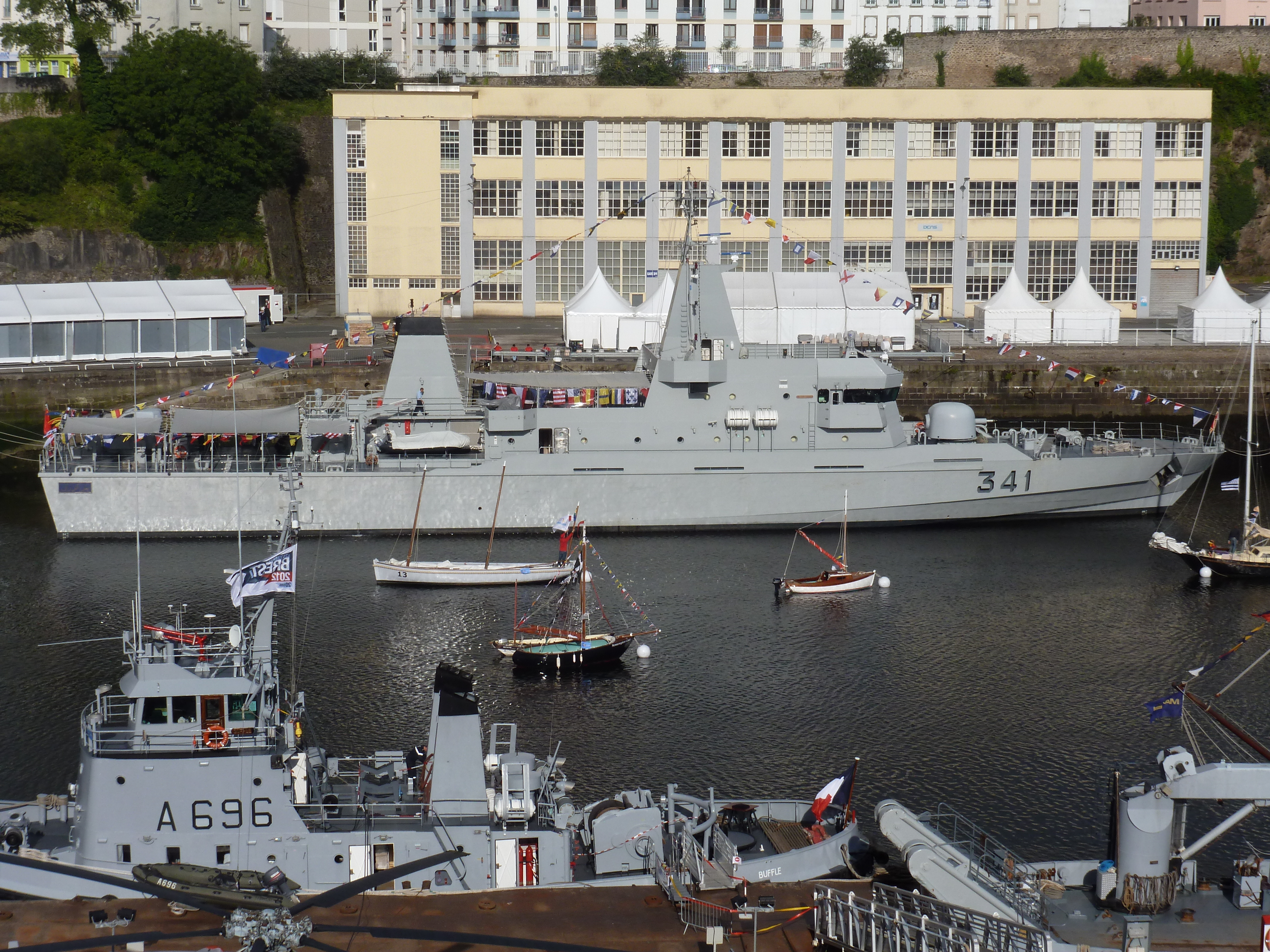
Royal Moroccan Navy OPV-70

- OPV-70 class, offshore patrol vessel (Royal Moroccan Navy)
- OPV-64 class, offshore patrol vessel (Royal Moroccan Navy)

=== Namibia ===
- Grajaú-class offshore patrol vessel

=== Netherlands ===
==== Royal Netherlands Navy ====
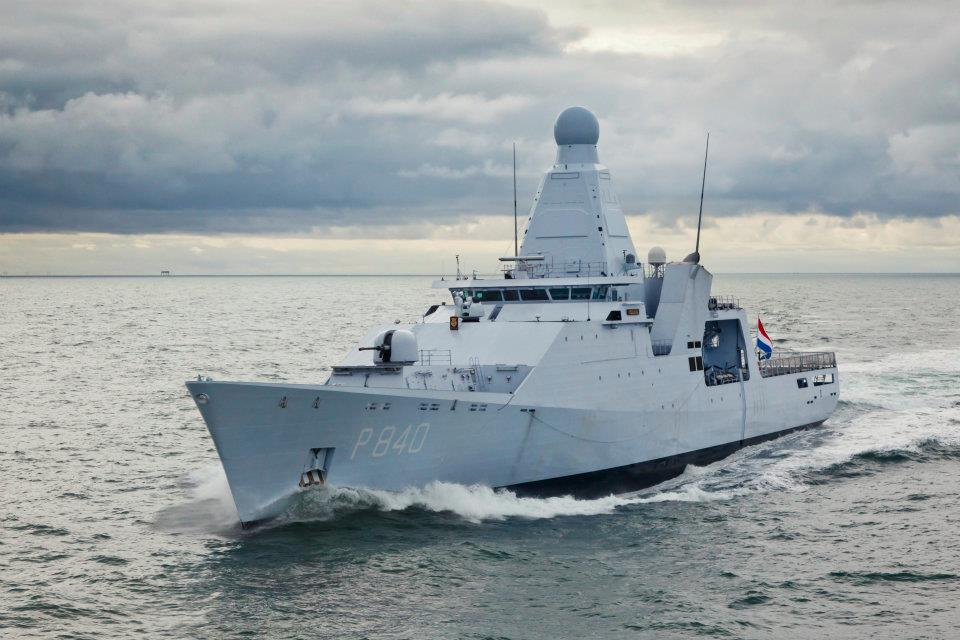
HNLMS Holland (P840), Holland-class OPV of the Dutch Navy

- Holland class offshore patrol vessels

==== Netherlands Coastguard ====
- Visarend
- Zeearend
- Barend Biesheuvel

==== Dutch Caribbean Coast Guard ====
- Damen Stan Patrol 4100

=== New Zealand ===
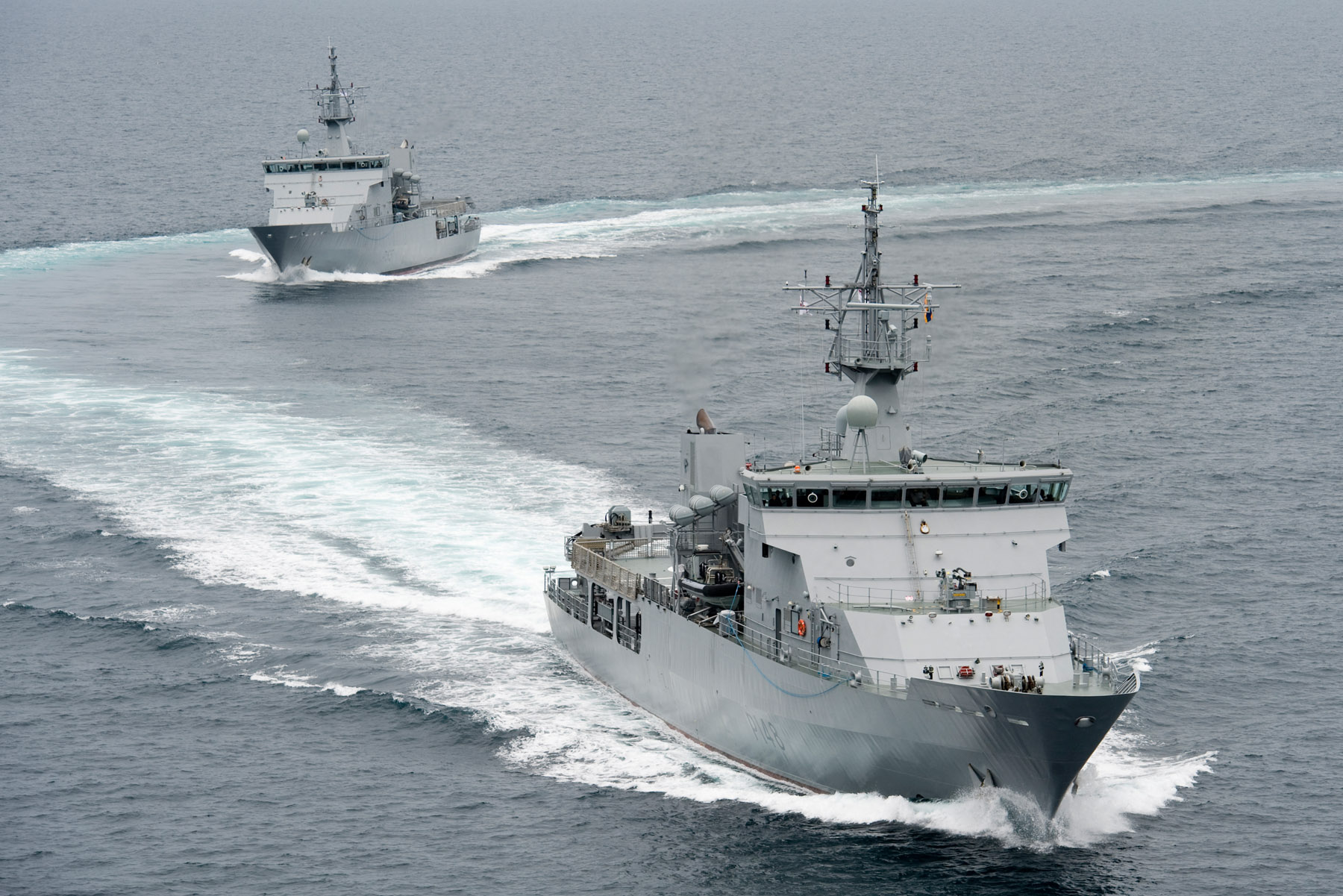
Both RNZN Protector-class offshore patrol vessels in 2010

==== Royal New Zealand Navy ====
- Protector-class OPV (2008)
- Lake-class IPV (2008)
- Moa-class patrol boat (1983–2008)

=== Nicaragua ===
==== Nicaraguan Navy ====
- County class

=== Norway ===
==== Royal Norwegian Navy ====
- Rapp-class
- Tjeld-class
- Storm-class
- Snøgg-class
- Hauk-class
- Skjold-class

==== Norwegian Coast Guard ====
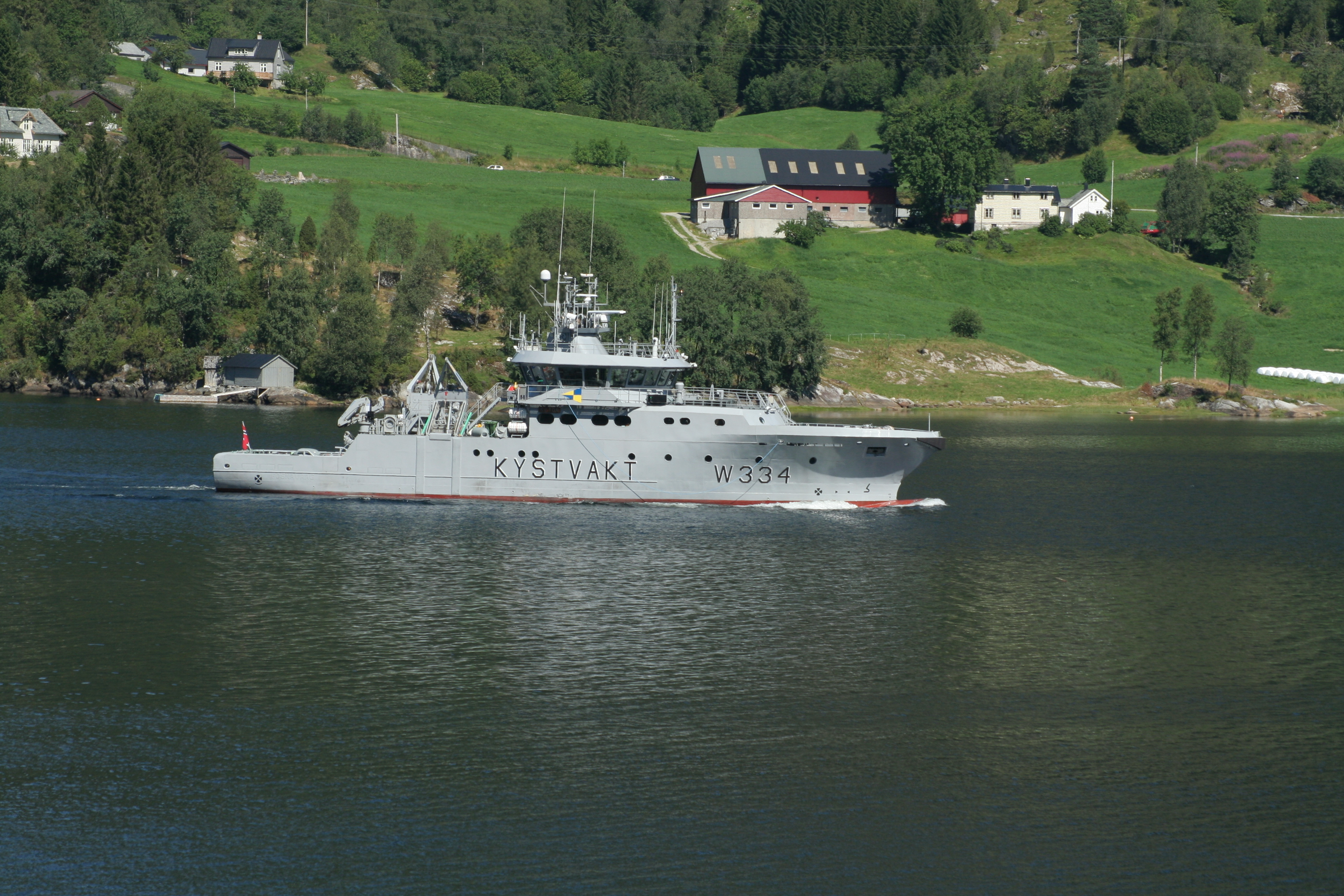
NoCGV Tor (W334 KYSTVAKT) from Nornen Class of the Norwegian Coast Guard

- Barentshav class OPV
- Harstad class OPV
- Nordkapp class OPV
- Nornen class
- Svalbard class icebreaker
- Jan Mayen-class - Planned replacement for the Nordkapp-class

=== Pakistan ===
==== Pakistan Navy ====
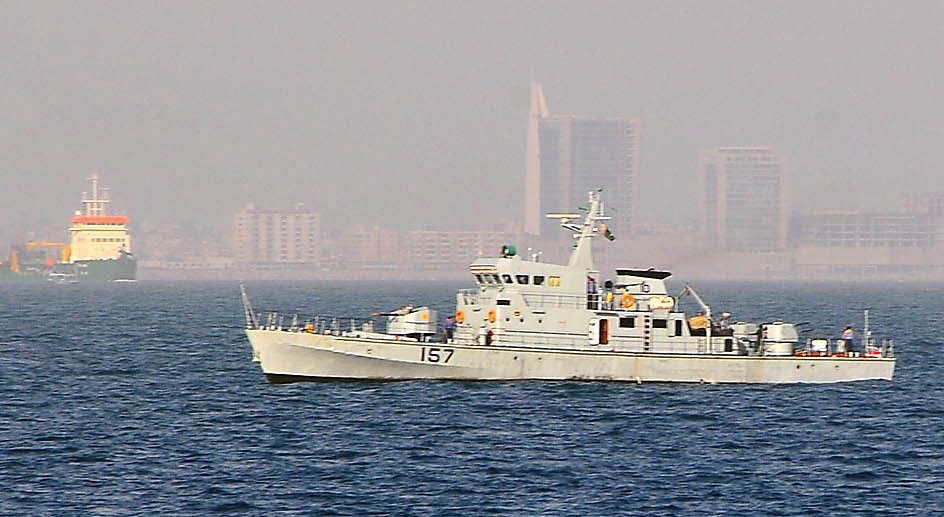
PNS Larkana

- Marine Assault Boats (MAB) - Jointly developed with Poland
- Larkana class

==== Pakistan Maritime Security Agency ====
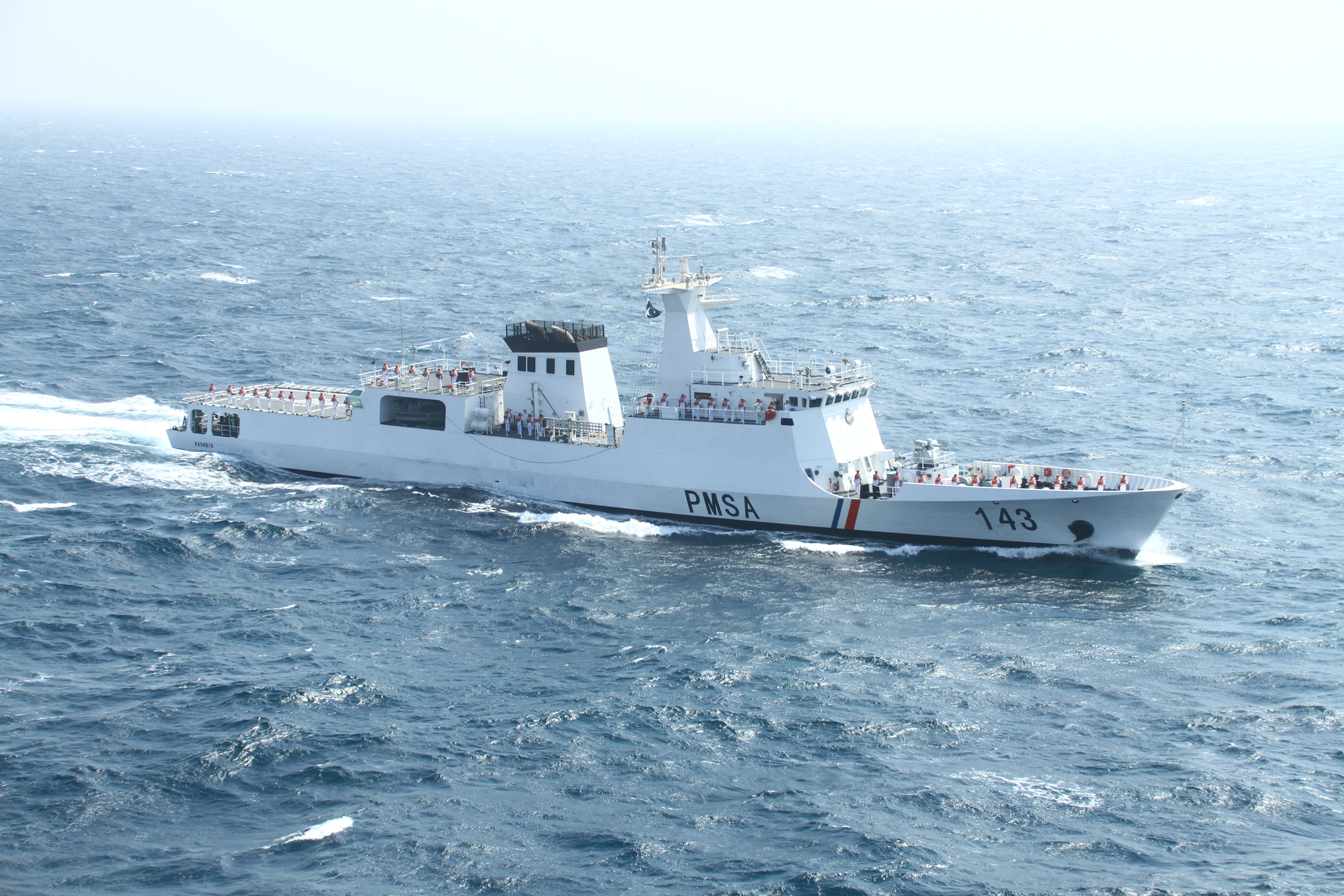
PMSS Kashmir

- Kashmir-class
- Hingol-class

=== Peru ===
- Río Zarumilla class, Peruvian Coast Guard
- Rio Cañete class, Peruvian Coast Guard

=== Philippines ===
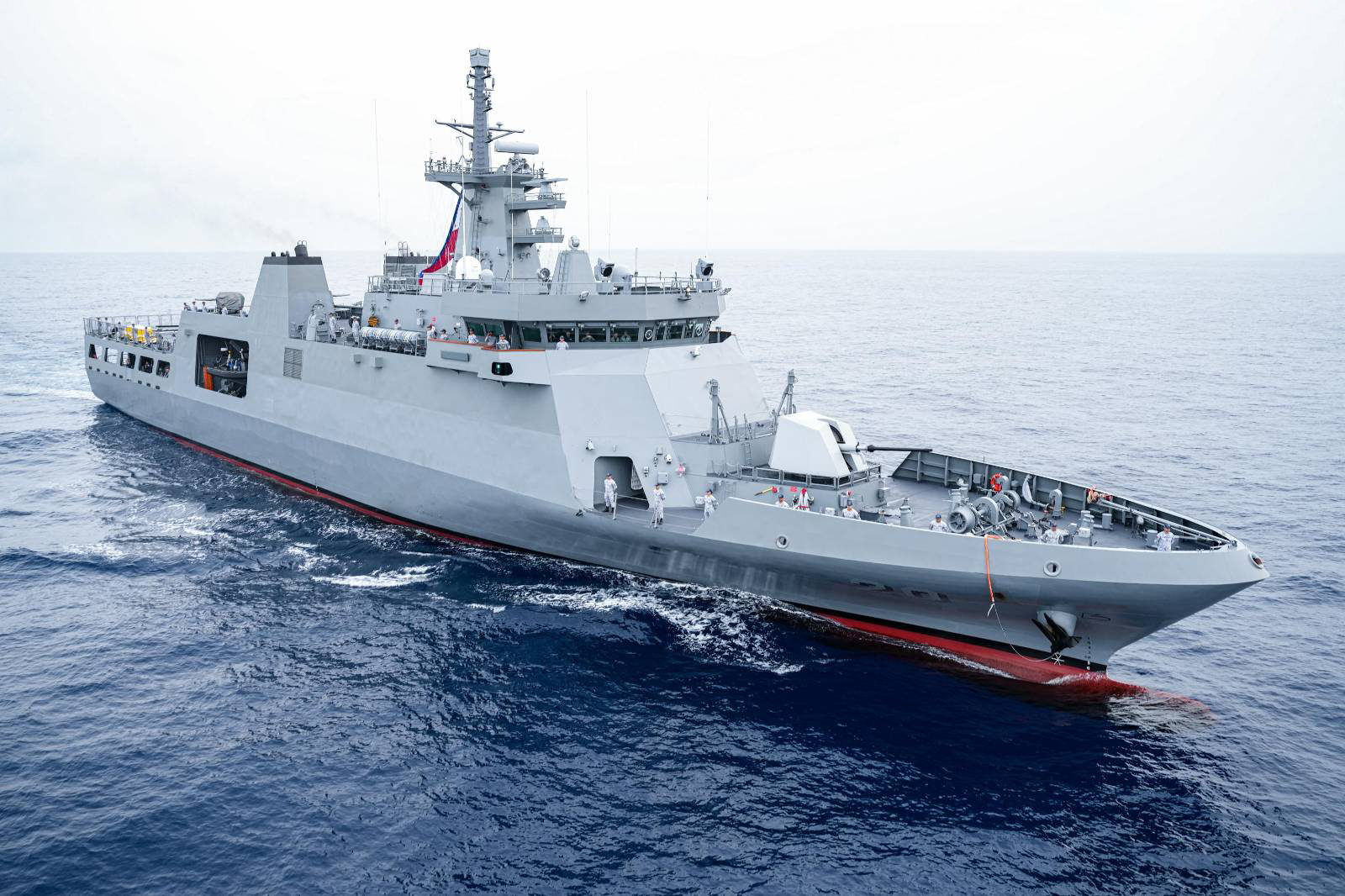
BRP Rajah Sulayman PS-20, Philippine Navy

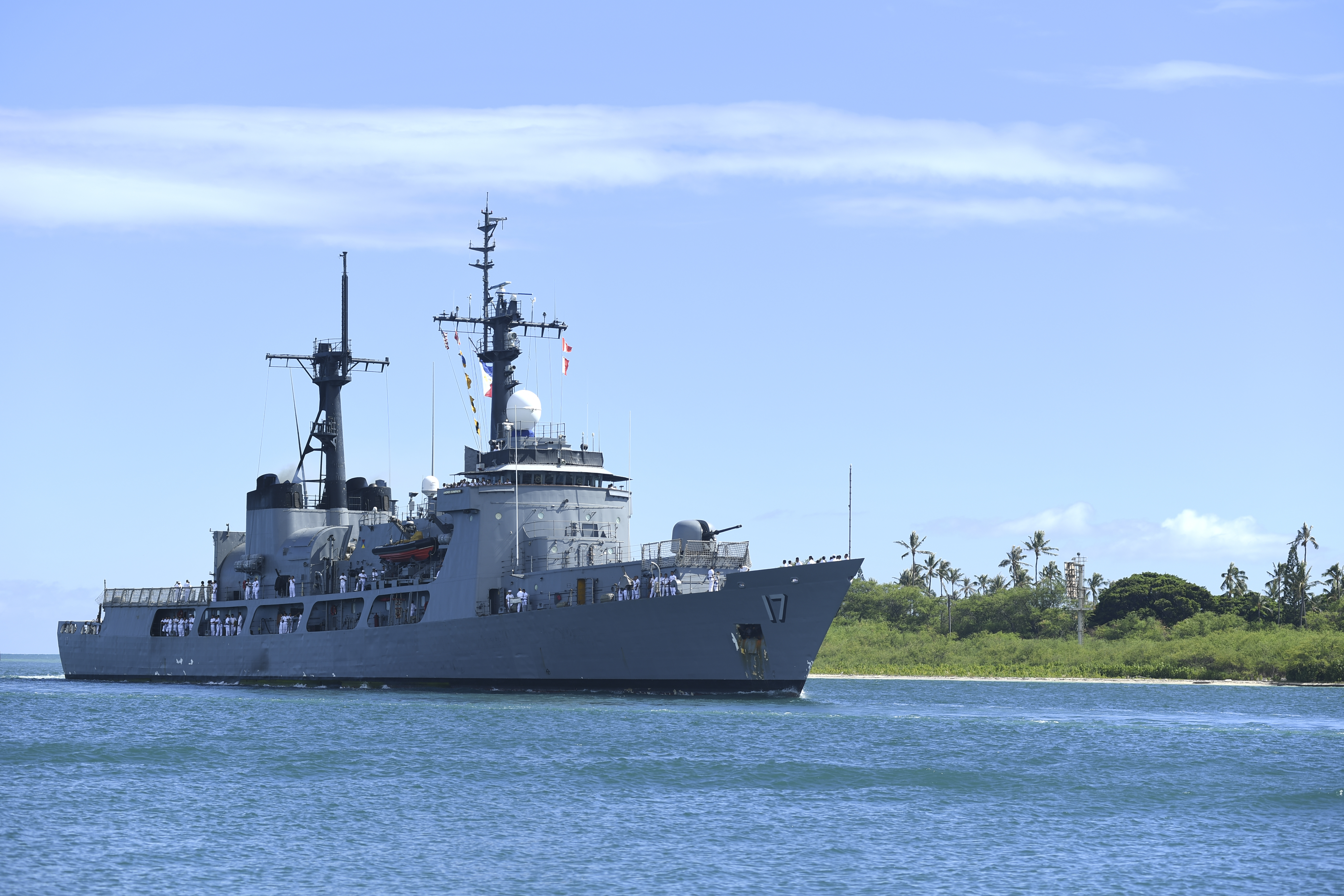
Gregorio del Pilar-class offshore patrol vessel, BRP Andres Bonifacio Arrives in Hawaii for RIMPAC 2018, Philippine Navy

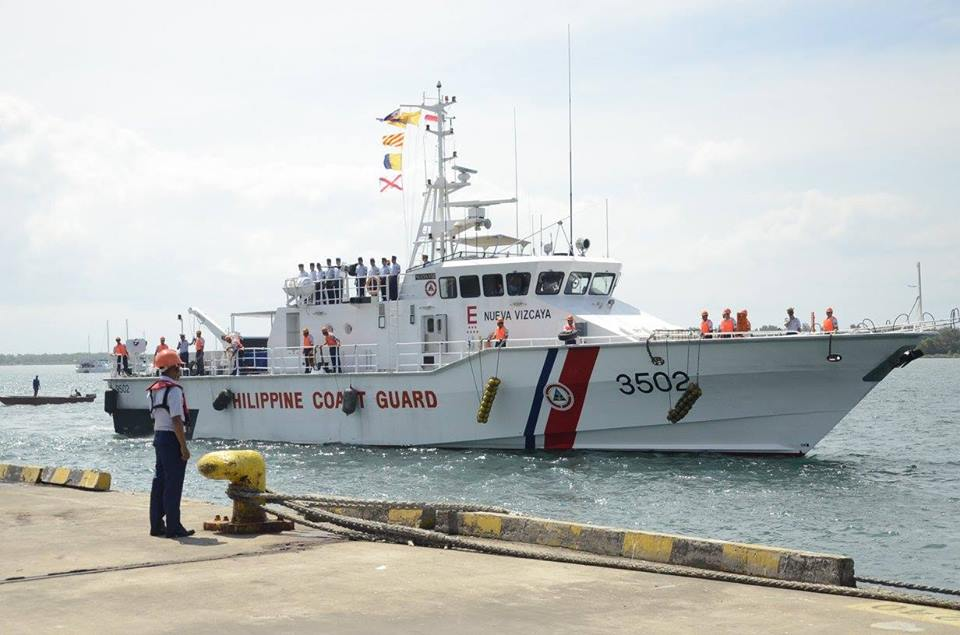
Ilocos Norte-class patrol boat, Philippine Coast Guard

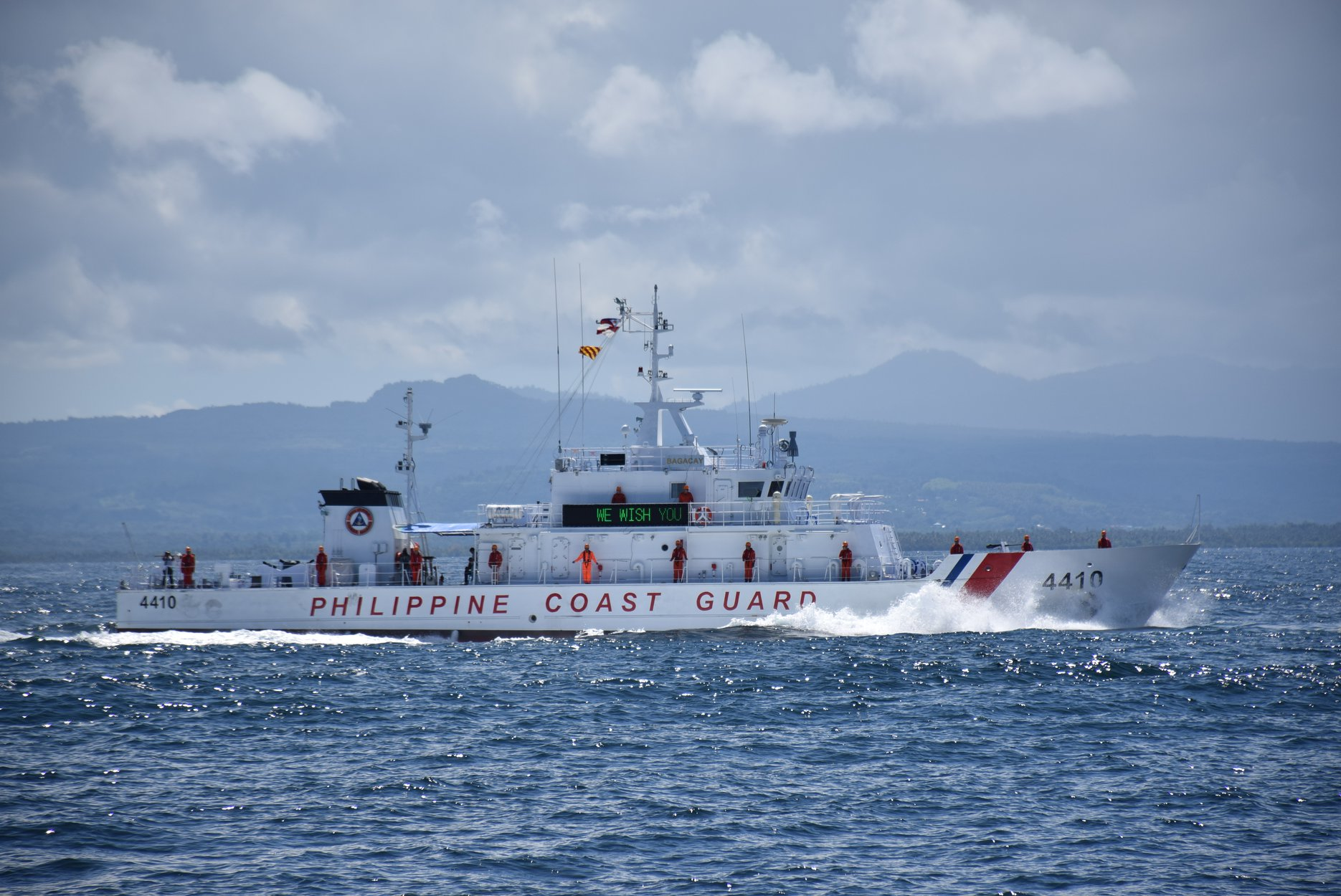
Parola-class patrol vessel, Philippine Coast Guard

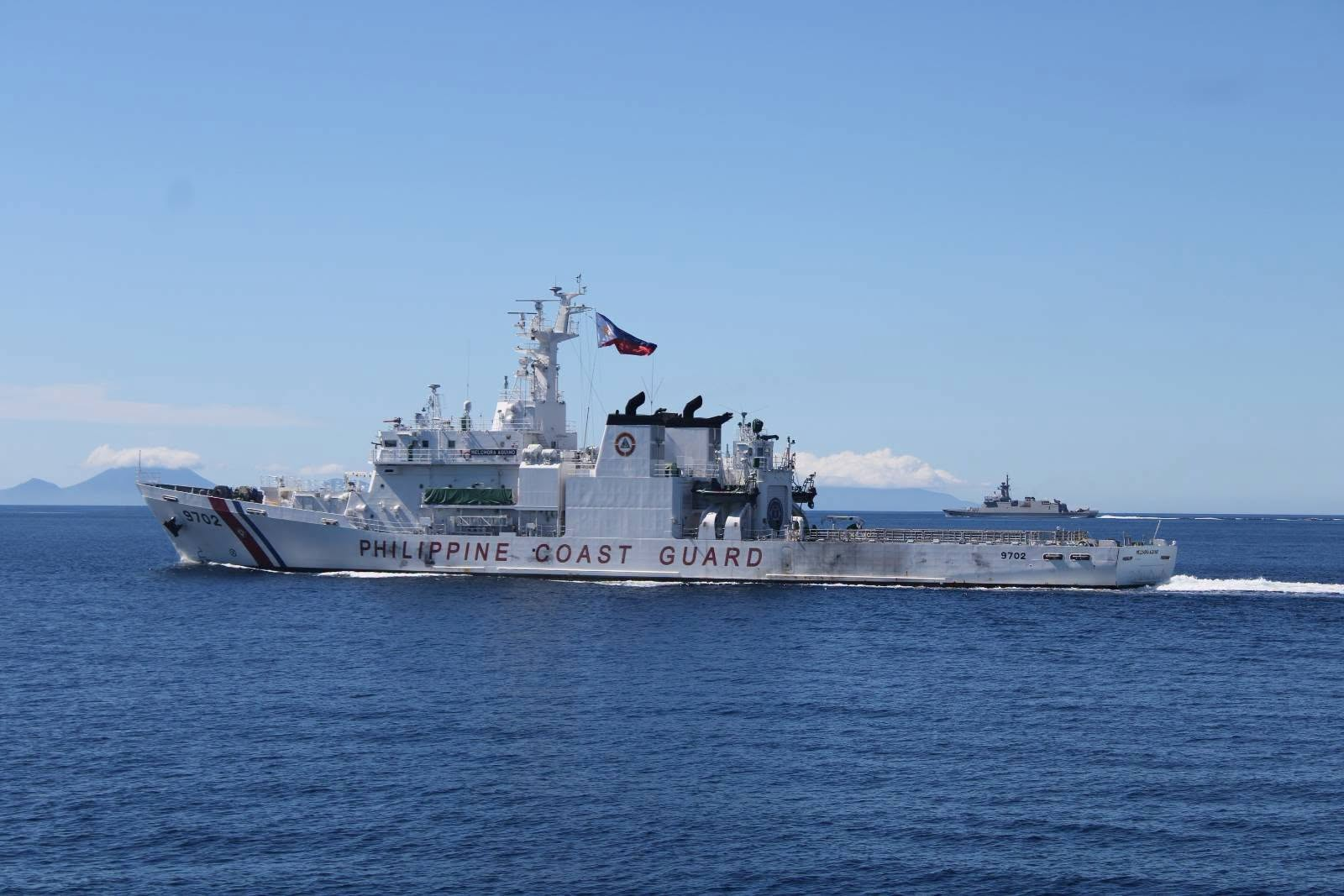
Teresa Magbanua-class patrol vessel, Philippine Coast Guard

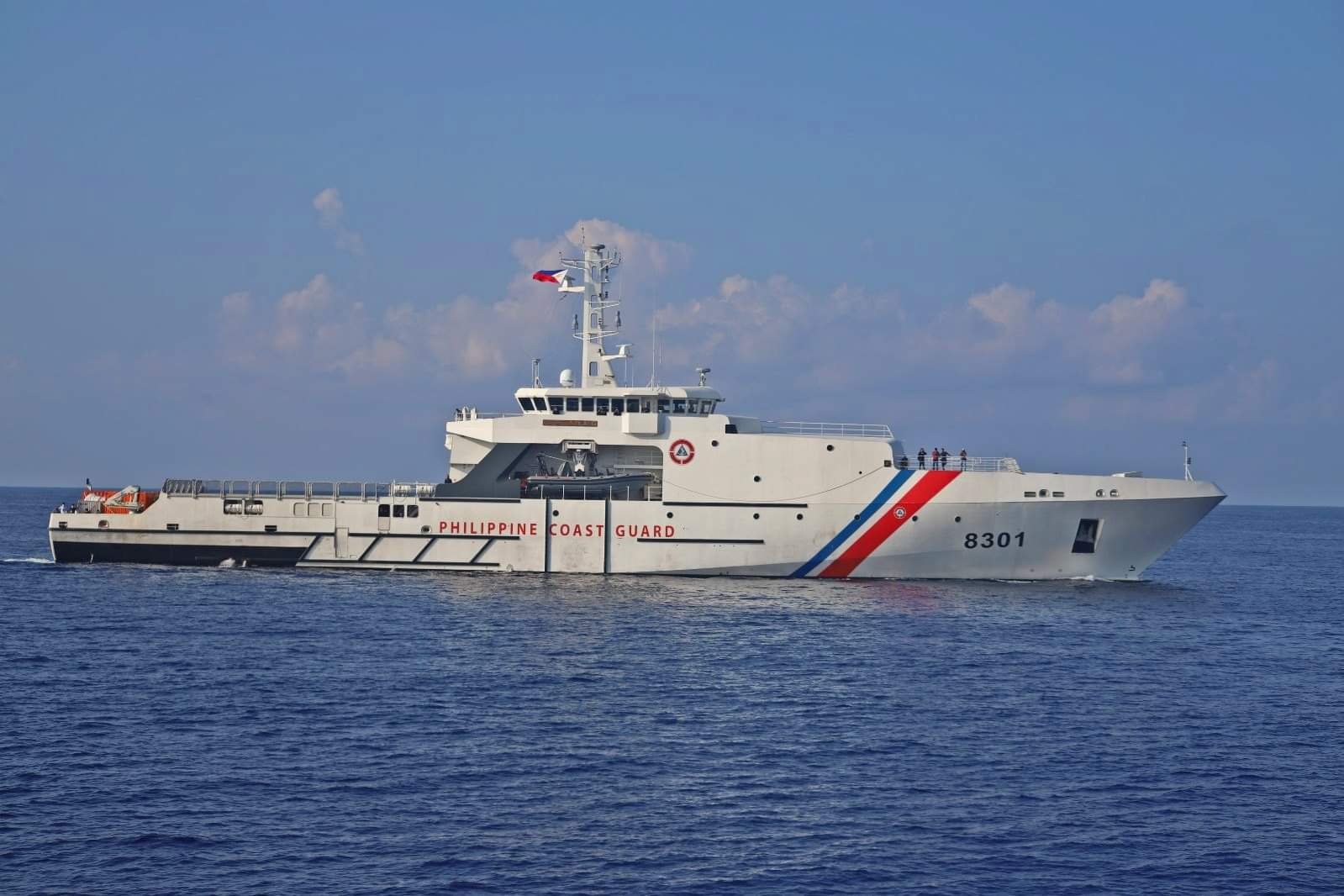
Gabriela Silang-class offshore patrol vessel, Philippine Coast Guard

==== Philippine Navy ====
- Jose Andrada-class
- Alberto Navarette-class
- Nestor Acero-class
- Jacinto-class
- Rajah Sulayman-class
- Gregorio del Pilar-class
- Mariano Alvarez-class
- Kagitingan-class

==== Philippine Coast Guard ====
- Boracay-class patrol boat
- Ilocos Norte-class patrol boat
- Parola-class patrol vessel
- San Juan-class patrol vessel
- Gabriela Silang-class offshore patrol vessel
- Teresa Magbanua-class patrol vessel
- FPB 110 PCG class

=== Poland ===
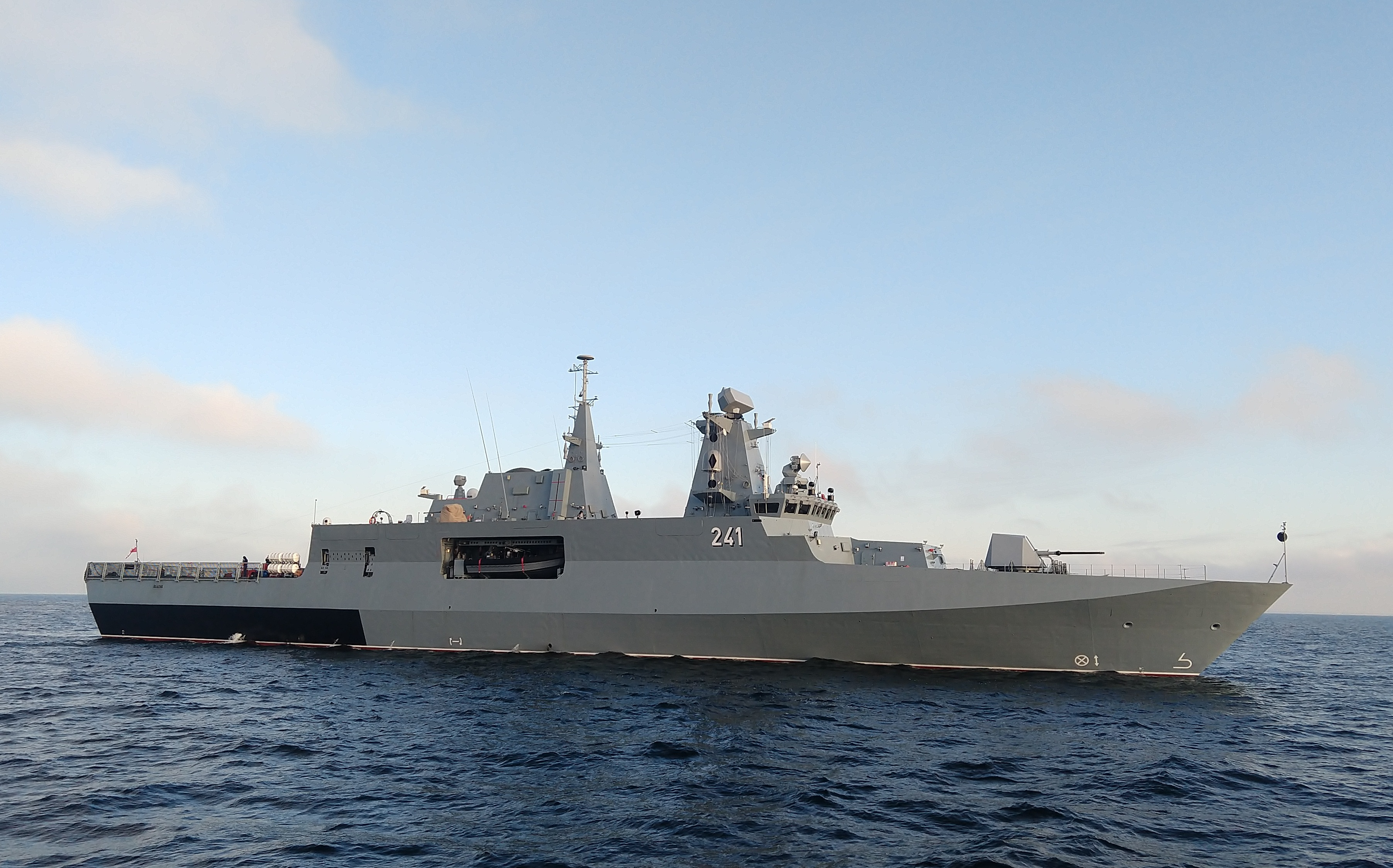
ORP Ślązak, Projekt 621M-class offshore patrol vessel, Polish Navy

==== Polish Navy ====
- Projekt 621M-class offshore patrol vessel

=== Portugal ===
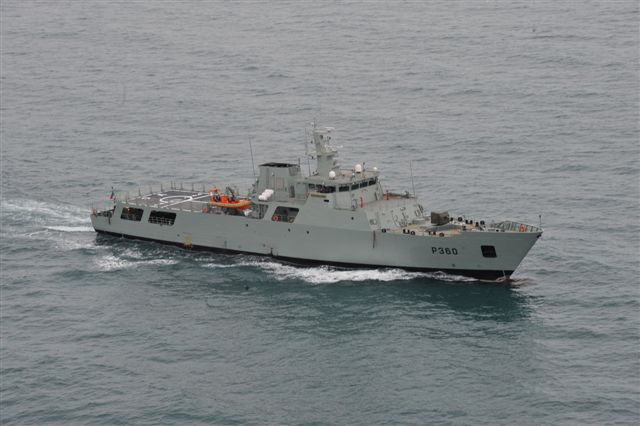
NRP Viana do Castelo, offshore patrol vessel of the Portuguese Navy

==== Portuguese Navy ====
- Viana do Castelo class
- Tejo-class
- Centauro-class
- Argos-class
- Rio Minho-class
- Cacine-class

==== Maritime Police ====
- Bolina-class
- Levante-class
- Tufão-class
- Calmaria-class

==== National Republican Guard ====
- Bojador-class
- Ribamar-class
- Zodíaco-class
- Mar Creta-class

=== Qatar ===
==== Qatari Emiri Navy ====
- Musherib class

==== Qatari Ministry of Interior ====
- ARES 75
- ARES 110
- ARES 150

=== Romania ===
- SNR-17 class patrol boats, Romanian Border Police
- Stefan Cel Mare patrol vessel, Romanian Border Police

=== Russia ===
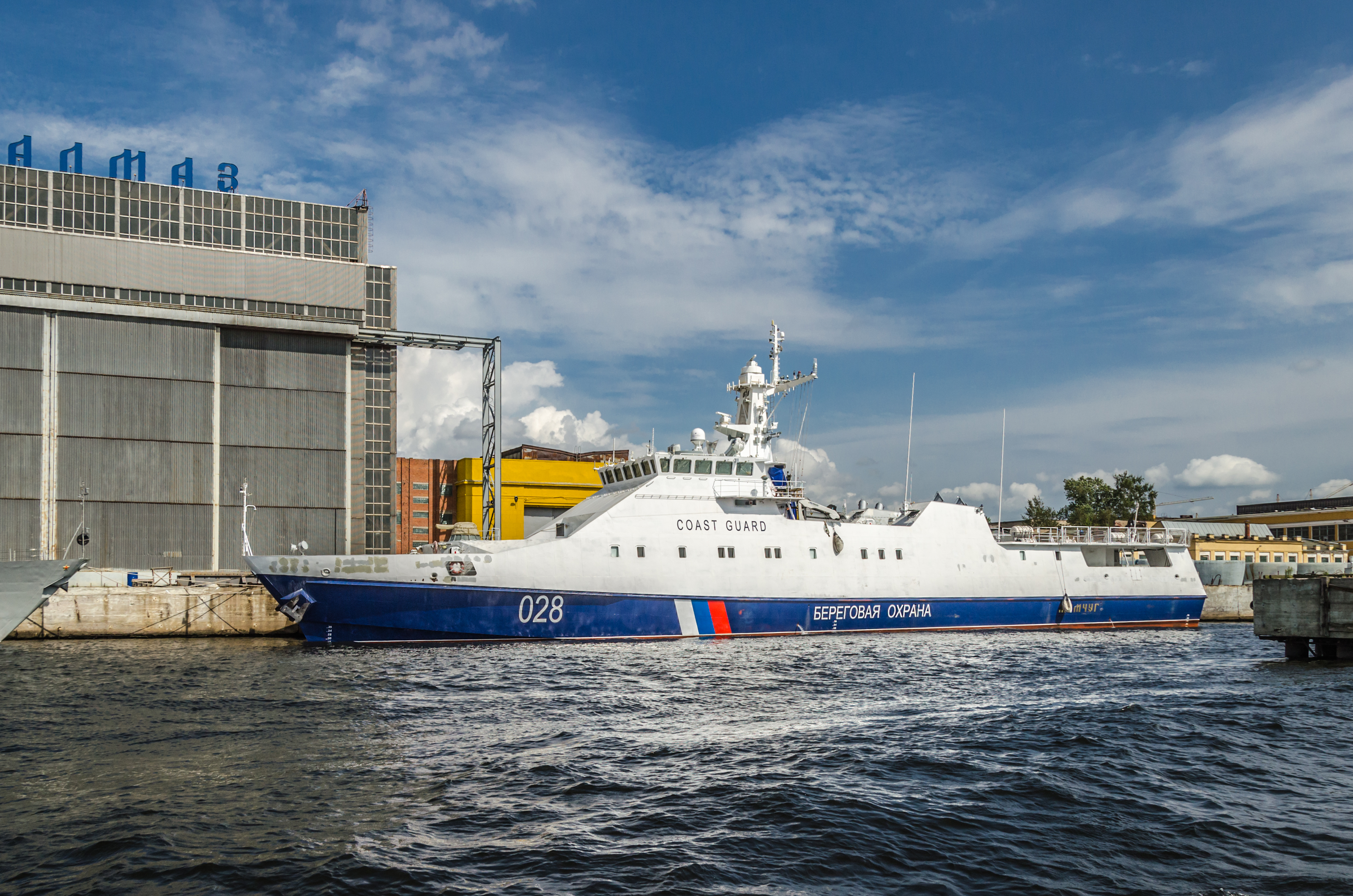
Russian Coast Guard Rubin class patrol boat Zhemchug on the Almaz Shipbuilding Company

- Stenka class patrol boat (Project 02059), Russian Navy and Russian Coast Guard
- Bogomol Class patrol boat (Project 02065), Russian Navy
- Mirage class patrol vessel (Project 14310), Russian Coast Guard
- Svetlyak class patrol boat (Project 10410), Russian Coast Guard
- Ogonek class patrol boat (Project 12130), Russian Coast Guard
- Mangust class patrol boat (Project 12150, Russian Coast Guard
- Sobol class patrol boat (Project 12200), Russian Coast Guard
- Terrier class patrol boat (Project 14170), Russian Navy and Russian Coast Guard
- Rubin class patrol boat (Project 22460), Russian Coast Guard
- Okean class patrol vessel (Project 22100), Russian Coast Guard
- Vosh class river patrol craft (Project 12481), Russian Coast Guard
- Piyavka class river patrol craft (Project 1249), Russian Coast Guard
- Ogonek class river patrol craft (Project 12130), Russian Coast Guard
- Project 22160 patrol ship, Russian Navy large patrol boat

=== Senegal ===
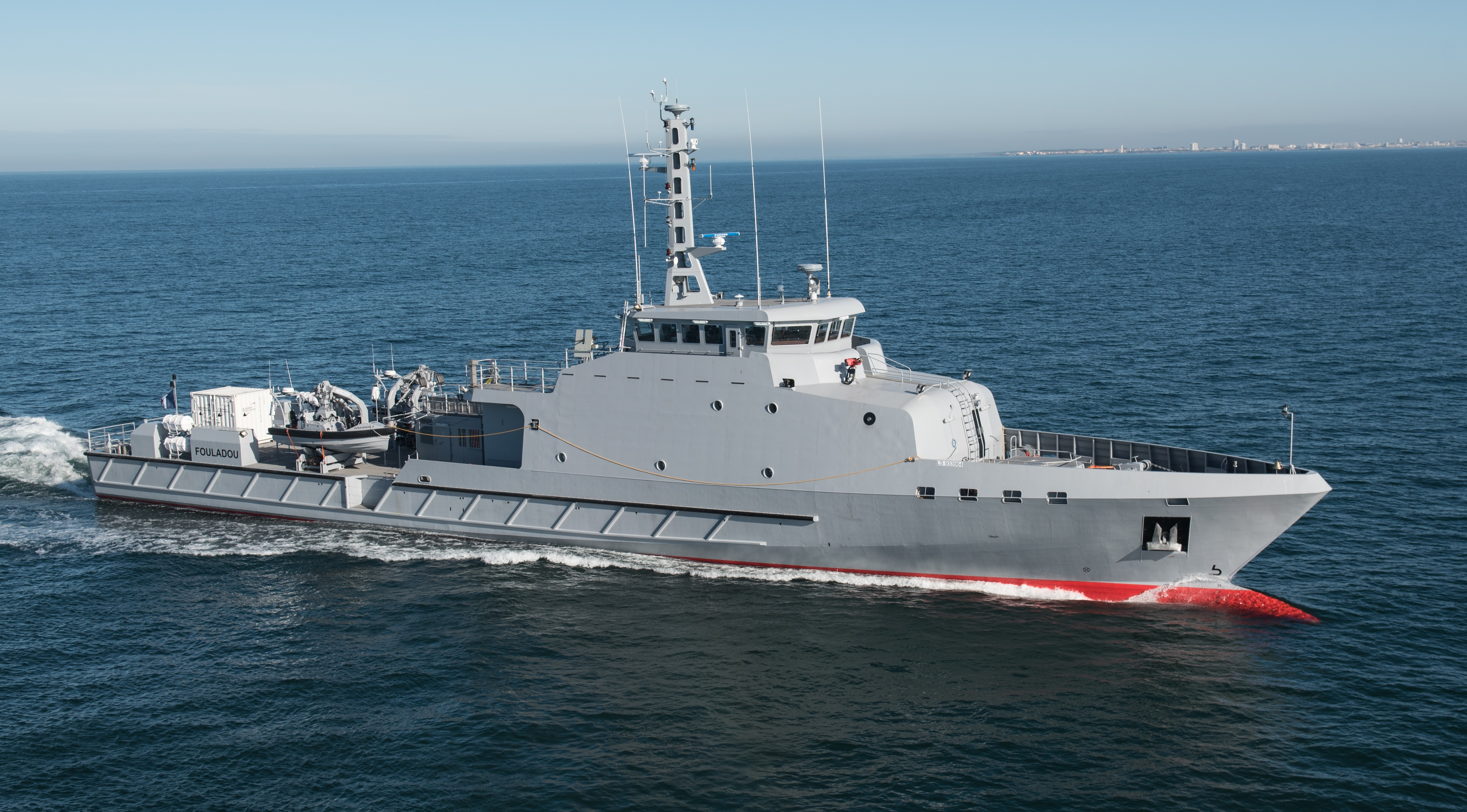
Fouladou, OPV 190 from Senegalese navy

- Fouladou (OPV 190), Senegalese Navy
- Kedougou (OPV 45), Senegalese Navy
- Ferlo (RPB 33), Senegalese Navy
- Conejera (Class Conejera P 31), Senegalese Navy
- Fouta (Osprey 55), Senegalese Navy
- Njambuur (PR 72), Senegalese Navy

=== Singapore ===
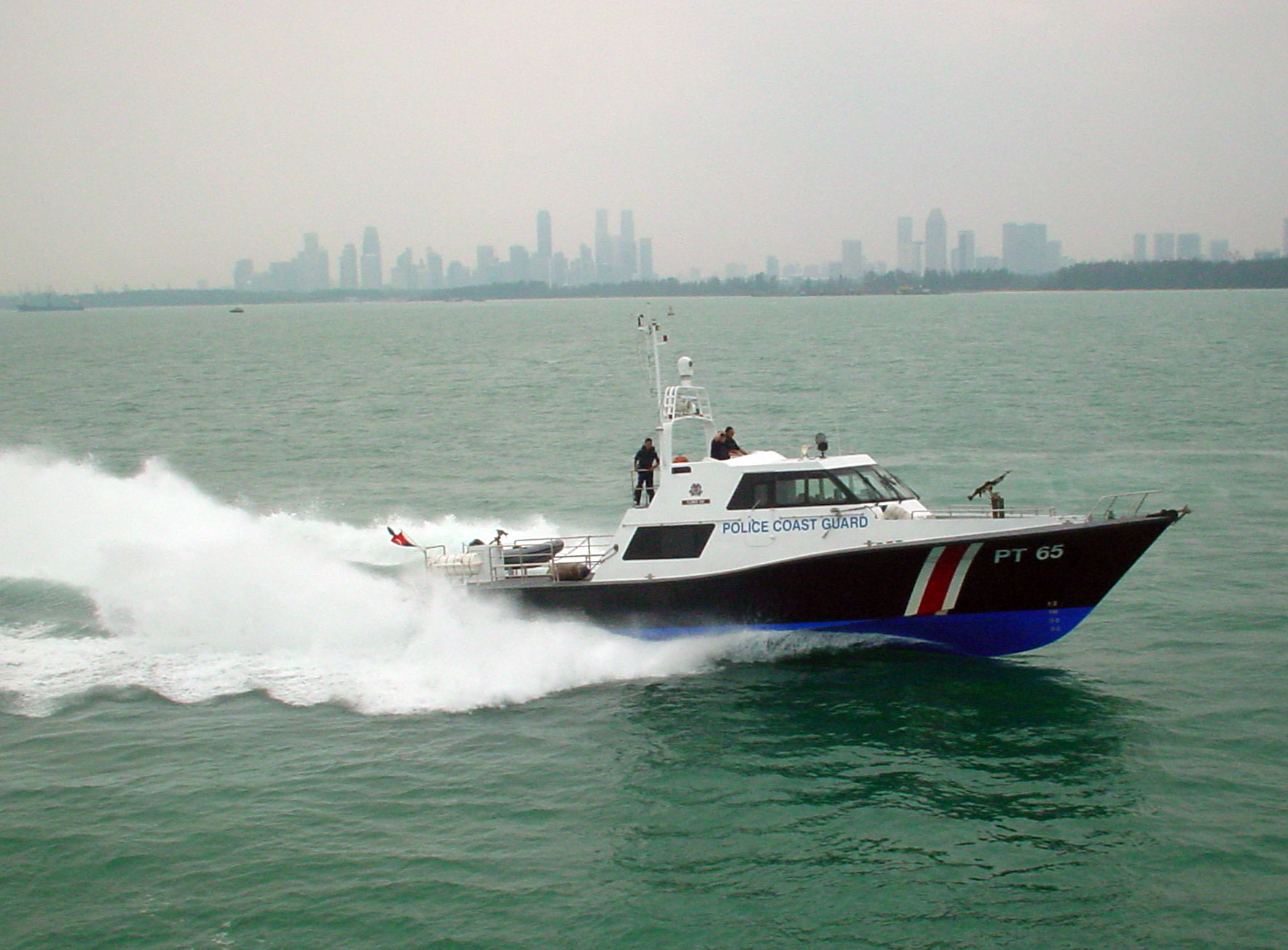
Police Coast Guard third generation PT Class Flower Ray (PT65) conducting a sea-rescue demonstration

- Fearless-class patrol vessel, Republic of Singapore Navy
- PK class Interceptor Craft, Police Coast Guard
- 1st Generation PT class patrol Craft, Police Coast Guard (decommissioned)
- 2nd Generation PT class patrol Craft, Police Coast Guard (decommissioned)
- 3rd Generation PT class patrol Craft, Police Coast Guard
- 4th Generation PT class patrol Craft, Police Coast Guard
- PC class patrol Craft, Police Coast Guard
- Swift-class coastal patrol craft (decommissioned in RSN service, active in Police Coast Guard)
- Independence-class littoral mission vessel, Republic of Singapore Navy
- Sentinel-class patrol vessel, Republic of Singapore Navy

=== Slovenia ===
- Slovenian patrol boat Triglav

=== South Africa ===
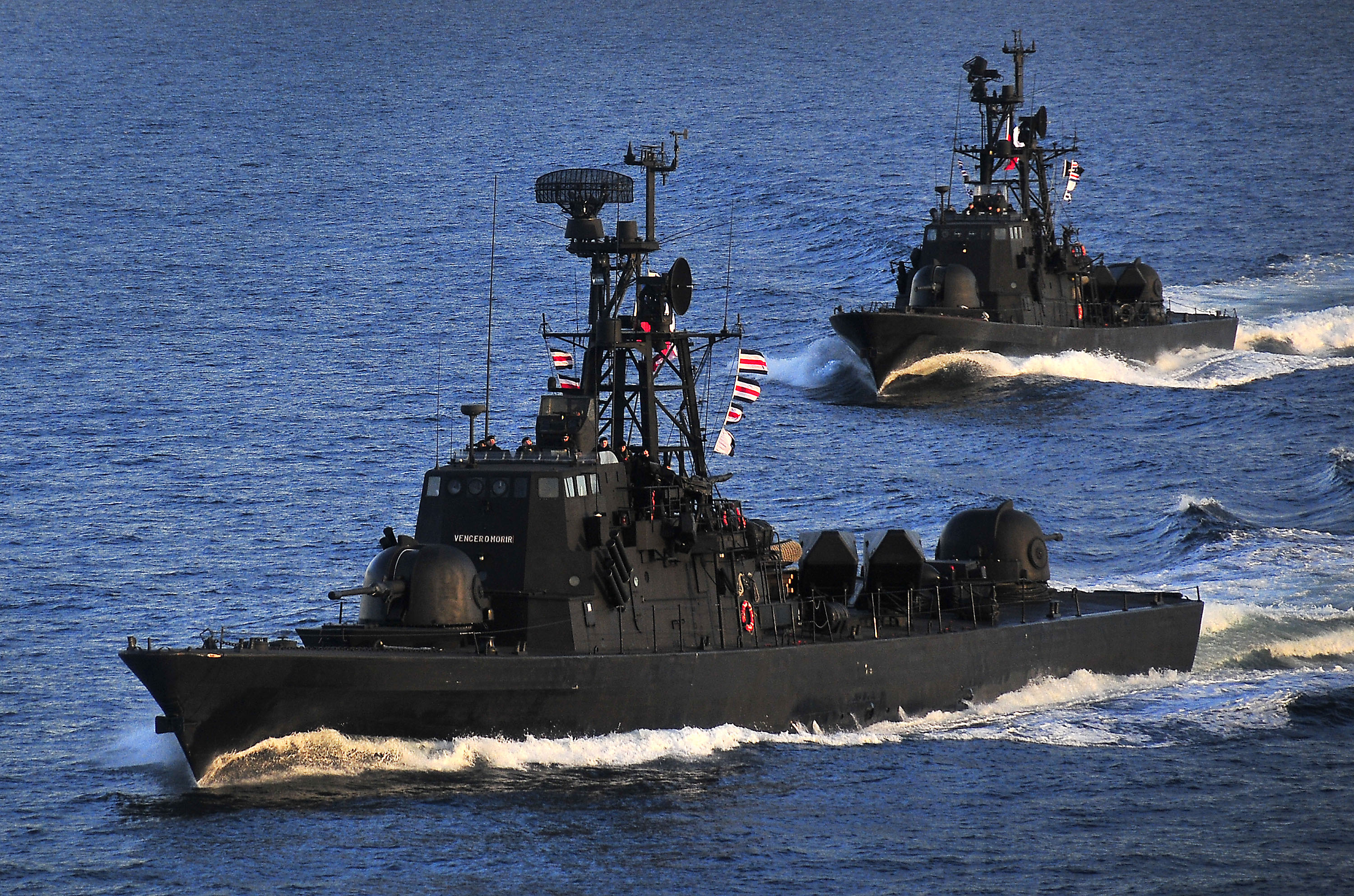
An Israeli Sa'ar 4-class missile boat, called the Warrior-class strike craft in the South African Navy

- Warrior class (modified Saar 4 Open Sea Patrol Vessels)
- Namacurra class

=== South Korea (ROK) ===
- Chamsuri-class (Republic of Korea Navy)
- Yoon Youngha-class patrol vessel

=== Spain ===
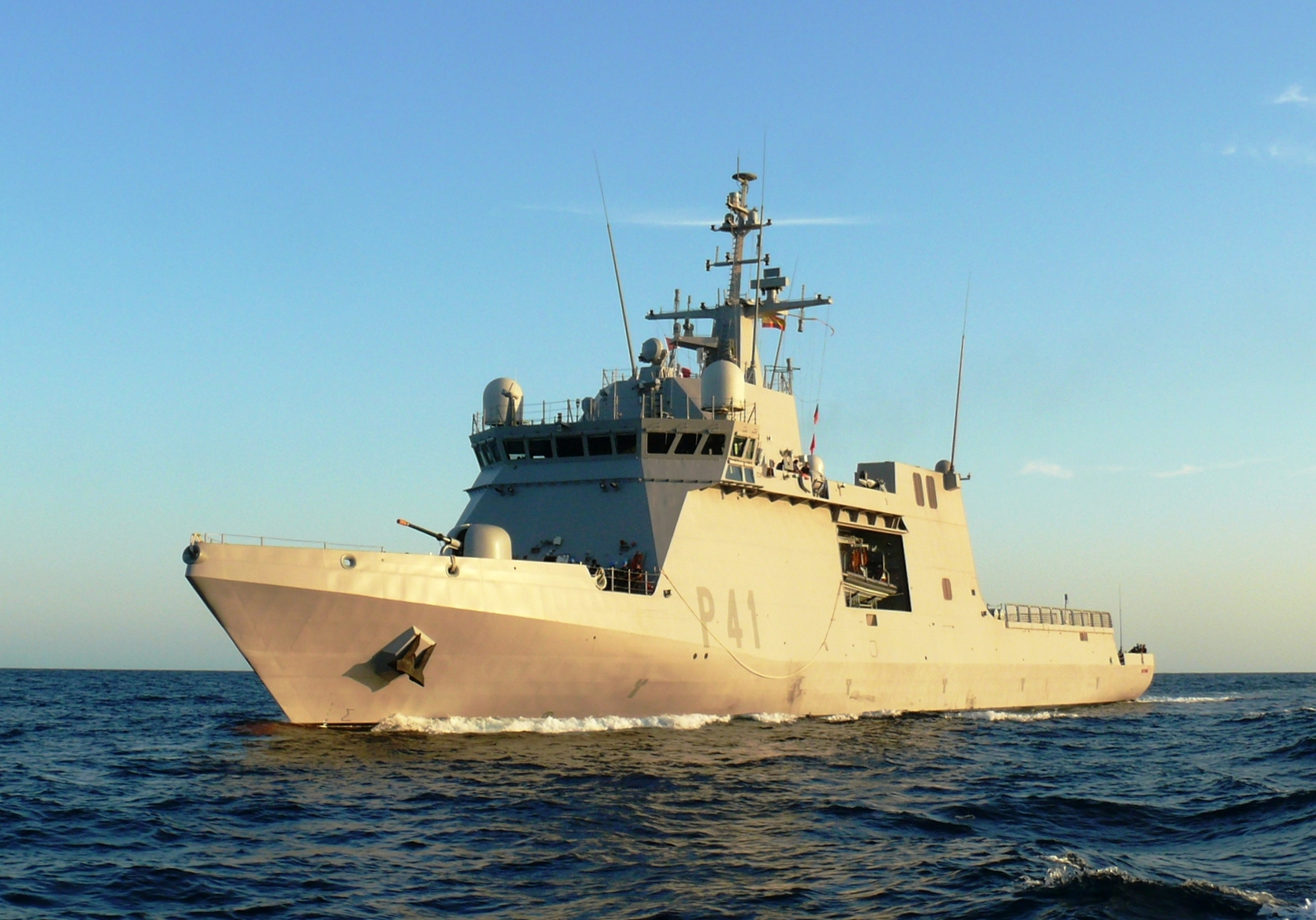
Meteoro (P-41)

- Meteoro class
- Descubierta class
- Serviola class
- Anaga class
- Barceló class
- Toralla class
- Conejera class
- Chilreu class
- P111 class patrol boat
- Cabo Fradera class

=== Sri Lanka ===
- Jayasagara class (Sri Lanka Navy)
- Colombo class (Sri Lanka Navy)

=== Suriname ===
- Ocea Type FPB 98 class fast patrol boat
- Ocea Type FPB 72 class fast patrol boat

=== Sweden ===
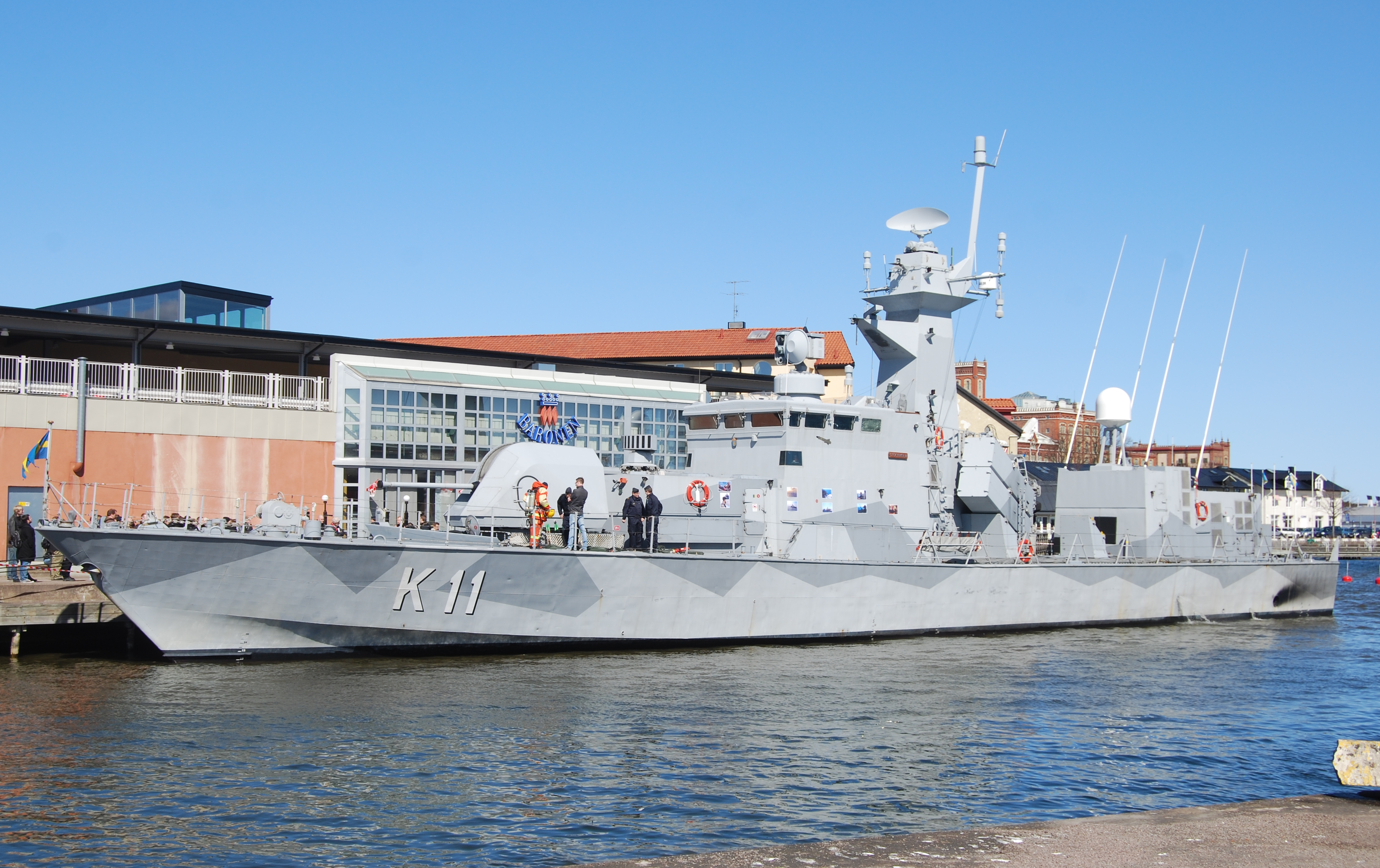
HSwMS Stockholm (PC-11), a Stockholm-class corvette with the Royal Swedish Navy

- Hugin-class (based on the Norwegian Storm-class, decommissioned) – 16 ships
- Kaparen-class (Hugin-class modified with better subhunting capacity, decommissioned) – 8 ships
- Stockholm-class (commissioned as corvettes, later converted to patrol boats) – 2 ships
- HMS Carlskrona (commissioned as minelayer, later converted to ocean patrol vessel)

Additionally, the Royal Swedish Navy also operates smaller types of patrol boats (Swedish: bevakningsbåt = "guard boat"):

- Typ 60-class (decommissioned) – 17 ships
- Tapper class – 12 ships

The Swedish Coast Guard operate an additional 22 patrol vessels for maritime surveillance.

=== Taiwan (Republic of China) ===
==== Republic of China Navy ====
- Ching Chiang-class
- Ching Chiang-class

==== Coast Guard Administration ====
- Anping-class offshore patrol vessel
- Chiayi-class offshore patrol vessel
- Miaoli-class patrol vessel
- Siraya-class offshore patrol vessel
- Yilan-class patrol vessel

=== Thailand ===
- Pattani class (Royal Thai Navy)
- River class (Royal Thai Navy)
- T.991 class (Royal Thai Navy)
- krabi class (Royal Thai Navy)

=== Trinidad and Tobago ===
==== Trinidad and Tobago Coast Guard ====
- Damen Stan Patrol 5009

=== Turkey ===
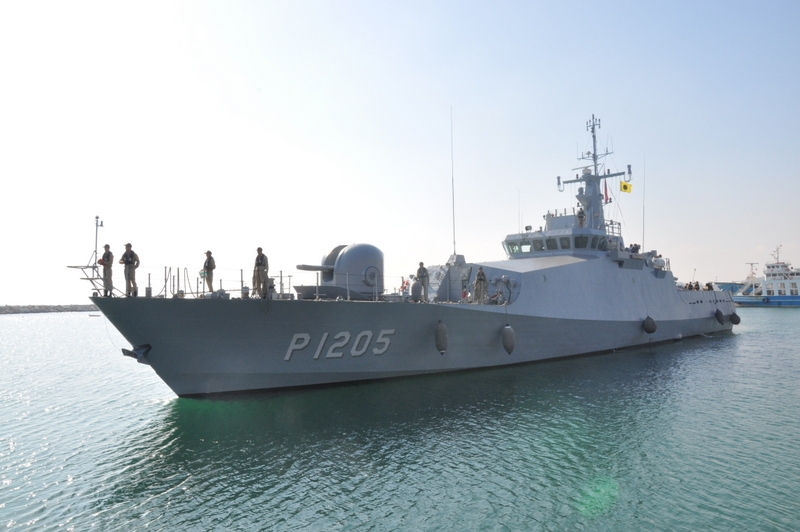
Turkish TCG Karabiga (P-1205), one of the Tuzla-class patrol boats

==== Turkish Naval Forces ====
- Kılıç II class
- Kılıç I class
- Yıldız class
- Rüzgar class
- Doğan class
- Kartal class
- Türk class
- Tuzla class
- Hisar class

==== Coast Guard Command ====
- KAAN 15 class
- KAAN 19 class
- KAAN 29 class
- KAAN 33 class
- SAR 33 class
- SAR 35 class
- 80 class
- Corvette

=== United Kingdom ===
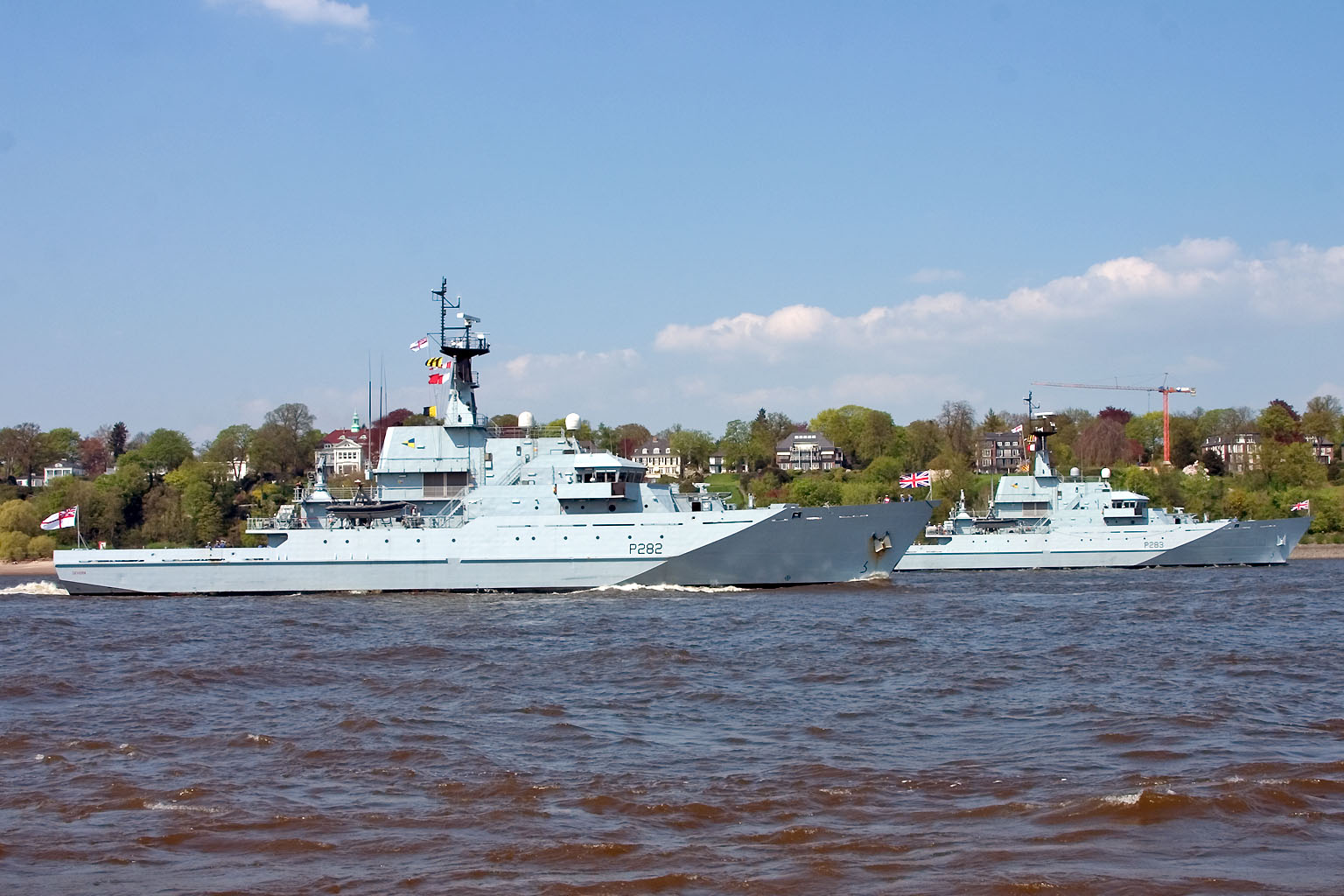
Two River class offshore patrol vessels of the Royal Navy

- Kingfisher-class patrol vessel of 1935
- Motor Launch of World War II
- Harbour Defence Motor Launch of World War II
- Bird class patrol vessel
- Ford-class seaward defence boat
- River class patrol vessel
- Castle class patrol vessel
- Archer class patrol vessel
- Island class patrol vessel
- Scimitar class patrol vessel
- UKBF 42m Customs Cutter
- Cutlass-class patrol vessel with the Gibraltar Squadron from 2022

=== United States ===
==== United States Navy ====
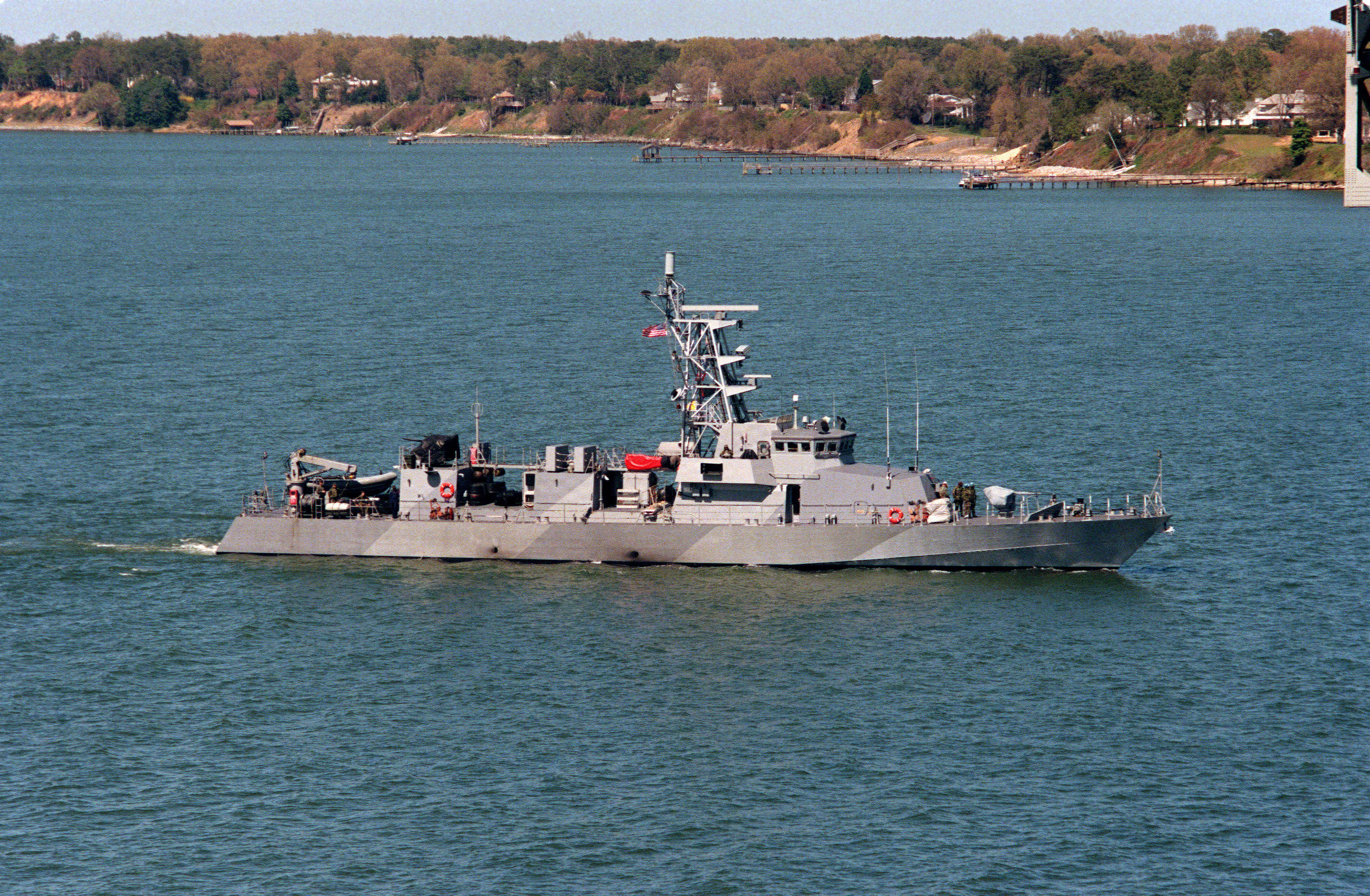
USS Firebolt (PC-10), a United States Navy Cyclone-class patrol ship

- Combatant Craft Medium - (2015–present)
- Cyclone-class patrol ship - (1993–2022)
- Mark VI patrol boat - US Navy (2016–present)

==== United States Coast Guard ====
- Cyclone-class patrol ship - (2000–2011) - four boats were transferred to the Coast Guard for a temporary loan, three (2004–2011) have since been returned, while the fourth (2000–2004) was donated to the Philippine Navy
- Marine Protector-class patrol boat – (1998–present)
- Island-class patrol boat – (1985–present)
- Sentinel-class cutter – (2012–present)

=== Venezuela ===
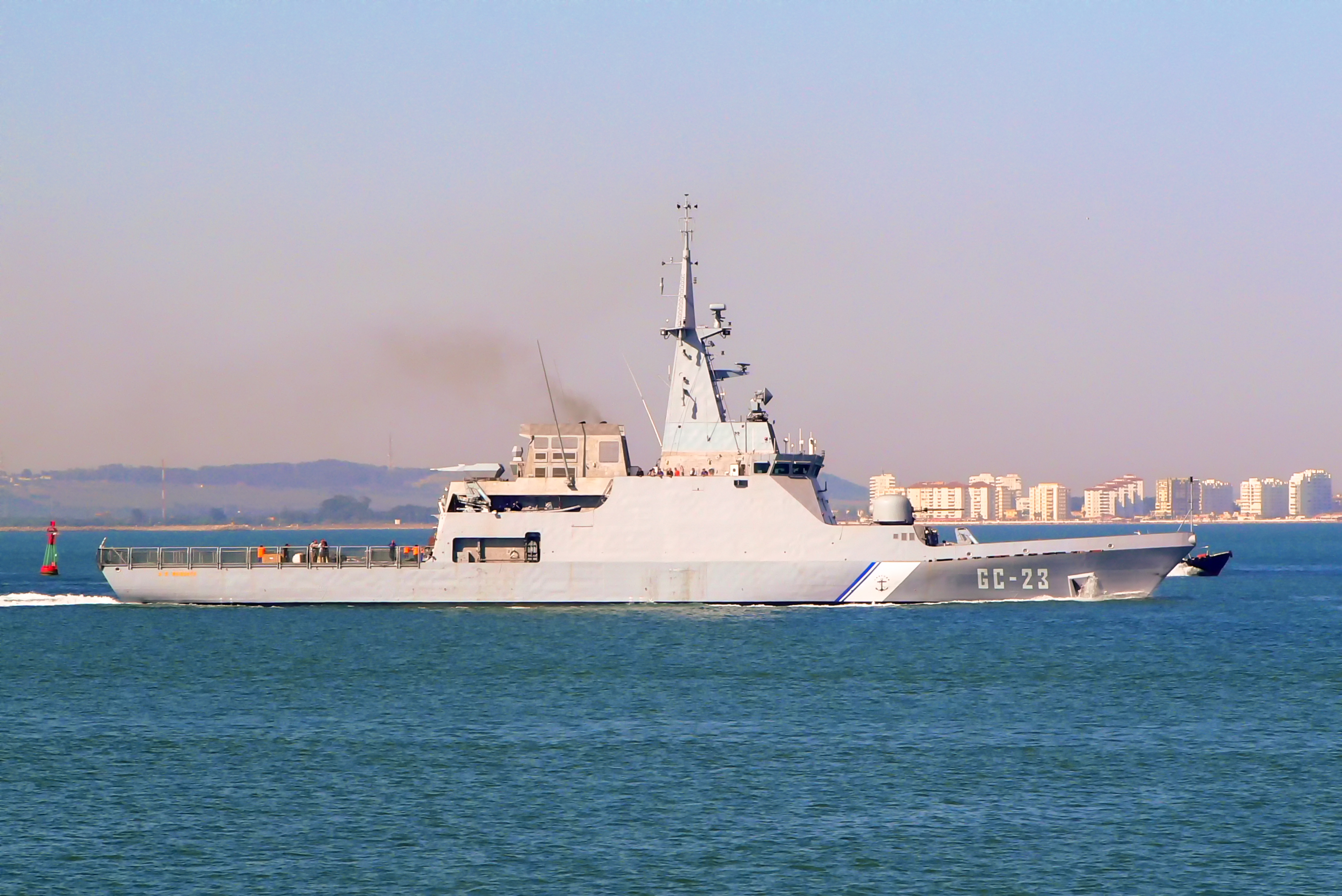
Naiguatá during sea trials

- Venezuelan patrol boat Naiguatá (GC-23)

=== Vietnam ===
- Type TT-120 patrol boat, Vietnam Coast Guard
- Type TT-200 patrol boat, Vietnam Coast Guard
- Type TT-400 patrol boat, Vietnam Coast Guard
- DN 2000(Damen 9014 class) offshore patrol vessels, Vietnam Coast Guard
