= List of naval ship classes of Iran =

This is a list of naval ship classes that were in service with the Imperial Iranian Navy, or are still in service with the Islamic Republic of Iran Navy or the Navy of the Islamic Revolutionary Guard Corps. Some projects, that were not built or future designs are also present.

== List of classes ==
=== Principal surface combatants ===
==== Drone Carriers ====
- IRIS Shahid Bagheri

==== Light Carriers/Q-ships ====
- IRIS Shahid Mahdavi
- IRIS Shahid Roudaki

==== Destroyers ====
- Battle class (decommissioned)
- Allen M. Sumner class (decommissioned)
- Kidd class (cancelled)
- Khalije Fars class (under construction)
- Negin class (planned)

==== Corvettes ====
- Bayandor class
- Hamzeh class

==== Frigates ====
- Alvand class
- Moudge class
- Loch class (decommissioned)
- Algerine class (decommissioned)
- Kortenaer class (cancelled)

=== Submarines ===
==== Attack submarines ====
- Kilo class
- Tang class (cancelled)
- Type 209 (cancelled)
- Besat class (planned)

==== Coastal submarines ====
- Fateh class

==== Midget submarines ====
- Ghadir class
- Nahang class

=== Patrol vessels ===
==== Fast attack craft ====
- Kaman class
- Sina class
- Tondar class

==== Patrol crafts ====
- Ghaem class
- Parvin class
- Kaivan class
- Hendijan class
- Heidar class
- Zafar class
- Mk I class
- Mk II class
- HDML class (decommissioned)
- Azar class (decommissioned)
- Gohar class (decommissioned)

==== Fast missile boats ====
- Azarakhsh class
- Peykaap II class
- Peykaap III class
- MK13 class

==== Fast torpedo boats ====
- Peykaap I class
- Kajami class
- Gahjae class
- Tarlan class

==== Fast patrol boats ====
- Ashura class
- Taregh class
- RIB class
- Cougar class
- Seraj class
- Kashdom class
- MIL 40 class
- MIL 55 class
- Murce class
- Tir class
- Pashe class

=== Amphibious vessels ===
- Hengam class
- Karbala class
- BH.7 class
- SR.N6 class
- Hormoz 21 class
- Hormoz 24 class
- Iran Ajr class

=== Auxiliary vessels ===
- Kangan class
- Ol class
- Bandar Abbas class
- Delvar class
- Nasser class
- Amphion class (decommissioned)
- Achelous class (decommissioned)
- ARD-12 class

=== Mine warfare vessels ===
- Adjutant class
- Cove class (decommissioned)
- Saba class

=== Other vessels ===
==== Swimmer delivery vehicle ====
- Al-Sabehat

==== Wing-in-ground effect air vehicle ====
- Bavar 2

=== High-aspect-ratio twin-hull vessels ===
- IRIS Shahid Nazeri
- Shahid Soleimani class

== See also ==
- List of former Iranian naval vessels
- List of current ships of the Islamic Republic of Iran Navy
- List of equipment of the Navy of the Islamic Revolutionary Guard Corps
