= IRIS Shahid Bagheri =

Iranian drone carrier ship

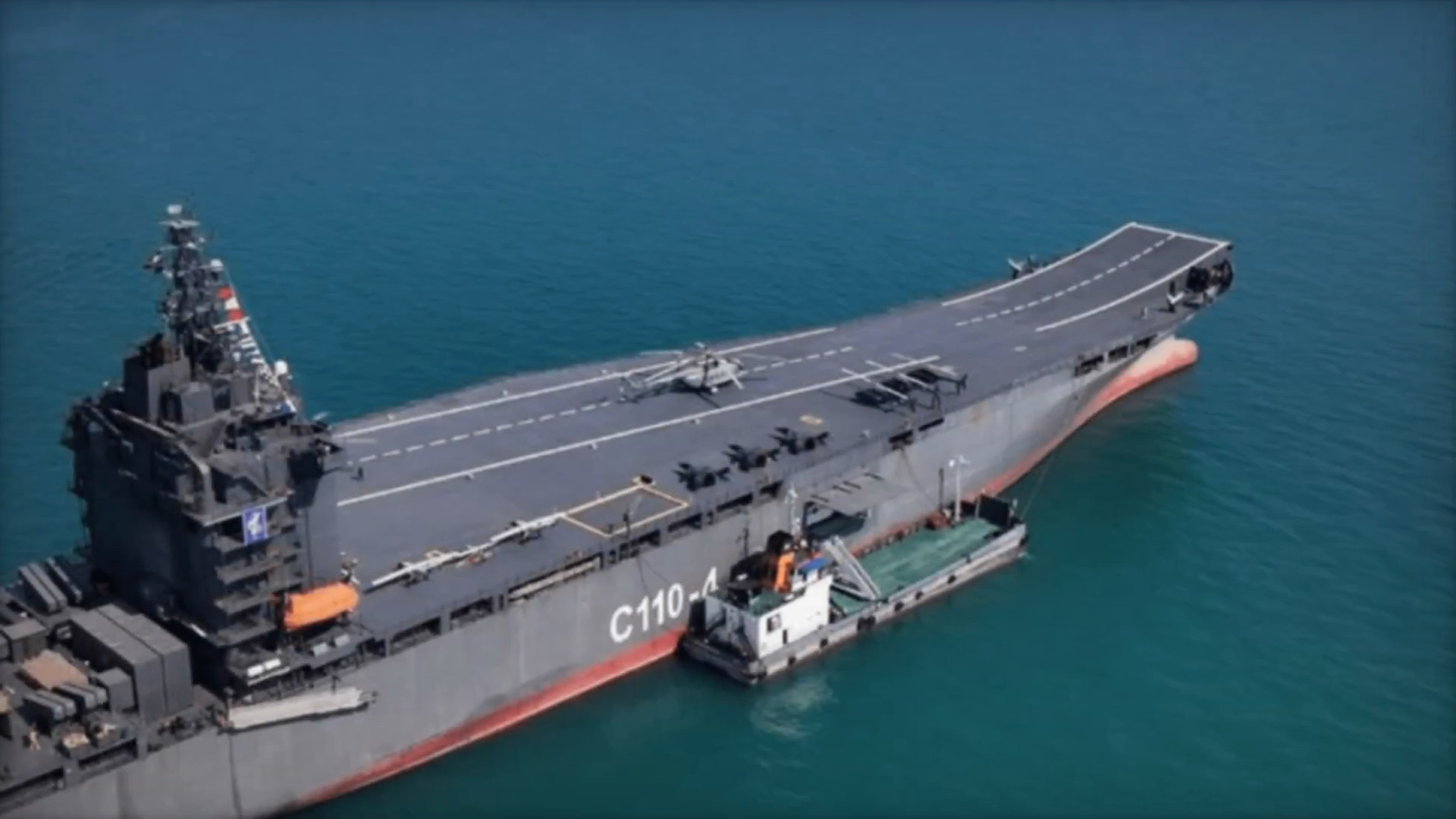
- IRIS Shahid Bagheri in 2025

History

Iran
- Name: Shahid Bagheri
- Namesake: Bahman Bagheri
- Operator: Islamic Revolutionary Guards Corps Navy
- Builder: HD Hyundai Heavy Industries, South Korea
- Completed: 2000
- Commissioned: 6 February 2025
- Out of service: February 2026
- Refit: 2022–2024
- Home port: Bandar Abbas
- Identification: Pennant number: C110-4
- Status: Sunk during the 2026 Iran war

General characteristics
- Class & type: Drone carrier
- Displacement: 41,978 t (41,315 long tons)
- Length: 240.79 m (790 ft 0 in)
- Beam: 32.2 m (105 ft 8 in)
- Draft: 11.7 m (38 ft 5 in)
- Installed power: 20,000 kW (27,000 hp)
- Speed: 22 kn (41 km/h; 25 mph)
- Endurance: 1,000 days
- Armament: 1 × 30 mm autocannon; 8 × Noor or Qader anti-ship missiles; 8 × Kowsar-222 SAMs
- Aircraft carried: Able to carry different types of helicopters (e.g. Bell-412) and UAVs (e.g. JAS-313)
- Aviation facilities: Helicopter landing deck

IRIS Shahid Bagheri (also IRIS Shahid Bahman Bagheri; Persian: شهید باقری) is a drone carrier operated by the Islamic Revolutionary Guards Corps Navy. It is the result of the 2022–2024 conversion of the container ship Perarin, to which was added an angled flight deck with a ski-jump, in the manner of light aircraft carriers. It is named after Bahman Bagheri, an IRGC commander who was killed in action in Pathak, Iraq, during the Iran–Iraq War.

The ship was the first full-service UAV carrier of the IRGC Navy. It was launched at sea for the first sea trials from her home port of Bandar Abbas sometime around 28 November 2024. Her launch underscored Tehran's efforts to project its power overseas, far beyond nearby waters. It was commissioned on 6 February 2025.

On 2 March 2026, the United States Central Command announced that the ship had been struck by U.S. forces amidst the 2026 Iran war.

== History ==
Shahid Bagheri (C-110-4) was previously the container ship Perarin (IMO number: 9209350) from South Korea. The conversion was first spotted on 3 January 2023 in an Iranian dockyard. The most notable feature was an angled flight deck being constructed. On 21 August 2024, the first clear images of the aircraft carrier were posted on Telegram and then to Twitter.

These posts quickly went viral with many different defense experts comparing the design to HMS Furious. The carrier became viral once again because of reports of Iranian drones off the coast of New Jersey.

Representative Jeff Van Drew, a member of the United States Congress' House of Representatives Judiciary Committee, claimed that Iran was operating a drone mother ship off the coast of New Jersey. The same day, multiple images of Shadid Bagheri off the coast of Iran were revealed, proving that the carrier was still busy with sea trials.

=== Operational history ===
Sea trials for Shahid Bagheri began on 13 November 2024 leaving Iran Shipbuilding & Offshore Industries Complex, just west of the southern port city of Bandar Abbas. The full reveal of the ship took place on 6 February 2025, showing a full flight deck of Ababil-3N carrier drones, new stealth drones called the JAS-313, Bell 206 helicopters, Mi-171 helicopters, Homa VTOL drones and a Mohajer-6 drone. A fully working hospital was revealed as well. The carrier has a fully functioning soccer field.

The carrier has the ability to deploy over 30 fast attack craft from inside the ship. This would be the first fixed-wing drone carrier ever made specifically for drones. Footage broadcast by Iranian state TV on the inauguration showed at least four helicopters and three drones on the warship's flight deck.

Chief of the IRGC, General Hossein Salami, said at the ceremony that the warship can travel "independently" at sea for up to one year. The report said the ship also has a hospital and facilities such as a gym for its crew. According to limited open-source information, the carrier is capable of deploying various types of small unmanned aerial vehicles and air defense missiles. It is reportedly equipped with short- and medium-range air defense systems, intelligence-gathering equipment, and a flight control tower. In addition to featuring ESM and SIGINT capabilities, Admiral Tangsiri stated at the ceremony that the carrier can also deploy and operate "guided subsurface vessels."

==== 2026 Iran War ====
On 2 March 2026, the United States Central Command announced that the ship had been struck by U.S. forces amidst the 2026 Iran war.

== Specifications and capabilities ==
According to Alireza Tangsiri, Commander of the Islamic Revolutionary Guard Corps Navy, the vessel, with seaworthiness up to Force 9 (oceans) and an operational range of 22,000 nautical miles (41,000 km; 25,000 mi) (offshore), enables presence and operations for a year without the need for refueling in distant waters.

With a 180-meter-long runway for drones, the vessel can travel up to 22,000 nautical miles without needing to refuel in ports. The report said it was converted from a commercial ship and would increase Iran’s power of deterrence. The ship is also equipped with eight cruise anti-ship missiles, eight multipurpose Kowsar-222 missiles, a turret with a 30 mm automatic cannon, two 20 mm Gatling-type cannons (unconfirmed) and two RC turrets with 20 mm Gatling-type cannons.

Shahid Bagheri was built in two years and is equipped with a drone fueling station, a floatplane, and helicopters, as well as short- and medium-range air defense systems, intelligence equipment, and a flight control tower. Additional features include the capability to carry and operate various types of drones and guided subsurface vessels, the ability to identify different types of electronic signals for electronic warfare and full SIGINT, long-range surface-to-surface cannons and weapons, long-range surface-to-surface cruise missiles, and the capacity to engage various types of small aircraft and air defense missiles. It is also equipped with a runway that is 180 metres (590 ft 7 in) long.

== See also ==
- IRIS Shahid Roudaki
- IRIS Shahid Mahdavi
