= Iranian naval rigid inflatable speedboats =

Iranian speedboats

Various series of rigid inflatable boat (RIB) are operated by naval forces of Iran. Based on a design by Italian Fabio Buzzi, they have been manufactured and modified in Iran.

== History ==
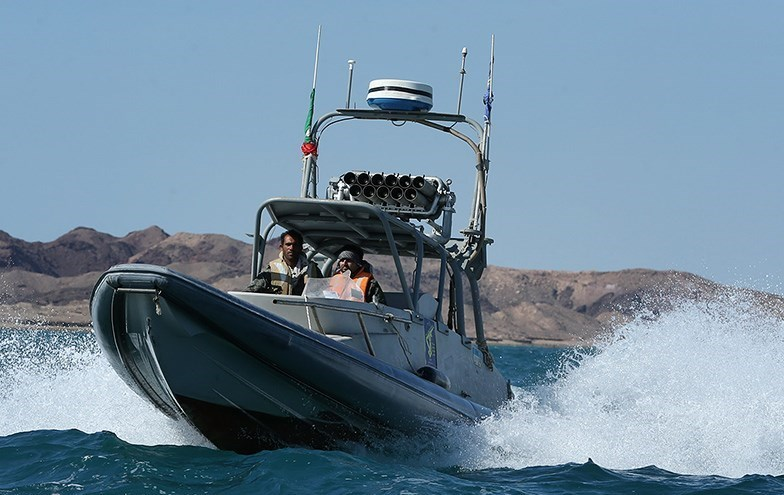
RIB 33 of the Navy of the Islamic Revolutionary Guard Corps

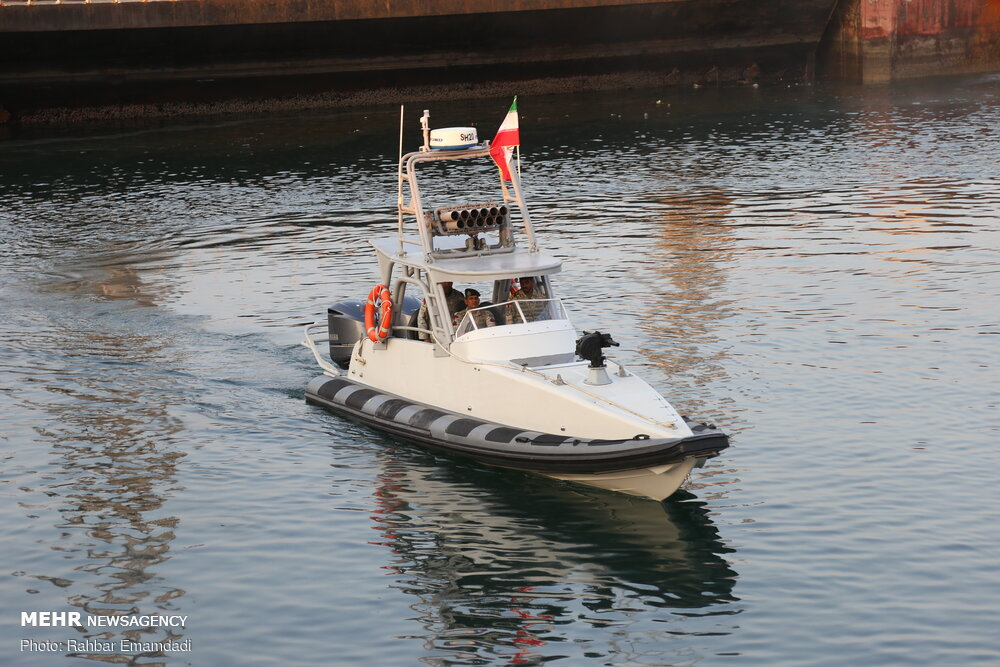
RIB 42 of the Islamic Republic of Iran Navy

The cooperation between FB Design and Iranians started in 1998, when frames and blueprints of patrol boat Levriero was purchased by Iran. It is likely that Shahid Joulaee Marine Industries (subordinate to Marine Industries Organization) obtained a license to produce RIB-33SC and FB-55SC models domestically. In 2005, American authorities questioned FB Design about their deals with Iran, effectively putting an end to the cooperation. Iran has reportedly altered some original designs and manufactured similar modifications.

== Types ==
According to 2015 edition of Jane's Fighting Ships, Iran is known to operate the following models and modifications of rigid inflatable boat:

- RIB 42SC (13 m (42 ft 8 in) long, at least one in service)
- FB 55 (16.5 m (54 ft 2 in) long, at least one in service)
- FB 38 (12 m (39 ft 4 in) long, at least two in service)
- RIB 36 (11 m (36 ft 1 in) long, at least two in service)
- RIB 55SC (16.7 m (54 ft 9 in) long, at least two in service)

The estimates for top speed of these vessels range between 60 knots (110 km/h) to 70 knots (130 km/h). In addition to versions mentioned above, RIB 33 is in service in unknown numbers.

According to H.I. Sutton, the Navy of the Islamic Revolutionary Guard Corps commissioned 32 RIBs into service in June 2020, some equipped with rocket launchers and the rest armed with machine guns. The vessels are used by the S.N.S.F., marines of the naval forces, likely for boarding operations.

== See also ==
- MIL 40 class, Iranian speedboat based on designs from FB Design
- MIL 55 class, Iranian speedboat based on designs from FB Design
- Iranian high-aspect-ratio twin-hull vessels
