= IRIS Shahid Mahdavi =

Iranian warship

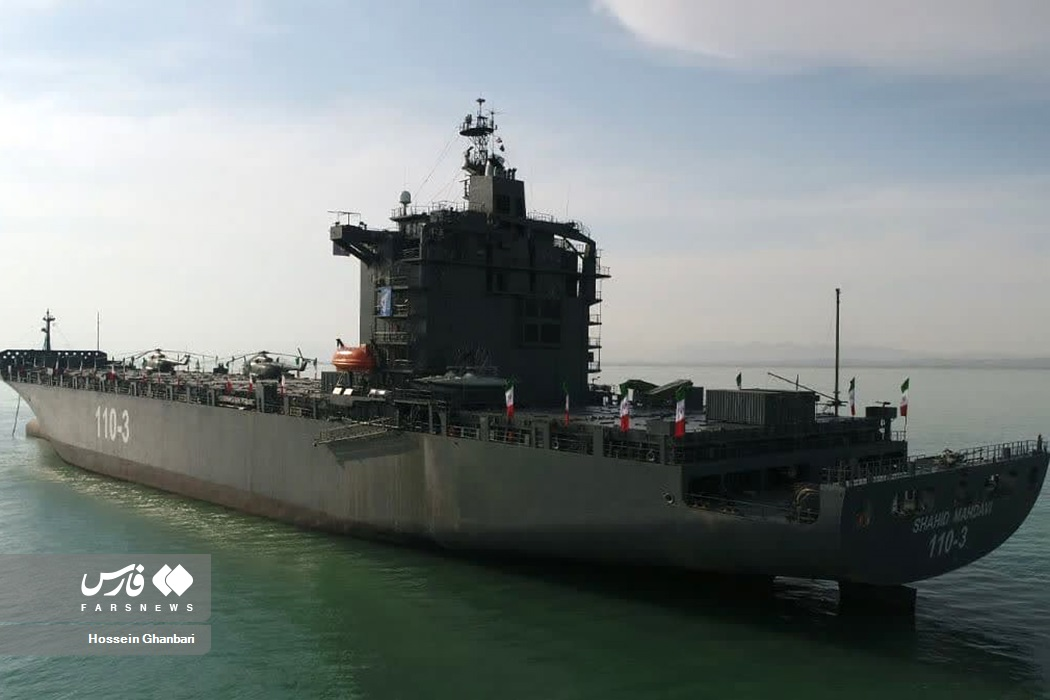

History

Iran
- Name: Shahid Mahdavi
- Namesake: Nader Mahdavi
- Operator: Navy of the Islamic Revolutionary Guard Corps
- Builder: HD Hyundai Heavy Industries Co., Ltd., South Korea
- Commissioned: 2000
- Recommissioned: March 2023
- In service: 2023–2026
- Out of service: 2026
- Home port: Bandar Abbas
- Identification: Pennant number: L110–3; Code letters:
- Fate: Sunk during the 2026 Iran war

General characteristics
- Displacement: 36,000 t (35,000 long tons)
- Length: 240 m (787 ft 5 in)
- Beam: 27 m (88 ft 7 in)
- Speed: 33 km/h (21 mph)
- Range: 33,000 km (21,000 mi)
- Complement: 50
- Sensors & processing systems: 3D phased array radar, EW suite
- Armament: 4 × Nawab air defense missiles, anti-aircraft gun systems, Qadr-474 cruise missiles, Zolfaghar anti-ship ballistic missiles
- Aircraft carried: Able to carry different types of helicopters (e.g. Mi 17, Bell-412) and different types of drones.
- Aviation facilities: Helicopter landing deck
- Notes: Could carry Zulfikar submersible torpedo boats

IRIS Shahid Mahdavi was a warship operated by the Navy of the Islamic Revolutionary Guard Corps of Iran that was capable of carrying helicopters, drones, and missile launchers. Shahid Mahdavi, originally a Panamax container ship, built by South Korea, was the largest ship operated by IRGC Navy until the commissioning of IRIS Shahid Bagheri.

She was three times the size of Shahid Roudaki (12,000 tons), the other Expeditionary Sea Base operated by IRGC Navy. The ship was launched in line with the stated aim of IRGC Navy to create an asymmetrical military strategy to disrupt the established order.

She was destroyed by United States forces during the 2026 Iran war.

== History ==
Shahid Mahdavi was used for long-range deployments by IRGC Navy. The biggest advantage of this ship is her 150-metre flat deck. The ship was commissioned into service in March 2023 in the presence of IRGC Navy Commander Rear Admiral Alireza Tangsiri.

In line with the naming convention of the IRGC, the ship was named after a martyr. Shahid Mahdavi or Martyr Mahdavi was named after Nader Mahdavi, an Iranian guardsman killed by the U.S. Navy in 1987 during the Tanker War.

The Shahid Mahdavi was deployed for the first time off Gulf of Aden in May 2023. In February 2024, the ship was used to launch two Zolfaghar or Dezful anti-ship ballistic missiles. The ship crossed the Equator for the first time in its latest deployment. The ship was converted from a container ship, formerly known as Sarvin into warship at the ISOICO Shipyard.

In January 2026, the Shahid Mahdavi was present at the BRICS "Will for Peace" joint naval exercise at Simon's Town in South Africa.

Shahid Mahdavi was sunk in the Gulf of Oman during the 2026 Iran war.

== Description ==
Shahid Mahdavi has been described as a 'Q-ship'. Q-ships are commercial ships that were outfitted with weapons, allowing them to ambush weaker ships or submarines during the World Wars. The multipurpose warship was designed specifically for long-range operations and was equipped with missiles, air defense systems, and an advanced radar.

In 2025 a manipulated image was offered via Iranian agency "Salam Pix", showing a top-down view of Shahid Mahdavi with several helicopters parked and several silhouettes of fighter jets painted on it`s deck. The fake image was distributed to French "Abaca Press" and British Alamy, and was republished by various news outlets during the 2026 Iran war.
