= Peykaap =

Peykaap can refer to the following ship classes

- Peykaap I-class torpedo boat, a torpedo boat class of the Navy of the Islamic Revolutionary Guard Corps
- Peykaap II-class missile boat, a missile boat class of the Navy of the Islamic Revolutionary Guard Corps
- Peykaap III-class missile boat, a missile boat class of the Navy of the Islamic Revolutionary Guard Corps
