= Gahjae-class torpedo boat =

Type of submarine

Class overview
- Operators: Navy of the Islamic Revolutionary Guard Corps
- In service: 2002–present

General characteristics
- Type: Torpedo boat
- Displacement: 7 tons (estimate)
- Length: 15 m (49 ft 3 in) (speculative)
- Beam: 3 m (9 ft 10 in) (speculative)
- Draught: 0.7 m (2 ft 4 in) (speculative)
- Speed: 50 knots (93 km/h) (estimate)
- Armament: 2 × torpedo tubes

Gahjae is a class of semi-submersible fast torpedo boat operated by the Navy of the Islamic Revolutionary Guard Corps of Iran.

== History ==
Allegedly originating from the North Korea as Taedong-C, there are reports suggesting that three boats of this class were delivered to Iran on 22 December 2002.

== Design ==
Gahjae vessels are estimated to have a standard displacement of 7 t (6.9 long tons) and can possibly reach a top speed of 50 knots (93 km/h). The appearance of these vessels, resembles those of Peykaap-class and they should be close in terms of dimension. The vessels can carry two lightweight torpedoes of unknown type.

According to Jane's Fighting Ships, the vessel is likely designed for a high-speed approach towards enemy on the surface, and then submerging for almost 3 m (9.8 ft) before using the snort mast for an attack, like Kajami-class.
