= Great Prophet IX =

2015 Iranian military exercise

The Great Prophet IX (Persian: پیامبر اعظم 9, romanized: Payambar-e-Azam 9) was an Iranian war games exercise in the general area of the Strait of Hormuz on Larak Island, Persian Gulf. It started on February 25, 2015, and finished on February 27, 2015. The exercise was notable for using a full scale mock-up of an American aircraft carrier as a target.

== Exercise description ==
The exercise was conducted by Iran's Islamic Revolutionary Guard Corps (IRGC) and began by an order from Major General Mohammad Ali Jafari, chief commander of Iranian Revolutionary Guards, with different naval units of IRGC On February 25, 2015. The ceremony kicking off the maneuver included Iranian senior officials including Major General Mohammad Ali Jafari, the IRGC chief commander; Brigadier General Amir Ali Hajizadeh, the IRGC Aerospace Force commander; Ali Fadavi, the IRGC Navy commander; Mohammad Pakpour, the IRGC land forces commander; Brigadier General Hossein Salami, IRGC's second-in-command; plus Parliament Speaker Ali Larijani and film director Ebrahim Hatamikia attended to kicking off the maneuver ceremony. The Great Prophet IX war games goal was to show IRGC's missile and rocket-armed speedboats combat power to transregional powers as well as to enhance the defense capabilities of IRGC's operating units and test modern military tactics and equipment.

The exercise practiced an attack against an enemy's aircraft carrier, the first time such an attack was practiced in an Iranian war game. This included an attack on a 1:1 replica of a Nimitz-class aircraft carrier, which was made completely of metal and designed to not get sunk after being hit by rockets fired from Navy of the Army of the Guardians of the Islamic Revolution (IRGCN) rocket-armed speedboats. After getting hits from speedboats, Sepah Navy Special Force (SNSF) Takavar members boarded it, firing at simulated enemies, then clearing it, finally leaving it abandoned.

== Media reaction ==
The building of the mock-up aircraft carrier before the war game was announced sparked media frenzy in the US and Israel, which noticed its construction through satellite images and were unaware of Iranians' agenda. It was labeled as a "symbol of mistrust" by a CNN article and "black propaganda" by Israeli-based Ynet, speculated by analysts that it is being built "for propaganda purposes", and was described to be part of "military deception tactics", as a movie prop, or for training purposes. A US official, while admitting that he doesn't know the purpose of its construction, said the Iranians are "up to no good", while a US-based analyst said that the "fake aircraft carrier" will "make the Iranians look pretty silly".

== Gallery ==
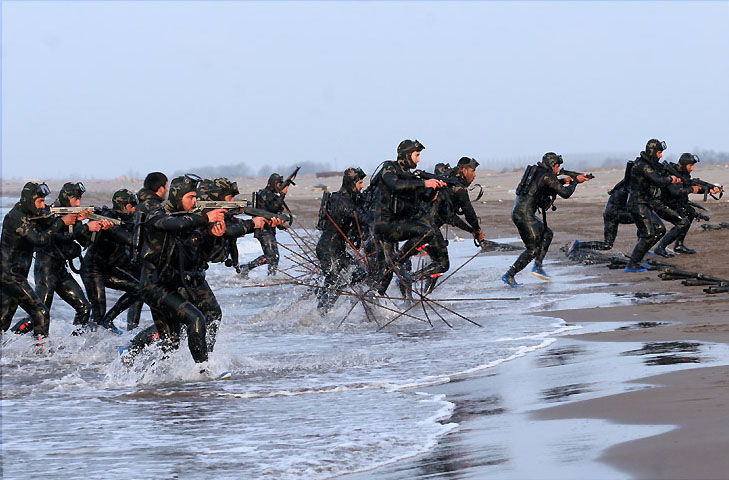
IRGCN frogmen equipped with T9 and Z-84 submachine guns in an amphibious exercise of Great Prophet IX war games exercise

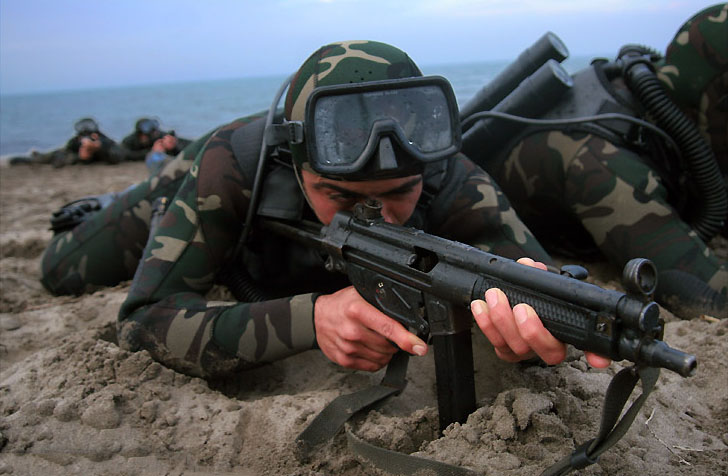
IRGCN frogman equipped with T9 submachine gun in Great Prophet IX war games exercise

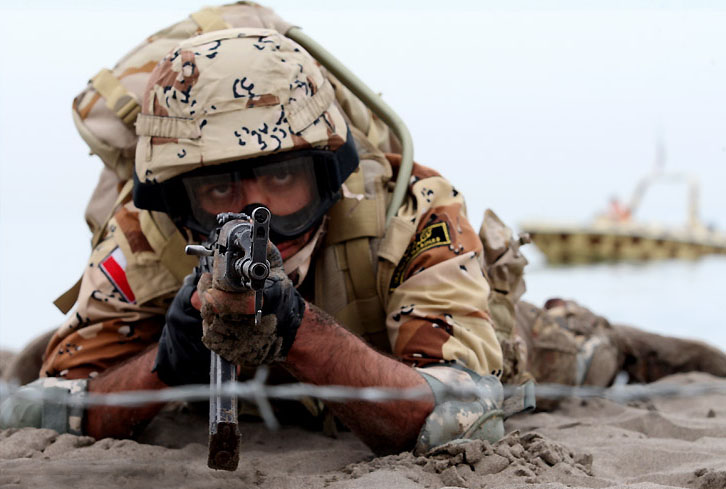
An S.N.S.F. Marine equipped with KL-7.62

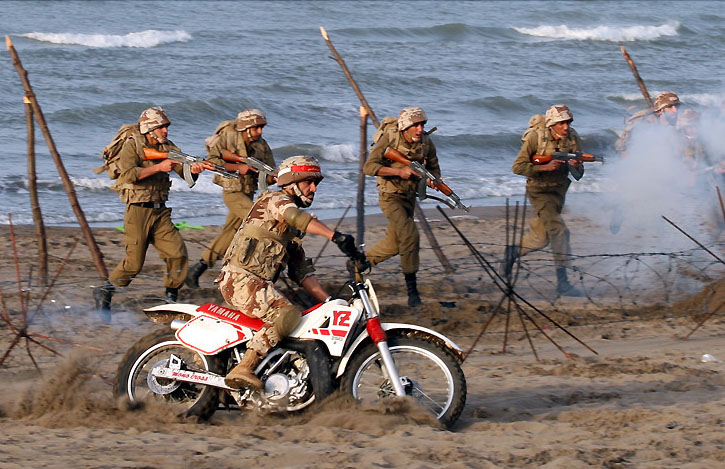
IRGCN marine on a 1988 Yamaha YZ250 (used as a "Combat Motorbike").

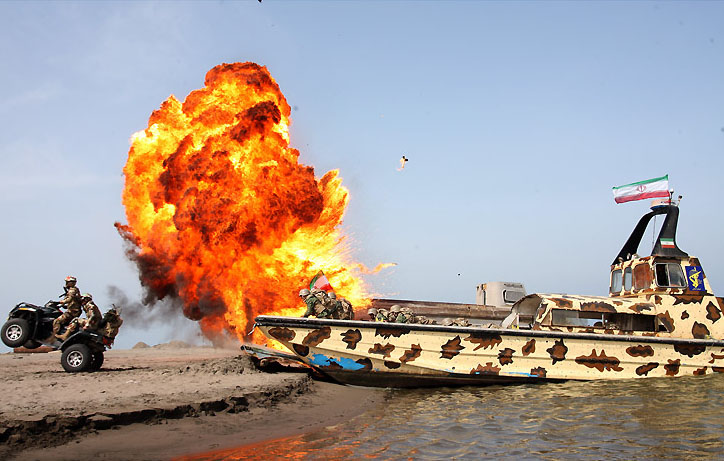
An IRGCN Team approaching the shore, two marines are seen on an ATV.

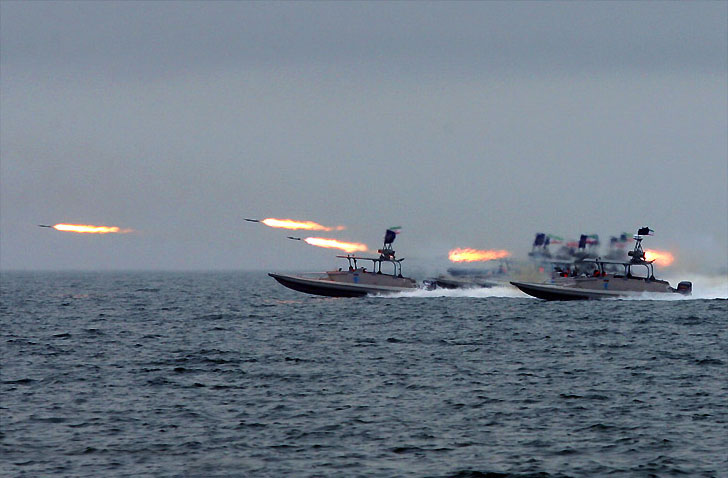
Rocket-armed Speedboats firing rockets on the Nimitz replica.

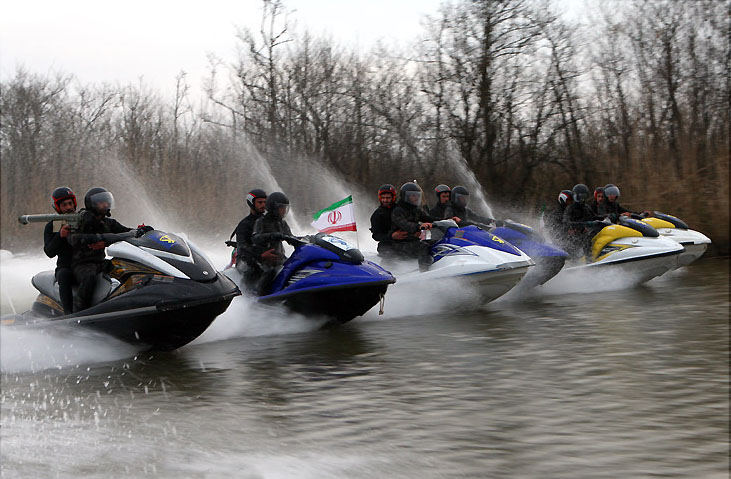
Personal water crafts of IRGCN.

== See also ==
- Navy of the Army of the Guardians of the Islamic Revolution
