= Zulfighar class air-defence boat =

Iranian class of air defence boats

Zulfaghar-class air-defense boat
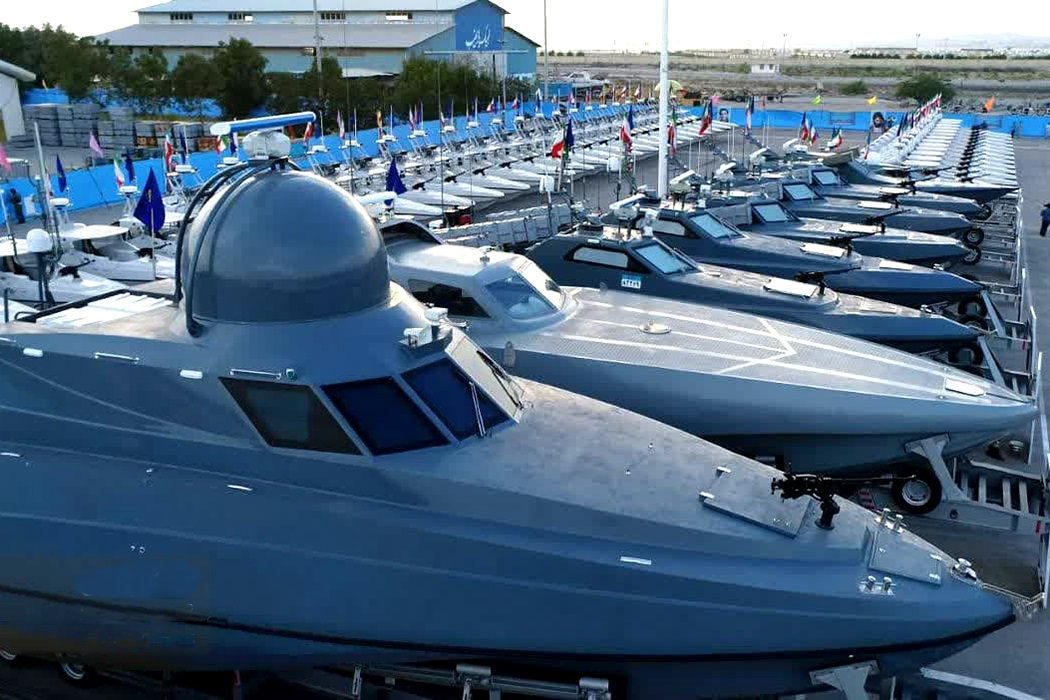

Class overview
- Operators: Navy of the Islamic Revolutionary Guard Corps

General characteristics
- Type: Fast patrol craft
- Displacement: 16 tons
- Length: 15.50 m (50 ft 10 in)
- Beam: 4.40 m (14 ft 5 in)
- Draught: 0.75 m (2 ft 6 in)
- Installed power: Diesel
- Propulsion: 2 × diesel engines
- Speed: 60 knots (110 km/h)
- Sensors & processing systems: AESA radar
- Armament: 4 × VLS cells for Nawab anti-air missile; 1 × 12.7mm machine gun

Zulfighar (Persian: ذوالفقار) is an Iranian class of air-defense boats in service with Iran's IRGCN. They are considered to be the first ever air-defense speedboat and can carry four Nawab anti-air missiles in its VLS cells.

== Design ==
Zulfaghar is based on British speedboat Bladerunner 51 acquired by Iran.

=== Dimensions ===
The said boat is 15.50 m (50 ft 10 in) long, 4.40 m (14 ft 5 in) wide and 0.75 m (2 ft 6 in) tall.

=== Propulsion ===
She is powered by two diesel engines which gives her about 60 knots (110 km/h) of speed.

=== Armament ===
Zulfiqar has four vertical launch system (VLS) cells behind its radome, each capable of carrying one Nawab anti-air missile (the naval variant of the Zoubin air-defense system). Additionally, she is equipped with a single 12.7mm machine gun and an AESA radar for target detection and missile guidance.
