= Ali Azmaei =

Iranian military officer

Sardar Ali Ozmaei
- علی عظمایی
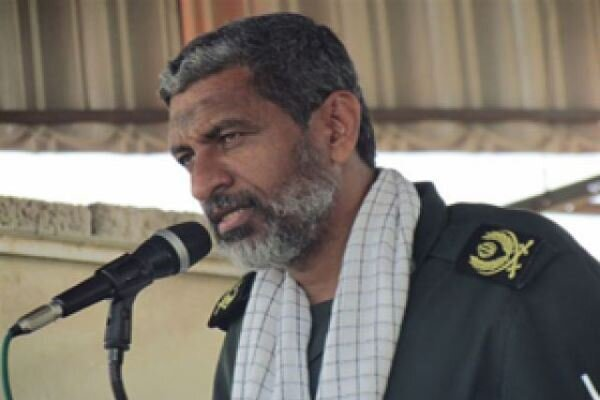
- Azmaei in 2022
- Military career
- Allegiance: Iran
- Branch: IRGC
- Service years: c. 1980–present
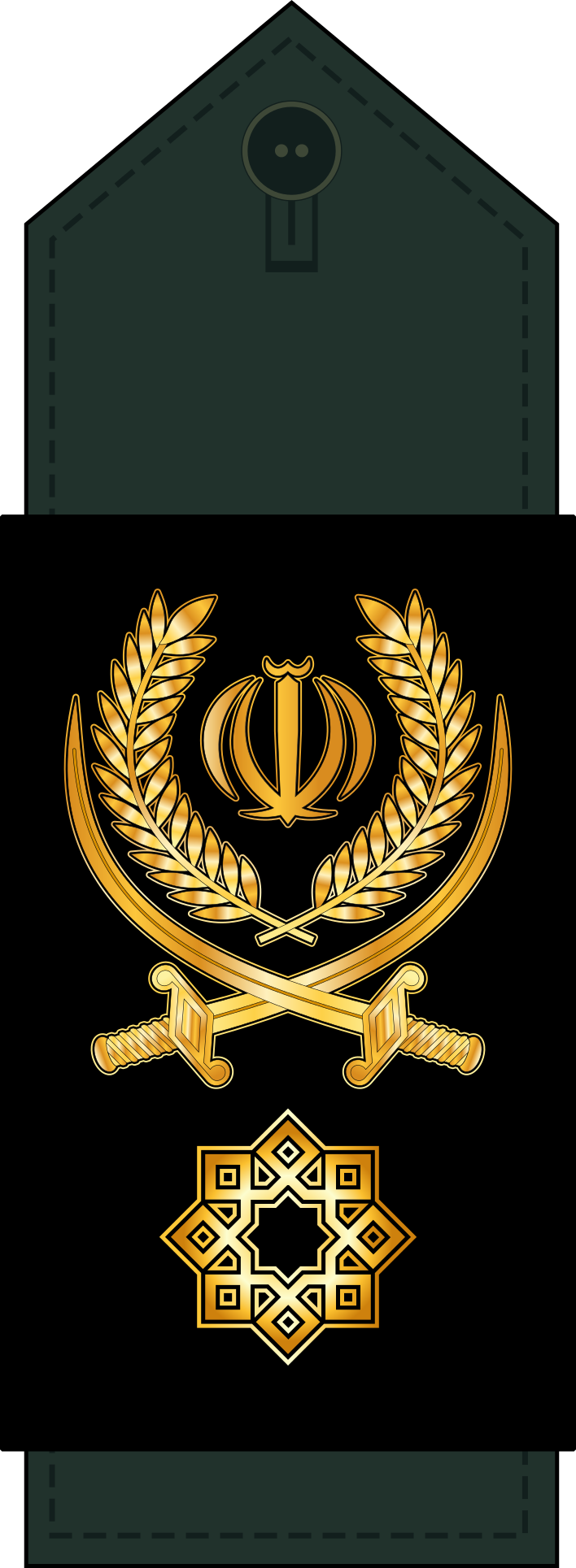
- Rank: Commodore
- Unit: Navy
- Commands: IRGC Navy (2026–present); Imam Baqir 5th Naval Region (2012–2025)
- Conflicts: Iran–Iraq War; Twelve-Day War; 2026 Iran war

7th Commander of the Islamic Revolutionary Guard Corps Navy
- Incumbent
- Assumed office 4 July 2026
- Preceded by: Alireza Tangsiri

Ali Ozmaei (Persian: علی عظمایی; also romanized Ozmaei) is an Iranian military officer who has served as the commander of the Islamic Revolutionary Guard Corps Navy (IRGC Navy) since July 2026. He succeeded Alireza Tangsiri, who was killed during the 2026 Iran war. Before his appointment, Azmaei had commanded the IRGC Navy's Fifth Naval Region for about thirteen years.

== Military career ==
Azmaei began his military service during the Iran–Iraq War with the IRGC's Hormozgan corps, and later joined the IRGC Navy. From the mid-2000s he served as chief of staff and coordinating deputy of the Saheb al-Zaman 1st Naval Region, and from 2010 to 2012 as its deputy commander.

In November 2012 he was appointed the first commander of the newly formed Imam Baqir 5th Naval Region, headquartered at Bandar Lengeh on the Persian Gulf. The region's area of responsibility extends from Qeshm to Kish and includes the Tunb and Abu Musa islands. He held the command for about thirteen years, one of the longest tenures at that level in the force. During this period he was frequently the public face of Iranian vessel seizures in the Strait of Hormuz. In March 2022 he was promoted from second brigadier general to full brigadier general (sartip).

In 2025 Azmaei became deputy commander of the IRGC Navy. Following the assassination of Alireza Tangsiri during the 2026 Iran war, he was appointed commander of the IRGC Navy on 4 July 2026.

== Sanctions ==
Azmaei has been subject to U.S. Department of the Treasury sanctions since 2019, when the United States designated several senior IRGC Navy commanders.
