= Azar-class patrol boat =

Iranian navy patrol boat

Azar-class patrol boats
Class overview
- Builders: CN Lamar, La Spezia, Italy
- Operators: Imperial Iranian Armed Forces
- Built: 1954–1955
- Completed: 9
- Scrapped: 9

General characteristics
- Type: Patrol boat
- Displacement: 65 tons standard
- Installed power: Diesel
- Propulsion: 2 × engines
- Speed: 22 kn (41 km/h)
- Armament: 2 × machine guns

Azar (Persian: آذر) was a class of nine patrol boats that was built in Italy for the Imperial Iranian Navy. The boats were named Azar, Chahab, Derakhsh, Navak, Peykan, Tondar, Tondbad, Toufan and Tousan. Built in the early 1950s, all probably were stricken in the 1970s.

== See also ==
- List of naval ship classes of Iran
