= IRIS Shahid Nazeri =

Iranian naval vessel

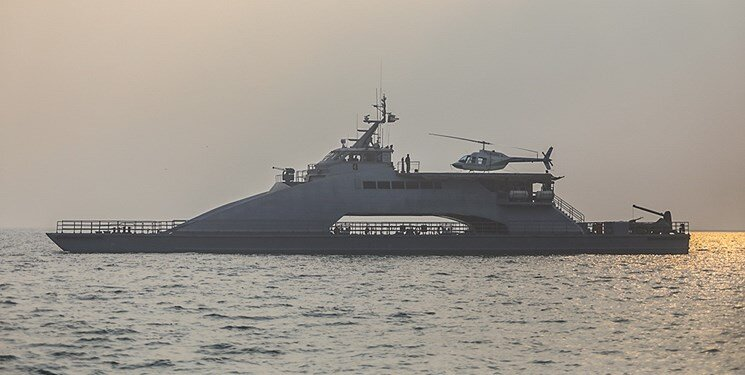

History

Iran
- Name: Shahid Nazeri
- Namesake: Mohammad Nazeri
- Operator: Navy of the Islamic Revolutionary Guard Corps
- Builder: Shahid Mahallati Shipyard, Bushehr
- Commissioned: 13 September 2016
- Home port: Bandar Abbas, Iran
- Identification: Code letters: EQNA
- Status: In active service

General characteristics
- Displacement: ~800 tonnes
- Length: 55.0 m (180 ft 5 in)
- Beam: 14.1 m (46 ft 3 in)
- Installed power: Diesel engine
- Propulsion: 2 × Shafts
- Speed: 28 knots (52 km/h)
- Range: 5,400 nmi (10,000 km)
- Aircraft carried: 1 × helicopter

Shahid Nazeri (Persian: شهید ناظری) is a high-aspect-ratio twin-hull vessel operated by the Navy of the Islamic Revolutionary Guard Corps of Iran.

== Name ==
The vessel is named after Mohammad Nazeri, the first commander of the IRGCN marines. It has been referred to as support ship HARTH 55 by the American military intelligence agencies.

== Description ==
The vessel is 55 metres (180 ft 5 in) long with a claimed long-range support capability of 5,400 nautical miles (10,000 km; 6,200 mi). With a super-slender aluminum hull, she is capable of carrying some 100 troops and has also a helipad for one aircraft. Shahid Nazeri's speed is reportedly 28 knots (52 km/h; 32 mph).

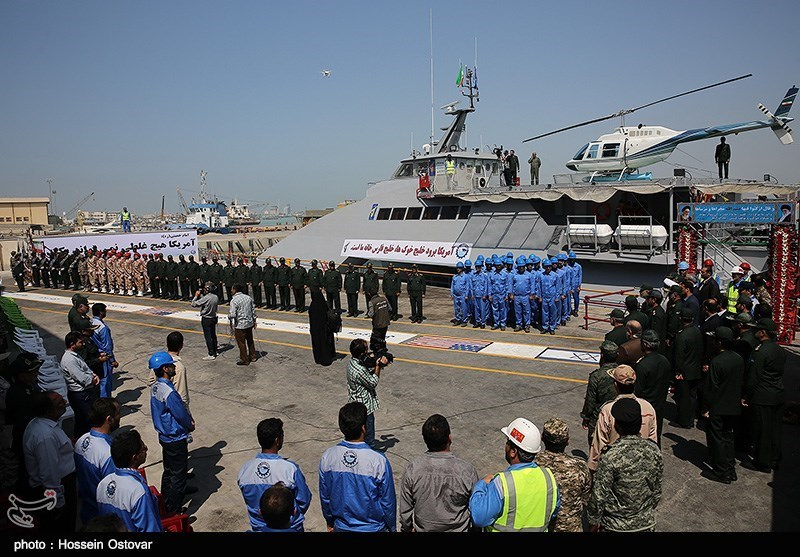
A Bell 206 helicopter landing on the vessel

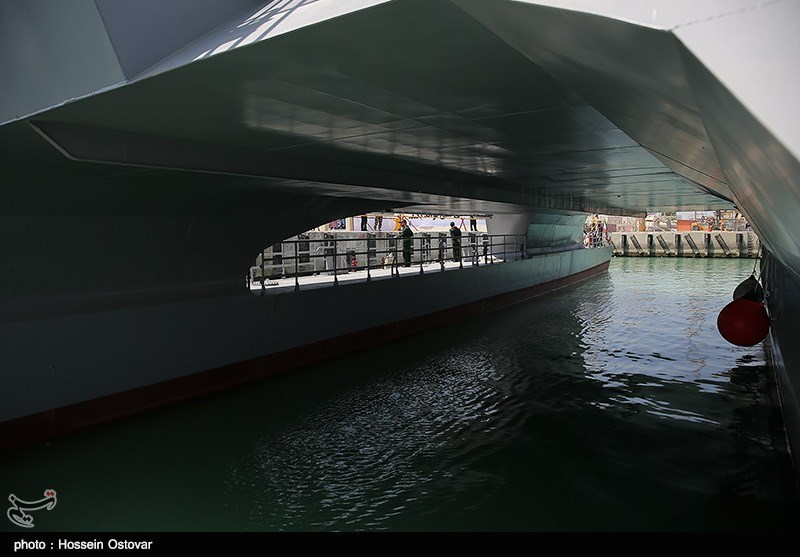
Aluminum hull of the vessel

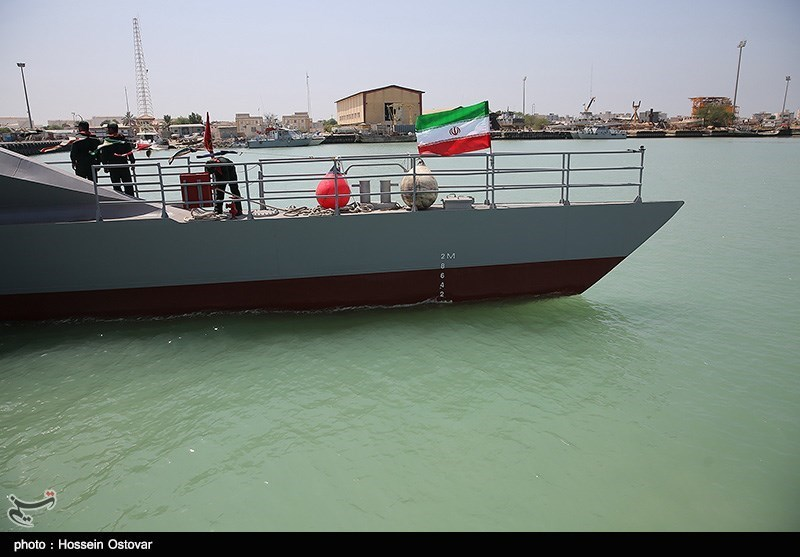
Waterline of the vessel

== Operational history ==
Shahid Nazeri was commissioned in September 2016 at Bushehr.

In April 2017, satellite imagery suggested that Shahid Nazeri was relocated to an operational naval base at the headquarters of 1st Naval Region in Bandar Abbas. The vessel did not participate in the Exercise Velayat 95 and only made "brief stints into nearby waters". Shahid Nazeri was among Iranian vessels that participated in Marine Security Belt joint wargame with the Chinese and Russian navies, whose units were led respectively by the destroyer Xining and the frigate Yaroslav Mudry.

== Analyses ==
Kelsey D. Atherton of the Popular Science opined that the vessel is "mostly for show" and "[i]t’s unclear how the Nazeri fits into this larger speedboat-heavy strategy". Chris Biggers commented at Bellingcat that "[a] high-speed catamaran-like vessel could be useful" for Iran for establishing itself as a regional power, as well as moving operations beyond the Strait of Hormuz. Farzin Nadimi, an associate fellow with The Washington Institute, wrote in 2020 that Shahid Nazeri could be the flagship of the IRGC's naval forces because it has not been deployed for long-range missions and spends most of its time moored at the command headquarters.

== See also ==
- IRIS Shahid Sayyad Shirazi
