= Gohar-class patrol boat =

Gohar-class patrol boats
Class overview
- Builders: Abeking & Rasmussen, Lemwerder, West Germany
- Operators: Imperial Iranian Armed Forces; Sudanese Armed Forces
- Built: 1969–1971
- Completed: 3

General characteristics
- Type: Patrol boat
- Displacement: 70 tons standard
- Length: 29 m (95 ft 2 in)
- Beam: 5 m (16 ft 5 in)
- Draught: 1.5 m (4 ft 11 in)
- Installed power: Diesel
- Propulsion: 2 × engines
- Speed: 27–28 kn (50–52 km/h)
- Complement: 19
- Sensors & processing systems: Decca 202 radar
- Armament: 1 × 12.7mm machine gun

Gohar (Persian: گوهر) was a class of patrol boat that was built in the West Germany for the Imperial Iranian Navy. Three vessels in the class (named Gohar, Shahpar and Shahram) were delivered to Iran by Abeking & Rasmussen between 1969 and 1971. In 1975, Iran transferred the boats to Sudan, where they were respectively renamed to Skeikan (or Shekan), Kadir (or Kader) and Karari.

== See also ==
- List of naval ship classes of Iran
