= Iranian high-aspect-ratio twin-hull vessels =

Vessels used by the Islamic Revolutionary Guard Corps

A high-aspect-ratio twin-hull vessel (acronymed HARTH) refers to a certain design of catamaran vessels with small waterplane area. These vessels are built and used by the Islamic Revolutionary Guard Corps (IRGC) of Iran. Such design is considered relatively rare in military usage.

== Design ==
The design of vessels is being described as looking "almost like a pond skater" because of the superstructure sitting above tall legs. Due to the large length of the hulls in the water (also known as pontoons) and also the high height of the deck above the surface, it has a high length-to-width ratio (and is thus called high-aspect-ratio). This design enables small speedboats to move under the ship, which can technically make certain tactical scenarios possible. In comparison to a conventional catamaran, HARTH design allows decreasing the drag forces of the hull and thus breaking the seawater during sailing more easily, as well as more transverse stability in harsh sea states as a result of low heave, pitch and roll motion.

The structure is made of aluminum.

== Types ==
- Shahid Nazeri-class (also known as 'HARTH 55' by the U.S. Navy), unveiled in 2016
- Shahid Soleimani-class, at least three were confirmed to be under construction through commercial satellite imagery as of April 2021, one under construction at the Shahid Mahallati Shipyard in Bushehr, one in Qeshm Island and the other at small boatyard near Bandar Abbas. It is 65 m (213 ft 3 in) long, and its design has been compared to the Chinese Type 22 missile boat and the Taiwanese Tuo Chiang class. The first ship entered service in September 2022. It is equipped with 16 Nayyab short range air defense missiles and 6 Sayyad mid range air defense missiles as well as with four types of cruise missiles having ranges of 90, 140, 300 and 750 kilometers.

== See also ==
- Iranian naval rigid inflatable speedboats
