= MIL 40-class speedboat =

2002 Iranian naval patrol craft ship class

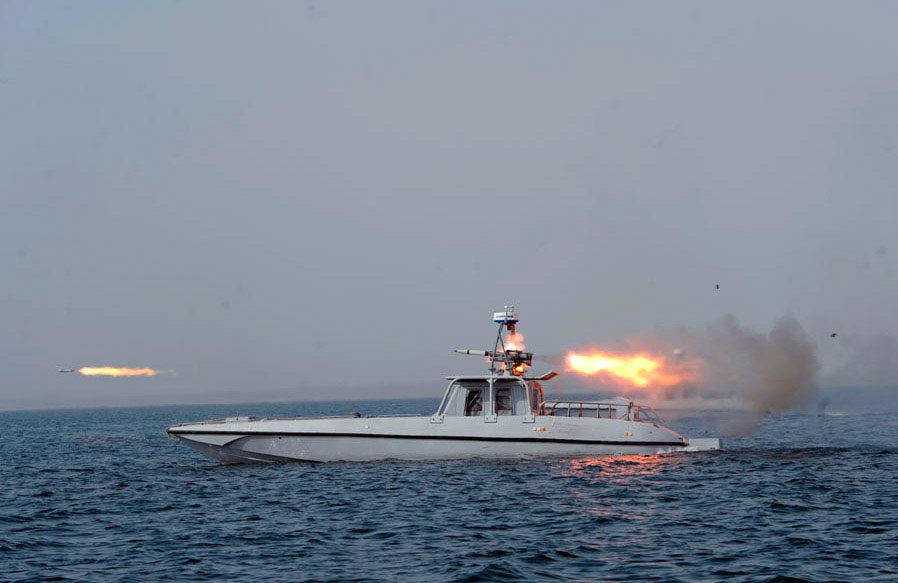

Class overview
- Operators: Navy of the Islamic Revolutionary Guard Corps; Islamic Republic of Iran Navy
- In service: 2002–present

General characteristics
- Type: Patrol boat
- Displacement: 6 tons (estimate)
- Length: 12.9 m (42 ft 4 in)
- Beam: 2.64 m (8 ft 8 in)
- Draught: 0.82 m (2 ft 8 in)
- Installed power: Diesel
- Propulsion: 2 × diesel engines, 1,320 horsepower (0.98 MW)
- Speed: 62 knots (115 km/h)
- Complement: 3
- Armament: 1/2 × machine guns; 1 × multiple rocket launcher

MIL 40 is a class of fast inshore patrol craft operated by both naval forces of Iran.

== Design ==
The design of an MIL 40 boat follows the model of Italian FB Design motorboats, acquired by Iran in 2002. Powered by two Isotta Fraschini diesel engines capable of producing 1,320 horsepower (0.98 MW), the boats move through a piercing propeller and reach a maximum of 62 knots (115 km/h). These are monohull boats made of Kevlar. The class design is 12.9 m (42 ft) long with a beam of 2.64 m (8 ft 8 in) and a draft of 0.82 m (2 ft 8 in). Their estimated standard displacement is 6 t (5.9 long tons).

=== Armament ===
MIL 40 boats are equipped with either a central machine gun mounted on the forward or two machine guns mounted on each side of the boat. A multiple rocket launcher is also installed on the roof.
