= IRIS Shahid Roudaki =

Iranian warship

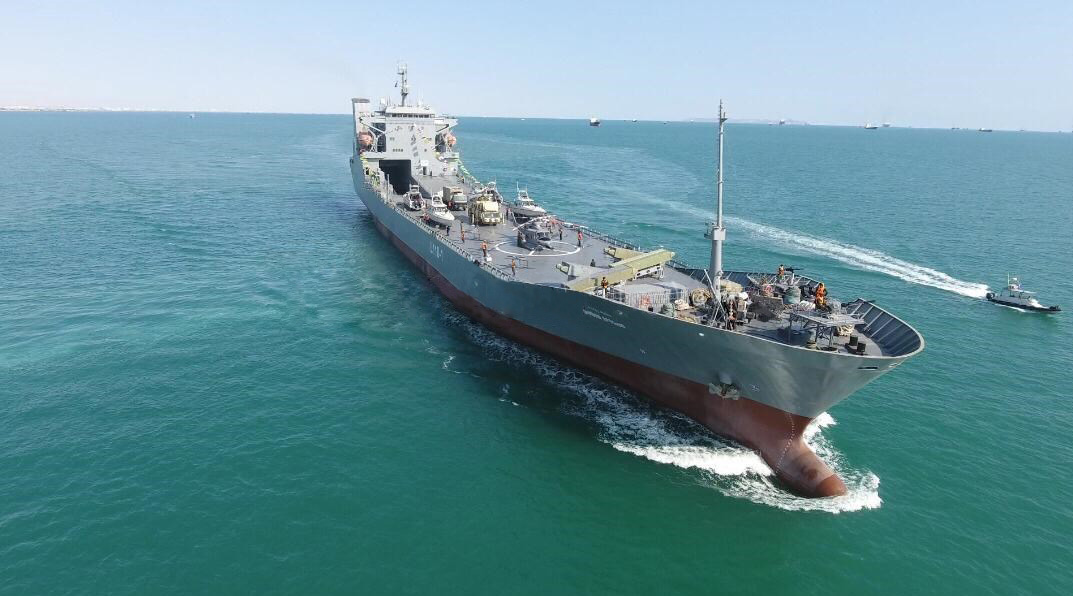

History

Iran
- Name: Shahid Roudaki
- Namesake: Abdollah Roudaki
- Operator: Navy of the Islamic Revolutionary Guard Corps
- Commissioned: 19 November 2020
- Out of service: 1 September 2026
- Home port: Bandar Abbas
- Identification: Pennant number: L110–1; Code letters: EQRO
- Fate: Sunk on 1 September 2026
- Status: Destroyed

General characteristics
- Displacement: 12,000 t (12,000 long tons; 13,000 short tons)
- Length: 150 m (492 ft 2 in)
- Beam: 22 m (72 ft 2 in)
- Armament: 8 × anti-ship missiles (likely Ghadir or Noor); 1 × 20 mm AA gun; Dezful ballistic missiles
- Aircraft carried: Able to carry different types of helicopters (e.g. Bell-412) and different types of drones.
- Aviation facilities: Helicopter landing deck

The IRIS Shahid Roudaki (Persian: شهید رودکی) was an Iranian warship operated by the IRGC Navy that was capable of carrying helicopters, drones and missile launchers.

== History ==
Shahid Roudaki was commissioned into service on 19 November 2020 in a ceremony attended by Major General Hossein Salami and Commander Alireza Tangsiri, commanders of the IRGC and its naval forces respectively. In line with the naming convention of the IRGC she was named after Vice-admiral Abdullah Roudaki, a martyr (Shahid) and commander of the IRGCN who was assassinated.

=== Previous service ===
Jeremy Binnie of Jane's Defence Weekly stated that it is likely that she was the former Galaxy F, an Italian-built cargo ship launched in 1992. H. I. Sutton maintains that "we cannot say for certain, at this stage, that it is her. But Galaxy F is a strong candidate and even if not, the design is essentially identical".

Following such reports, the Italian MP Antonio Zennaro, a member of the Parliamentary Committee for the Security of the Republic, filed a formal interrogation addressing the Italian government, asking it to verify if Shahid Roudaki really was Galaxy F and—if that were the case—if the ship had been sold to the Iranians in contravention to international sanctions against dual-use technology. Also named 'Altinia', and briefly 'Ha Spring'.

== Description ==
Chinese news agency Xinhua has described Shahid Roudaki as a light fleet carrier. Thomas Newdick opines that she was a former roll-on/roll-off ship modified for military purposes, and compares her to the MV Ocean Trader or a much smaller version of the Expeditionary Mobile Base concept.

She displaced 12,000 tonnes and was 150 m (492 ft 2 in) long, with a beam of 22 m (72 ft 2 in), according to a statement released by public relations office of the IRGC.

=== Armament ===
She was equipped with one 23 mm (0.91 in) anti-aircraft gun and several heavy machine guns. The vessel was capable of carrying helicopters and multiple armament on her deck, including drones and missiles. She was equipped with 3D phased-array radar, anti-ship missiles and electronic warfare systems. The vessel functions as a mothership to smaller vessels, as well as a platform for launching unmanned aerial vehicles (UAV).

In the footage of commissioning ceremony, a Bell 412 helicopter, four speedboats, six Ababil-2 drones, a Sevom Khordad TELAR and eight anti-ship cruise missiles in four twin container launchers (possibly of Ghader or Ghadir type) were spotted on her deck. According to H. I. Sutton, it would be unlikely for the IRGC to use the ship with such a formation of equipment in future operations because they were showcasing the asymmetrical roles and potential capability of Shahid Roudaki in the commissioning ceremony.

Shahid Roudaki along with the similar Shahid Mahdavi mothership are able to be armed with Fateh-class ballistic missile containers such as Dezful.

=== Sinking ===
She was set on fire and sank near the Strait of Hormuz, possibly in a US attack on 9 September, 2026, in shallow water with part of the superstructure above water.
