= MK13-class missile boat =

Class of fast patrol craft

Pashe-class speedboat
Class overview
- Operators: Navy of the Islamic Revolutionary Guard Corps
- In service: 2006–present

General characteristics
- Type: Fast patrol boat
- Displacement: 17.8 tons full load
- Length: 13.5 m (44 ft 3 in)
- Beam: 3.7 m (12 ft 2 in)
- Draught: 1.9 m (6 ft 3 in)
- Installed power: Diesel
- Propulsion: 2 × Isotta 1312T2 MSD engines, 2,360 horsepower (1.76 MW); 2 × Trimax 3200 surface drives
- Speed: 60 knots (110 km/h)
- Range: 3,000 nautical miles (5,600 km) at 50 knots (93 km/h)
- Armament: 2 × 324mm torpedo tubes; 2 × missile launchers

MK13 is a class of fast patrol craft armed with both anti-ship missile and torpedo operated by the Navy of the Islamic Revolutionary Guard Corps.

== History ==
MK13 ships are probably built in China, and are reportedly in service since 2006.

== Design ==
=== Dimensions and machinery ===
The ships have a displacement of 17.8 t (17.5 long tons) at full load. The class design is 13.5 m (44 ft) long, would have a beam of 3.7 m (12 ft) and a draft of 1.9 m (6 ft 3 in). It uses two Trimax 3200 surface drives, powered by two Isotta 1312T2 MSD diesel engines. This system was designed to provide 2,360 horsepower (1.76 MW) for a top speed of 60 knots (110 km/h). Its cruising radius is 3,000 nautical miles (5,600 km) at a speed of 50 knots.

=== Structure ===
The monohull body of the MK13-class is made of aluminium.

=== Armament ===
The ships are equipped with two 324mm torpedo tubes, as well as two anti-ship missile launchers with Nasr. The latter relies on internal guidance and terminal homing to 38 kilometres (21 nmi) at 0.8 Mach.
