= Cougar-class speedboat =

Iranian naval speedboat class

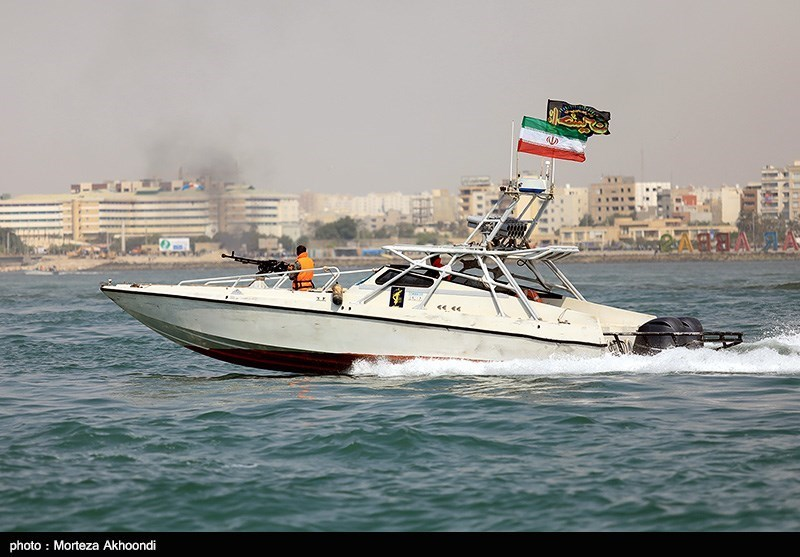

Class overview
- Operators: Navy of the Islamic Revolutionary Guard Corps
- In service: 2007–present

General characteristics
- Type: Patrol boat
- Installed power: Diesel
- Armament: 2 × 12.7mm machine guns

Cougar is a class of fast patrol boat operated by the Navy of the Islamic Revolutionary Guard Corps of Iran.

== History ==
The vessel was first commissioned into the fleet in 2007, when at least ten of this class were unveiled.

== Design ==
According to Jane's Fighting Ships, Iranian Cougar-class vessels are similar to a craft operated by Hong Kong Maritime Police. The source cites the details of the class the same as Hong Kong vessel, while pointing that they may be different.

=== Speculated characteristics ===
The Hongkonger vessels (Damen Cougartek-class) are built by Damen, Gorinchem and their full load displacement is 9 t (8.9 long tons). The class design is 14.8 m (49 ft) long, would have a beam of 2.7 m (8 ft 10 in) and a draft of 1.2 m (3 ft 11 in). Powered by three Innovation Marine Sledge Hammer engines coupled with three shafts, the nominal power is 1,590 horsepower (1.19 MW) for a top speed of 60 knots (110 km/h).

=== Armament ===
Iranian Cougar vessels are equipped with two 12.7mm machine guns. They also use unknown radars.
