= Kashdom-class speedboat =

Iranian military boat

Kashdom-class vessel
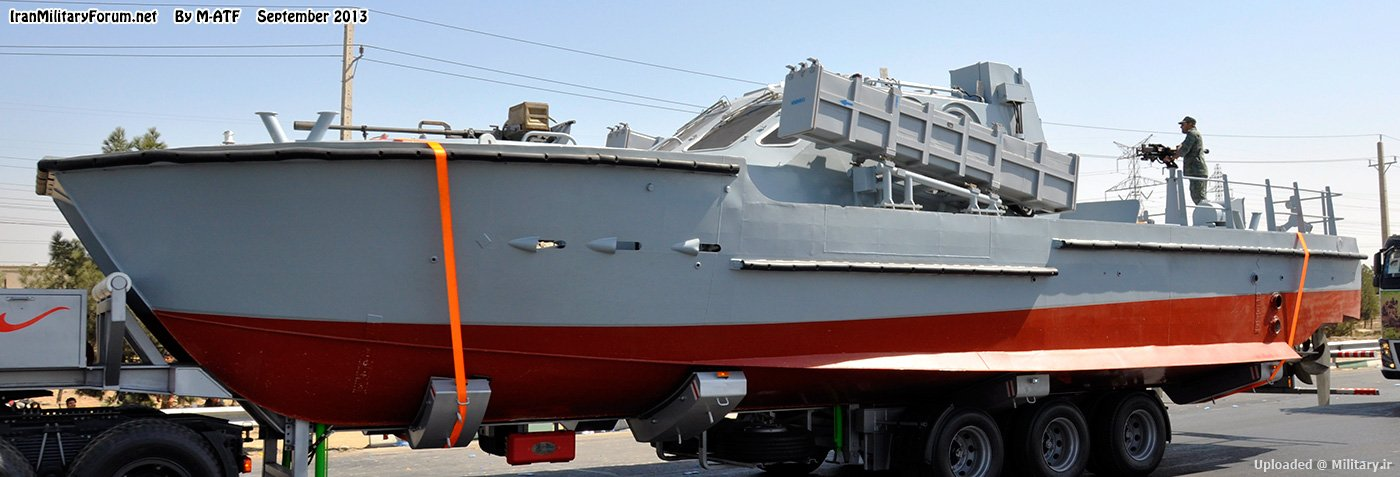

Class overview
- Operators: Navy of the Islamic Revolutionary Guard Corps

General characteristics
- Type: Patrol boat
- Displacement: 17.8 tons (estimate)
- Length: 16 m (52 ft 6 in)
- Beam: 3 m (9 ft 10 in)
- Draught: 1.1 m (3 ft 7 in)
- Installed power: Diesel
- Propulsion: 2 × diesel engines, 2,400 horsepower (1.8 MW); surface piercing propeller
- Speed: 50 knots (93 km/h) (estimate)
- Complement: 5
- Armament: 1 × 12.7mm machine gun; 1 × 23mm machine gun; 1 × multiple rocket launcher; 2 × single anti-ship missile launchers

Rezvan (Persian: رضوان, lit. 'paradise'), also known as Kashdom, is a class of twin-hulled fast inshore patrol craft Fast operated by the Navy of the Islamic Revolutionary Guard Corps of Iran.

== Design ==
=== Dimensions and machinery ===
The ships have an estimated standard displacement of 17.8 t (17.5 long tons). The class design is 16 m (52 ft) long, would have a beam of 3 m (9.8 ft) and a draft of 1.1 m (3 ft 7 in). It uses a surface piercing propeller, powered by two diesel engines. This system was designed to provide 2,400 horsepower (1.8 MW) for an estimated top speed of 50 knots (93 km/h).

=== Armament ===
Kashdom-class boats are of earlier generations were equipped with a 12.7mm and another 23mm machine gun. Latest versions (Kashdom III and IV) have a cabin roof with a mounted multiple rocket launcher, as well as anti-ship missile launchers.
