= Semi-submersible naval vessel =

Warship that uses water ballast to minimise above-water profile

A low-profile/semi-submersible naval vessel is a hybrid warship, that combines the properties of a surface ship and submarine by using water ballast to partially immerse and minimize its above-waterline profile, thereby improving its stealth characteristics when in hostile waters. The USS Monitor was an antecedent to such craft with its low-profile deck and gun turret. Russian and North Korean semi-submersible naval vessels evolved from torpedo boats and special forces boats that could partially submerge (sometimes to snorkel depth) to perform their missions. The US Navy SEALs use such vessels for clandestine special forces actions. Efforts to embody advantageous surface-ship characteristics into submarines have not been widely adopted.

== Antecedent ==
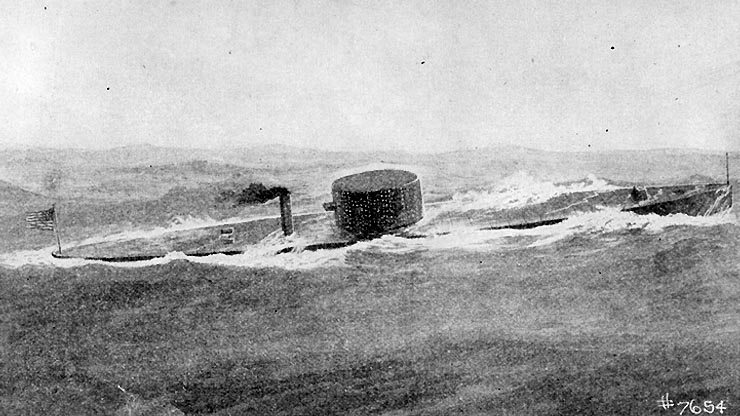
The first US Navy ironclad ship, the USS Monitor, exhibited a low surface profile.

USS Monitor was an iron-hulled, steam-powered warship—built during the American Civil War—as the first ironclad warship commissioned by the Union Navy. The Monitor is noted for its role in the Battle of Hampton Roads in 1862, when it fought indecisively against the casemate ironclad, CSS Virginia. The novel design of the ship, distinguished by its revolving turret and low profile, was quickly duplicated and established the monitor type of warship for use in shallow coastal waters. Its low-freeboard deck—only 18 inches (46 cm) above the water—with a single gun turret gave it the appearance of a "cheesebox on a raft", according to observers of the time. The designer, John Ericsson, had deliberately minimized the observable surface of the vessel and the area that it presented as a target. The Monitor was not designed to be semi-submersible, however.

== True semi-submersibles ==
Examples of true semi-submersible naval vessels were developed in the Russian Empire, North Korea and the United States.

=== Russian Empire ===
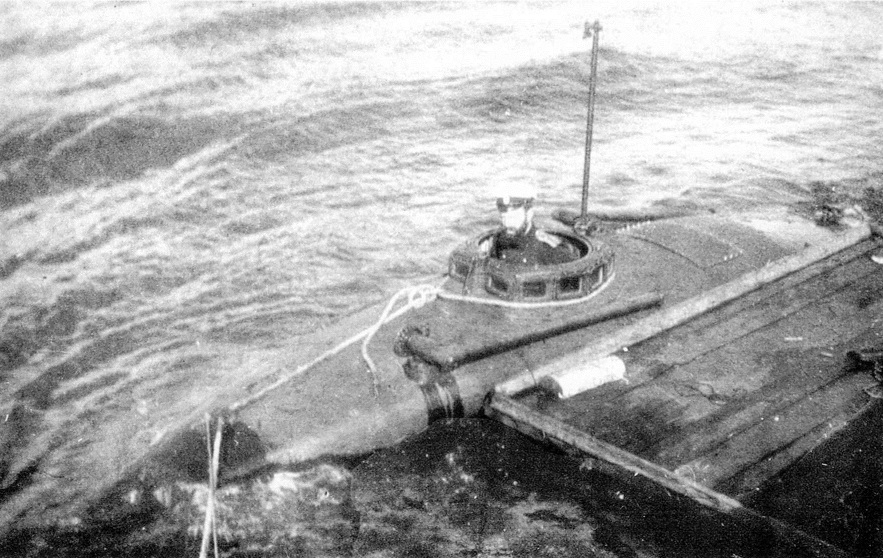
Semi-submersible Imperial Russian Navy torpedo boat, Keta

The Imperial Russian Navy developed semi-submersible vessels—starting with the Keta—which were designed to be torpedo boats with low visibility for coastal protection against enemy warships. Keta was built in 1904 in St. Petersburg, powered by a 14-horsepower (10 kW) motor, displacing 8 tons, and with a length of 7 metres (23 ft). It saw service in 1905 during the Russo-Japanese War to protect the coast in the Far East. Keta was followed by other designs, "Variant D" and "Type F".

=== North Korea ===
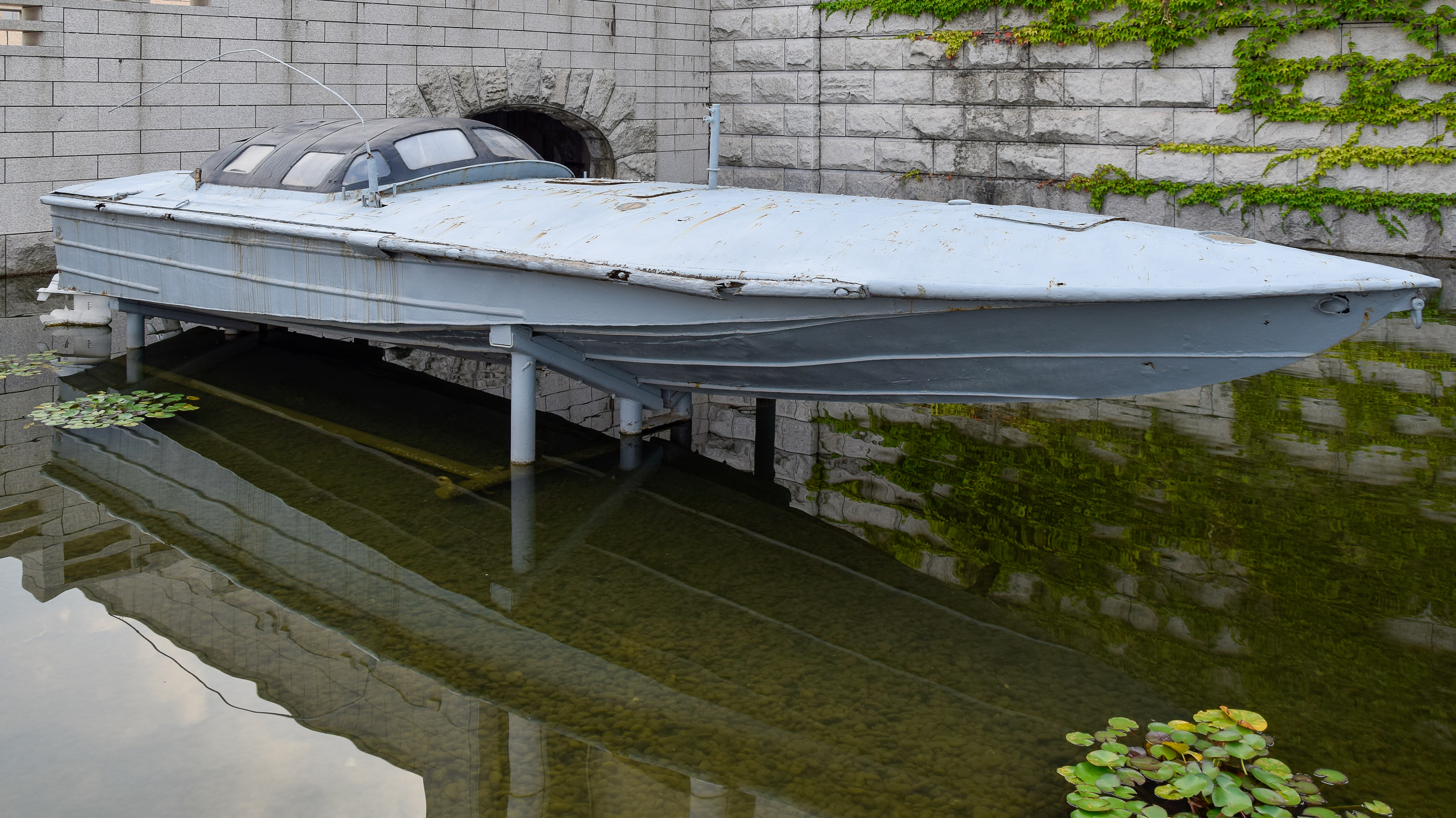
A captured North Korean SP-10 Semi-submersible

According to the Covert Shores Naval Warfare Blog, North Korea's Korean People's Navy developed semi-submersible for infiltration of agents and use by special forces. These derived from high-speed surface craft, sometimes disguised as fishing vessels. The I-SILC model was the first semi-submersible, which could submerge to snorkel depth to power its combustion engine. Approaching its insertion point, the vessel operates as a planing power boat. This evolved into two models of Taedong semi-submersibles, the B and C models, which were exported to Vietnam and Iran. The Taedong–C is a semi-submersible variant of the IPS-16 Peykaap torpedo boat. North Korean semi-submersibles have been intercepted while making incursions into South Korean waters.

In 2002, North Korea delivered five Taedong semi-submersible vessels to the Iranian Navy as part of an arms shipment that included other types of gunboats and patrol boats.

=== United States ===
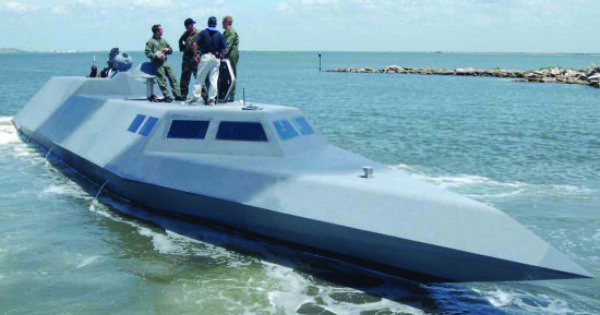
Naval Special Warfare Command SEALION II

In 2014, the United States Naval Special Warfare Command (NAVSPECWARCOM) unveiled its SEAL Insertion, Observation, and Neutralization (SEALION) craft, designed and built as a Combatant Craft Heavy (CCH). The craft is designed for low radar observability and can carry crew and payload internally. At that time there were two units operational, with a third one ordered for delivery in 2018. The SEALION is reportedly a semi-submersible with a planing hull for surface running and ballast tanks to run with a reduced profile. Its dimensions are 80 feet (24 m) long, 14.5 feet (4.4 m) abeam, and 9.5 feet (2.9 m) from keel to cabin roof. It displaces 80,000 pounds (36 t) and is powered by two ten-cylinder, 1,500-horsepower (1,100 kW) diesel engines. Its aft payload bay is configured to accommodate either two inflatable boats, one special forces modified jet ski, or eight seats.

== Submarine hybridization ==
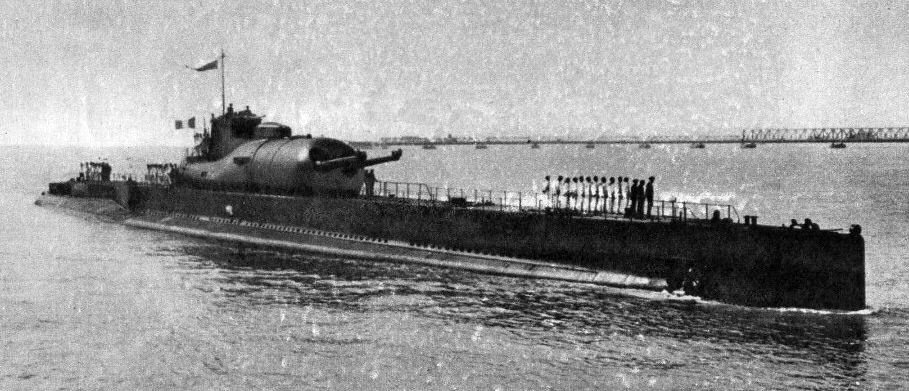
French submarine, Surcouf with heavy artillery

As a related development, the hybridization of submarines to acquire certain surface ship attributes has included the augmentation of firepower and surface speed.

=== Firepower ===
Cruiser submarines combined the stealth of a submarine with the endurance and firepower of a surface ship; several were the largest submarines built at the time of their launching. They were designed to attack merchant marine shipping with heavy deck guns, as well as torpedoes. They were generally slower to dive and offered a bigger sonar signature than conventional submarines. Examples are:

- The 1916 German Type U 139 submarine (WWI, 3 boats), which mounted two 15-centimetre (5.9 in) SK L/45 deck guns and two 8.8-centimetre (3.5 in) SK L/30 deck guns.
- The 1923 HMS X1, which mounted two 5.2-inch (130 mm) guns in 2 twin turrets.
- The 1934 French submarine Surcouf, which mounted two 203-millimetre (8 in) naval guns.
- The 1939 Soviet K-class submarines, which mounted two 100-millimetre (3.9 in) naval guns.

=== Speed ===
SMX-25, a French design concept for a submarine that travels at high speed on the surface to arrive in theater.

Before the advent of nuclear power, submarines were slower on the surface than surface ships and even slower underwater. Therefore, efforts were made to increase submarine surface speeds to that of surface-only ships. Examples:

- The 1916 British K-class submarine was equipped with steam turbines to provide sufficient surface-running speed to accompany the battle fleet as a reconnaissance vessel, but proved to be unsuccessful.
- The 1930s Soviet Pravda class embodied the hull contours of a destroyer for high speed on the surface, but proved to be underpowered.
- The 1945 Japanese Sentaka Type submarines (潜高型潜水艦, Sen-Taka-gata sensuikan, "Submarine High speed type"), with the I-201 (large) and Ha-201 (small) classes, specially built to achieve higher underwater speeds (up to 21 kn (39 km/h; 24 mph)).
- The 1960s Soviet Project 1231 was a concept for a missile boat that would travel with hydrofoils on the surface and then dive to avoid observation, which was never built.
- The 2010 French SMX-25 was a submarine design concept by defence company, DCNS, with surface ship characteristics, which would allow high surface speed for more rapid deployment to the combat zone and then submerging to attack.

== See also ==
- Heavy-lift ships, which partially submerge to allow their cargo (another ship or a semi-submersible platform) to float into place for transport
- Narco-submarines, used to smuggle drugs, some of which remained partially above the surface.
- Semi-submarines, which cannot fully submerge
- Semi-submersible platforms, which are typically transported to a location where they are placed in service
