= Tarlan-class speedboat =

2005 Iranian fast torpedo boat class

Tarlan-class torpedo boat
Class overview
- Operators: Navy of the Islamic Revolutionary Guard Corps
- In service: 2005–present

General characteristics
- Type: Torpedo boat
- Displacement: 9 tons (standard)
- Length: 11.9 m (39 ft 1 in)
- Beam: 3.1 m (10 ft 2 in)
- Draught: 0.65 m (2 ft 2 in)
- Installed power: Diesel
- Propulsion: 2 × diesel engines, 1,320 horsepower (0.98 MW); 2 × surface piercing propellers
- Speed: 50 knots (93 km/h)
- Complement: 2

Tarlan is a class of fast torpedo boat operated by the Navy of the Islamic Revolutionary Guard Corps of Iran. A modified version of this class has been referred to as Dalaam.

== History ==
The class is manufactured by Iran, and was first reported in 2005.

== Design ==
=== Dimensions and machinery ===
The ships have a standard displacement of 9 t (8.9 long tons). The class design is 11.9 m (39 ft) long, would have a beam of 3.1 m (10 ft) and a draft of 0.65 m (2 ft 2 in). It uses two surface piercing propellers, powered by two diesel engines. This system was designed to provide 1,320 horsepower (0.98 MW) for a top speed of 50 knots (93 km/h).

=== Structure and armament ===
The vessel's hull is made of aluminum, and is of catamaran type. It has a 1.5 high pedestal, which may be capable of supporting an anti-armor guided weapon. Tarlan boats can fire high-speed rocket torpedoes.
