= MIL 55-class speedboat =

Iranian naval patrol craft class

Class overview
- Operators: Navy of the Islamic Revolutionary Guard Corps; Islamic Republic of Iran Navy
- In service: 2003–present

General characteristics
- Type: Patrol boat
- Displacement: 15.5 tons (estimate)
- Length: 16.43 m (53 ft 11 in)
- Beam: 2.85 m (9 ft 4 in)
- Draught: 0.84 m (2 ft 9 in)
- Installed power: Diesel
- Speed: 72 knots (133 km/h) (estimate)
- Complement: 5

MIL 55 is a class of fast inshore patrol craft operated by both naval forces of Iran.

== Design ==
The boats are based on a model of Italian FB Design motorboats acquired by Iran in 2003. Powered by two Isotta Fraschini diesel engines producing 2,400 horsepower (1.8 MW), they are propelled by surface piercing propeller and are estimated to reach a top speed of 72 knots (133 km/h). They are structurally monohull, and made of Kevlar. The class design is 16.43 m (53.9 ft) long, would have a beam of 2.85 m (9 ft 4 in) and a draft of 0.84 m (2 ft 9 in).
