= Peykaap III-class missile boat =

Iranian fast patrol craft operated by IRGC

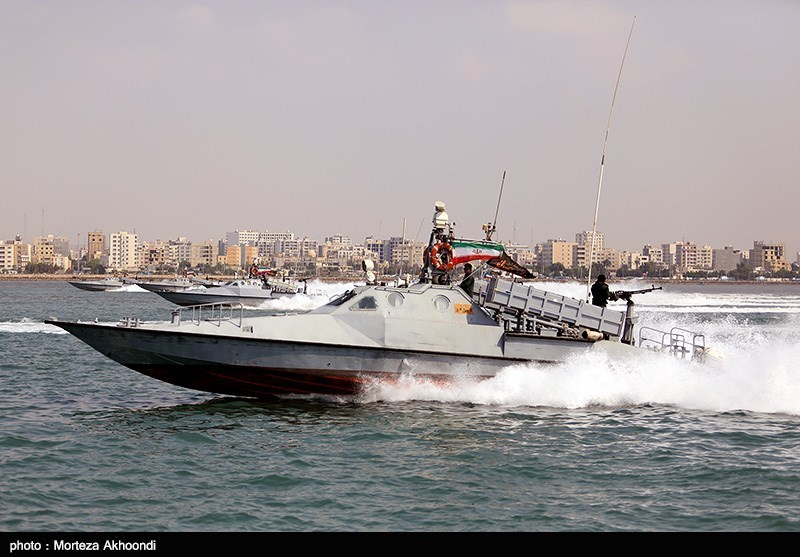

Class overview
- Operators: Navy of the Islamic Revolutionary Guard Corps

General characteristics
- Type: Fast patrol craft
- Displacement: 13.75 tons
- Length: 17.3 m (56 ft 9 in)
- Beam: 3.75 m (12 ft 4 in)
- Draught: 0.7 m (2 ft 4 in)
- Installed power: 2 × diesel engines, 2,400 horsepower (1.8 MW)
- Propulsion: 1 × propeller
- Speed: 52 knots (96 km/h; 60 mph)
- Complement: 3
- Armament: 2 × single anti-ship missile launchers; 2 × 12.7 mm machine gun

Zolfaghar (Persian: ذوالفقار, named after Zulfiqar; also known as Peykaap III) is a class of missile-armed fast patrol craft operated by the Navy of the Islamic Revolutionary Guard Corps of Iran.

== Design ==
The Peykaap III is a modified version of North Korean IPS-16, manufactured by Iran.

=== Dimensions and machinery ===
The ships have an estimated standard displacement of 13.75 t (13.53 long tons). The class design is 17.3 m (56 ft 9 in) long, would have a beam of 3.75 m (12 ft 4 in) and a draft of 0.7 m (2 ft 4 in). It uses one surface piercing propeller, powered by two diesel engines. This system was designed to provide 2,400 horsepower (1,800 kW) for an estimated top speed of 52 knots (96 km/h; 60 mph).

=== Armament ===
Peykaap III crafts are equipped with two single anti-ship missile launchers with Kowsar or Nasr, which rely on internal guidance and active terminal homing to 38 kilometres (21 nmi) at 0.8 Mach. It is also compatible with Chinese torpedoes. Their secondary armament is two 12.7 mm machine gun.

== History ==
In July 2023, the Venezuelan Zolfaghars were displayed, armed with Nasr-1 anti-ship missiles. They were presented in the wake of the Royal Navy's HMS Trent arrival in Guyana.

On February 24, 2024, the Peykaap IIIs were sighted near the Gulf of Paria.

== Users ==
- Iran - Islamic Revolutionary Guard Corps Navy
- Venezuela - Bolivarian Navy of Venezuela
