= Kajami-class torpedo boat =

Class of semi-submersible fast torpedo boat

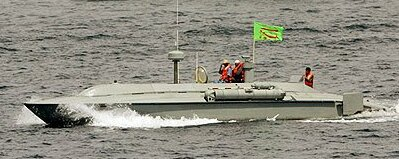

Class overview
- Operators: Navy of the Islamic Revolutionary Guard Corps; Islamic Republic of Iran Navy
- In service: 2002–present

General characteristics
- Type: Torpedo boat
- Displacement: 30.4 tons
- Length: 21 m (68 ft 11 in)
- Speed: 50 knots (93 km/h) (estimate)
- Armament: 2 × torpedo tubes

Zolfaghar (Persian: ذوالفقار, named after Zulfiqar), also known as Kajami, is a class of semi-submersible fast torpedo boat operated by both naval forces of Iran.

== History ==
Allegedly originating from the North Korea as Taedong-B, there are reports suggesting that two boats of this class were delivered to Iran on 22 December 2002.

== Design ==
There is not much known confidently about these vessels. They are estimated to have a standard displacement of 30.4 t (29.9 long tons) and can possibly reach a top speed of 50 knots (93 km/h). From measurements, only length is known to be about 21 m (69 ft). Kajami class can carry two lightweight torpedoes of unknown type. According to Jane's Fighting Ships, the vessel is likely designed for a high-speed approach towards enemy on the surface, and then submerging for almost 3 m (9.8 ft) before using the snort mast for an attack.
