= Sepah Navy Special Force =

Takavar special forces unit of the Iran's Islamic Revolutionary Guard Corps

Special Unit of NEDSA
- یگان ویژه ندسا
- Country: Iran
- Allegiance: Supreme Leader of Iran
- Branch: Islamic Revolutionary Guard Corps
- Type: Special forces
- Role: Special operations
- Part of: Navy
- Garrison/HQ: Greater Farur Island
- Engagements: Gulf of Aden anti-piracy operations

Commanders
- Current commander: Commodore Sadegh Amoie

The Special Unit of NEDSA (Persian: یگان ویژه ندسا), also known as Sepah Navy Special Force (SNSF; Persian: نیروی ویژه دریایی سپاه), is a Takavar (commando) unit in the Islamic Revolutionary Guard Corps Navy (or NEDSA), stationed on the Greater Farur Island in the Persian Gulf.

== Mission set ==
The unit has marines, frogmen and snipers specializing in heliborne, amphibious warfare and naval boarding.

SNSF personnel train in combat diving, direct action, counterterrorism, special reconnaissance, underwater demolitions, amphibious assault, hostage rescue, and maritime visit, board, search, and seizure (VBSS) operations. Among the unit’s missions is to protect Iranian commercial vessels, and SNSF personnel have deployed to the Gulf of Aden to assist with Iranian counterpiracy operations.

== Operations in Gulf of Aden ==
In 2012, the force conducted a 117-day operation in Gulf of Aden to combat piracy off the coast of Somalia, which included collaboration with the American forces, such as a Sikorsky UH-60 Black Hawk providing reconnaissance for the unit's ship.

== MSC Aries ship seizure ==
On April 13, 2024, Iranian naval commandos seized the MSC Aries, a Portuguese-flagged civilian container ship belonging to Gortal Shipping, for “violating maritime laws”.

== Weapons ==
The Iranian produced Tondar SMG (Heckler & Koch MP5) 9mm is known to be used by the unit. The Spanish produced Star Model Z84 sub-machine gun is also favored by the unit. The Iranian produced AKM 7.62x39mm is also used by the unit in some situations. AK-103 is used by this force.

== Gallery ==
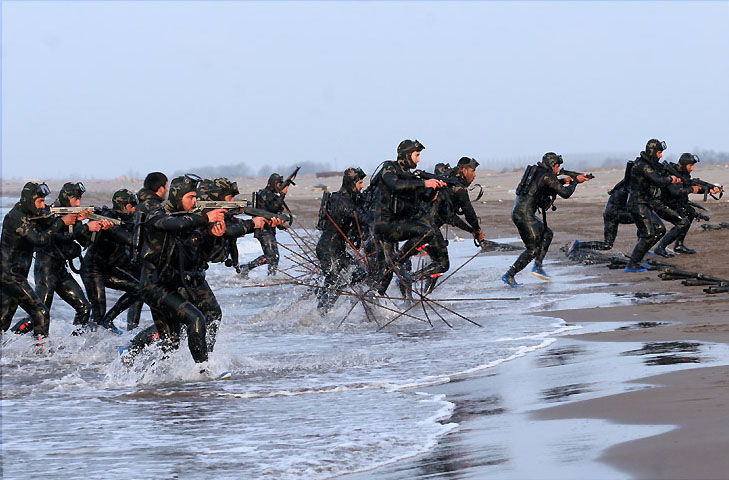
Takavar members in Great Prophet IX maneuver, 25–27 February 2015

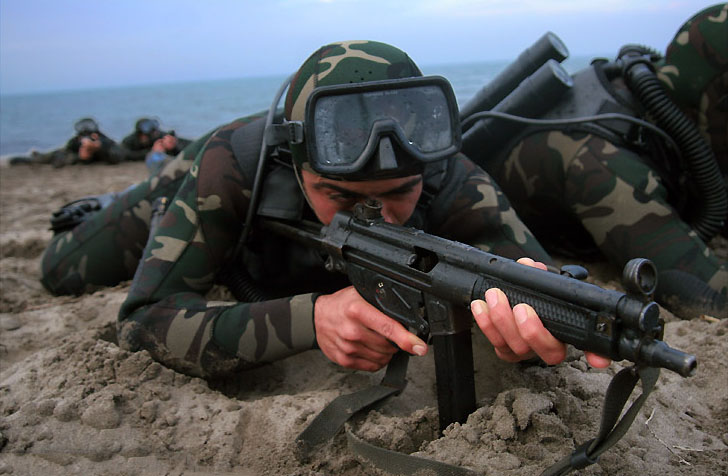
An IRGC frogman in an amphibious exercise of Great Prophet IX

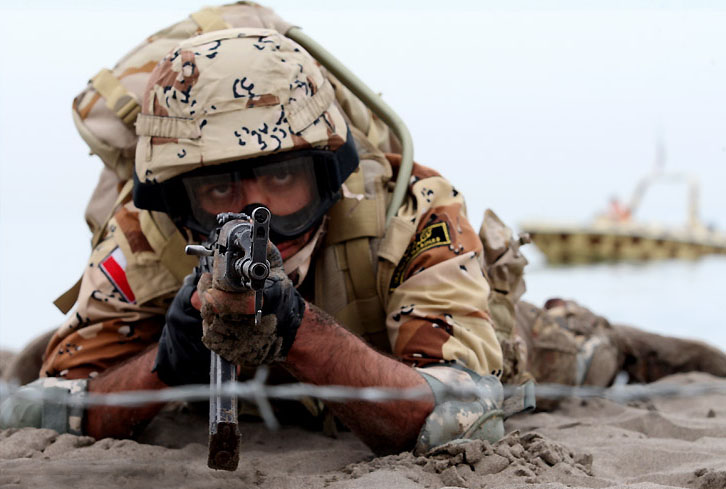

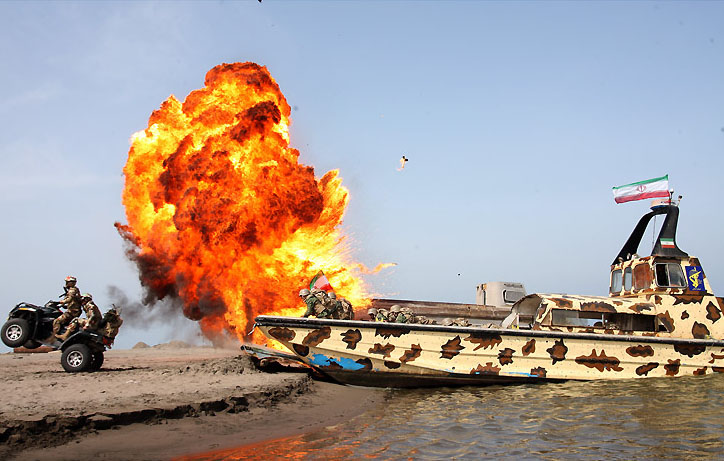
