= Qader (missile) =

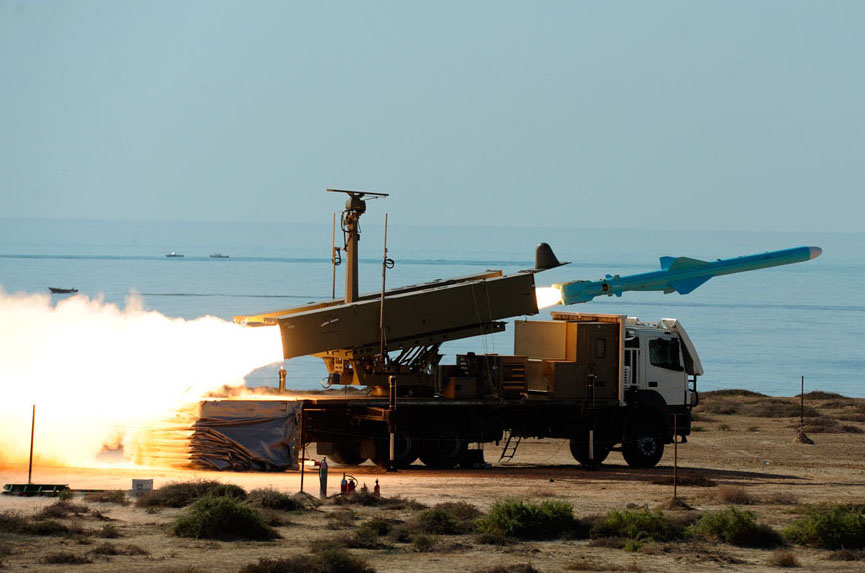
- Firing Qader Missile in Velayat-90 Naval Exercise
- Type: Anti-ship cruise missile
- Place of origin: Iran

Service history
- Used by: Iranian Navy; Navy of the Revolutionary Guards; Hezbollah; Houthi

Production history
- Manufacturer: Iranian Aviation Industries Organization

Specifications
- Warhead: 200 kilograms (440 lb) HE
- Engine: turbojet
- Operational range: 200 km
- Flight altitude: Sea-skimming

The Qader (Persian: قادر) is a medium-range anti-ship cruise missile developed by Iran.

== Development ==
The missile called "Qader" (Able) is an upgraded version of Noor (a copy of Chinese C-802 missile). The missile, which was unveiled in August 2011, has a range of 200 km and was described by Iranian officials as "the most powerful and precise missile of the Islamic Republic of Iran’s Navy".

On 10 February 2013, the head of Iran Aviation Industries Organization announced that an air-launched version of Qader and Nasr-1 would be tested soon.

== Features and capabilities ==
Range of Ghader ASCM in green

- Anti-ship cruise missile with a range of 200 km
- A 200-kilogram warhead
- Anti-ship cruise missile flying at low altitude with a low radar cross section
- Digital autopilot system
- High-precision navigation system
- The possibility of planning to shoot missiles
- Advanced radar and ability to deal with electronic warfare
- Quick preparation and reaction missile to attack on coastal targets in addition to a targeted vessel
- Ability to launch from land, sea and air

Management systems: active radar can fly at a height of 3 to 5 meters

== Operational history ==
Iran made a false claim on 25th March that Qader cruise missiles had hit the USS Abraham Lincoln during the 2026 Iran war. The ship was not hit during the failed strikes, and the pictures posted by Iranian propaganda accounts on social media were of the USS Bonhomme Richard fire in 2020.

== See also ==
- Islamic Republic of Iran Armed Forces
- Defense industry of Iran
- List of equipment of the Iranian Army
