= Alireza Tangsiri =

Iranian military officer (1962–2026)

Sardar Alireza Tangsiri
- علیرضا تنگسیری
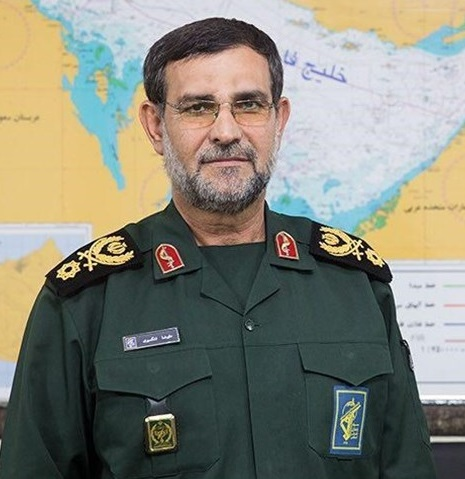
- Tangsiri in 2020
- Born: 27 August 1962; Tangestan, Bushehr, Pahlavi Iran
- Died: 26 March 2026 (aged 63); Bandar Abbas, Iran
- Cause of death: Assassination by airstrike
- Military career
- Allegiance: Iran
- Branch: IRGC
- Service years: 1980s–2026
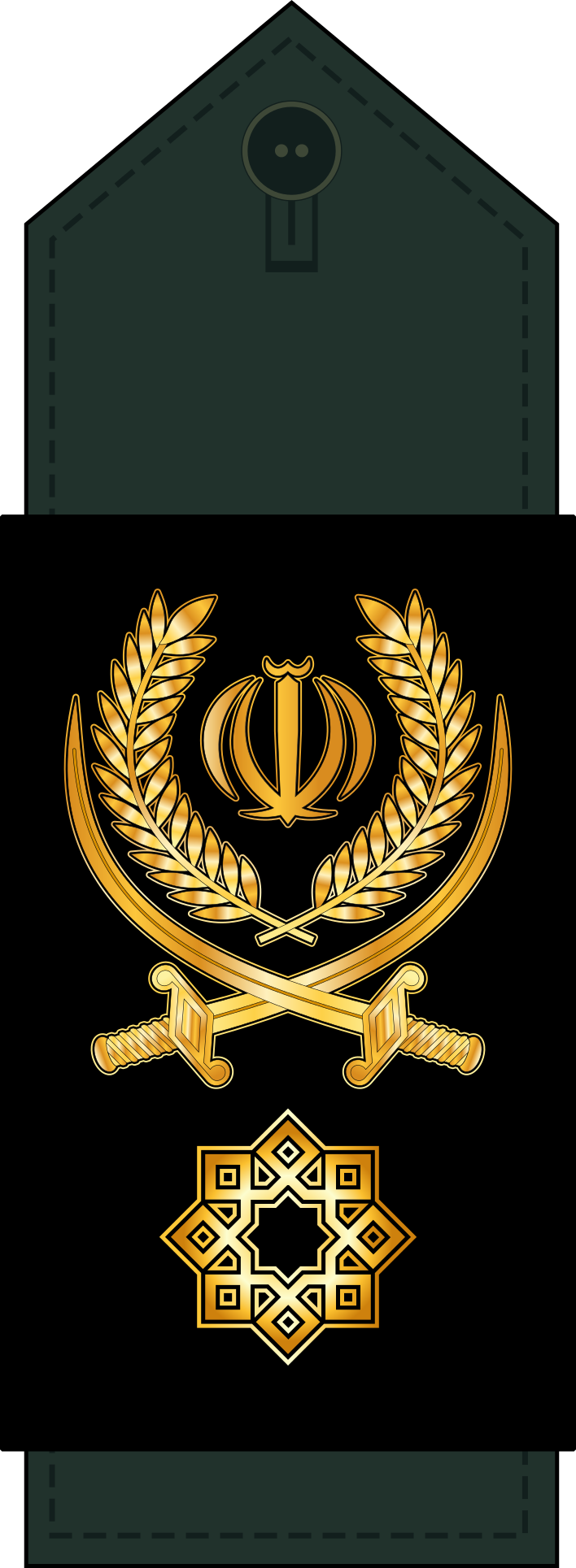
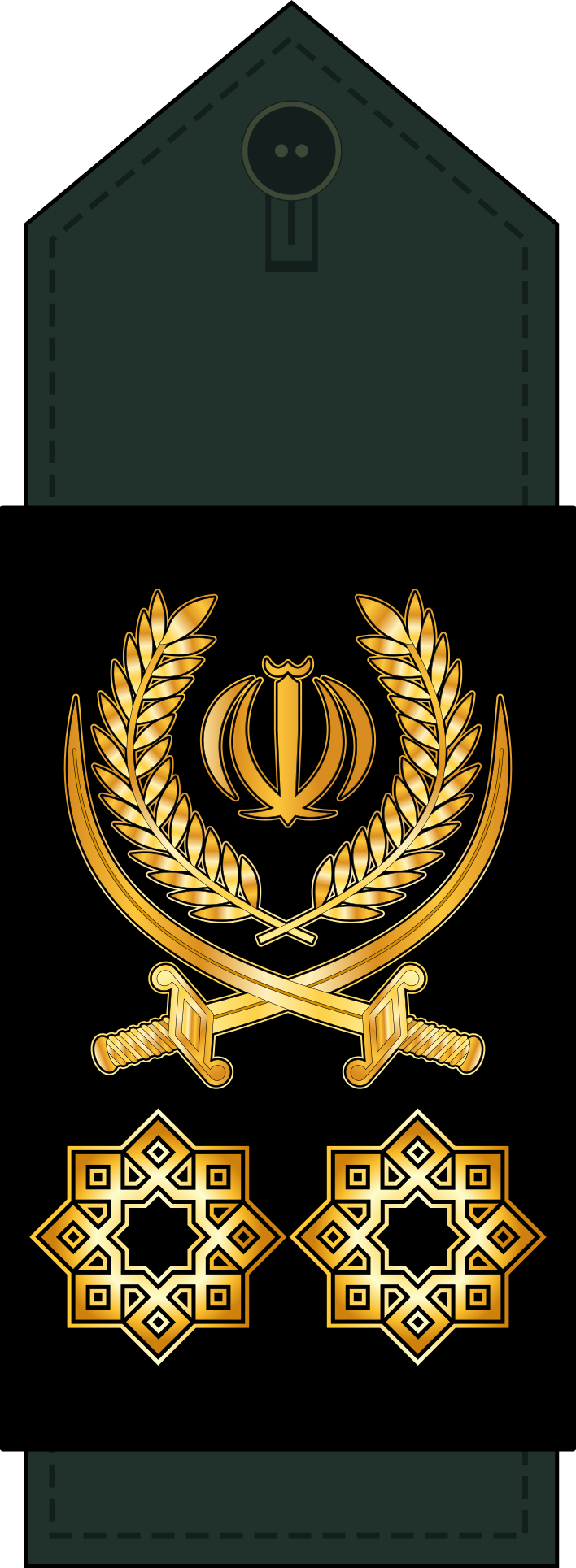
- Rank: Commodore; Rear admiral (posthumously)
- Unit: Navy
- Commands: IRGC Navy (2018–2026); Deputy Commander of the IRGC Navy (2010–2018); Saheb al-Zaman 1st Naval Region (2006–2010); Imam Hossein 3rd Naval Region (2003–2006)
- Conflicts: Iran–Iraq War; 2016 United States–Iran naval incident; 2019–2021 Persian Gulf crisis; 2019 seizure of Stena Impero; 2024 Iran–Israel conflict; Seizure of the MSC Aries; Twelve-Day War; 2026 Iran war †

Alireza Tangsiri (Persian: علیرضا تنگسیری; 27 August 1962 – 26 March 2026) was an Iranian naval officer who served as the commander of the IRGC Navy. He was killed by the Israel Defense Forces during the 2026 Iran war.

== Military career ==
Tangsiri was a naval brigade commander during the Iran–Iraq War. He later headed the Islamic Revolutionary Guard Corps Navy (IRGCN) 1st Naval District in Bandar Abbas.

In September 2007, Tangsiri said that if the United States were "to clash with us, we would chase them even to the Gulf of Mexico."

In January 2016, after Iran detained 10 US sailors in the 2016 United States–Iran naval incident when they had engine failure and entered Iranian waters, Tangsiri described it as "U.S. forces surrendering to Iran."

On 23 August 2018, Iran's Supreme Leader, Ali Khamenei, appointed Tangsiri as commander of the IRGCN.

In November 2021, Tangsiri said that the United States had "come to realize the Islamic Republic’s superiority at sea." In February 2025, he unveiled Iran's first drone carrier, a commercial vessel that had been repurposed, which he described as the “largest naval military project” in the history of Iran. In March 2025, Tangsiri warned that "If the enemies make a mistake, we will send them to the depths of hell," after U.S. President Donald Trump wrote Iran's supreme leader Khamenei urging Iran to reach a nuclear agreement with the U.S. or else face military action.

In April 2025, Tangsiri said that the United States Navy was "incapable" of challenging Iran's maritime dominance.

== Political views ==
In 2013, Tangsiri said: "the Israelis are Jews and the Americans are Christians. Our Quran stresses that they are not our friends."

In 2022, Tangsiri claimed that Saudi rulers descend from the Jews of Medina and Khaybar, enemies of the Prophet Muhammad. He has previously threatened American and British shipping in the Persian Gulf.

== U.S. sanctions ==
On 24 June 2019, the U.S. Treasury Department sanctioned Tangsiri as a Specially Designated Global Terrorist, freezing any of his U.S. assets and banning U.S. persons from doing business with him, under Executive Order 13224. He was sanctioned with secondary sanctions in 2024 due to his position on the board of Paravar Pars Company, an Iranian military company which develops unmanned aerial vehicles and is sanctioned by the United States.

== Assassination ==
On 26 March 2026, Israel's defense minister Israel Katz and the Israel Defense Forces announced the assassination of Tangsiri. The strike took place in the port city of Bandar Abbas. Katz claimed that Tangsiri had overseen the blockade of the Strait of Hormuz and was directly responsible for attacks in the area. The IDF also claimed that other senior IRGC Navy commanders were killed in the strike. Tangsiri's death was later confirmed by Iranian authorities.

According to Al Jazeera, Ali Hashem described Tangsiri as a well-known IRGC Navy commander who helped shape Iran’s naval doctrine in the Strait of Hormuz and was involved in developing maritime drone capabilities. He also reported that Tangsiri’s social media accounts had posted updates on vessel movements through the strait, which he said were linked to fluctuations in global energy prices. Hashem stated that, according to Israeli reports, Tangsiri survived two assassination attempts in 2025 and 2026 before being killed in Bandar Abbas.

== See also ==
- List of Iranian officials killed during the 2026 Iran war

Military offices
Preceded by Ali Fadavi	Commander of the IRGC Navy; 23 August 2018 – 26 March 2026	Succeeded by Ali Azmaei
Preceded by Ali Fadavi	Deputy Commander of the IRGC Navy; 20 June 2010 – 3 August 2018	Succeeded by Mahmoud Fahimi
Preceded by Mohammad Rahim Dehghani	Commander of the Saheb al-Zaman 1st Naval Region; 2006 – 2010	Succeeded by Reza Torabi
Preceded by ?	Commander of the Imam Hossein 3rd Naval Region; 2003 – 2006	Succeeded by ?i
