= Islamic Revolutionary Guard Corps Navy =

Maritime service branch of Iran's Islamic Revolutionary Guard Corps

- نیروی دریایی سپاه پاسداران انقلاب اسلامی
- Flag
- Founded: 17 September 1985 (41 years ago)
- Country: Iran
- Allegiance: Iran
- Type: Navy maritime land force
- Role: Naval warfare amphibious warfare
- Size: +20,000 (2020)
- Part of: Islamic Revolutionary Guard Corps
- Headquarters: Tehran; Bandar Abbas
- Fleet: c. 126 surface warfare vessels; 5 amphibious vessels; 3 auxiliary ships; 3,000–5,000 speedboats; 58–78 helicopters
- Engagements: Iran–Iraq War; Tanker war; Bridgeton incident; 2004 Iranian seizure of Royal Navy personnel; 2007 Iranian arrest of Royal Navy personnel; 2008 Iran–United States naval dispute; 2015 seizure of Maersk Tigris; 2016 United States–Iran naval incident; 2019–2021 Persian Gulf crisis; 2019 seizure of Stena Impero; 2024 Iran–Israel conflict; Seizure of the MSC Aries; Twelve-Day War; 2026 Iran war

Commanders
- Current commander: Commodore Ali Azmaei

Insignia
- Ensign

The Islamic Revolutionary Guard Corps Navy (IRGCN; Persian: نیروی دریایی سپاه پاسداران انقلاب اسلامی, romanized: niru-ye daryâyi-e sepâh-e pâsdârân-e enghelâb-e eslâmi; officially abbreviated in Persian as NEDSA and also known as the Sepah Navy) is the naval warfare service of the Islamic Revolutionary Guard Corps was founded in 1985, and one of the two maritime forces of Iran, parallel to the conventional Iranian Navy.

In contrast to a conventional Navy, the IRGC Navy follows a distinct doctrine, training system, and equipment structure, prioritizing asymmetric maritime warfare through the use of small fast-attack craft, anti-ship missiles, naval mines, and hit-and-run and swarm tactics rather than traditional naval engagements, and is often described as a “guerrilla navy.” The IRGC Navy also acts as Iran's de facto coast guard and maintains several Marine infantry units, including a naval Takavar battalion, called Sepah Navy Special Force (SNSF).

The Basij Navy has been established with a force of 55,000 sailors and 33,000 boats covering an area from the Persian Gulf to Tanzania, Dar es Salaam, and Zanzibar.

== Name ==
The forces are known with their official abbreviation in Persian, "NEDSA". In maritime radio communications, it is addressed as "Sepah Navy".

== History ==
=== Iran–Iraq War (1985–1988) ===
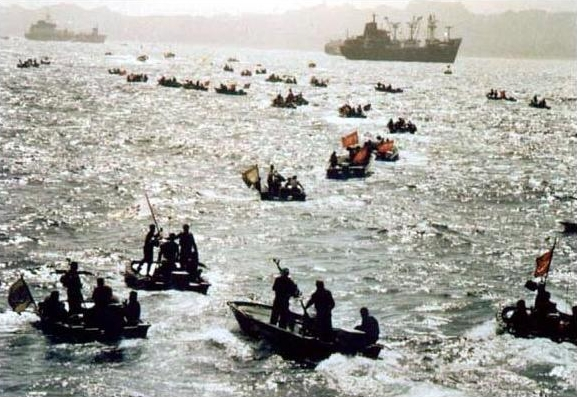
IRGC speedboats in the Shahadat Maritime Manoeuvre (1987)

On 17 September 1985, Iran's supreme leader and commander-in-chief Ruhollah Khomeini ordered Islamic Revolutionary Guard Corps to create three branches including navy. Shortly afterwards, Hossein Alaei was appointed as the commander of the naval forces. The navy was tasked to operate in the Persian Gulf and by 1987 were able to play an active role against Iraqi Navy in the Iran–Iraq War.

During the "Tanker War" phase of the Iran–Iraq War, beside the regular Iranian Navy, IRGC started employing swarm tactics and surprise attacks using Boghammar speedboats fitted with rocket launchers, RPGs, and heavy machine guns. Attacks on Kuwaiti tankers, an Iraqi ally, eventually dragged the US Navy into the Persian Gulf to escort Kuwaiti tankers. As a response, IRGC ordered mining west of Farsi Island on the route of the very first convoy—the Kuwaiti supertanker SS Bridgeton escorted by four US warships—which successfully hit the tanker itself.

The 1988 naval battle between Iran and the US, Operation Praying Mantis, resulted in 1 Iranian frigate being lost (45 crew members killed), 1 gunboat (11 crew members killed), 3 speedboats, and 2 platforms. The US suffered 2 casualties due to an AH-1T Sea Cobra crashing or being shot down.

=== Engagements with the Royal Navy ===
On 21 June 2004, eight sailors and Royal Marines were seized by forces of the Revolutionary Guards' Navy while training Iraqi river patrol personnel in the Persian Gulf. On 23 March 2007, fifteen sailors and Royal Marines from HMS Cornwall were seized by forces of the Revolutionary Guards' Navy in the Persian Gulf.

=== Engagements with the United States Navy ===
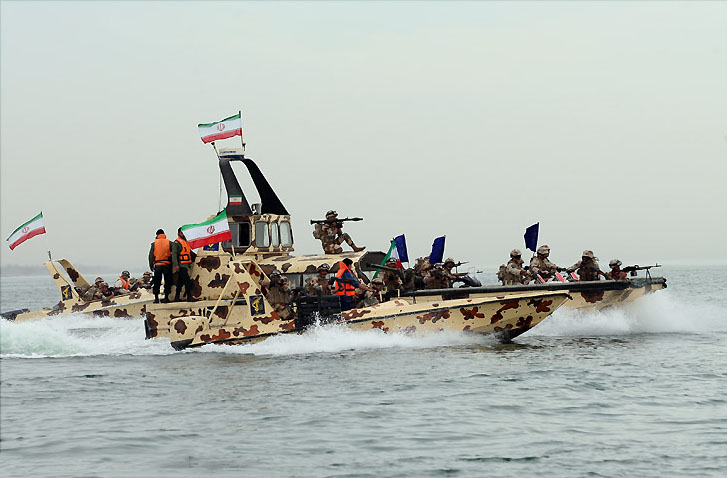
IRGC Navy boat during a naval exercise in 2015

On 7 January 2008, US officials claimed five Iranian speedboats 'harassed' United States Navy vessels in the Persian Gulf. IRGC speedboats made threatening moves and in one case even came within 180 meters of US warships. The US Navy also claimed to have received a radio transmission from Iranian boats saying: "I am coming at you. You will explode in a couple of minutes". After this US ships were said to have taken up their gun positions and were ready to open fire at one of the boats when the Iranians turned away and one of the Iranian speedboats (allegedly) dropped white boxes into the water in front of the U.S. ships, it was not clear what was in the boxes.

Iranian officials and military commanders later downplayed the incidents as normal and denied having sent the radio transmission. After the US released a video showing Iranian speedboats swarming US ships in the Strait of Hormuz, Iran released its own video of the incident after suggesting the US video was staged.

On 12 January 2016, 10 American sailors were taken into custody by IRGC officials off the coast of Farsi Island, which doubles as a naval installation for the IRGC. American officials stated that the sailors were on a training mission when one of their boats experienced a mechanical failure. During this time the vessel drifted into Iranian territorial waters spurring IRGC naval units to respond and apprehend the sailors with both vessels. US Secretary of State John Kerry engaged in a phone call with Iranian officials to defuse the situation. Iranian officials said that the sailors were in custody, but would be freed within hours, understanding that the incident was a mistake.

In 2019, the IRGC Navy allegedly carried out a series of attacks on international vessels in the Gulf of Oman and seized vessels taking them to Iran. As a result, the United States started the International Maritime Security Construct (IMSC) which increases overall surveillance and security in key waterways in the Middle East, according to the Deputy Secretary of Defense Michael Mulroy.

=== 2026 Iran War and impact ===
On 26 March 2026, Israeli sources claimed the death of IRGCN head Alireza Tangsiri, who had been leading a blockade of the Strait of Hormuz. Israel Defense Forces later reported that all of the IRGC Navy’s other key commanders were killed in the strike with Tangsiri as well. U.S. Central Command leader Admiral Brad Cooper afterwards described the Islamic Revolutionary Guard Corps Navy, which had also been greatly damaged from the ongoing 2026 Iran War, as now being "on an irreversible decline." The death of Tangsiri was confirmed some days later by Iran. Nevertheless, Iran has still remained determined to assert control over the Strait of Hormuz.

== Military doctrine and strategy ==
IRGC naval specialty insignias

Navigation

Diving

Marines

Maritime Electronics

Maritime Mechanics

Coastal Missile

IRGC Navy and Artesh Navy overlap functions and areas of responsibility, but they are distinct in terms of how they are trained and equipped— and more importantly also in how they fight. The Revolutionary Guards Navy has a large inventory of small fast attack craft, and specializes in asymmetric hit-and-run tactics. It is more akin to a guerrilla force at sea, and maintains large arsenals of coastal defense and anti-ship cruise missiles and mines.

Janes recognizes the IRGCN as the resuscitator of fast inshore attack craft (FIAC) in the modern era, as well as the most prominent practitioner of "small boat swarm tactics that combine speed, mass, co-ordinated manoeuvre, low radar signature, and concealment" among naval forces of the world.

It has also a Takavar (special force) unit, called Sepah Navy Special Force (S.N.S.F.).

In 2022, the IRGCN had unveiled a new uniform ditching its usual green in favor of white.

== Organization ==

Command	Current commander	Location of headquarters
Naval Regions
1st Region (Saheb al-Zaman)	Capt. Abbas Gholamshahi	Bandar Abbas, Hormozgan Province
2nd Region (Nouh-e Nabi)	Capt. Ramezan Zirahi	Bushehr, Bushehr Province
3rd Region (Imam Hussein)	Vice Cmdr. Yadollah Badin	Mahshahr, Khuzestan Province
4th Region (Sarallah)	Vice Cmdr. Mansour Ravankar	Asaluyeh, Bushehr Province
5th Region (Imam Mohammad Bagher)	Unknown	Bandar Lengeh, Hormozgan Province
Independent components
Special Force	Vice Cmdr. Sadeq Amooie	Faror Island, Persian Gulf
Engineering Command	Unknown	Borazjan, Bushehr Province
Naval Academy	Vice Cmdr. Hossein-Ali Zamani Pajouh	Zibakenar, Gilan Province
Samen al-Hojaj Naval Base	Capt. Parviz Gholipour	Babolsar, Mazandaran Province
Imam Ali Independent Naval Base	Cdr. Seyyed-Mehdi Mousavi	Chabahar, Sistan and Baluchestan Province

== Basij ==
The corps put forward a warfare organization for civilian Iranian citizens fleet since 2019, with the intent to help fight wars and combat contraband and smuggling too.

== Equipment ==
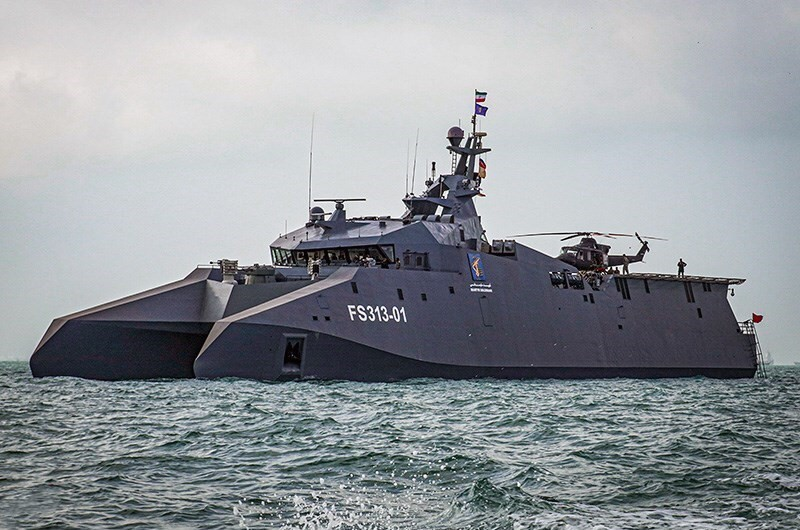
Shahid Soleimani corvette, formerly in service before being sunk in 2026

Shahid Shafiei (P313-3)

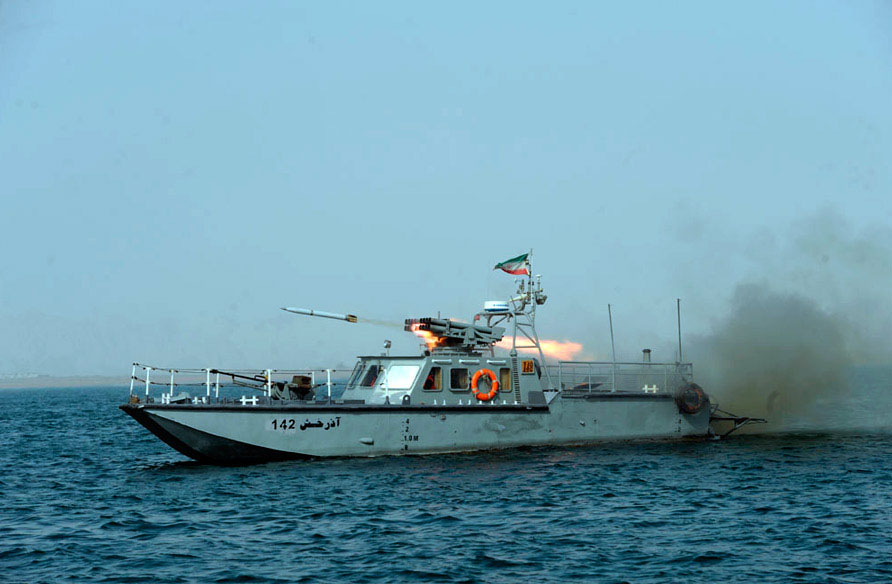
Azarakhsh (142), firing a missile

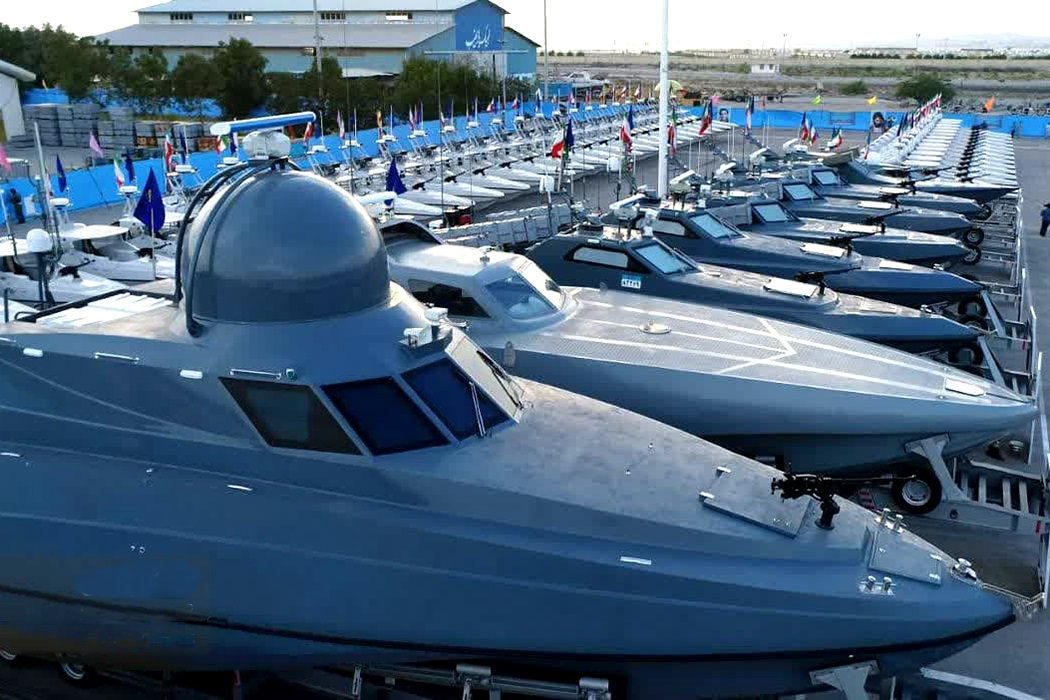
Zulfighar class Air-Defence boat nearest to the camera. Other speedboats also in picture.

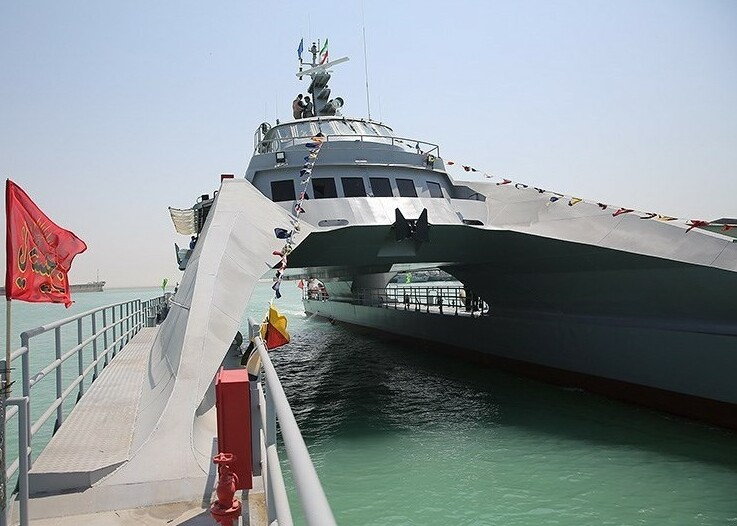
Shahid Nazeri catamaran

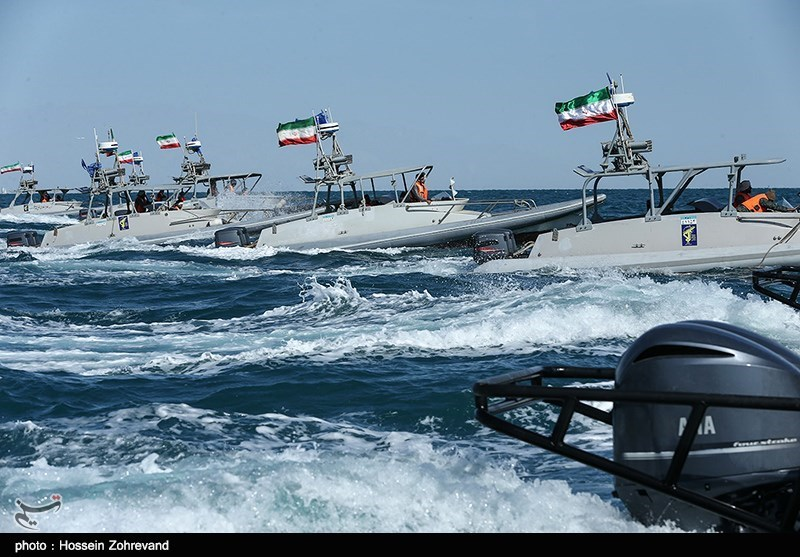
A group of FB-RIB-33 speedboats

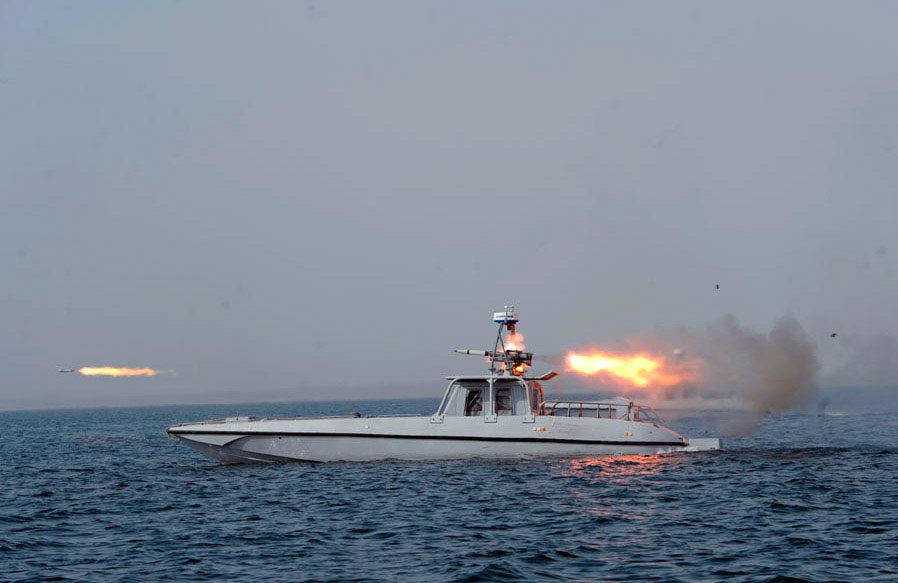
MIL 40 speedboat shooting

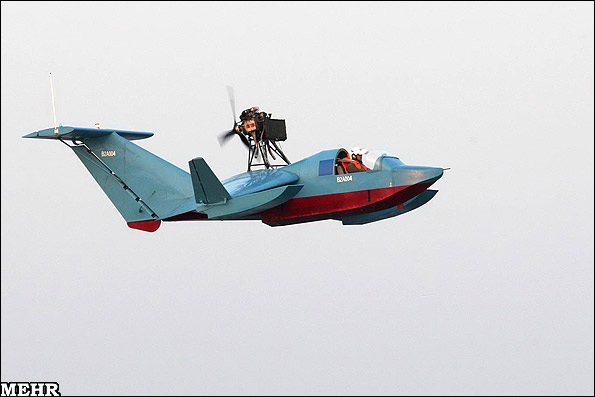
Bavar 2

=== Current ships ===
Type	In service	Class
Patrol boats/Small surface ships (ε126)
Patrol Boat Fast (+AShM)	5 10 10 25 6	C14 class Mk13 class Tondar class (Note: Unlike IISS categorization of PBFG, Jane's Fighting Ships considers this class of vessel PTFG or fast attack craft.) Peykaap II class Zolfaghar class
Patrol Boat Fast (+Torpedo)	15	Peykaap I class
Patrol Boat Fast	15 10 ε10	Kashdom II class Tir class Pashe class
Patrol Boat	ε20	Ghaem class

Type	In service	Class
Amphibious warfare units (5)
Landing Ship Tank	3	Hormoz 24 class
Landing Craft Tank	2	Hormoz 21 class
Logistic units (3)
Transport ship	3	Nasser class
Missile corvettes (5)
Missile corvette	1	Shahid Nazeri class

==== Speedboat fleet ====
In addition to the vessels mentioned above, IRGC operates a fleet of armed speedboats with displacement below 10 tonnes, the exact number of which is unknown. Back in 2007, the U.S. Office of Naval Intelligence estimated IRGC had a fleet of 1,000 speedboats that was growing. As of 2011, estimates ranged widely from "hundreds" to "several thousand". The number was put between 3,000 and 5,000 vessels according to most recent reports in 2020.

Classes of speedboats in the inventory include:

- Boghammar or Tareq class (IISS estimates c.40 operational in 2020)
- Zulfighar class air-defence boat
- Ashura class
- Cougar class
- FB class (RIB-33)
- Murce class
- Bahman class catamaran
- Gashti class
- Kuch class
- Bladerunner of Seraj class
- Heidar class
- Meead class
- Kajami class
- Gahjae class
- Tarlan class
- MIL 55 class
- MIL 40 class
- Zafar class

==== Ships ====
- Frigate
- IRIS Shahid Roudaki
- IRIS Shahid Mahdavi

==== Other vessels ====
- Al-Sabehat, swimmer delivery vehicle
- Bavar 2, wing-in-ground effect air vehicle

=== Current aircraft ===
Based on the IISS report, as of 2020 Iranian aircraft inventory includes:

Aircraft	Origin	Type	Variant	In service	Notes
Helicopters
Bell 206	United States	multi-role	AB-206	Unknown	
Mil Mi-17	Russia	transport	Mi-171 Hip	5	

==== UAV ====
- Shahed 136

=== Coastal anti-ship missiles ===
- Noor, based on the Chinese C-802 (+)
- Kowsar, based on the Chinese C-701 (+)
- Kowsar, based on the Chinese TL-10 (+)
- Nasr-1, based on the Chinese TL-6 (+)
- HY-2 Silkworm (+)
- Qader, medium-range anti-ship cruise missile
- Persian Gulf (Khalij Fars), Anti ship ballistic missile (ASBM) based on Fateh-110.
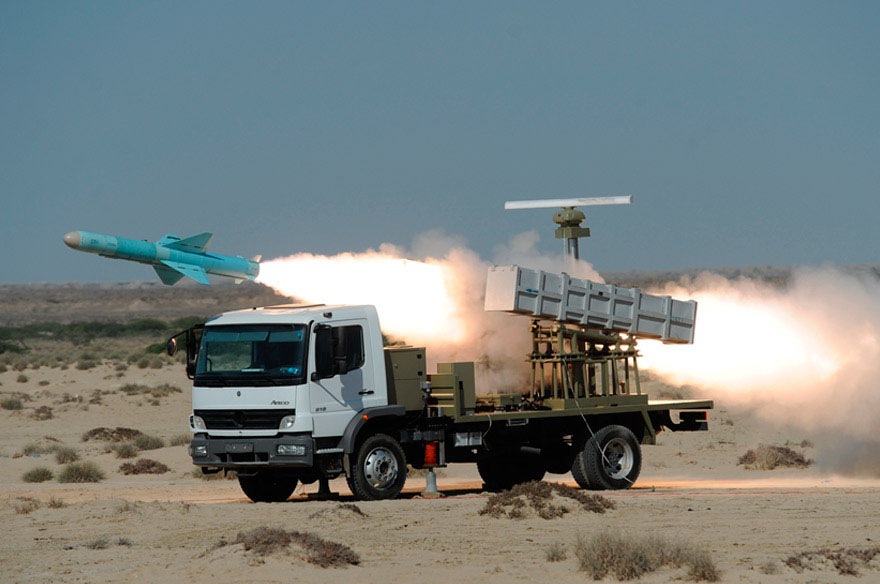
Firing Nasr-1 Missile from a truck launcher in Velayat-90 Naval Exercise

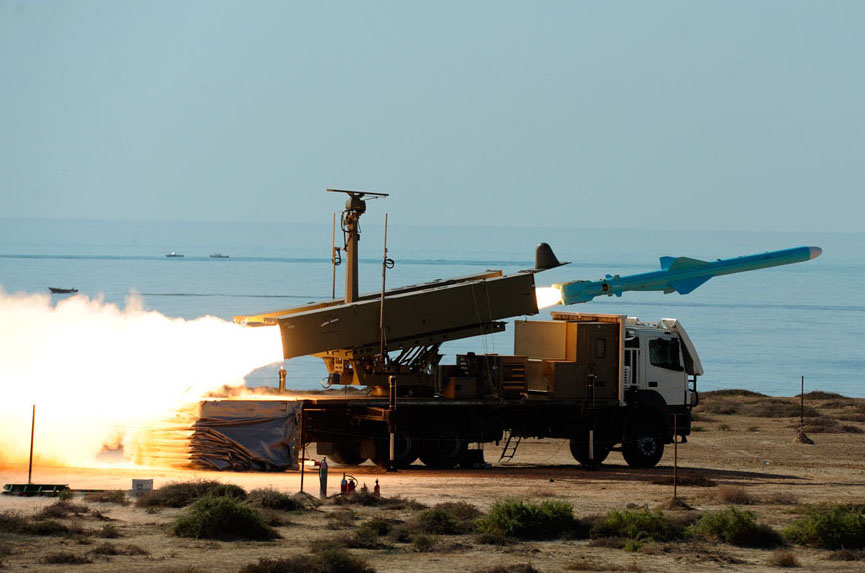
Qader

=== Torpedoes ===
- Hoot, can be launched from IRGCN speedboats and torpedoboats

== Commanders ==
No.	Portrait	Commander	Took office	Left office	Time in office	Ref.
1	Hossein Alaei	Hossein Alaei	17 September 1985	23 December 1990	5 years, 67 days	–
2	Ali Shamkhani	Commodore; Ali Shamkhani (1955–2026)	23 December 1990	27 August 1997	6 years, 247 days	
3	Ali Akbar Ahmadian	Commodore; Ali Akbar Ahmadian (born 1961)	27 August 1997	19 July 2000	2 years, 327 days	
4	Morteza Saffari	Commodore; Morteza Saffari	19 July 2000	3 May 2010	9 years, 288 days	
5	Ali Fadavi	Commodore; Ali Fadavi (born 1961)	3 May 2010	23 August 2018	8 years, 112 days	
6	Alireza Tangsiri †	Commodore; Alireza Tangsiri † (1962–2026)	23 August 2018	26 March 2026	7 years, 215 days	
7	Ali Azmaei	Commodore; Ali Azmaei	4 July 2026		139 days	

== See also ==
- List of navies
- List of marines and similar forces
- Ebrahim Zolfeghari
