= Fabio Buzzi =

Italian motorboat builder and racer

- Born: 28 January 1943; Lecco, Italy
- Died: 17 September 2019 (aged 76); Venice, Italy
- Cause of death: Boat crash
- Occupation: Founder of FB Design

Fabio Buzzi (28 January 1943 – 17 September 2019) was an Italian motorboat builder and racer.

== Biography ==
Fabio Buzzi was born in Lecco in 1943, from a family tied for centuries to the art of building and design.

His powerboat racing career started in 1960. He graduated in mechanical engineering in 1971 from the Polytechnic University of Turin, where he took a degree in mechanical engineering with a thesis on a self-constructed vehicle.

He built his first race boat in 1974, a three-point hydroplane called "Mostro" (Monster), the first boat ever built in Kevlar 49. He set a world speed record (176.676 km/h) with this boat in the class S4 in 1978.

On 17 September 2019, Buzzi, Luca Nicolini and Eric Hoorn were killed when their boat crashed against the San Nicoletto dam in Venice. Buzzi and his crew were attempting to establish a new Montecarlo to Venice record.

== FB Design ==
In 1971, Buzzi founded FB Design to build leisure, military and racing boats.

On board La Gran Argentina, a Fabio Buzzi-designed FB 55, Argentinian pilot Daniel Scioli was a three-time winner of the World Superboat USA Championship and captured 4 European titles. The boat's hull was modified in 2000 into a long-distance record setter. Scioli went on to set the Miami-Nassau-Miami record with an average speed of 100 mph.

Initially, the company's focus was on race boats. When offshore power boat racing declined in the late 1990s, the company used its experience in high-speed boat manufacturing to build military and fast patrol boats.

== Death ==
Fabio Buzzi, Luca Nicolini and Eric Hoorn were killed on 17 September 2019, while racing a powerboat in Italy. This occurred when Buzzi hit an artificial reef near the finish line just after setting the record for travelling from Monte Carlo to Venice.

Giampaolo Montavoci, the president of the Italian Offshore and Endurance Committee, confirmed the death of Buzzi and the two fatalities of his two assistants to the BBC. "The boat took off and flew 30 meters (almost 100 feet) through the air, landing on its stern on the other side of the causeway, where the victims died on impact," an official at Venice's port authority said, according to the Times of London. Buzzi, 76, a ten-time powerboat champion, apparently misjudged how much space he had available for his boat to enter the lagoon, and instead hit barriers installed to prevent flooding in Venice, a crash not uncommon in the crowded waters there, where many visiting cruise ships, motorboats and yachts may not be aware of the presence of the safety barriers under water.

== Pilot career ==
1960
First race (Pavia-Venice)

1963
First time Italian Champion (C.U. class)

1979
Speed World Record for diesel engines (191 Km/h)

1984
Offshore 3/6 lt class - UIM World Champion
Round Britain Race winner

1988
Offshore class 1 - UIM World Champion
Offshore class 1 - APBA World Champion

1992
Speed World Record for diesel engines (252 Km/h)

1994
Superboat - APBA World Champion
Cannonball Race (Miami-New York No-Stop) winner

1995
Superboat - APBA World Champion
A class - APBA World Champion
Superboat - APBA American Champion

1996
Superboat - APBA World Champion
B class - APBA World Champion

1997
A class - APBA World Champion

1999
Miami-Nassau-Miami Speed Record (87 kn average)

2001
Round Italy - Venice to Montecarlo at 20 Knots
Montecarlo to London at 33 Knots
Round Britain at 45 knots

2002
Winner of the Pavia-Venice Race at an average speed of 182 km/h.

2004
Winner of the Pavia-Venice Race at an average speed of 197 km/h.
Venice to Montecarlo record at an average speed of 46.9 knots (87 km/h).

2008
Cowes-Torquay-Cowes of 182 miles in 2h 18' 5' at an average speed of 91 mph.

2010
heat 1 "Cowes 100" of the UIM Marathon World Cup races.
heat 2 "Cowes-Torquay- Cowes" of the UIM Marathon World Cup races.

2012
New York-Bermuda Speed Record (684 nm run in 17h 06' at an average speed of 40 knots.)

2016
Montecarlo-Venice Speed record at the average speed in 22h 5' 43" at an average speed of 51.64 knots

2018
Diesel Powerboat World Speed record of 277.5km/h on Lake Como

2019
Montecarlo-Venice Speed record at the average speed in 18h 33' 30" at an average speed of 61.48 knots

== Winning and trophies as boat designer ==
- 52 World Offshore Championships;
- 22 European Offshore Championships;
- 27 Italian Offshore Championships;
- 40 World Speed Records;
- 7 The Harmsworth Trophy (1989 - 1993–1994–1995 - 2003 - 2004 - 2010);
