= Peykaap I-class torpedo boat =

Iranian class of torpedo boats

Peykaap I-class speedboat
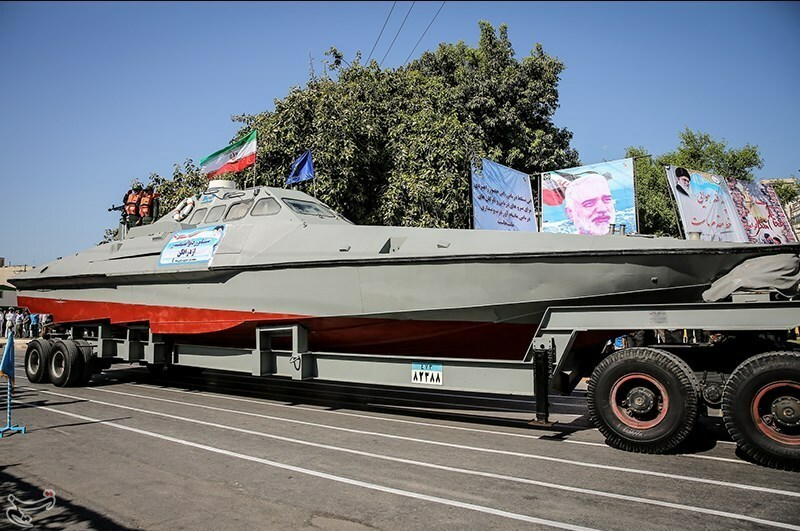

Class overview
- Operators: Navy of the Islamic Revolutionary Guard Corps
- In service: 2002–present

General characteristics
- Type: PT Boat
- Displacement: 14 tons
- Length: 17 m (55 ft 9 in)
- Beam: 3.75 m (12 ft 4 in)
- Draught: 0.7 m (2 ft 4 in)
- Installed power: Diesel
- Propulsion: 2 × diesel engines, 2,400 horsepower (1.8 MW)
- Speed: 52 knots (96 km/h)
- Complement: 3
- Armament: 1 × 12.7mm machine gun; 2 × 324mm torpedo tubes

Zoljenah (Persian: ذوالجناح, lit. 'two-winged', named after Zuljanah; also known as Peykaap I or IPS-16) is a class of fast torpedo boat operated by the Navy of the Islamic Revolutionary Guard Corps. It is described a stealth craft whose unusual armament suggests a "ship-disabling role".

As of 2014, the boats are made available for export.

== History ==
IPS-16 boats were purchased from North Korea in the early 2000s. The first six were reportedly delivered to Iran on 8 December 2002, aboard freighter Iran Meead. Iran then reverse engineered the boat and has been able to produce it domestically.

== Design ==
=== Dimensions and machinery ===
The ships have a standard displacement of 14 t (14 long tons). The class design is 17 m (56 ft) long, would have a beam of 3.75 m (12.3 ft) and a draft of 0.7 m (2 ft 4 in). It uses one surface piercing propeller, powered by two diesel engines. This system was designed to provide 2,400 horsepower (1.8 MW) for a top speed of 52 knots (96 km/h).

=== Armament ===
Zoljenah-class boats are equipped with a 12.7mm machine guns, but their primary armament is two single 324mm torpedo tubes.
