= Syrian Arab Navy (Ba'athist Syria) =

Maritime warfare branch of Syria's military

- البحرية العربية السورية
- Flag of the Syrian Navy under Ba'athist Syria
- Founded: August 29, 1950
- Disbanded: December 8, 2024 (de-facto, following the fall of the Assad regime)
- Country: Ba'athist Syria
- Type: Navy
- Role: Naval warfare
- Size: 4,000 active (in 2023); 2,500 reserve
- Garrison/HQ: Damascus, Syria
- Anniversaries: 29 August
- Equipment: 10 missile boats 6 patrol crafts 7 minesweepers 3 landing crafts 1 training ship
- Engagements: Yom Kippur War; First Battle of Latakia; Second Battle of Latakia; Syrian Civil War; Siege of Latakia

Commanders
- Notable commanders: Admiral Fadal Hussein; Vice Admiral Yasser al-Haffi

Aircraft flown
- Helicopter: Mil Mi-14, Kamov Ka-25, Kamov Ka-28

The Syrian Arab Navy (SyAN or SAN; Arabic: الْبَحْرِيَّةُ الْعَرَبِيَّةُ السُّورِيَّةُ, romanized: al-Baḥrīyah al-ʿArabīyah as-Sūrīyah) was the naval branch of the Syrian Arab Armed Forces during the rule of the Ba'ath Party in Syria. The main role of the Syrian Navy was to defend the country's coasts and ensure the security of the territorial waters of Syria. The Coastal Defense Forces and the Syrian Marines were attached to the Navy since the late 20th century. The Syrian Navy was relatively small, with only 4,000 sailors, in addition to 2,500 reservists and 1,500 marines, prior to the collapse of Ba'athist Syria in 2024. It was under the Syrian Army's Latakia regional command with its fleet based in the ports of Baniyas, Latakia, Minet el-Beida, and Tartus. It was the smallest part of the Syrian Arab Republic Armed Forces.

== History ==
=== Yom Kippur War ===
During the Yom Kippur War on 6–7 October 1973, the Syrian Arab Navy engaged for the first time in naval battle with Israeli ships in the Latakia area. It was the first battle in history in which both sides used sea-to-sea missile boats in combat.

The Israeli Navy had five missile boats launched from the port of Haifa towards the main positions of the Syrian fleet off the coast of Latakia. At first, the Israeli fleet encountered a small reconnaissance boat, and immediately sank it. Then the ships reached a naval minesweeper, which they attacked and immediately downed.

When the Israeli fleet advanced, it found the main forces of the Syrian fleet, the strongest and most modern militarily, which consisted of three missile boats (two Komar-class missile boats along with an Osa I-class missile boat, a K-123 torpedo boat and a T43-class minesweeper).

The Syrian boats launched their missiles from a long range that the Israeli ships could not launch from. However, the Israeli fleet had an anti-missile system that could mislead its radars and keep them away from their targets. In real combat however, they succeeded completely and all the missiles missed the target. As a result of the battle, all five Syrian ships participating in it were sunk, the Israelis did not suffer any losses.

On 29 August 1989, a Syrian missile boat sank the Maltese tanker Sunshield, which attempted to enter the prohibited zone.

=== Syrian Civil War ===
During the Syrian Civil War, opposition activists claimed that Syrian Navy warships supported a military attack by government forces against rebels in the city of Latakia. But the government denied that the city was bombed by sea.

==== Russian and Iranian support ====
In general, the Syrian Arab Navy did not have any modern equipment or weapons until 2006 (except for the OSA I and II anti-ship missile boats), in addition to its modest numbers of recruits compared to the 150-kilometre long Syrian coast. But since 2006, Russia and Iran began providing Syria with advanced weapons, providing it with heavy, short-range land-sea missiles, which are less expensive and more effective in battles than expensive torpedoes and boats, which are easily endangered during sea battles.

Among the types of missiles that Iran and Russia supplied to the Syrian Navy are the Styx anti-ship missiles, intended for use in close-range missile engagement with battleships and warships. In recent years, they have also acquired an unknown number of Sepal missiles, and their possession was not known until they appeared in modern combat tests of the Syrian Arab Army in late 2011.

The Syrian Navy also has a third type of missile, the Russian-made Yakhont missiles, which Syria purchased from Russia in a military deal in late 2011. These are long-range missiles that have given Syria a strategic military advantage at the Eastern Mediterranean. As for the fourth type of missiles supplied to the Syrian Navy, it was the C-802 anti-ship missile of Chinese origin, which is believed to have been supplied to Syria by Iran.

Prior to the fall of Damascus in 2024, the Syrian Navy had hoped to receive two Amur-1650 class submarines from Russia. In 2015 a group of Syrian military officials arrived in Moscow to discuss prospects for bilateral military and technical cooperation, including the pair of submarines. The Project-677 or Lada-class diesel submarine, whose export version is known as the Amur 1650, features a new anti-sonar coating for its hull, an extended cruising range, and advanced anti-ship and anti-submarine weaponry.

==== Israeli attack on Latakia ====
In late 2024, after the fall of the government of Bashar al-Assad in the Syrian Civil War, the Israeli Navy attacked Syrian ships berthed at the Port of Latakia, sinking six OSA II-class missile boats.

== Ranks ==
The rank insignia of commissioned officers.

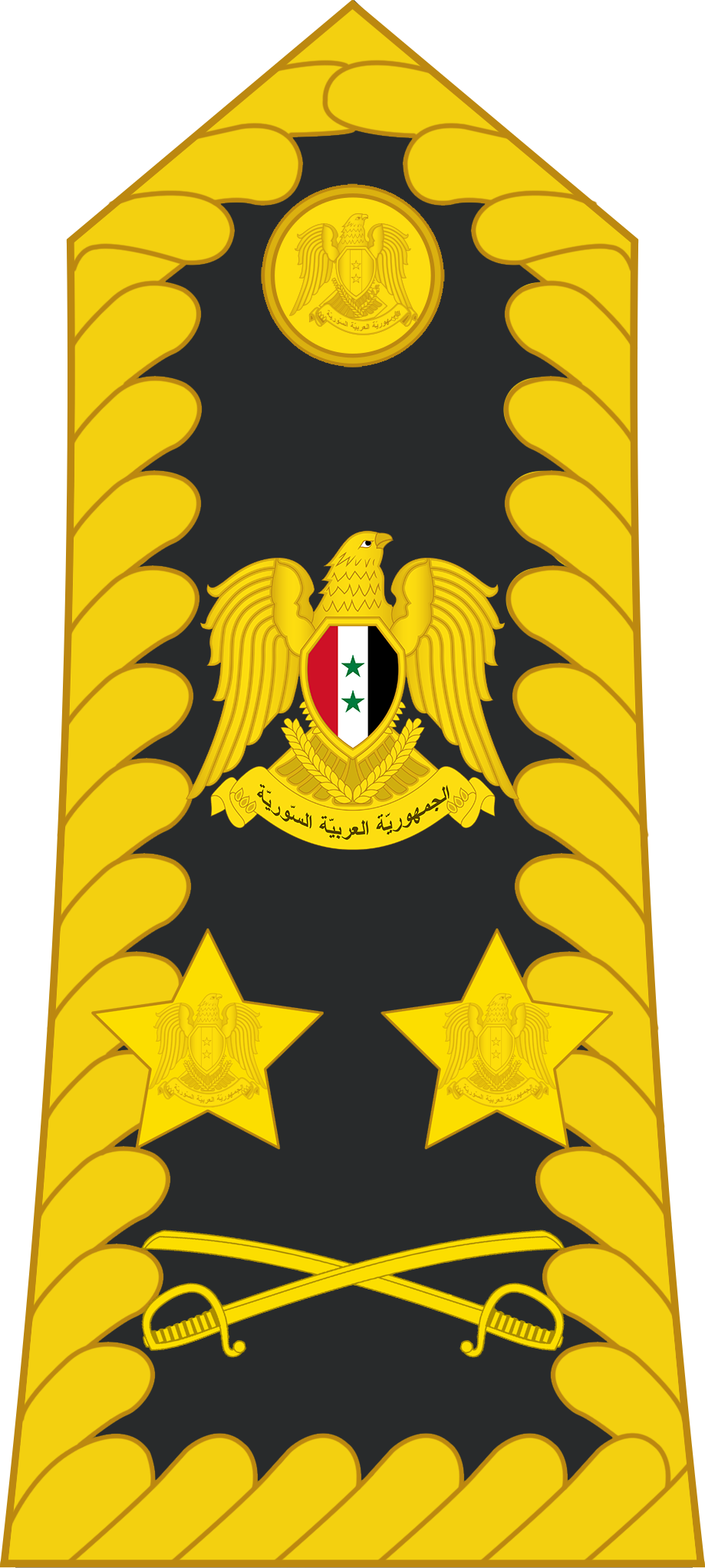
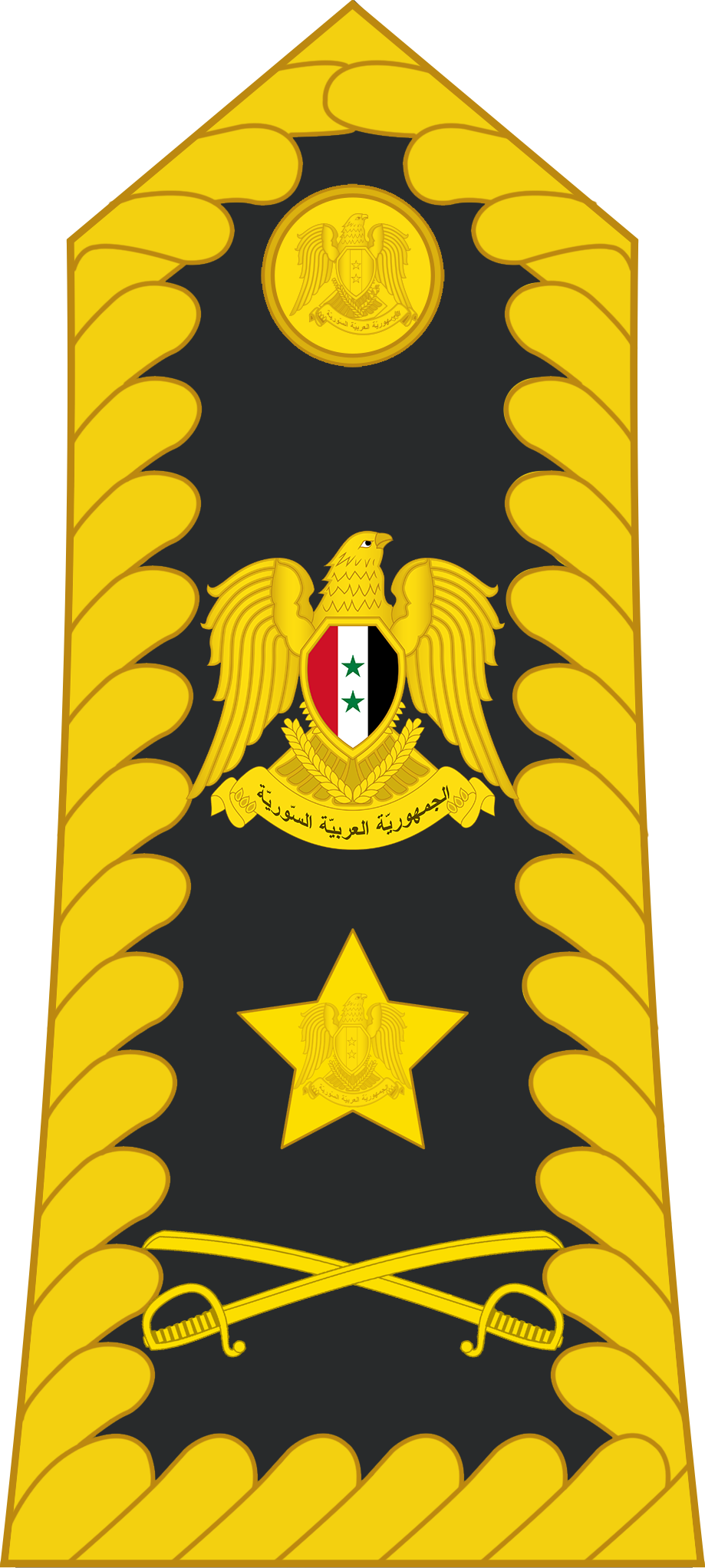
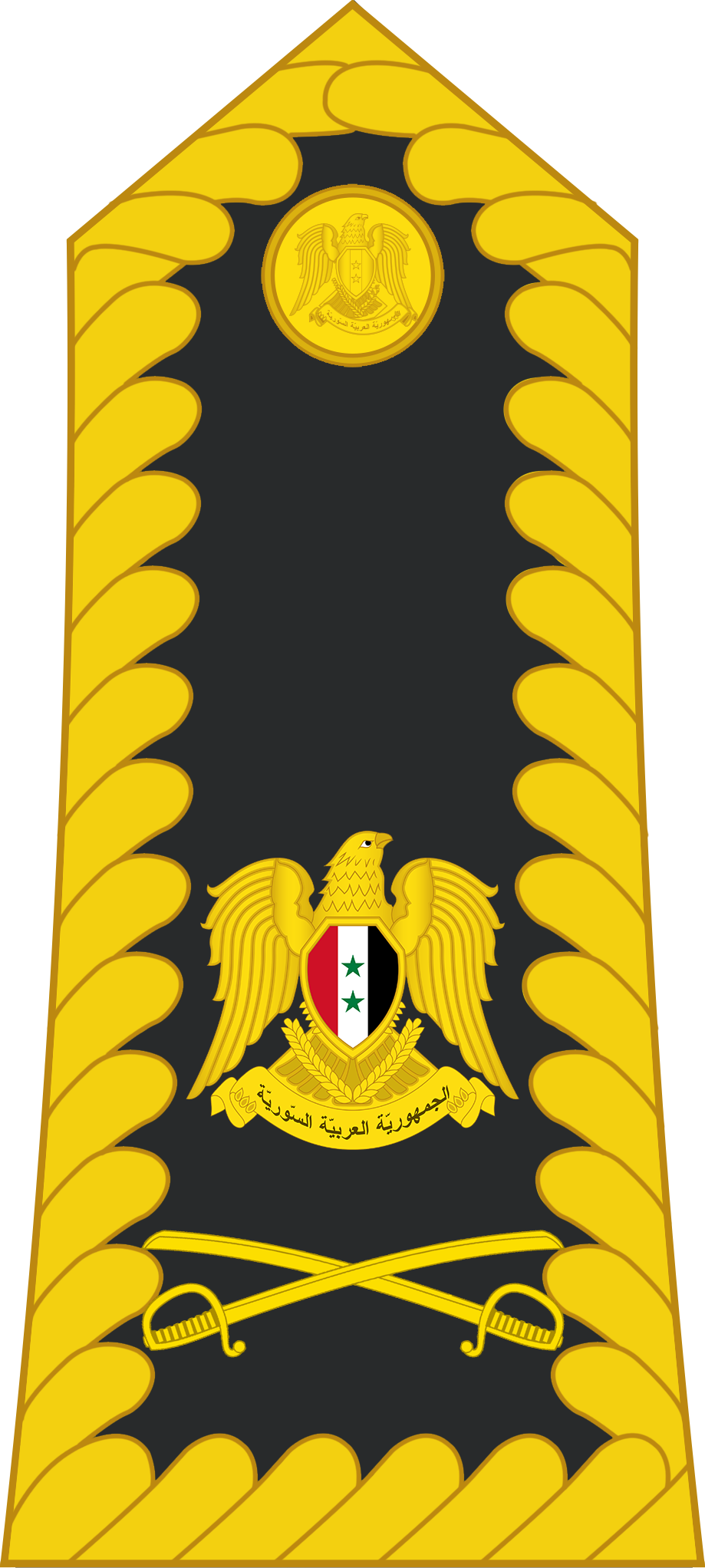
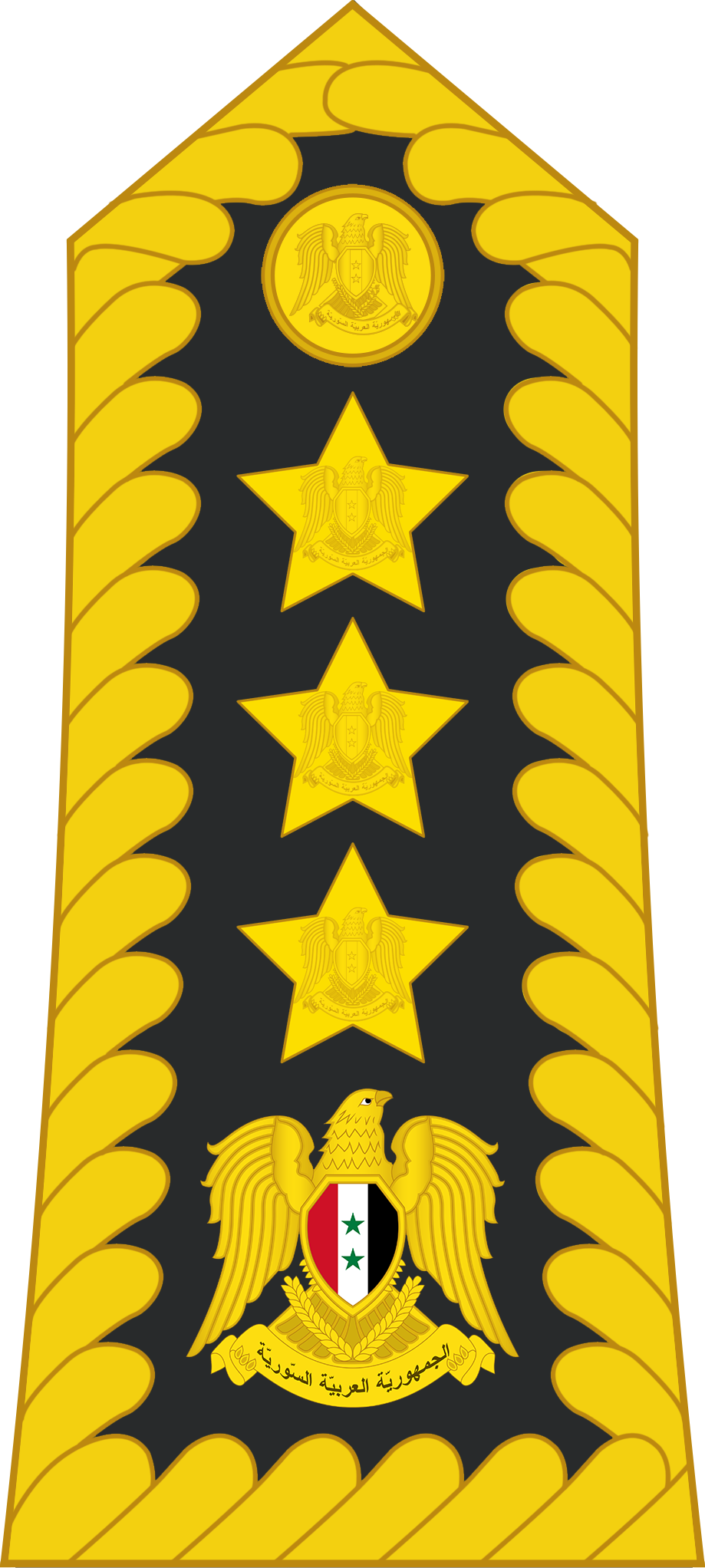
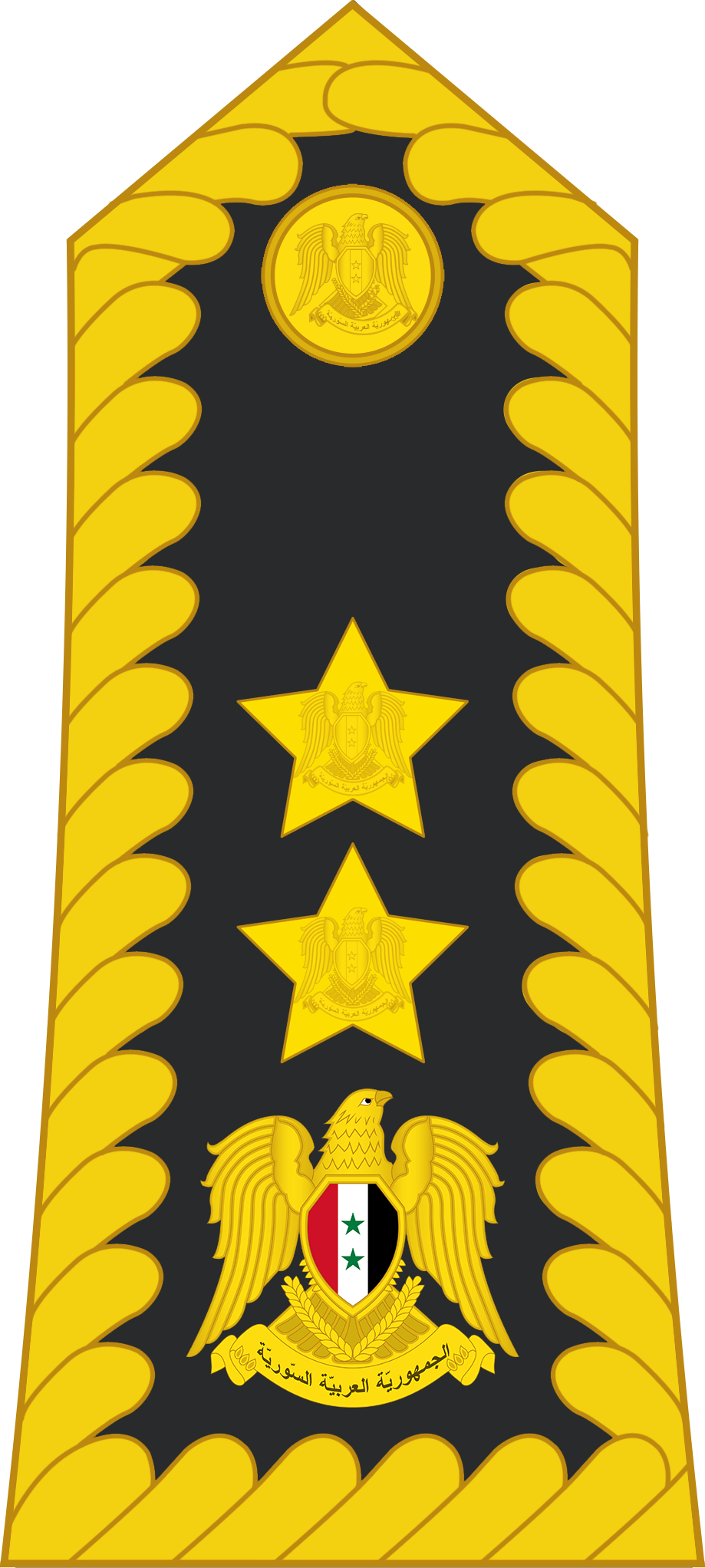
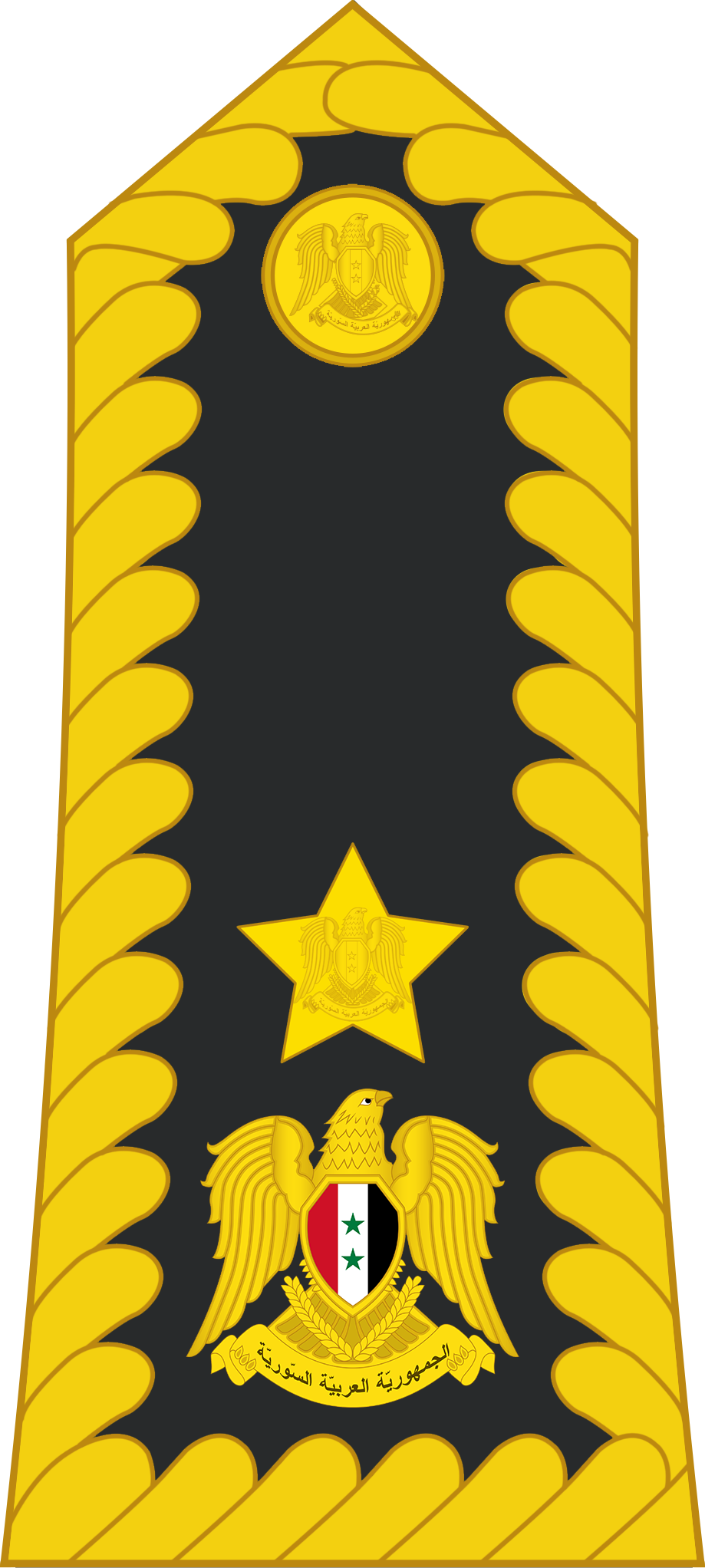
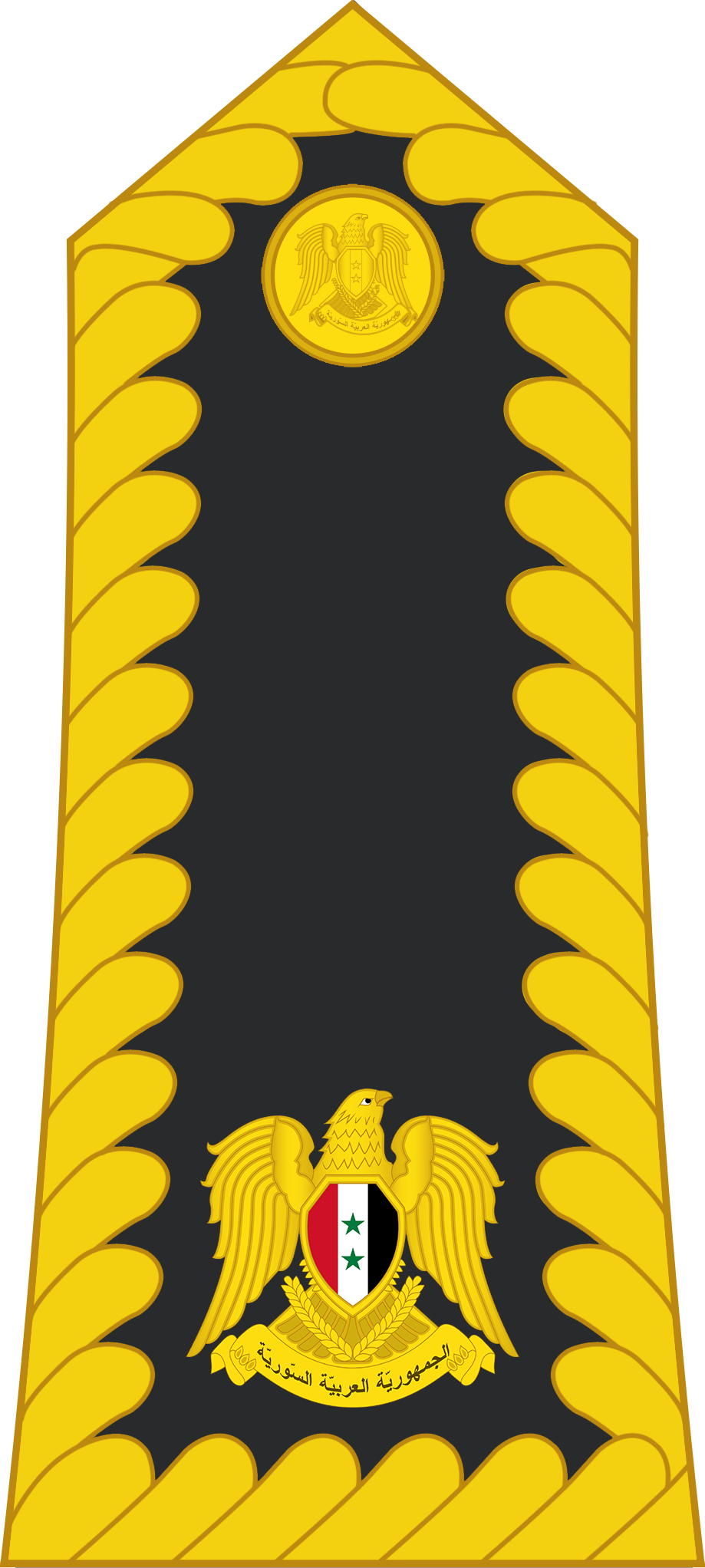
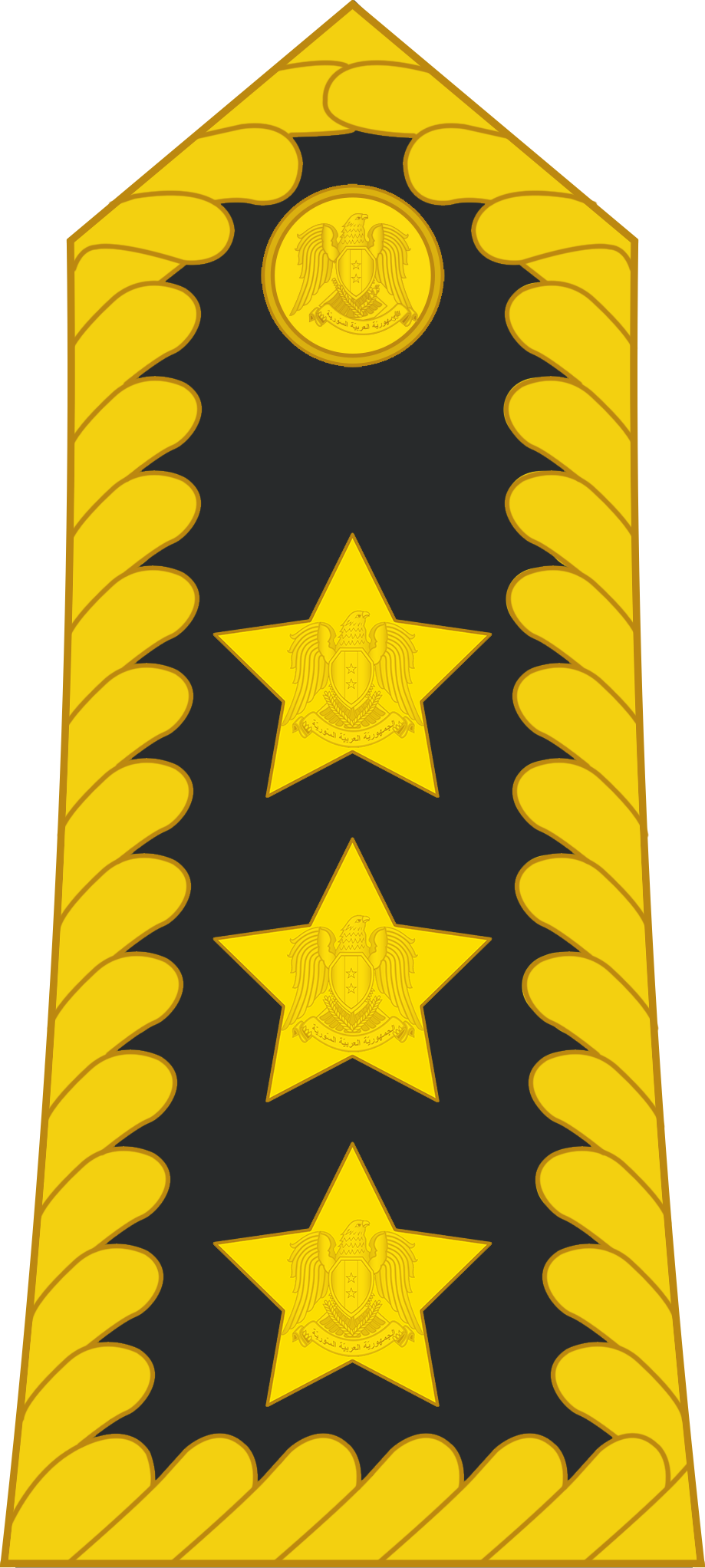
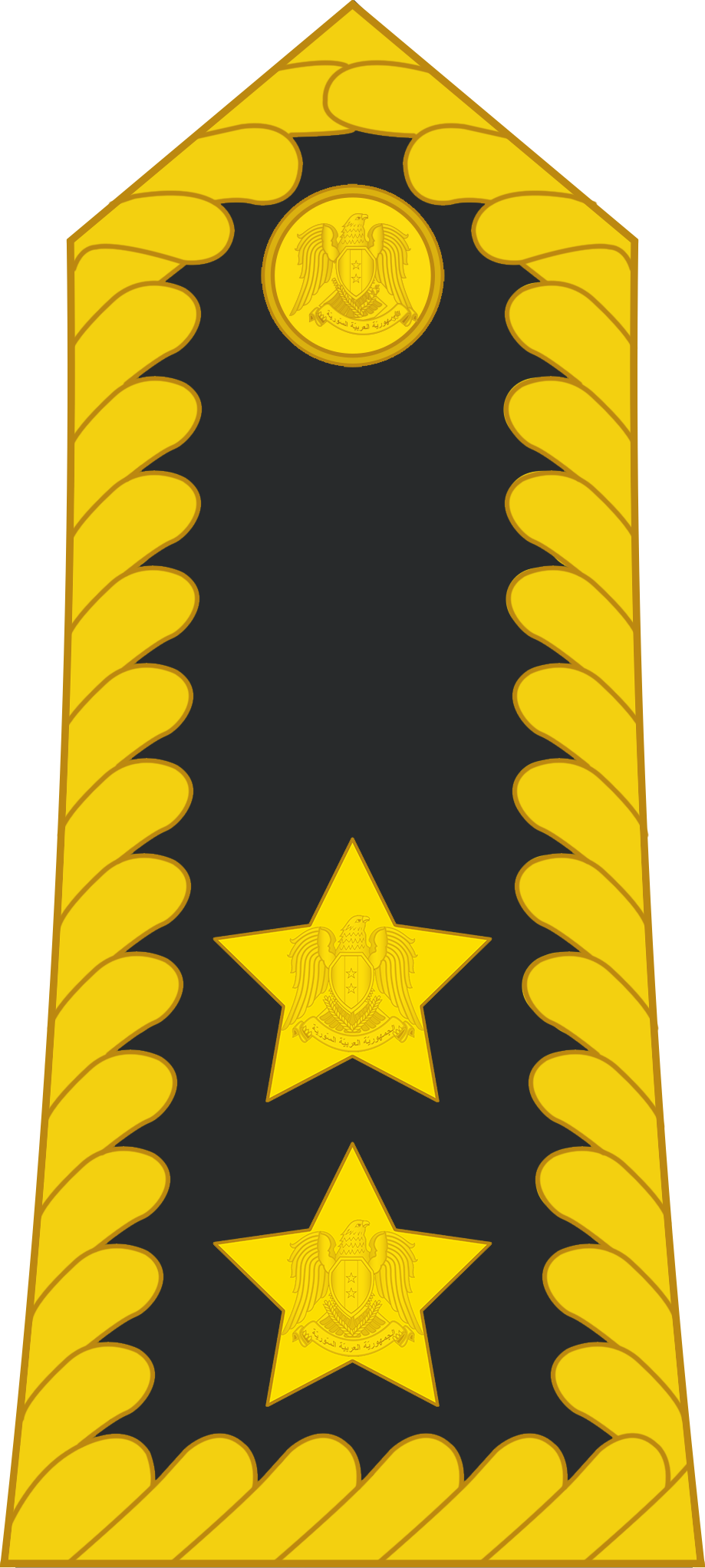
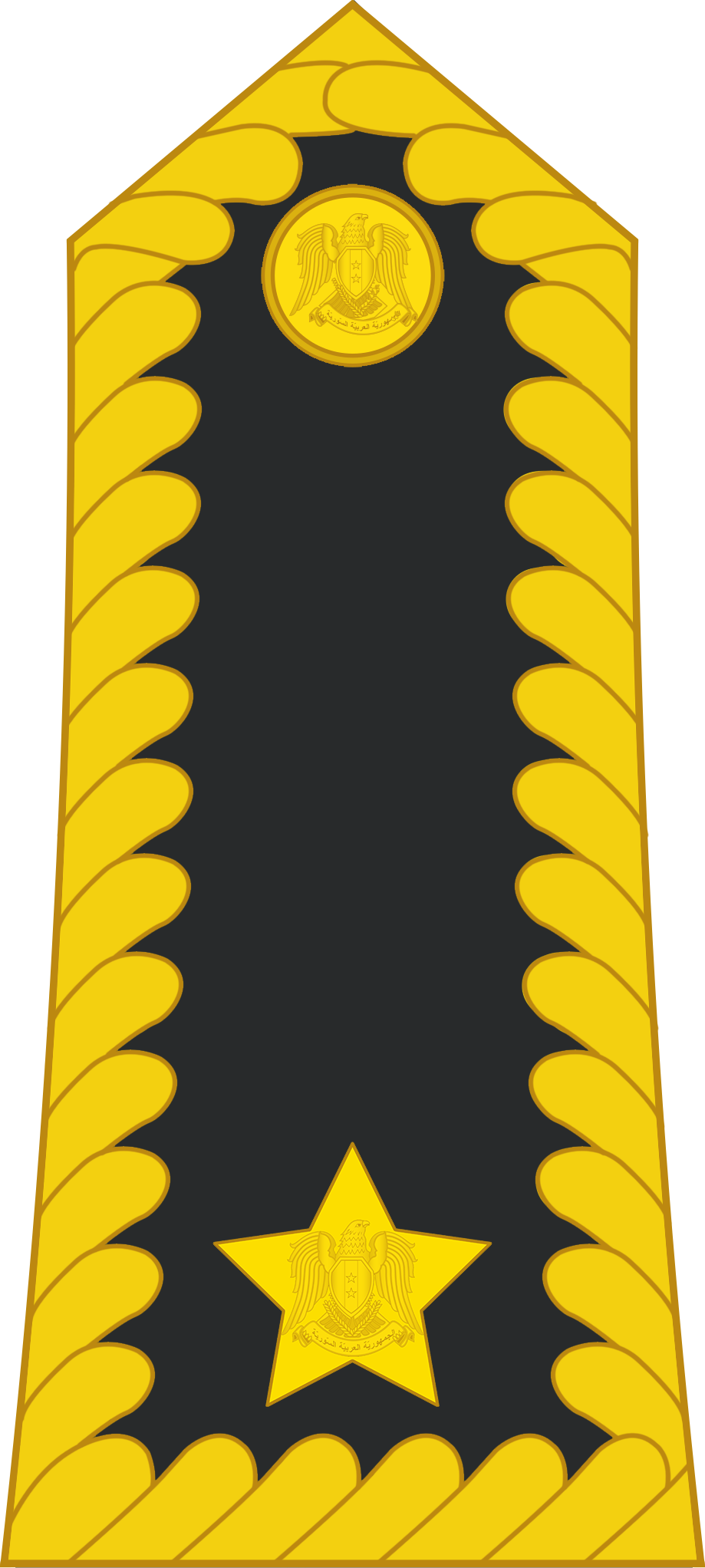
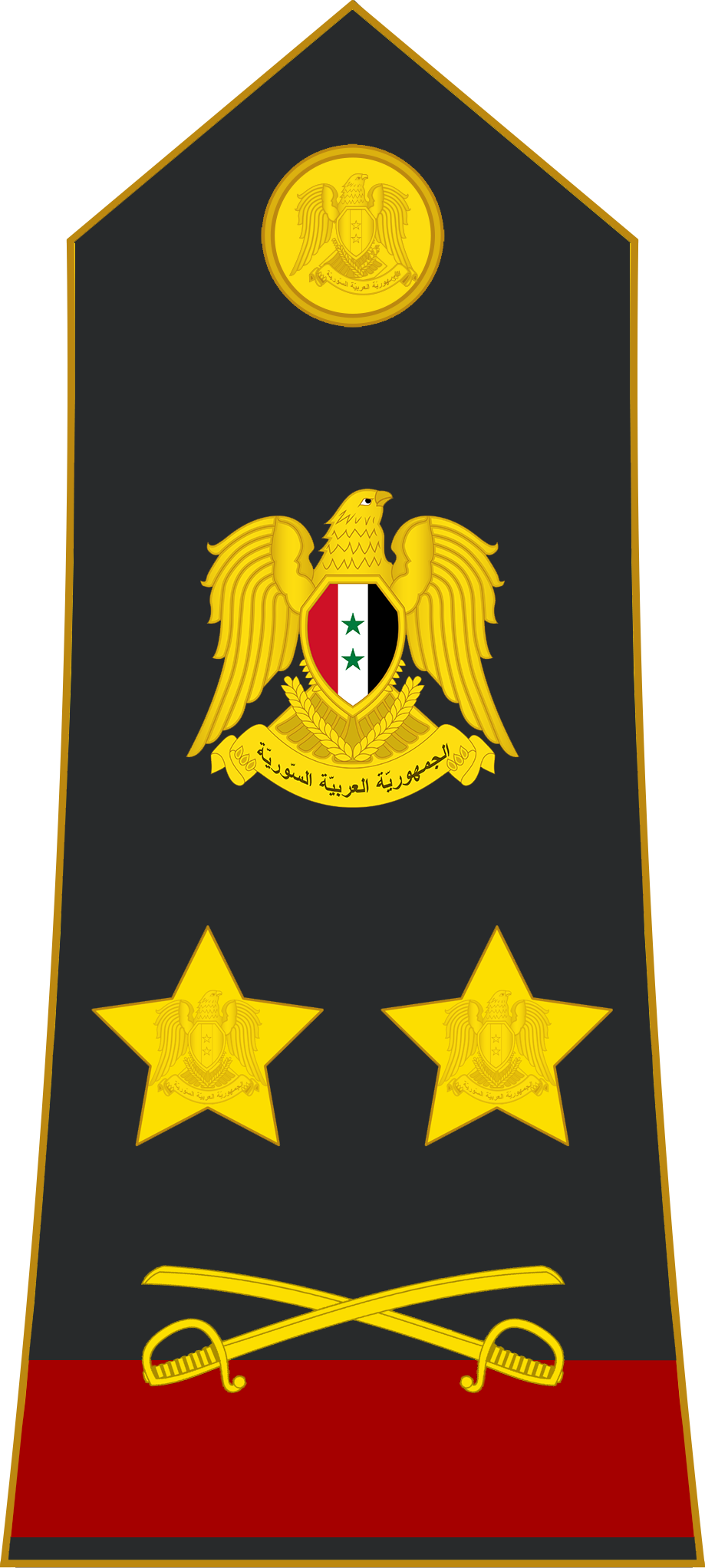
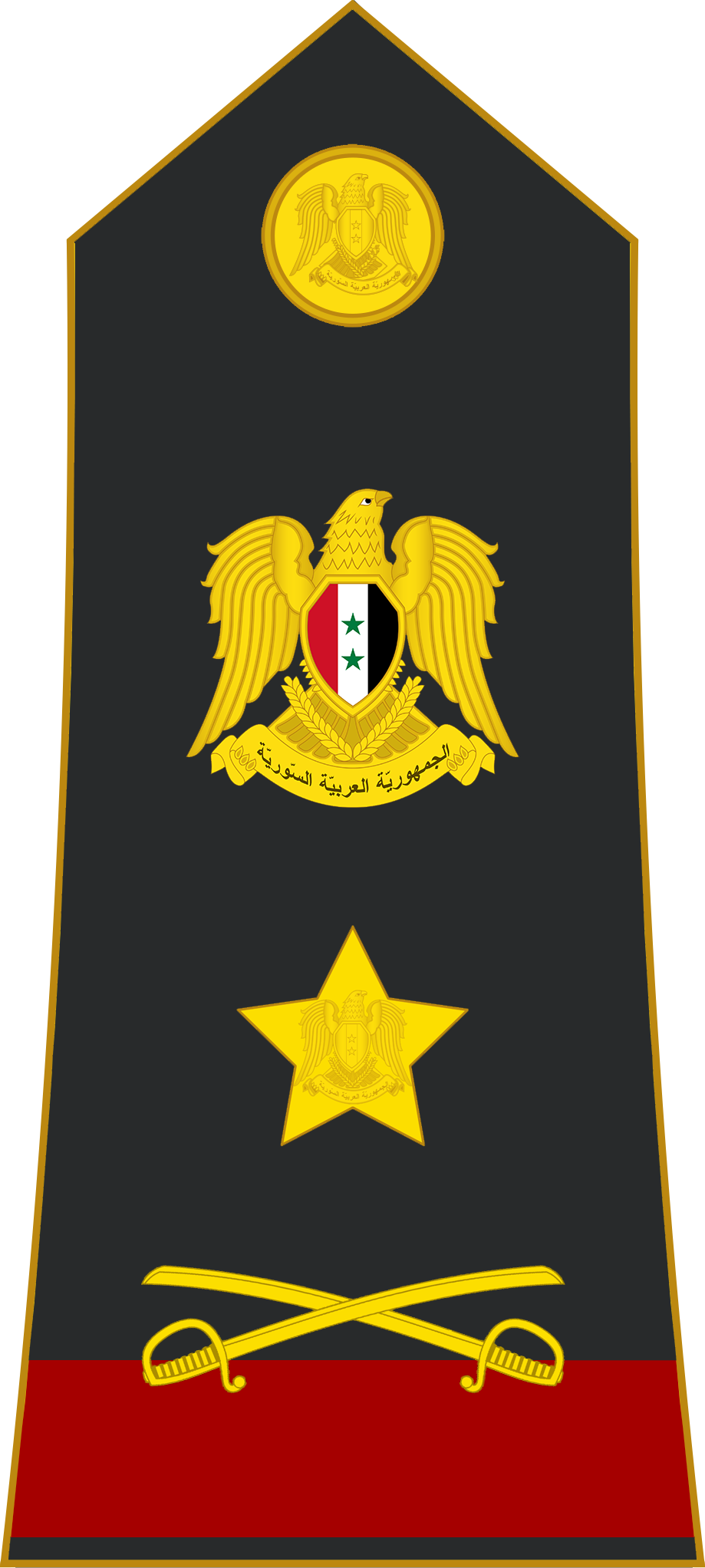
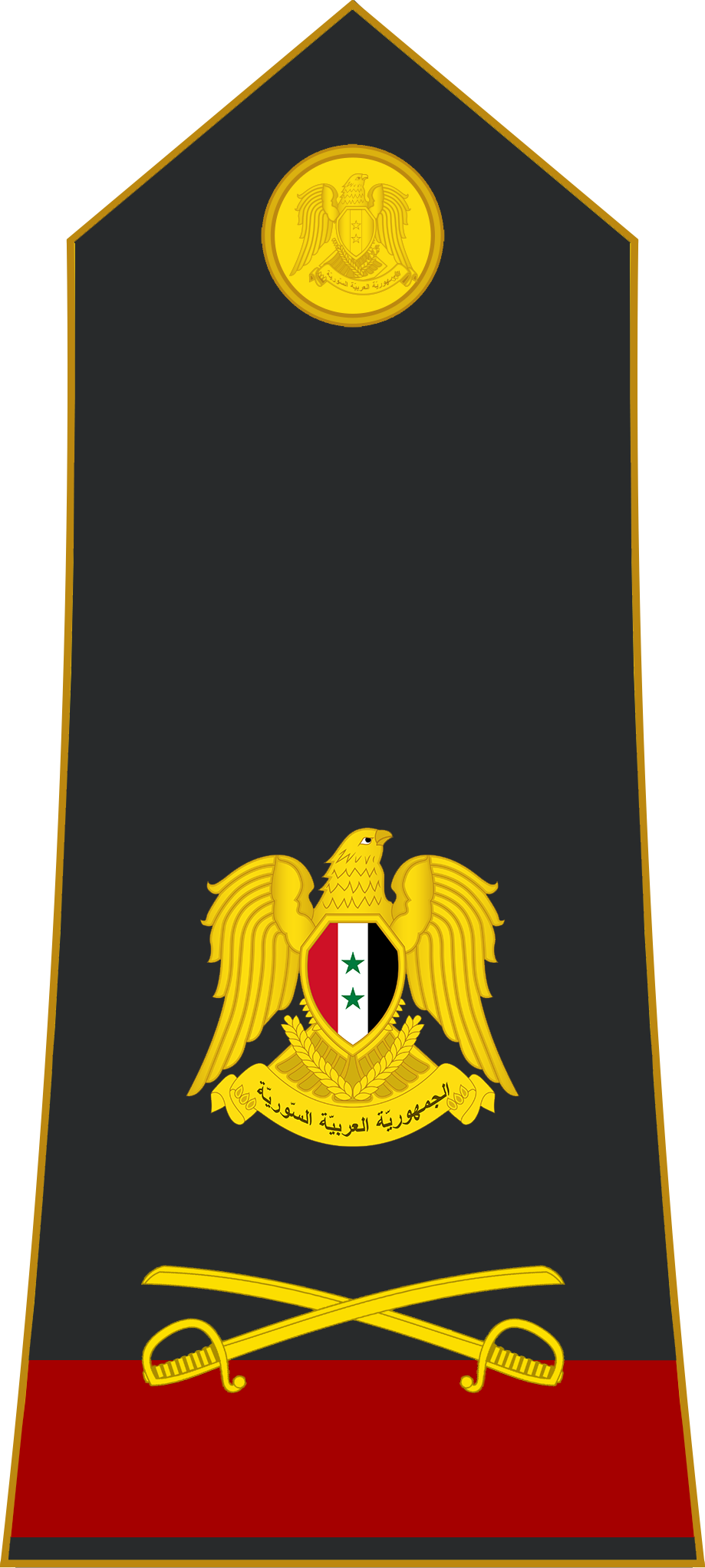
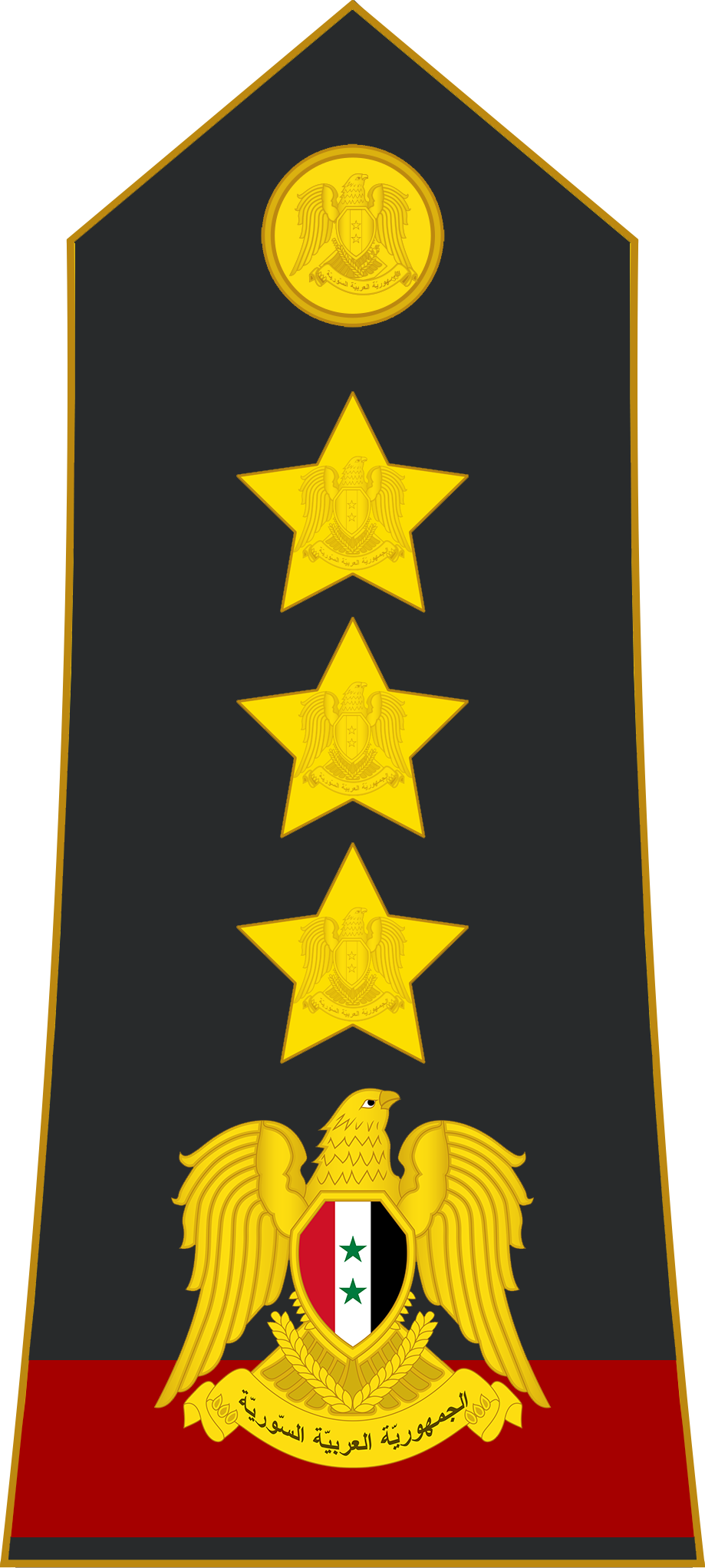
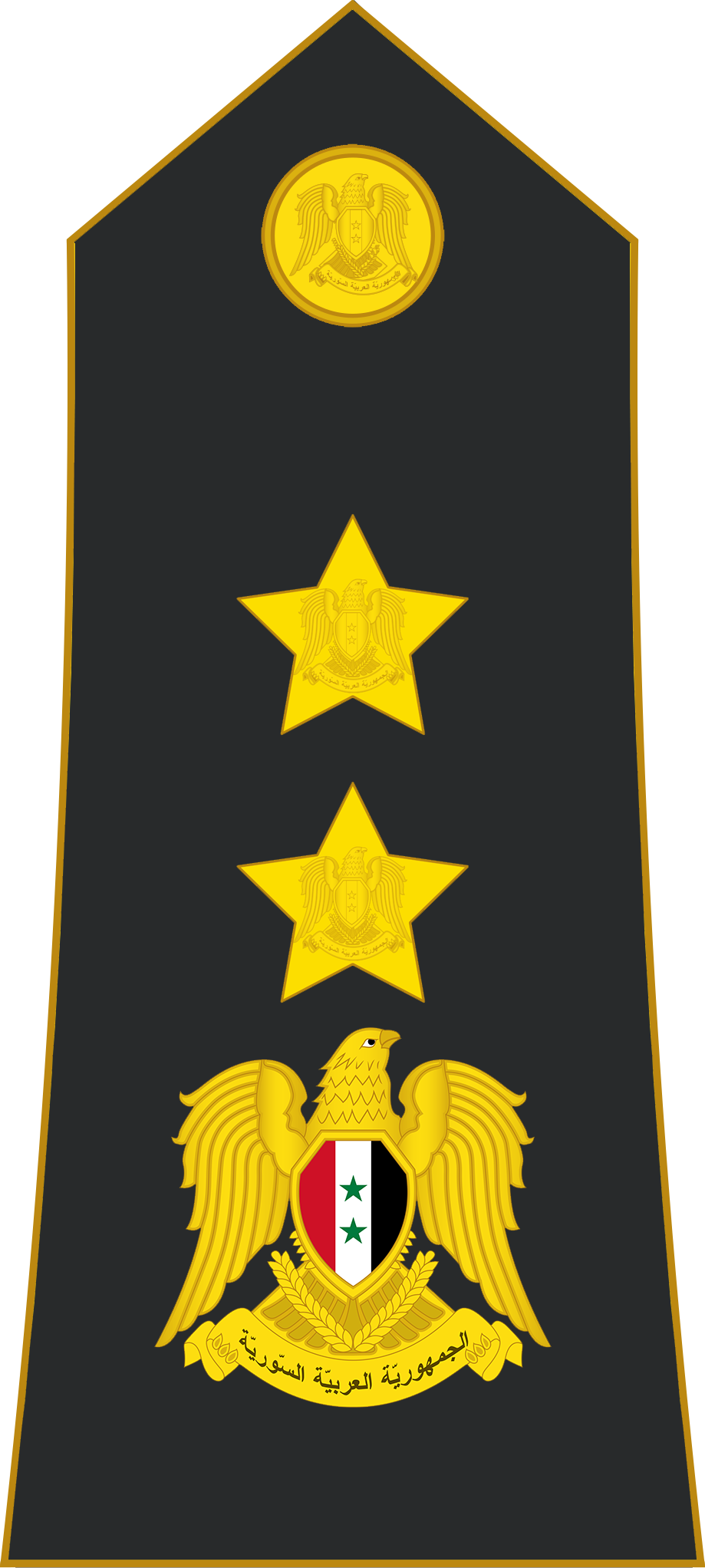
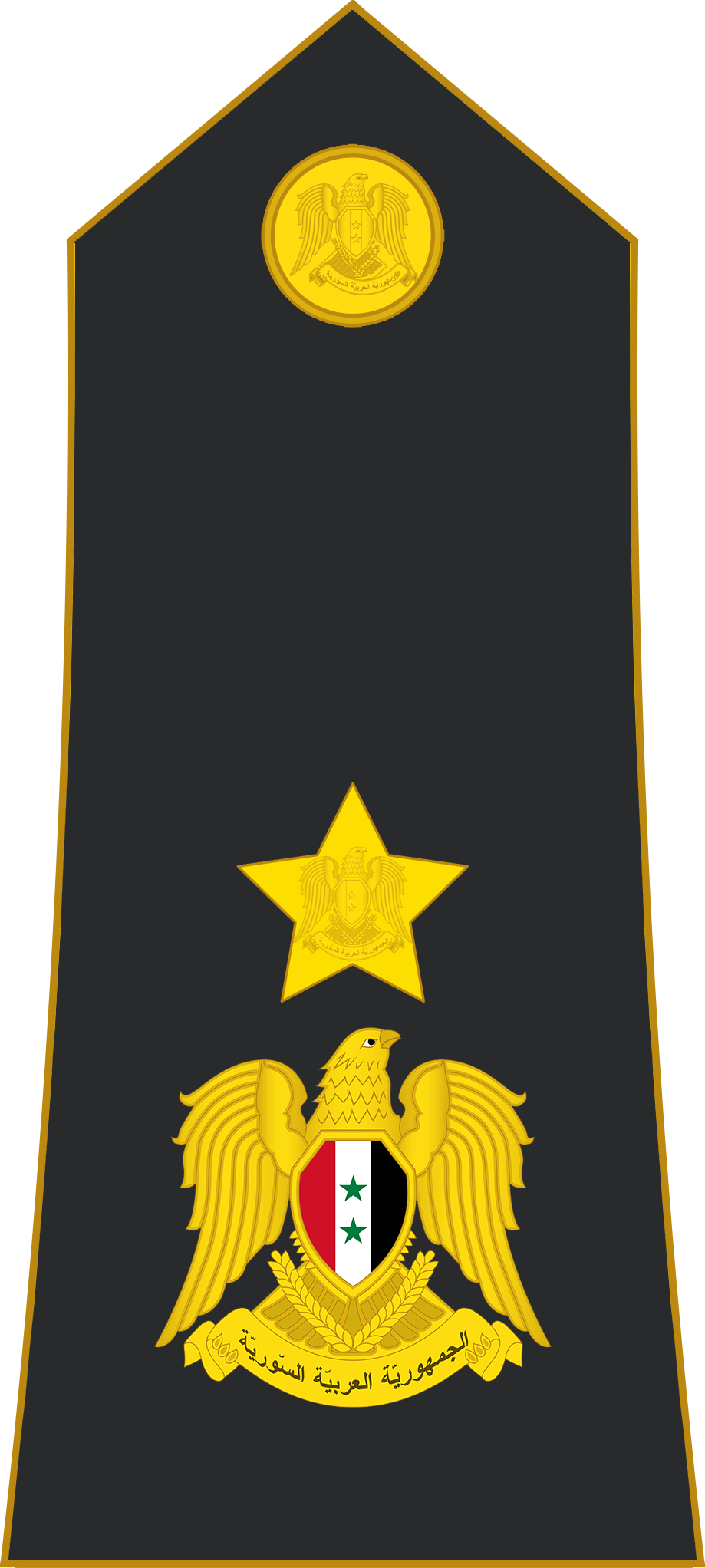
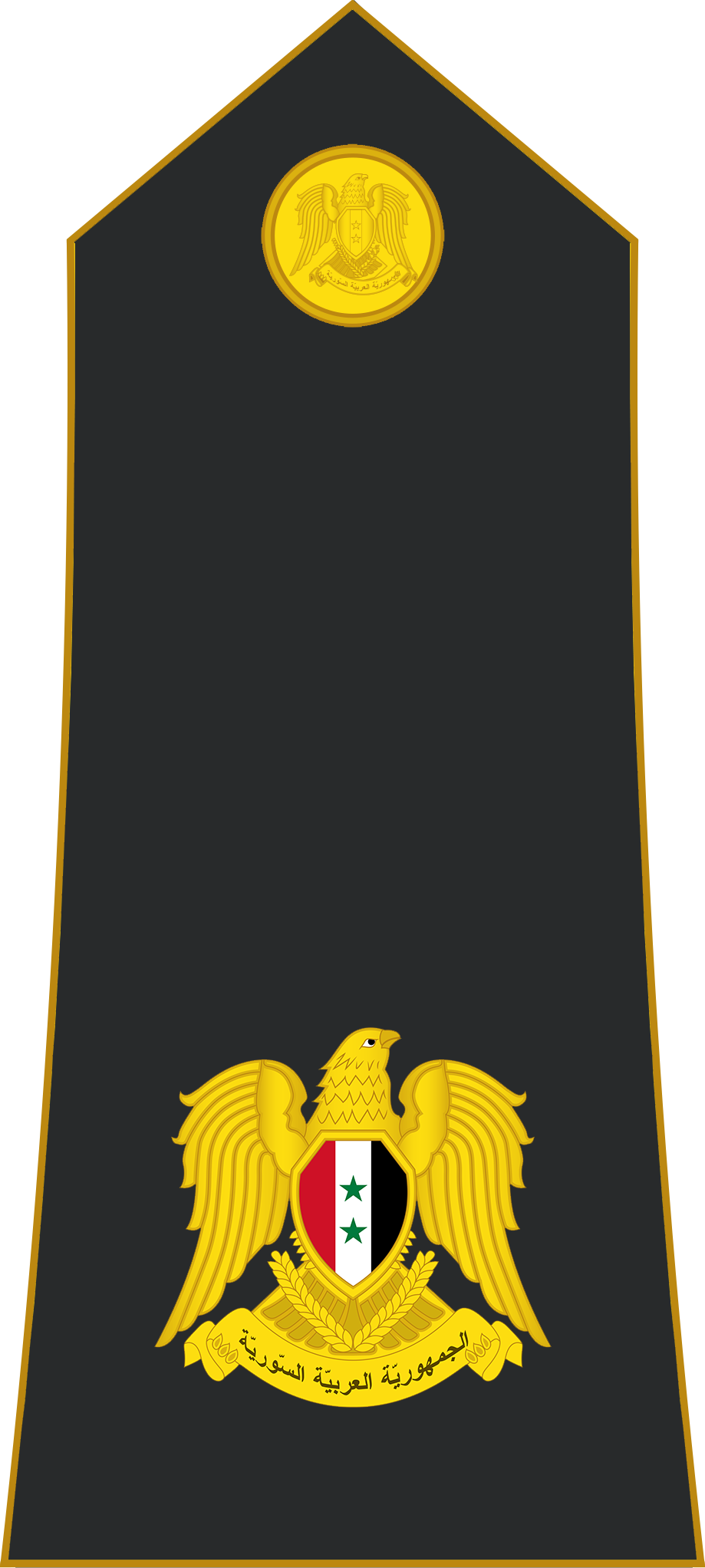
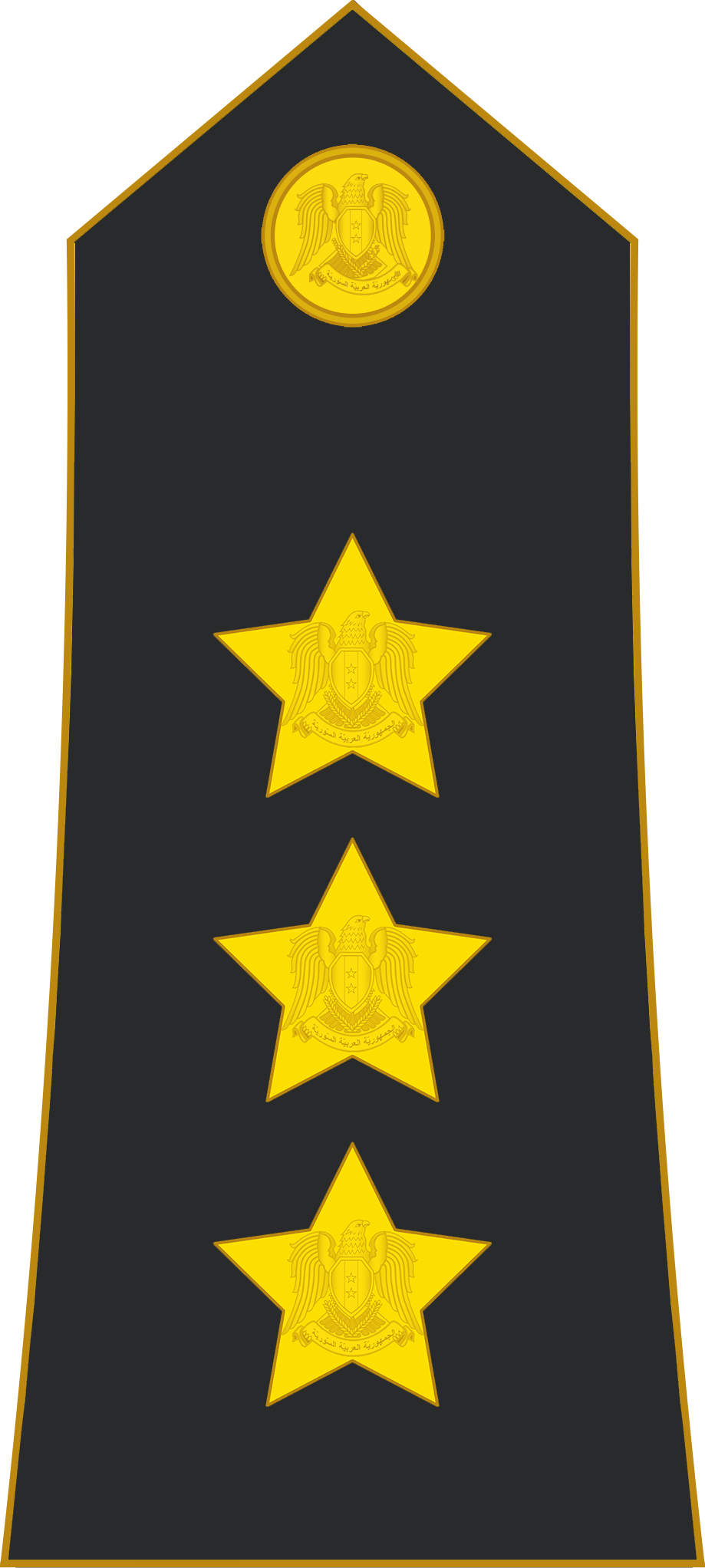
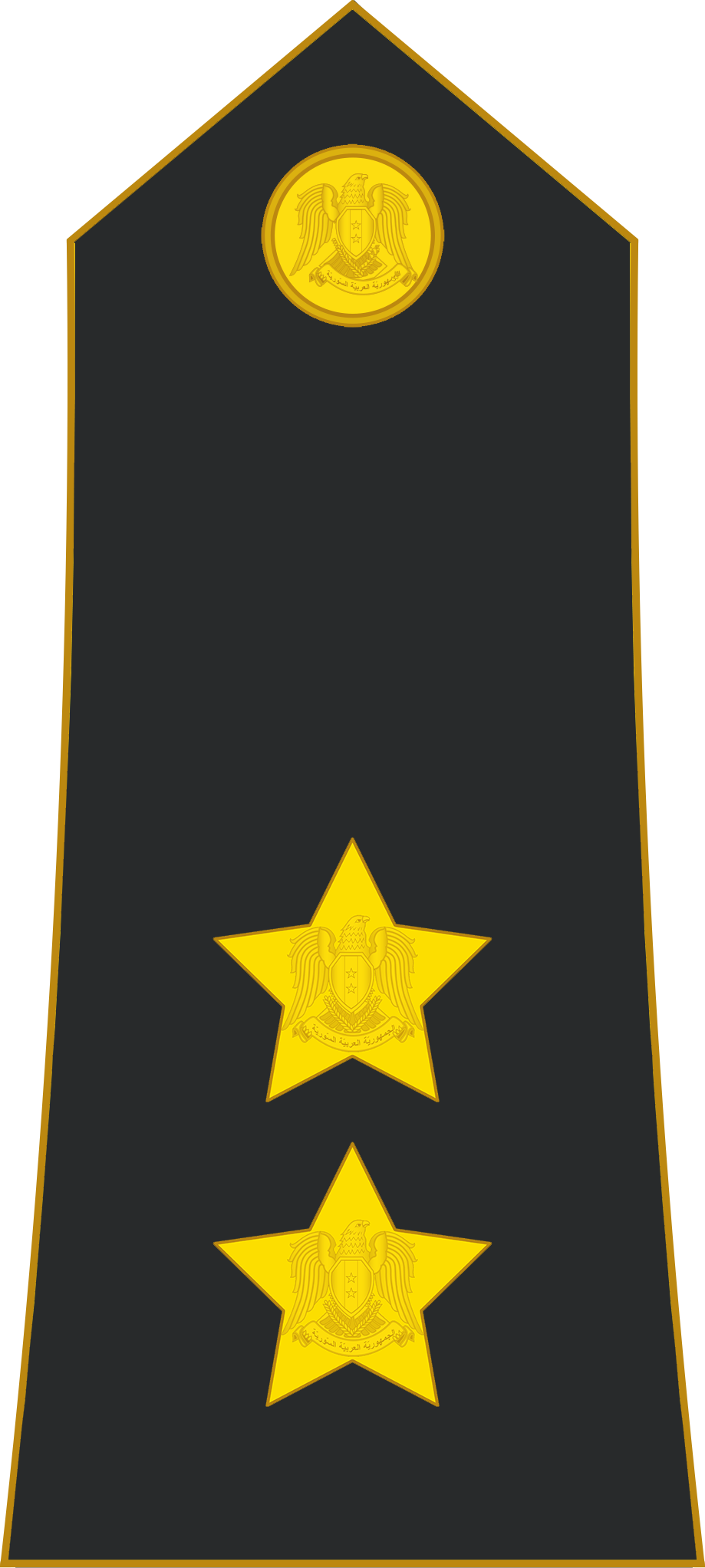
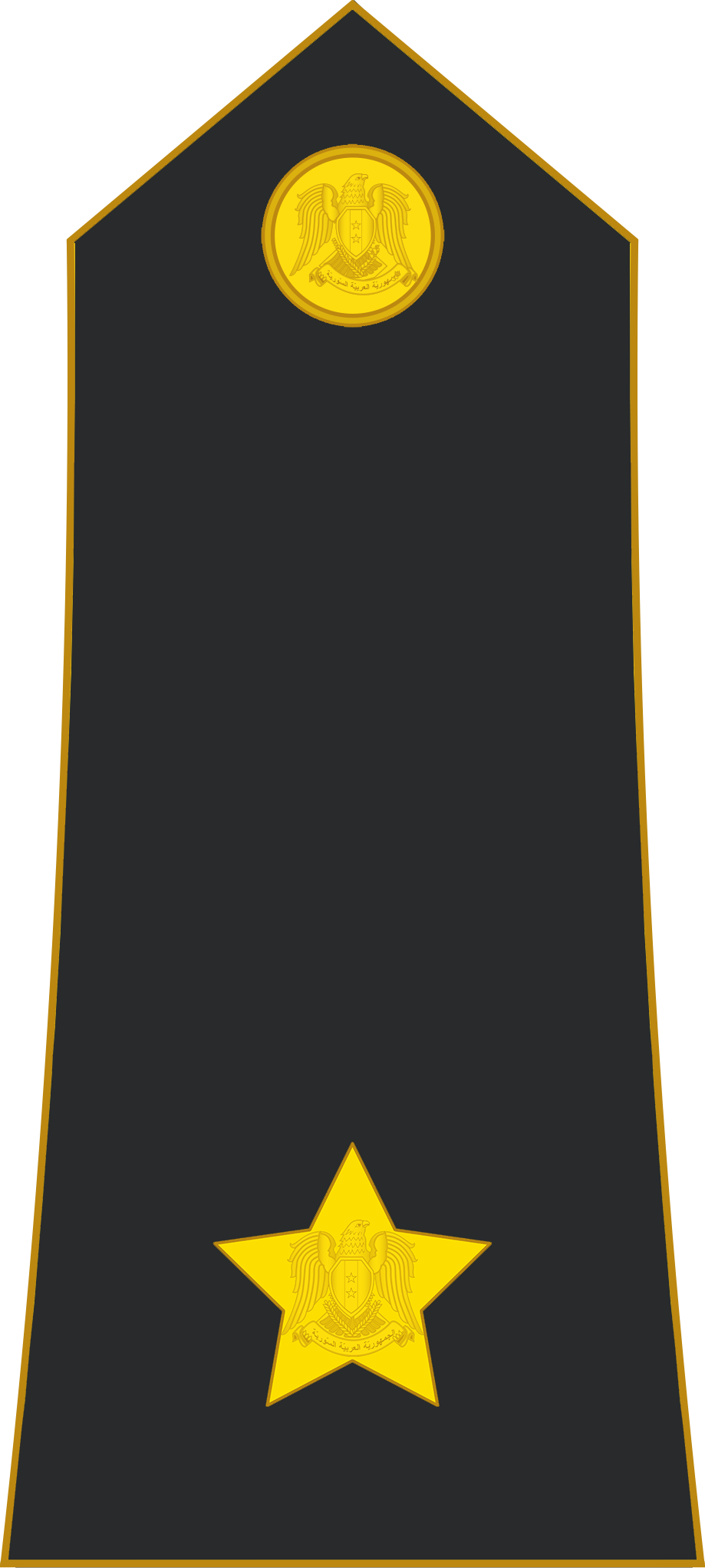
Rank group	General / flag officers					Senior officers			Junior officers
Rank	فريق	عماد أول	عماد	لواء	عميد	عقيد	مقدم	رائد	نقيب	ملازم أول	ملازم
Romanization	Fariq	Eimad 'awal	Eimad	Alliwa'	Amid	Aqid	Muqaddam	Ra'id	Naqib	Mulazim awwal	Mulazim
Navy full dress uniform (1980–2024)
Navy service dress uniform (1980–2024)

The rank insignia of non-commissioned officers and enlisted personnel.

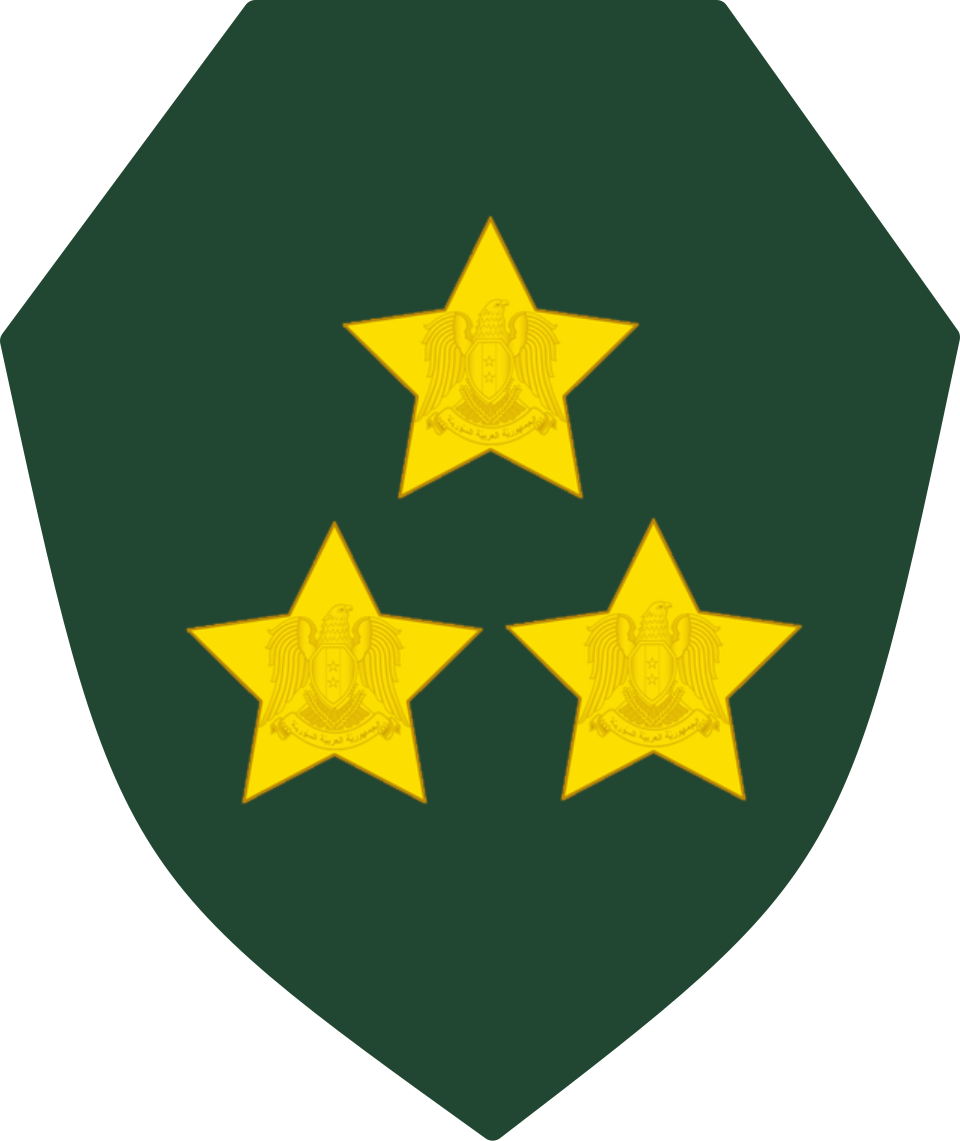
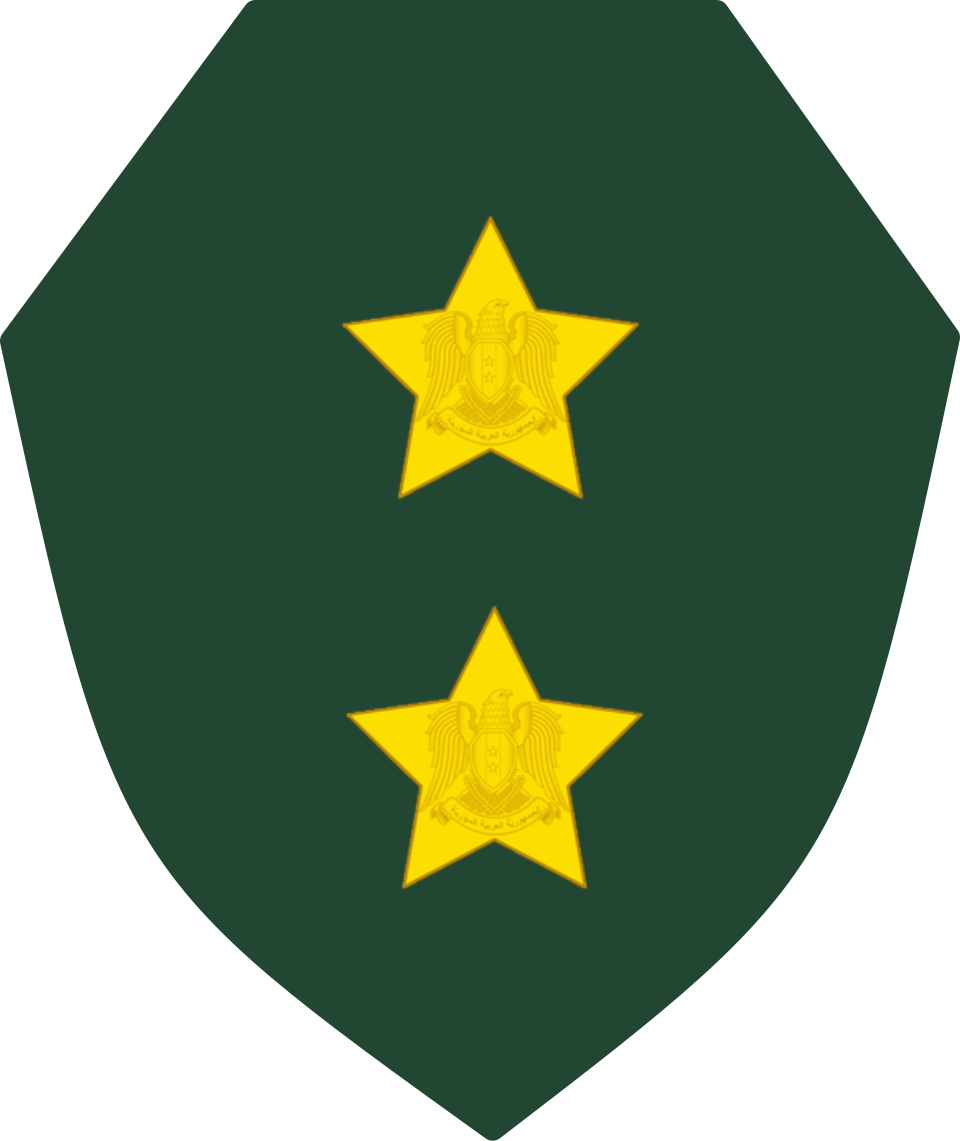
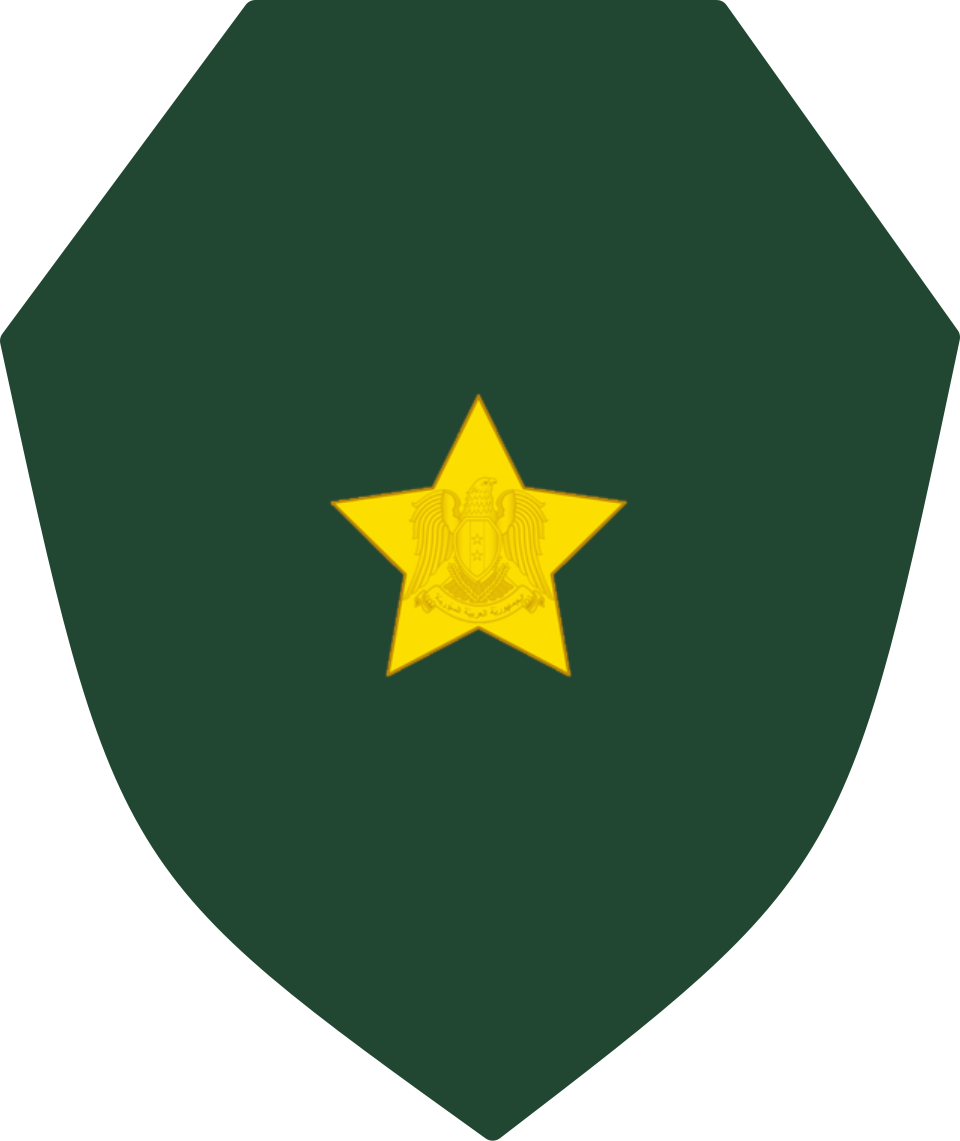
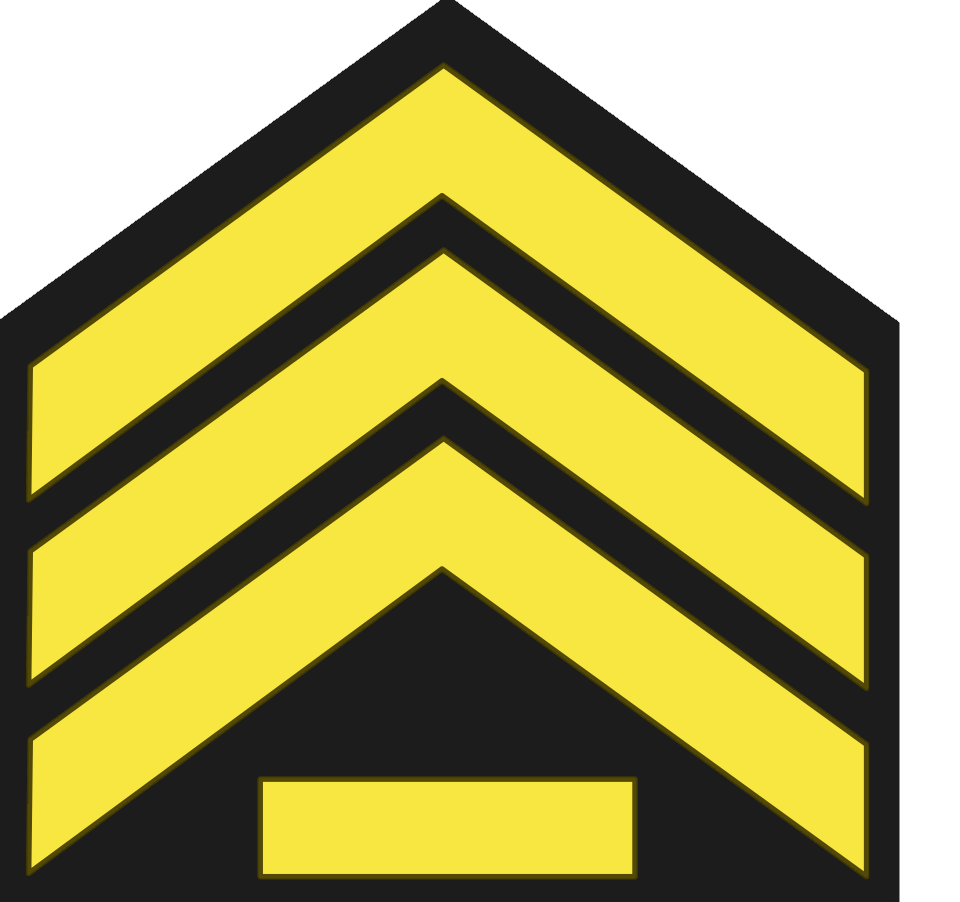
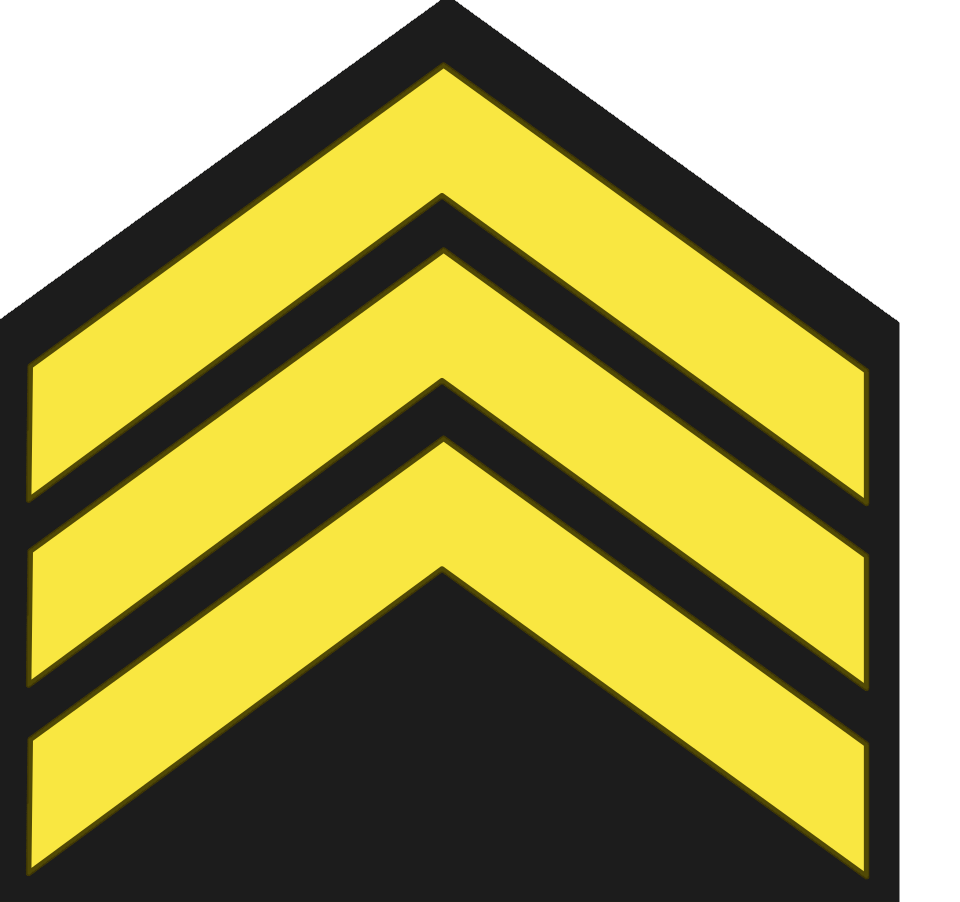
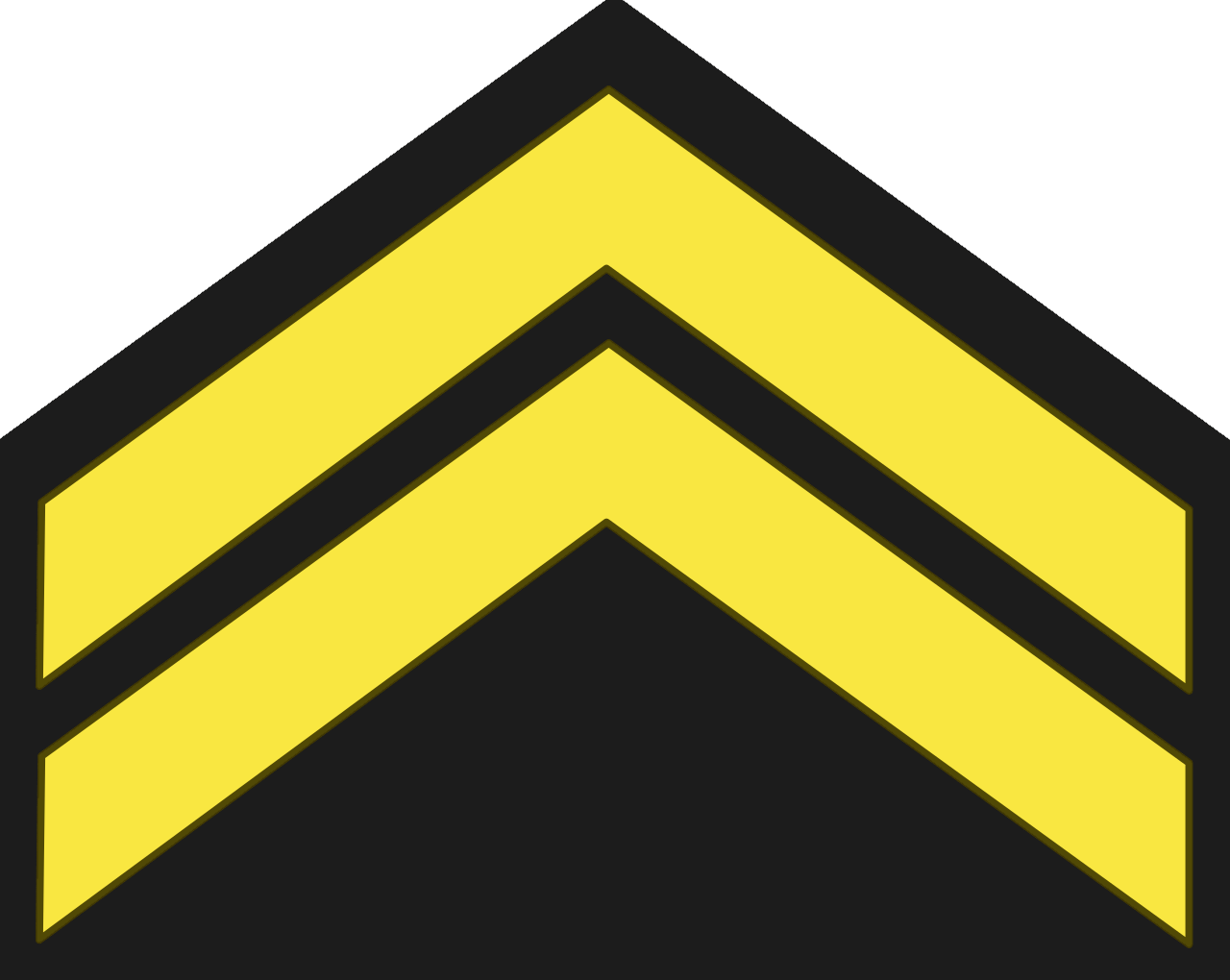
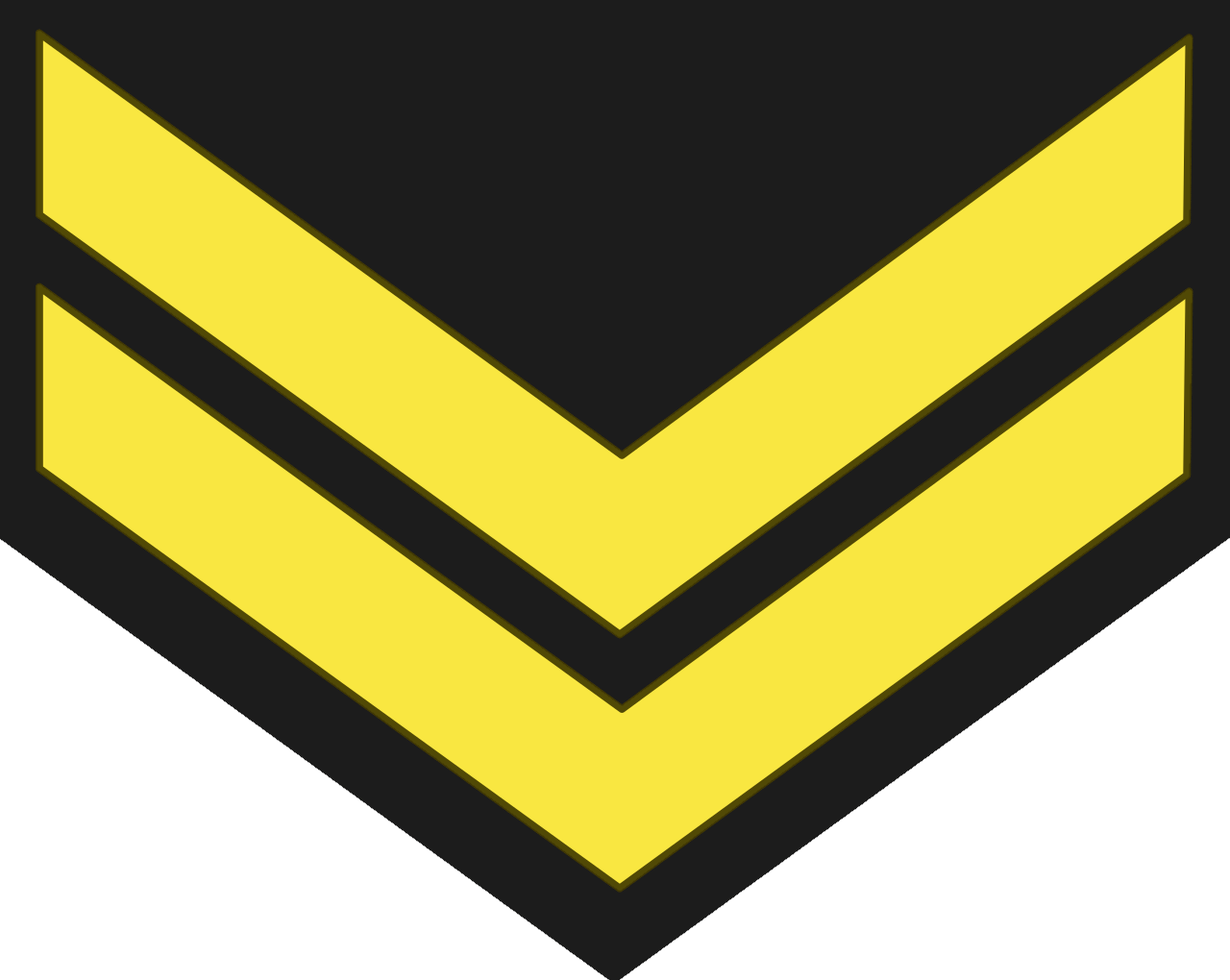
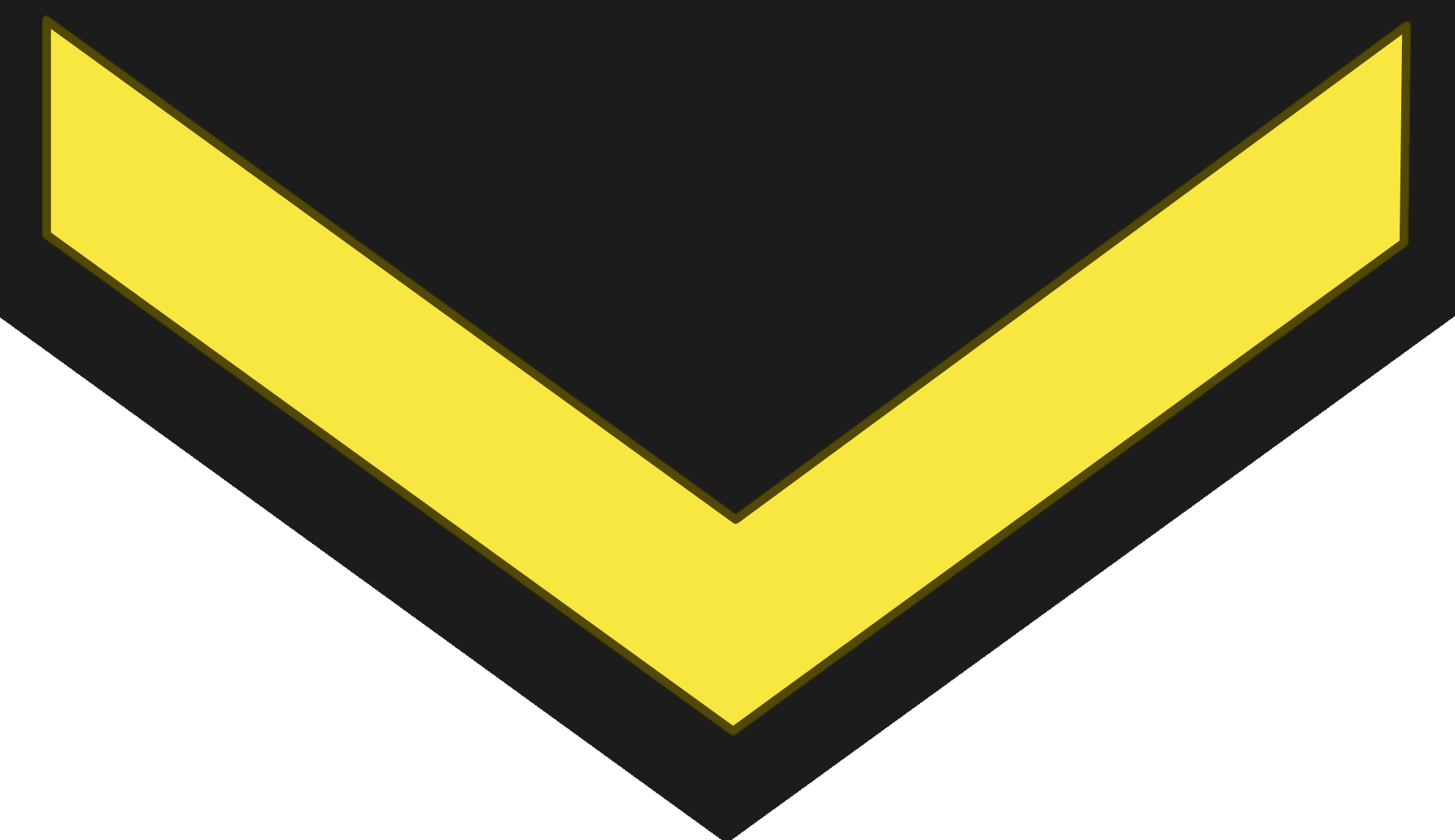
Rank group	Senior NCOs						Junior NCOs	Enlisted
Rank	مساعد أول	مساعد ثاني	مساعد	رقيب أول	رقيب ثاني	رقيب	عريف	جندي أول	جندي
Romanization	Musaeid 'awal	Musaeid thani	Musaeid	Raqib 'awal	Raqib thani	Raqib	Earif	Jundiun 'awal	Jundiun
Syrian Navy (1980–2024)									No insignia

== Personnel ==
The number of recruits for the Syrian Arab Navy reached 4,000 soldiers and 2,500 reservists since the year 1985, and this number did not change in the census in 2002. The proportion of navy personnel from the total number of recruits Syrian Arab Army was 1.4% in the year 1993. This rose to 1.9% of the total armed forces personnel in the year 2000.

== Structure ==
The Syrian Arab Navy consisted of the navy, coastal defense and naval aviation forces.

=== Marines ===
The Syrian Marines followed the forces of naval infantry, consisting of about 1,500 conscripts, whose primary role was to protect the three military naval bases in the country, which are divided into three units, each of which was to protect one of the bases. These Marines had three amphibious assault ships, each of which can carry 100 soldiers and five tanks.

In general, the Syrian Marine Corps did not receive any special or advanced armament and very little training in the use of amphibious ships, and in general its recruits are only ordinary soldiers and do not have any experience in the ways of fighting as Marines. Although the Soviet Union set up part of Exercise Zapad-81 (the largest military training exercise ever in the entire history of the Soviet Union, and included the largest amphibious landing operation in its history as well), the Syrian soldiers did not participate.

The marines did not participate in any real amphibious naval landing during any of the wars Syria was involved in. Instead, they were used as infantry with a direct ground clash in the Yom Kippur War and in the Lebanon Civil War. During the first Gulf War, as part of the Coalition of the Gulf War, Syria sent marines as a component of its 17,000 soldier contribution, which may mean that it considers them highly experienced soldiers.

=== Coastal Defense ===
The Syrian Coastal Defense Forces were placed under the command of the Syrian Arab Navy since 1984. The coastal defense consists of brigade infantry, each of which was responsible for monitoring a specific coastal sector, and in addition to them, there was a battalion that monitors. In addition to these forces, there are two artillery battalions armed with 18 artillery pieces, 130 mm caliber M-46. The Syrian coastal defense was also armed with Styx, Sepal, YJ-83 and P-800 Oniks missiles, as well as K-300P Bastion-P coastal defense missile system.

== Bases ==
Syrian Arab Navy bases

The Syrian Navy's headquarters was in Damascus and its main base was at Latakia on the Mediterranean Sea with other naval bases at Baniyas, Tartus and Minet el-Beida.

Latakia is Syria's largest and most active port, as it has 23 berths, and it includes a section for the repair of military ships within its sectors, and some of the navy's fast missile boats dock in it.

Al-Bayda port is located in the city of Baniyas, it was built specifically for naval military purposes. There are also training centers for naval officers and special soldiers in the port, and some transport ships dock there.

The Port of Tartus was the main base of the Syrian Navy, where the two navy frigates, its three amphibious ships and all its minesweepers dock, as well as some missile boats and navy transport ships. and includes the port 22 A dock with an area of three million square meters. With the arrival of the Russian Air Force at Bassel Al-Assad International Airport in 2015, the Syrian Naval Aviation helicopters moved a few miles north to Istamo after a new helicopter base was established at the arms depot. A majority of these assets were destroyed in the Israeli attacks against the fleet in 2024.

=== Russian base in Tartus ===
Tartus hosted a Soviet-era naval supply and maintenance base, under a 1971 agreement with Syria. The base was established during the Cold War to support the Soviet Navy fleet in the Mediterranean Sea. Since Russia forgave Syria three-fourths of its $13.4 billion Soviet-era debt and became its main arms supplier, the two countries have conducted talks about allowing Russia to develop and enlarge its naval base, so that Russia can strengthen its naval presence in the Mediterranean. Amid Russia's deteriorating relations with the West, because of the 2008 Russo-Georgian War and plans to deploy a US missile defense shield in Poland, President Assad agreed to the port's conversion into a permanent Middle East base for Russia's nuclear-armed warships. Since 2009, Russia has been renovating the Tartus naval base and dredging the port to allow access for its larger naval vessels.

Following the fall of the Assad regime, the agreement was cancelled by the Syrian transitional government and Russia began withdrawing its forces from Syria through the Tartus naval base, though a convoy coming from the Khmeimim Air Base was reportedly denied entry by Syrian troops on 10 February 2025. According to the United Kingdom Ministry of Defence negotiations between the Russia and the new Syrian government over the Khmeimim and Tartus military bases are "almost certainly ongoing," but the UK MoD notes that Moscow is in a weaker bargaining position due several factors including sheltering the former Syrian president Bashar al-Assad.

== Fleet ==
Prior to the disestablishment on December 8, 2024, the fleet consisted of the following ships:

Class	Image	Type	Ships	Origin	Quantity	Notes
Missile boat
Osa I & Osa II		Missile boat		USSR	10	6 Osa I and 4 Osa II. (6 Osa-II ships were confirmed destroyed by Israeli airstrikes at Latakia Naval Base in 2024)
Tir II (IPS 18)		Fast Attack Craft Torpedo boat		Iran	6	Believed to be locally produced by Maritime Industries Group or copies of North Korean patrol boats.
Patrol craft
Zhuk class		Patrol craft		USSR	8	23.8 m inshore vessels.
Raptor class		Patrol craft		Russia	2	16.9 m inshore vessels. Supplied by Russia in 2019.
MIG-S-1800 class		Patrol craft		Iran	6	Monohull and catamaran produced by Maritime Industries Group with longer variants (S-1900 and S-2600).
Minesweeper
Sonya class		Minesweeper		USSR	1	
Yevgenya class		Minesweeper		USSR	5	
Natya class		Minesweeper		USSR	1	
Amphibious warfare
Polnocny B		Landing ship tank		Polish People's Republic	3	
Training ship
Unknown		Training ship	Al Assad	Polish People's Republic	1	3,500-ton. Used as a cadet training ship by the Syrian naval academy.

=== Naval aviation ===
- 63rd Helicopter Brigade
  - 618th Maritime Warfare Squadron

Aircraft	Image	Version	Type	Origin	Quantity	Notes
Helicopters
Mil Mi-14		Haze-A; Haze-C	Anti-submarine helicopter Search and rescue helicopter	USSR	18	
Kamov Ka-28		Helix-A	Anti-submarine helicopter	USSR	4	

=== Coastal defence ===
Model	Image	Type	Origin	Quantity	Notes
Coastal defence
C-802		Anti-ship cruise missile	China	N/A	(CSS-N-8 Saccade)
Noor		Anti-ship cruise missile	Iran	10 systems	Delivered between 2009 and 2010.
K-300P Bastion-P / P-800 Yakhont		Mobile anti-ship and surface-to-surface missile	Russia	4 systems	(SS-C-5 Stooge)
P-5 Pyatyorka		Cruise missile	USSR	4 systems	(SS-C-1 Sepal)
P-15M/P-22		Anti-ship missile	USSR	6 systems	(SS-C-3 Styx)
M1954		Field gun	USSR	N/A	M-46

=== Former vessels ===
The Syrian Navy once operated three Project 613 submarines. These were former the Soviet boats S-167, S-171, and S-183.

They operated three Romeo-class submarines (S-1, S-53, S-101). Built in 1961 for Soviet Navy and transferred to Syria 1985–1987, decommissioned by mid-1990s and all scrapped by 1996.

Syria had two Vanya-class minesweepers since 1972. All ships were retired by the mid-1990s.

They also had two Petya-class frigates in derelict condition at Tartus port. Both probably retired in 2017 or 2018. One decommissioned Syrian frigate was sunk by the Russian Air Force as a training target on 15 April 2018 off the coast of Syria.

=== List of vessels ===
The following table shows the strength of the Syrian Arab Naval Forces according to the year since 1990, in addition to the deals to be concluded in this regard until 2015:

Class	Origin	1990	1995	2000	2005	2010	2012	2015	2024
Amur-1650 submarine	Russia							2	0
Project 633 submarine	USSR	3	1						
Petya-class frigate	USSR	2	2	2	2	2	2	2	0
Osa-class missile boat	USSR	12	14	10	12	10	16	16	0
Komar-class missile boat	USSR	4	4						
Tir-class speedboat	Iran					6	6	6	0
Zhuk-class patrol boat	USSR	8	8	8	8	8	8	8	0
Yevgenya-class minesweeper	USSR	4	5	3	3	3	5	5	0
Natya-class minesweeper	USSR	1				1	1	1	0
Sonya-class minesweeper	USSR	1	1	1	1	1	1	1	0
T43-class minesweeper	USSR	1	1	1	1	1			0
Vanya-class minesweeper	USSR	2							0
Polnocny-class landing ship	Polish People's Republic	3	3	3	3	3	3	3	0
Training ship Al-Assad	Polish People's Republic	1	1	1	1	1	1	1	0
Support ships	Unknown		2	3	3	2			0
Ghaem-class patrol boat	Iran					6	6	6	0
