= Pashe-class speedboat =

Class overview
- Builders: Marine Industries Organization
- Operators: Navy of the Islamic Revolutionary Guard Corps

General characteristics
- Type: Fast patrol boat
- Displacement: 30 tons full load
- Length: 19.5 m (64 ft 0 in)
- Beam: 4.2 m (13 ft 9 in)
- Draught: 0.9 m (2 ft 11 in)
- Installed power: Diesel
- Propulsion: 2 × MWM TBD 234 V12 engines, 1,646 horsepower (1.227 MW); 2 × shafts
- Speed: 36 knots (67 km/h)
- Complement: 8
- Sensors & processing systems: Surface search radar, I-band
- Armament: 2 × 23mm/80 (twin)

The Pashe or MIG-G-1900 is a class of fast patrol boat operated by the Navy of the Islamic Revolutionary Guard Corps.

It is a modified version of the American MK II boats, and is manufactured in Iran.
