= Iranian National Institute for Oceanography and Atmospheric Science =

Research organisation

- Official logo of INIOAS

Agency overview
- Formed: January 30, 1992; 34 years ago
- Jurisdiction: Ministry of Science, Research and Technology (Iran)
- Headquarters: Tehran
- Website: www.inio.ac.ir

The Iranian National Institute for Oceanography and Atmospheric Science (INIOAS, Persian: پژوهشگاه ملی اقیانوس شناسی و علوم جوی Pazhoheshgah e Melli e Oghianoos Shenasi va Oloum e Javvi) is a research center established by Iran's Ministry of Science, Research and Technology in 1992 under the name 'Iran Oceanography Center' to perform research in the field of oceanography. In March 2010, the organization was renamed to 'Iranian National Center for Oceanography (INCO)'. In June 2013, the organization was again renamed to 'Iranian National Institute for Oceanography and Atmospheric Science (INIOAS)'.

Upon its completion, INIOAS will have the Khalije Fars sea explorer at its disposal to conduct oceanographic research.
