= Murce-class speedboat =

1990s Iranian fast patrol craft class

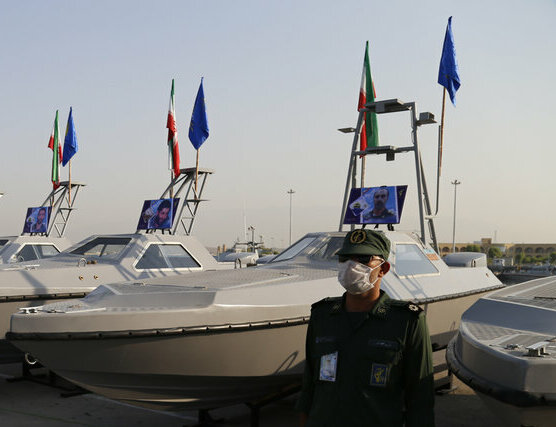

Class overview
- Builders: Marine Industries Organization
- Operators: Navy of the Islamic Revolutionary Guard Corps
- In service: 1990s–present

General characteristics
- Type: Fast patrol boat
- Displacement: 4 tons full load
- Length: 9.2 m (30 ft 2 in)
- Beam: 2.8 m (9 ft 2 in)
- Draught: 0.45 m (1 ft 6 in)
- Installed power: Diesel
- Propulsion: 2 × Volvo Penta engines, 1,260 horsepower (0.94 MW)
- Speed: 30 knots (56 km/h)
- Complement: 3
- Sensors & processing systems: Surface search radar
- Armament: 3 × 12.7mm machine gun; 1 × 106mm recoilless rifle; 1 × RPG-7 rocket launcher; 1 × 12-barelled 107mm MLR

Murce (also known as MIG-G-0900) is a class of fast patrol craft operated by naval forces of Iran.

== History ==
Murce boats are manufactured in Iran by Marine Industries Group. Its unarmed version has been produced in large numbers since the mid-1990s.

== Design ==
=== Dimensions and machinery ===
The ships have a displacement of 4 t (3.9 long tons) at full load. The class design is 9.2 m (30 ft) long, would have a beam of 2.8 m (9 ft 2 in) and a draft of 0.45 m (1 ft 6 in). It is powered by two Volvo Penta diesel engines. This system was designed to provide 1,260 horsepower (0.94 MW) for a top speed of 30 knots (56 km/h).

=== Armament ===
Murce-class boats are equipped with three 12.7mm machine guns, one 106mm recoilless rifle or RPG-7 rocket launcher, as well as a 12-barelled 107mm multiple rocket launcher. They also use surface search radar on I-band.
