= Heidar-class boat =

Iranian class of boats

Heidar-class speedboat
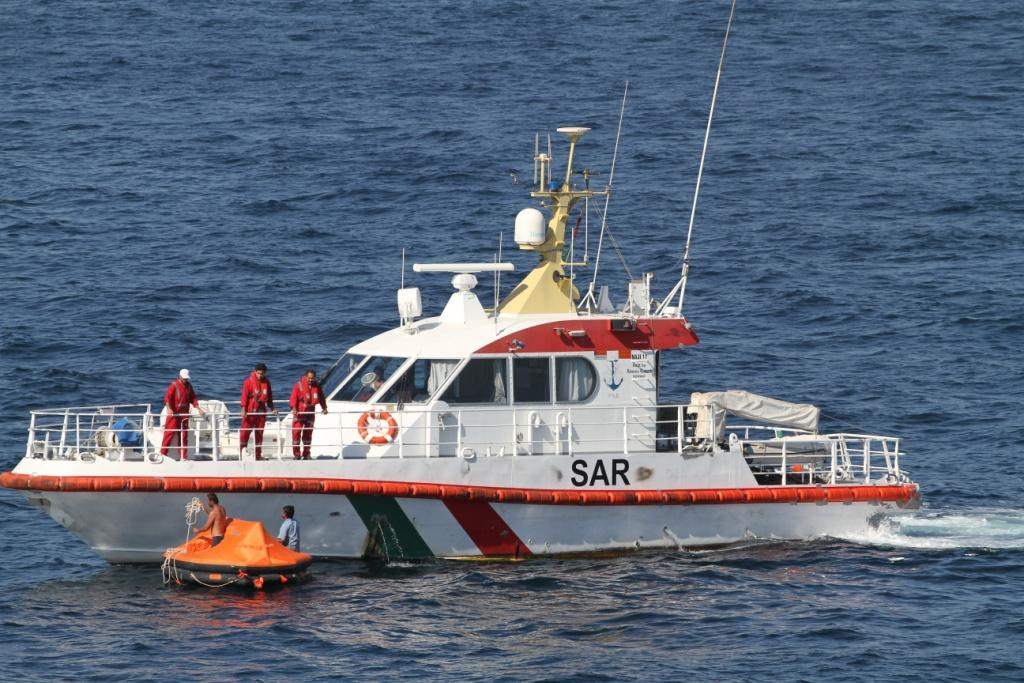

Class overview
- Builders: Marine Industries Organization
- Operators: Border Guard; Navy of the Islamic Revolutionary Guard Corps

General characteristics
- Type: Patrol boat

Heidar (Persian: حیدر, lit. 'lion') is a class of boats built and operated by Iran, mainly for maritime patrol and search and rescue missions.

== Design ==
Hull of Heidar boats is made of Aluminum. The boats are capable of self-righting.

== History ==
The class is manufactured at Shahid Darvishi Marine Industries of the Marine Industries Organization.

In July 2019, some vessels of this class were commissioned into the fleet of Border Guard, and in May 2020 an unknown number joined the Navy of the Islamic Revolutionary Guard Corps.
