= Kavoshgare Khalij Fars =

Iranian research vessel

History

Iran
- Name: Kavoshgare Khalij Fars
- Operator: Iranian National Institute for Oceanography and Atmospheric Science
- Builder: Marine Industries Organization
- Laid down: 2011
- In service: 4 February 2017
- Identification: IMO number: 9770402; MMSI number: 422070800; Callsign: EPDI7
- Status: In service

General characteristics
- Type: Research vessel
- Tonnage: 555 tons
- Length: 50 m (164 ft 1 in)
- Beam: 10 m (32 ft 10 in)
- Draft: 4 m (13 ft 1 in)
- Speed: 15 knots (28 km/h)
- Range: 3,000 nmi (5,600 km)
- Endurance: 45 days

The Kavoshgare Khalij Fars (Persian: کاوشگر خلیج فارس, lit. 'Persian Gulf Explorer') is a hydrographic and oceanographic research vessel built in 2017 by the Iranian Defense Ministry's Marine Industries Organization for the Iranian National Institute for Oceanography and Atmospheric Science.
