= Marine Industries Organization =

Defense industry complex in Iran

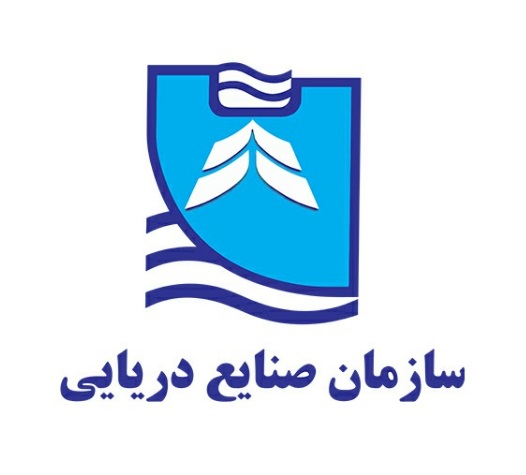
- Abbreviation: MIO
- Headquarters: Tehran, Iran
- Head: Commodore Amir Rastegari
- Parent organization: Ministry of Defence and Armed Forces Logistics
- Formerly called: Marine Industries Group (MIG)

Marine Industries Organization (MIO, Persian: سازمان صنایع دریایی), formerly known as Marine Industries Group (MIG), is a defense industry complex subordinate to the Iranian defence ministry. It is the major producer of equipment for both naval forces of Iran, the Islamic Republic of Iran Navy and the Islamic Revolutionary Guard Corps Navy.

== History ==
MIO was established in 1986.

As of 2023, MIO is placed under sanctions by Australia, Canada, Japan, Norway, South Korea, the US, the UK and the EU.

== Subordinates ==
Subordinates of the MIO are:

Organization	Location
Offshore Design and Research Center	Tehran
Shahid Julaei Industries	Tehran
Shahid Darvishi Industries	Bandar Abbas, Hormozgan
Shahid Tamjidi Industries	Bandar-e Anzali, Gilan
Shahid Mousavi Industries	Khorramshahr, Khuzestan

== Products ==
Subsidiaries of the MIO manufacture a wide range of maritime equipment, including submarines, high-speed boats, as well as principal surface combatants. Some of the products made by the MIO are:

- MIG-G-0800
- MIG-G-0900
- MIG-G-1900
- MIG-S-1800, built at Shahid Joolaee Industries
- MIG-S-2600, built at Shahid Joolaee Industries
- MIG-S-3700, built at Shahid Darvishi Industries
- MIG-S-4700, built at Shahid Darvishi Industries
- MIG-S-5000
- Moudge-class frigate
- RIBs, built at Shahid Joolaee Industries
- Heidar-class boat, built at Shahid Darvishi Industries
- Sina-class fast attack craft, built at Shahid Tamjidi Industries
- Ghadir-class submarine
- Fateh-class submarine, built at Shahid Darvishi Industries
- Kavoshgare Khalij Fars research vessel, built at Shahid Mousavi Industries

== Heads of the Organization ==
- Mostafa Esbati (2008 – 28 May 2012)
- Mohammad Mehdi Karbalai (28 May 2012 – 1 September 2013)
- Amir Rastegari (1 September 2013 – 4 October 2021)
- Hossein Jabal Amelian (4 October 2021 – c. October 2025)

== See also ==
- Iranian Navy's Factories
- Iran Electronics Industries
- Aerospace Industries Organization
- Iran Airports Company
- Iran Electronics Industries
- Iran Insurance Company
- Iranian Central Oil Fields Company
- Iranian Offshore Oil Company
- Atmospheric Science and Meteorological Research Center
- Atomic Energy Organization of Iran
- Emergency Medical Services Organization of Iran
- Iranian Defence Council
- Iranian Space Agency
- National Organization for Passive Defense
- Assassinations of Iranian nuclear scientists
- Targeted killing by Israel
- Supreme National Security Council
