= Zafar-class patrol craft =

Class of Iranian fast patrol boats

Class overview
- Builders: Marine Industries Organization
- Operators: Navy of the Islamic Revolutionary Guard Corps; Syrian Navy

General characteristics
- Type: Fast patrol boat (PBF)
- Displacement: 85 tons full load
- Length: 26.2 m (85 ft 11 in)
- Beam: 6.2 m (20 ft 4 in)
- Draught: 1.4 m (4 ft 7 in)
- Installed power: Diesel
- Propulsion: 4 × engines, 4,000 horsepower (3.0 MW); 4 × shafts
- Speed: 35 knots (65 km/h)
- Complement: 12
- Sensors & processing systems: Surface search radar, I-band
- Armament: 2 × 23mm/80 (twin); 1 × 12-barelled 107mm MLR

Zafar (Persian: ظفر, lit. 'victory') or MIG-S-2600 is a class of fast patrol boat operated by the Navy of the Islamic Revolutionary Guard Corps.

== History ==
According to the Conway's All the World's Fighting Ships, Iran purchased some Chaho-class fast attack crafts from North Korea in 1987. The Shahid Joolaee Marine Industries of the Marine Industries Organization has built vessels similar to the class with a different superstructure and a raised mast in order to improve radar capabilities. A 2007 report by the Israeli Institute for National Security Studies suggests that Iran has exported the vessel to Syria.
