= Tir-class speedboat =

Iranian torpedo boat

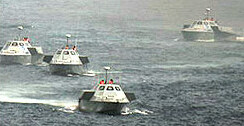

Class overview
- Name: Tir II (IPS 18)
- Operators: Iran; Syria

General characteristics
- Type: Torpedo Boat
- Displacement: 26t standard, 28 ¼ t full
- Length: 69 ft 4 in (21.13 m) x 18 ft 10 in (5.74 m) x 6 ft 9 in (2.06 m)
- Beam: 18 ft 10 in (5.74 m)
- Height: 6 ft 9 in (2.06 m)
- Installed power: 3 1200hp diesels (type unknown), 3 DIO waterjets
- Propulsion: 2 shafts
- Speed: 52 kn
- Range: 450 nmi (830 km) @ 25 knots
- Complement: 6
- Sensors & processing systems: I-band navigation radar
- Armament: x4 (2 twin mounts) 12.7 mm; x2 21 inch torpedo tubes (compatible with either Chinese, North Korean, or Iranian torpedoes); x1 Dooshka 12.7 mm MG

The Tir II (IPS 18) is an Iranian built small fast attack craft torpedo boat featuring a low, flush hull to reduce its radar cross-section. The radar is set on a retractable mast, with fixed 21" tubes inside the superstructure. Engines exhaust at the waterline to reduce its IR signature. Built by Iranian Maritime Industries (a subsidiary of the state-owned DIO company), the Bavar-class missile-armed boats are being acquired to replace the Tir-IIs.

Ten units are in service, believed to be manned by the IRGCN, not the regular Iranian navy. In late 2006/early 2007 six of the sixteen vessels built were transferred to the Syrian Navy.
