= Type 206-class gunboat =

Chinese navy ship

Class overview
- Operators: People's Liberation Army Navy
- Completed: 8+

General characteristics
- Type: Gunboat
- Displacement: 360 tonnes (350 long tons; 400 short tons)
- Length: 58.77 m (192 ft 10 in)
- Beam: 7.2 m (23 ft 7 in)
- Draft: 2.2 m (7 ft 3 in)
- Propulsion: 4 x diesel engines @ 8,800 hp with 4 shafts
- Speed: 30.5 knots (56.5 km/h; 35.1 mph)
- Range: 2,000 mi (3,200 km) at 14 knots (26 km/h; 16 mph)
- Complement: 57
- Sensors & processing systems: 1 × navigational or surface search radar
- Armament: 4 × Chinese Type 69 14.5 mm heavy machine guns (2×2); 2 × depth charge rails

The Type 206 class gunboat is a gunboat of the People's Republic of China's People's Liberation Army Navy. Also known as the Huludao class, it is a simplified version of the Type 037 class submarine chaser (also known as the Hainan class). Used for patrol duties, it has slightly reduced displacement, but an enlarged superstructure.

== Construction ==
A total of seven of this class were sold to Algeria from 1990 to 1991. At least one unit remained in People's Liberation Army Navy service for training and patrol missions, with unconfirmed reports that the Chinese unit was up-gunned. The specification of the Type 206 class gunboat is generally similar to that of the Type 037 class submarine chaser except for its much lighter armament, making it more suited for patrolling friendly coastal areas.

== Designation ==
Although the Chinese classified this vessel as gunboat, its missions and weaponry were more like those of patrol boats, and due to the drastic reduction of the number of the crew, the living conditions were significantly better. After evaluating the class, the Chinese eventually developed a much smaller 80 ton type harbor security and patrol boat to replace the obsolete and aging Shantou, Beihai, Huangpu and Yulin classes of gunboats performing the patrol duties, thus breaking the long tradition of the People's Liberation Army Navy of having no dedicated patrol boats.
