= Type 062 gunboat =

Class of patrol boats

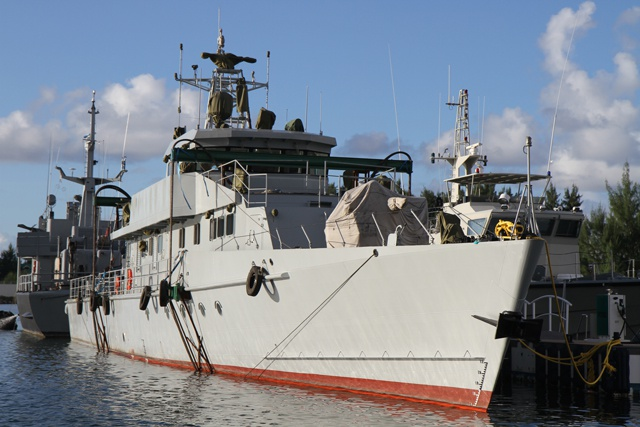
- Shanghai II-class gunboat

Class overview
- Name: Shanghai I & II class
- Operators: People's Liberation Army Navy
- Preceded by: Shantou & Huangpu classes
- Succeeded by: Type 062I (Shanghai III class)
- Subclasses: Shanghai I-class gunboat; Shanghai II-class gunboat
- In commission: 1950s-1990s
- Completed: 30 (PLAN)
- Retired: 30 (PLAN)

General characteristics
- Type: Gunboat
- Displacement: Shanghai-I class : 125 tonnes (123 long tons; 138 short tons) full; Shanghai-II class : 135 tonnes (133 long tons; 149 short tons) full
- Length: Shanghai-I class : 36 m (118 ft 1 in); Shanghai-II class : 38.78 m (127 ft 3 in)
- Beam: Shanghai-I class : 5.5 m (18 ft 1 in); Shanghai-II class : 5.41 m (17 ft 9 in)
- Draft: Shanghai-I class : 1.6 m (5 ft 3 in); Shanghai-II class : 1.55 m (5 ft 1 in)
- Propulsion: 2 × Soviet M50F-4 diesel engines, 1,200 hp (895 kW); 2 × 12D6 diesel engines, 910 hp (679 kW); 4 × shafts
- Speed: 28.5 knots (52.8 km/h; 32.8 mph)
- Range: 750 nmi (1,390 km) at 16.5 knots (30.6 km/h; 19.0 mph)
- Complement: 36
- Sensors & processing systems: 1 × navigational or surface search radar
- Armament: Shanghai-I class : 1 × twin Type 66 57 mm (2.2 in) gun; 4 × Type 61 25 mm (0.98 in) guns (2×2); 8 × Depth charges; Shanghai-II class : 4 × Chinese Type 61 37 mm (1.5 in) guns (2×2); 4 × Chinese Type 61 25 mm (0.98 in) guns (2×2); 1 × Chinese 81 mm (3.2 in) recoilless gun (some); 8 × Depth charges

The Type 062 gunboat (also known as Shanghai class) is a class of gunboat of the People's Liberation Army Navy first developed and constructed in the 1950s. This unsophisticated class is relatively well-armed for its size and is the most widely built and exported Chinese naval vessel in terms of numbers. A total of 30 were built, initial boats being known as the Shanghai I class and later slightly improved boats being known as the Shanghai II class. The Shanghai I class was slightly smaller than its successor, the Shanghai II class, displacing 125 tons instead of 135 tons, and had a twin Chinese Type 66 57 mm gun mount forward. All other specifications are identical to the Shanghai II class, which replaced the 57 mm with twin 37 mm gun mounts. Some boats remained in active service well into the early 1990s in the PLA navy and longer in the case of the Korean People's Navy.

== Origin ==
Type 062 gunboat is a result of several competing/developmental designs, all in response of PLAN's request of a new 100 ton gunboats, first of which was Type 0108 gunboat that was based on PLANS Sea Whale (Hai Jing, 海鲸), an E-boat that was ex-ROCS No 101. Specification:

- Displacement: 110 ton
- Length: 33.5 meter
- Propulsion: 4 ex-Soviet M50F-3 diesel engine, 4800 horse power, 4 shafts
- Armament: 1 twin 37mm, 1 twin 25 mm guns
- Speed: 30.4 kn

Also referred as “81 gunboat (81炮艇)”, construction begun in November 1958 at Naval Shipyard 301 (current Plant No. 4808), and completed at the end of 1959, but proved not successful, with only 1 unit built and since retired. A follow-on design was the Type 0110 gunboat, which was built by Huangpu Shipyard (Naval Shipyard No 201), with a total of 3 completed in 1960. Specification:

- Displacement: 120 ton
- Length: 35.53 meter
- Beam: 5.48 meter
- Draft: 1.6 meter
- Propulsion: 4 ex-Soviet M50F-3 diesel engine, 4800 horse power, 4 shafts
- Armament: 1 twin 37mm guns, 1 twin ZPU-2 14.5 mm machine guns
- Speed: 28.5 kn
- Endurance: 650 nmi

Based on experience gained from Type 105, 0108, & 0110, PLAN issued a new requirement which was assigned to Dalian Shipyard, with the first unit completed in 1961, designated as Type 0111. Specification:

- Displacement: 115 ton
- Length: 38.78 meter
- Propulsion: 4 ex-Soviet M50F-3 diesel engine, 4800 horse power, 4 shafts
- Armament: 1 twin ZIF-31 57 mm, 1 twin 25 mm guns
- Speed: 30.2 kn

After evaluation completed in October 1962, PLAN decided to improve the design based on Type 0111 and then mass-produce the improved design. Redesign work was assigned to No 708 Institute, and in July 1963, the improvement redesign Type 0111Jia (甲) was formally designated as Type 062.

== Type 062 gunboat ==
The Type 062 gunboat (NATO reporting name: Shanghai I & II class), is a family of gunboats built to replace the preceding Shantou and Huangpu-class gunboats.

During the late 1950s, the PLAN found they needed a more powerful gunboat, as the 50-80-ton class Shantou and Huangpu-class gunboats were too small and lacked both firepower and endurance. Several prototypes are built by different shipyards. They were the Type 0105 from Luda (3), the Type 0108 from Qingdao (1), the Type 0109 from Shanghai (10), and the Type 0110 from Guangzhou (3). Displacement of the prototypes varied from 100 to 150 t, speed varied from 28–30 knots (52–56 km/h; 32–35 mph), with different weapon arrangements including 57IIx1, 37IIx1, 14.5IIx2 or 37IIx2,14.5IIx2. In 1960, a hybrid of all the prototypes, Type 0111 was laid down at Dalian shipyard, Luda. Full production variants became known as the Type 062.

A total of 30 were built, initial boats being known as the Shanghai I class and later slightly improved boats being known as the Shanghai II class. Some boats even remained in active service well into the early 1990s. The Shanghai I class was slightly smaller than its successor, the Shanghai II class, displacing 125 tons instead of 135 tons, and had a twin Chinese Type 66 57 mm gun mount forward. All other specifications are identical to the Shanghai II class, which replaced the 57 mm with twin 37 mm gun mounts.

The L-12V-180 diesel engines used on the Type 062 were prone to overheating, thirsty for fuel and had a poor working life. So the smaller L-12D-6 diesel engine was introduced. The new engine was more fuel efficient and had a longer life, but rated only 910 horsepower (680 kW), resulting in a maximum speed of only 28.5 knots (52.8 km/h; 32.8 mph). The low speed disappointed PLAN and was one of the reasons construction ended at 30 boats.

=== Exports ===
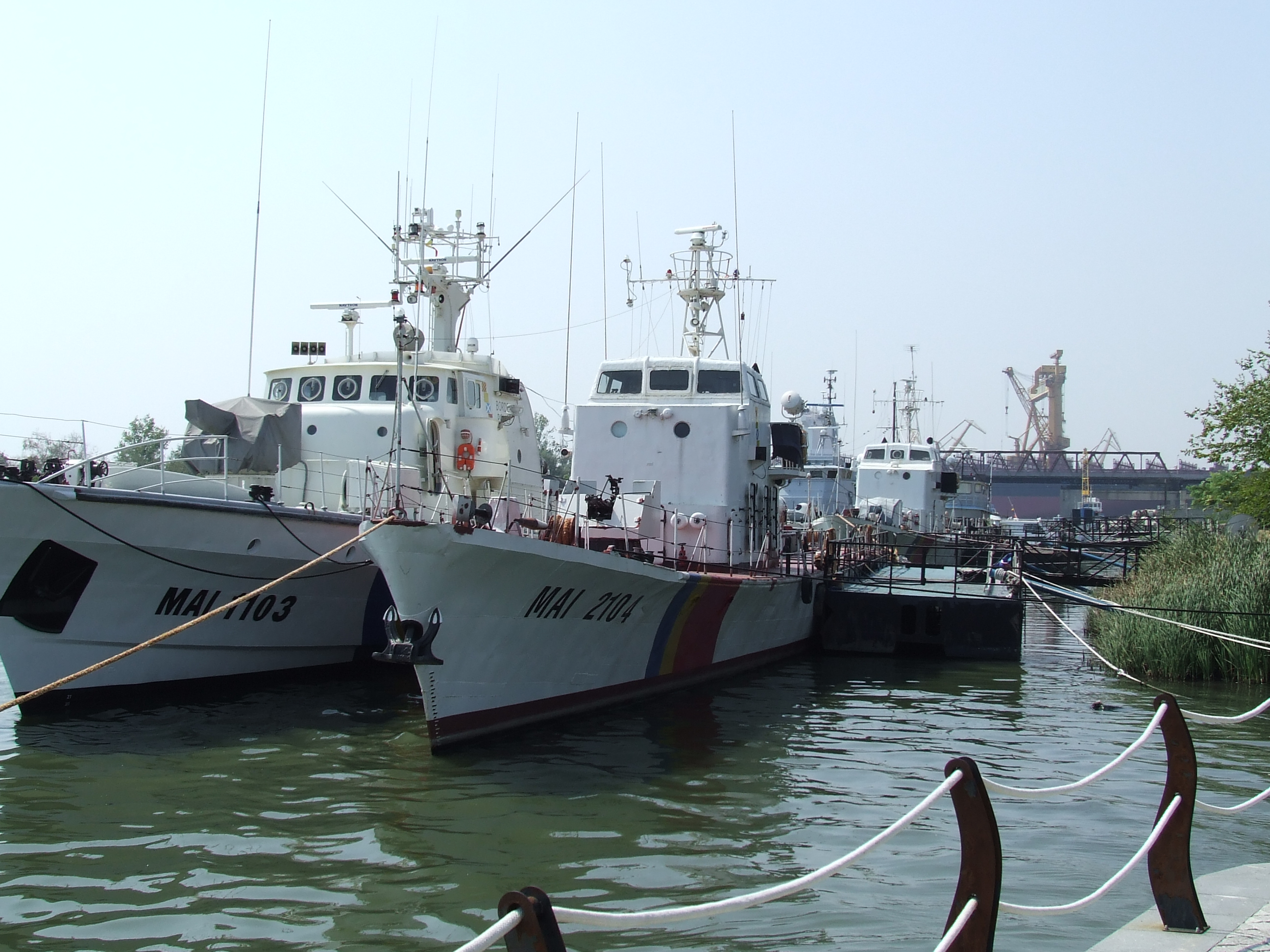
2014 coast guard ship type 062 built in Romania for East Timor

A number have been exported to foreign customers, with most still remaining in service:

- Albania
  - Albanian Naval Defense Forces
- Bangladesh
  - Bangladesh Navy
  - Bangladesh Coast Guard
- Democratic Republic of Congo
  - Navy of the Democratic Republic of the Congo
- Egypt
  - Egyptian Navy
- North Korea
  - Korean People's Navy
- Pakistan
  - Pakistan Navy
- Seychelles
  - Seychelles Coast Guard
- Sierra Leone
  - Republic of Sierra Leone Armed Forces
- Sri Lanka
  - Sri Lanka Navy
- Tunisia
  - Tunisian Navy
- East Timor
  - Timor Leste Defence Force: Type 062 ships were built under license in Roumania between 1972 and 1989 . The project was adapted by roumanian naval engineers for use in the rough conditions of the Black Sea.There were four variants of the type 062 in the Roumanian Navy: coast guard ship (deleted in 2014), submarine hunters (deleted in the 1990s), a variant for civil use and two vessels for divers (in active service).

=== Fushun-class minesweeper ===
Fushun-class minesweeper was developed from the Shanghai II-class gunboat. This minesweeper version had a reduced armament, with mine-sweeping gear replacing some of the weapons. All other characteristics of this class are identical to the Shanghai II class, and all of 20 units were transferred to the reserves, subordinated to the naval militia for training purposes. As of 2015 they have all been mothballed.

== Type 062I-class gunboat ==
Class overview
- Name: Shanghai III class
- Operators: People's Liberation Army Navy
- Preceded by: Type 062 (Shanghai I & II class)
- Succeeded by: Type 022 missile boat
- In commission: 1988-present (PLAN)
- Completed: Total number unknown, widely exported
- Active: 17 (PLAN); Unknown export number

General characteristics
- Type: Gunboat
- Displacement: 170 tonnes (170 long tons; 190 short tons)
- Length: 41 m (134 ft 6 in)
- Beam: 5.3 m (17 ft 5 in)
- Draft: 1.8 m (5 ft 11 in)
- Propulsion: 2 × Chinese L-12V-180A diesel engines, 4,400 hp (3,281 kW); 4 × shafts
- Speed: 25 knots (46 km/h; 29 mph)+
- Range: 750 mi (1,210 km) at 17 knots (31 km/h; 20 mph)
- Complement: 43
- Sensors & processing systems: 1 × Pot Head surface search radar
- Armament: 4 × Chinese Type 76A 37 mm (1.5 in) guns (2×2); 4 × Chinese or Soviet 23 mm (0.91 in) heavy machine guns (2×2)

The Type 062I-class gunboat (NATO: Shanghai III class), is the successor of the original Type 062 Shanghai I & II-class gunboats of the People's Liberation Army Navy. The Shanghai III-class gunboat is more heavily armed than its predecessor, with the 23 mm guns replacing the 14.5 mm heavy machine guns and is also substantially larger at 170 tons. Significantly more Shanghai III-class gunboats have entered service in foreign navies than in the People's Liberation Army Navy, and the ones in the Chinese inventory are mainly used for training foreign crews, and not all export boats have the same configuration due to different customers' requirements. They are primarily used for coastal and inland patrol.

=== Haizhui-class submarine chaser ===
The Haizhui-class submarine chaser is based on the Type 062I-class gunboat and entered service in the early 1960s. It was a stopgap measure as a follow on class to Kronshtadt-class submarine chaser before the arrival of the Type 037 submarine chaser in the mid-1960s. Although Type 062I originated as a gunboat, the submarine chaser version was more successful in serving the People's Liberation Army Navy, actually serving operationally rather than a training vessel for foreign crews. The gunboat version is more successful in export market, however.

=== Exports ===
- (Timor-Leste) East Timor
- Sri Lanka

== See also ==
- Type 056 corvette
- Type 037 corvette
- Type 022 missile boat
