= PNS Azmat =

2011 Azmat-class missile boat

PNS Azmat (1013)
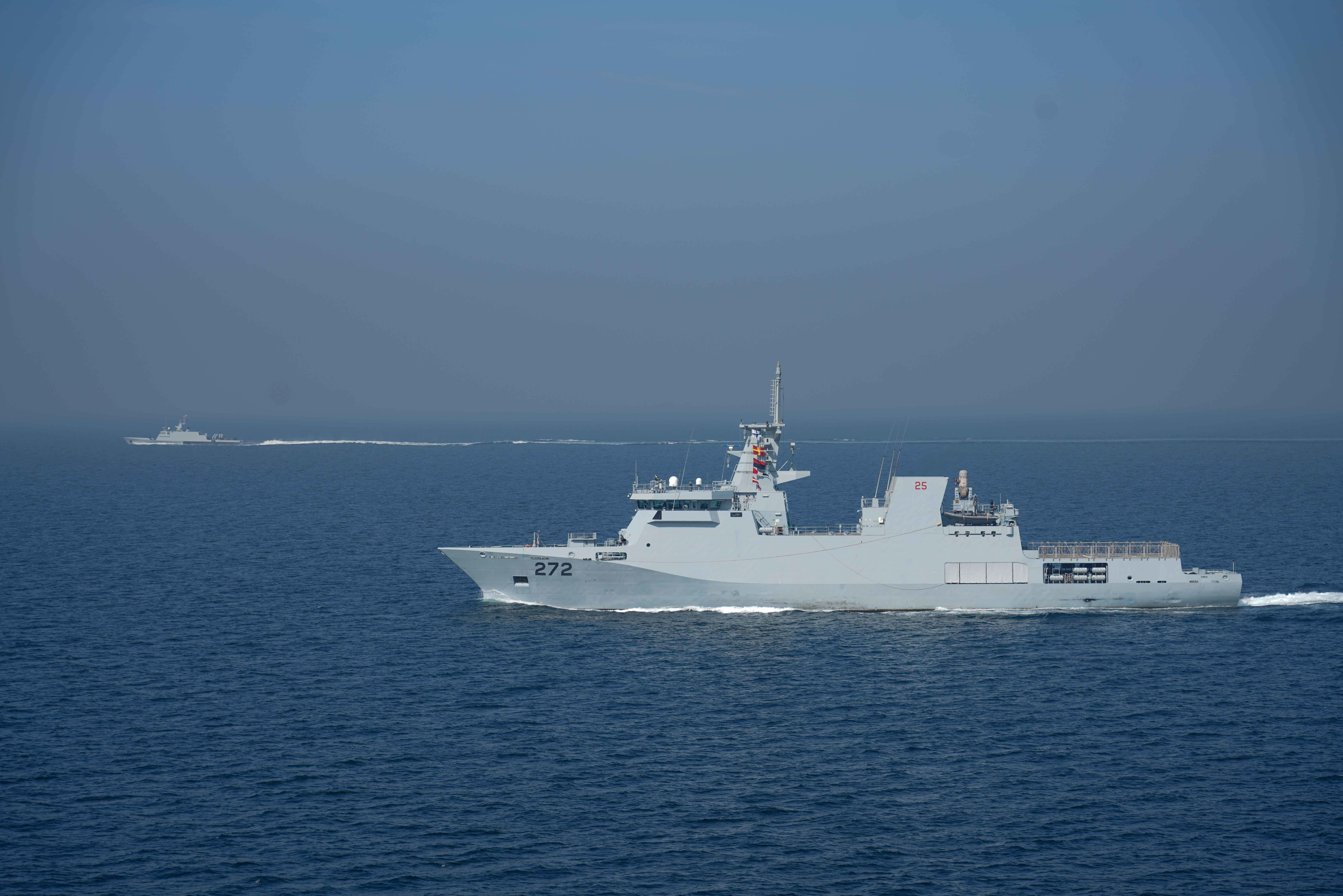
- PNS Azmat in the Gulf of Oman

History

Pakistan
- Name: Azmat (lit. Greatness)
- Builder: China State Shipbuilding Corporation, Xingang
- Launched: 20 September 2011
- Sponsored by: Masood Khan
- Commissioned: 24 April 2012
- Identification: Pennant number: FAC(M)–P1013
- Status: active

General characteristics
- Class & type: Azmat-class missile boat
- Displacement: 560 tons
- Length: 206 ft 7 in (62.97 m)
- Beam: 28 ft 9 in (8.76 m)
- Speed: 30 knots (56 km/h; 35 mph)
- Range: approximately 1,000 nmi (1,900 km; 1,200 mi)
- Complement: 12–14
- Armament: Guns; 1 × 23 mm dual guns; 1 × AK-630 CIWS; Missiles; 2 × 4-cell C-802A SSM launchers

PNS Azmat is the lead ship of the Azmat-class missile boats of the Pakistan Navy based on the Chinese design Type 037II Houjian-class. Azmat was commissioned on 24 April 2012 at Tianjin, China after being launched on 20 September 2011. It has the pennant number 1013.

== Design ==
PNS Azmat FAC(M) is a green water vessel and does not have blue water capabilities, and so it is mostly used to patrol the coast, and to assist the Coast Guard in any special operations that require extensive firepower.

== Armament ==
PNS Azmat is equipped with eight C-802A anti-ship cruise missiles, carried in two quadruple missile containers. The vessel uses a fully automatic 23 mm gun. The decision to install the 23 mm gun was due to lack of hull space, which meant less storage area for 75-100 mm rounds required for larger guns and weight requirements. Also a 23 mm gun is much easier to maintain than larger 75 mm to 100 mm guns. For its defensive capabilities, Azmat uses a CIWS.
