= Kuang Hua VI-class missile boat =

Type of missile boat of Chinese Navy

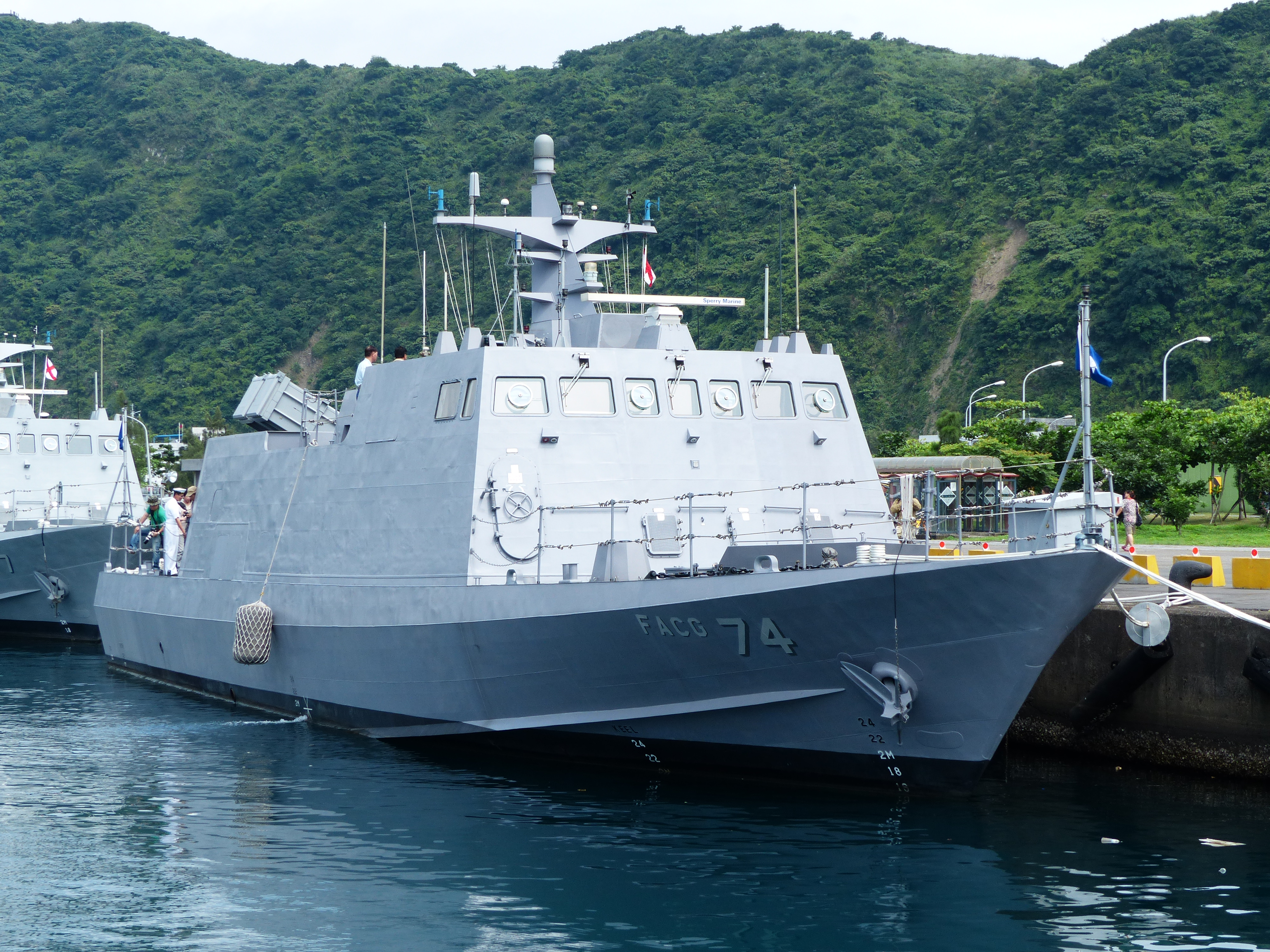

Class overview
- Name: Kuang Hua VI class
- Builders: CSBC Corporation, Taiwan
- Operators: Republic of China Navy
- Preceded by: Hai Ou class
- Cost: NT$401 million (US$12.3 million)
- In service: 2003
- Planned: 30, plus the prototype FACG-60
- Active: 30 (as of September 1, 2025)
- Retired: 1（prototype）

General characteristics
- Type: Missile boat
- Displacement: 171 t (168 long tons)
- Length: 34.2 m (112 ft 2 in)
- Beam: 7.6 m (24 ft 11 in)
- Height: 4 m (13 ft 1 in)
- Draught: 3 m (9.8 ft)
- Propulsion: Tognum Series 4000 diesel engines
- Speed: 33 knots (61 km/h; 38 mph)
- Range: 1,000 nmi (1,900 km; 1,200 mi) at 12 knots (22 km/h; 14 mph)
- Complement: 19
- Electronic warfare & decoys: 2 × AV-2 decoy launchers
- Armament: 4 × Hsiung Feng II AShM; 1 × 20 mm T-75 cannon; 2 × 7.62 mm T-74 machine guns

The Kuang Hua VI-class missile boat is a type of missile boat in service with the Republic of China Navy (ROCN). The prototype was launched in 2003, and the boat first entered service by 2010.

== Project history ==
The Kuang Hua VI project was first unveiled in 1996, designed to replace the Hai Ou-class missile boats in service with the ROCN. The missile boat's design was to be stealthy, therefore not carrying any air or surface search radar on board, except for the navigational radar. The missile boat's targeting info is obtained from shore and other larger naval combatants via datalink.

The contract to produce 30 Kuang Hua VI missile boats was awarded to CSBC Corporation, Taiwan (then as China Ship Building Corporation, CSBC) in 2003. The prototype, FACG-60 (Fast Attack Craft, Guided missile), was commissioned on October 1, 2003. However, the tender was subsequently disputed by rival bidders and the Taiwanese legislature froze the budget for the construction of the class until 2007. The ROCN and CSBC subsequently agreed that construction would commence on the 30 vessels and that work would be completed by the end of 2011, in batches of two missile crafts, but the construction work would be shared with two other civilian shipyards.

It was reported on November 26, 2007, that work on the first two missile boats had begun.

== In-service history ==
FACG 61 and 62 were handed over to the ROC Navy in late May 2009, and entered ROCN service by end of August 2009. A second batch consisting of FACG 63 and 64 was handed over to the ROC Navy on September 5, 2009, and entered service November 10, 2009. The third batch of FACG 65 and 66 was handed over to ROCN on October 30, 2009, and entered service December 17, 2009. A fourth batch of FACG 68 and 69 (hull number 67 skipped due to two digits adding up to 13, considered an unlucky number by ROCN) was handed over to ROCN December 22, 2009, and entered service on February 10, 2010. The fifth batch of FACG 70 and 71 was handed over to ROCN March 15, 2010. FACG 70 and 71 entered service on May 18, 2010, as part of the first KH-6 missile craft guided squadron, 5th Sea Dragon squadron, that stood with the first 10 missile craft and the prototype on May 18, 2010.

According to news reports, it was expected the 31 KH-6 guided missile craft would form into 3 existing Sea Dragon squadrons, and phase out three of the five current Sea Dragon squadrons with older and small Hai Ou missile boats. The two remaining Sea Dragon squadrons with Hai Ou missile boats that were not even 20 years old would continue on in service. On May 14, 2010, the sixth batch of FACG 72 and 73 was handed over to ROCN, and commissioned into service on July 15, 2010. On July 16, 2010, the seventh batch of FACG 74 and 75 was handed over to ROCN. On September 27, 2010, the eighth batch of FACG 77 and 78 (hull number 76 skipped due unlucky number when added 2 digits together) was handed over to ROCN and entered service with ROCN on November 12, 2010. FACG 79 and 80 were handed over to the ROC Navy on November 22, 2010, and entered service on January 10, 2011. The last batch of KH-6 missile boats, FACG 92 and 93, was handed over to the ROC Navy on October 12, 2011.

All 31 KH-6 missile boats are part of the Hai Chiao (Sea Dragon) PGMG Guided Missile Boat/Craft Group (海蛟大隊), which has 5 missile boat squadrons, with 1st, 2nd and 5th squadrons having all the KH-6 missile boats, while the 3rd and 4th squadron still had 20 Hai Ou missile boats remaining in service. By 2013, all Hai Ou missile boats were decommissioned.

The 5th Missile Boat Squadron, officially commissioned and serving at Tsoying naval base in southern Taiwan with 11 KH-6 missile boats on May 18, 2010, consisted of FABG 60 (prototype), 61-71. The 1st Missile Boat Squadron, officially commissioned and serving at Suao naval base in northern Taiwan with 10 KH-6 missile boats on April 7, 2011, consisted of FABG 72-82. The 2nd Missile Boat Squadron, officially commissioned and serving at Tsoying naval base in southern Taiwan with 10 KH-6 missile boats on December 2, 2011, consisted of FABG 83-93.

The only prototype of the Kuang Hwa VI, FACG-60, lost power and ended up hard aground upon concrete tetrapods forming the breakwater of an outer seawall. The navy was able to salvage and repair the damage. FACG-60 was refurbished as new after recovery.

On September 1, 2025, FACG-60 was retired in Kaohsiung.

== Design ==
In 2007 it was announced that Taiwan had placed an order for 90 Series 4000 large diesel engines from Tognum subsidiary MTU Asia, which would be used to power the Kuang Hua VI class, three engines per missile boat.

== See also ==
- Type 022 missile boat
- Hamina-class missile boat
- Roussen-class fast attack craft
