= Type 351 Radar =

The Type 351 is the Chinese copy of the Russian Reya radar system which came into service in 1960. It is an improved version of earlier Pot Drum (1958) with higher resolutions. Type 351 operates in two pulse bands, the wide one for search, and the narrow one for track, and both in X-band.

It was found primarily in older FACs such as the Hainan.

== Specifications ==
(Based on Reya)

- I–band
- Beam: 3°
- Peak Power: 100 kW
- Pulse width: 0.25–1 μs
- PRF: 1600–1650, 3200–3300 pps
- Other reported names:
  - POTHEAD
  - Reya
