= Azmat-class fast attack craft =

Chinese-Pakistani surface vessel for the Pakistan Navy

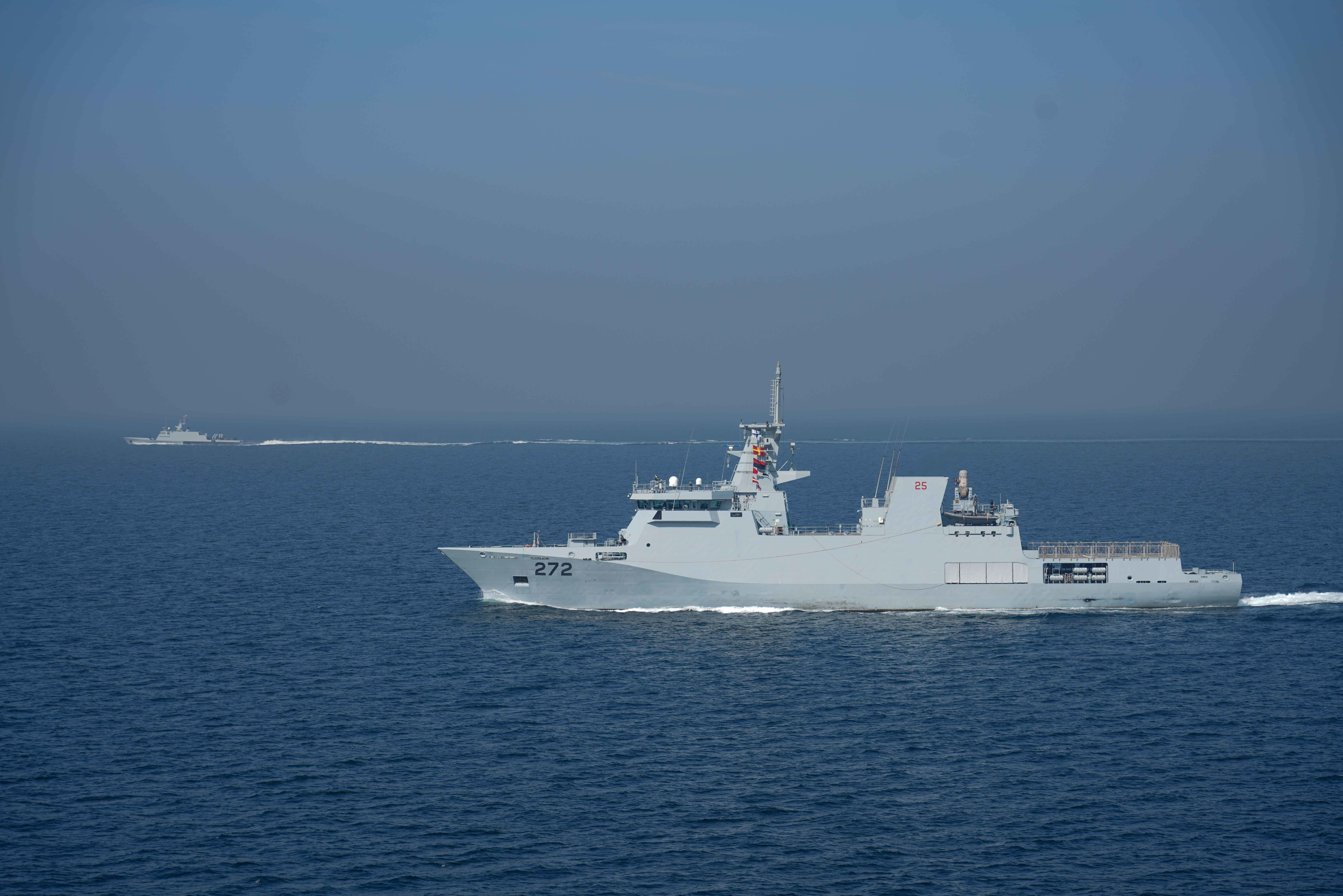
- PNS Azmat

Class overview
- Name: Azmat class
- Builders: China State Shipbuilding Corp. (Designer); Maritime Technologies Complex (Designer); Xingang Shipyard, China; KSEW Ltd, Pakistan
- Operators: Pakistan Navy
- Subclasses: Type 037II Houjian
- Cost: $400 million USD (4 Ships); ($100 million USD per unit)
- Built: 2011–2019
- In service: 2012 – present
- In commission: 2012– present
- Planned: 6
- Completed: 4
- Active: 4

General characteristics
- Type: Fast attack craft
- Displacement: 560 tons (standard); 673 tons (PNS Haibat)
- Length: 63 m (206 ft 8 in)
- Beam: 8.8 m (28 ft 10 in)
- Draught: 2.46 m (8 ft 1 in)
- Propulsion: CODAD; 4 × Pielstick at 1,584 hp (1,181 kW) with 3 shafts
- Speed: 30 knots (56 km/h; 35 mph) maximum
- Range: 1,000 nmi (1,900 km; 1,200 mi)
- Complement: 15, 5 officers, 10 enlisted
- Sensors & processing systems: SR-60 / Type 360 Radar air/surface search radar; KH 2007 navigation radar
- Electronic warfare & decoys: RIBAT ESM System (GIDS Pakistan); PJ-46 Chaff launchers
- Armament: Guns: 1 × 30 mm AK-630M CIWS; 1 × Aselsan STAMP; Anti Submarine Warfare: Anti Submarine Rockets (PNS Haibat); Anti Ship / Land Attack: 4 × 4-cell C-802 ASCM launchers OR; 3 × 3-cell Harbah SSM launchers

The Azmat-class fast attack craft (military designation: Azmat FAC(M)) is a class of missile-bearing fast attack craft, currently in service with the Pakistan Navy. The Azmat-class is based on the Chinese design, Houjian class. The Pakistani Azmat-class is the modernized version according to the requirements of Pakistan Navy.

The project was jointly designed and constructed in Pakistan and China after a partnership agreement was signed between two Chinese contractors, China State Shipbuilding Corporation and the Xingang Shipyard and the Pakistan-based KSEW Ltd. The Azmat-class ships are intended for deployment in maritime patrol, anti-surface warfare, anti-air warfare, search-and-rescue (SAR) and anti-piracy missions.

== List of vessels ==
Pennant number	Name	Call sign	Commissioned	Contracting builder
1013	PNS Azmat	Azmat	24 April 2012	China State Shipbuilding Corp. and Xingang Shipyard in China
1014	PNS Dehshat	Dehshat	12 June 2014	KSEW Ltd in Pakistan
1027	PNS Himmat	Himmat	29 July 2017	KSEW Ltd. in Pakistan.
1028	PNS Haibat	Haibat	31 March 2022	KSEW Ltd. in Pakistan.
