= Dvora-class fast patrol boat =

Israeli Sea Corps patrol class

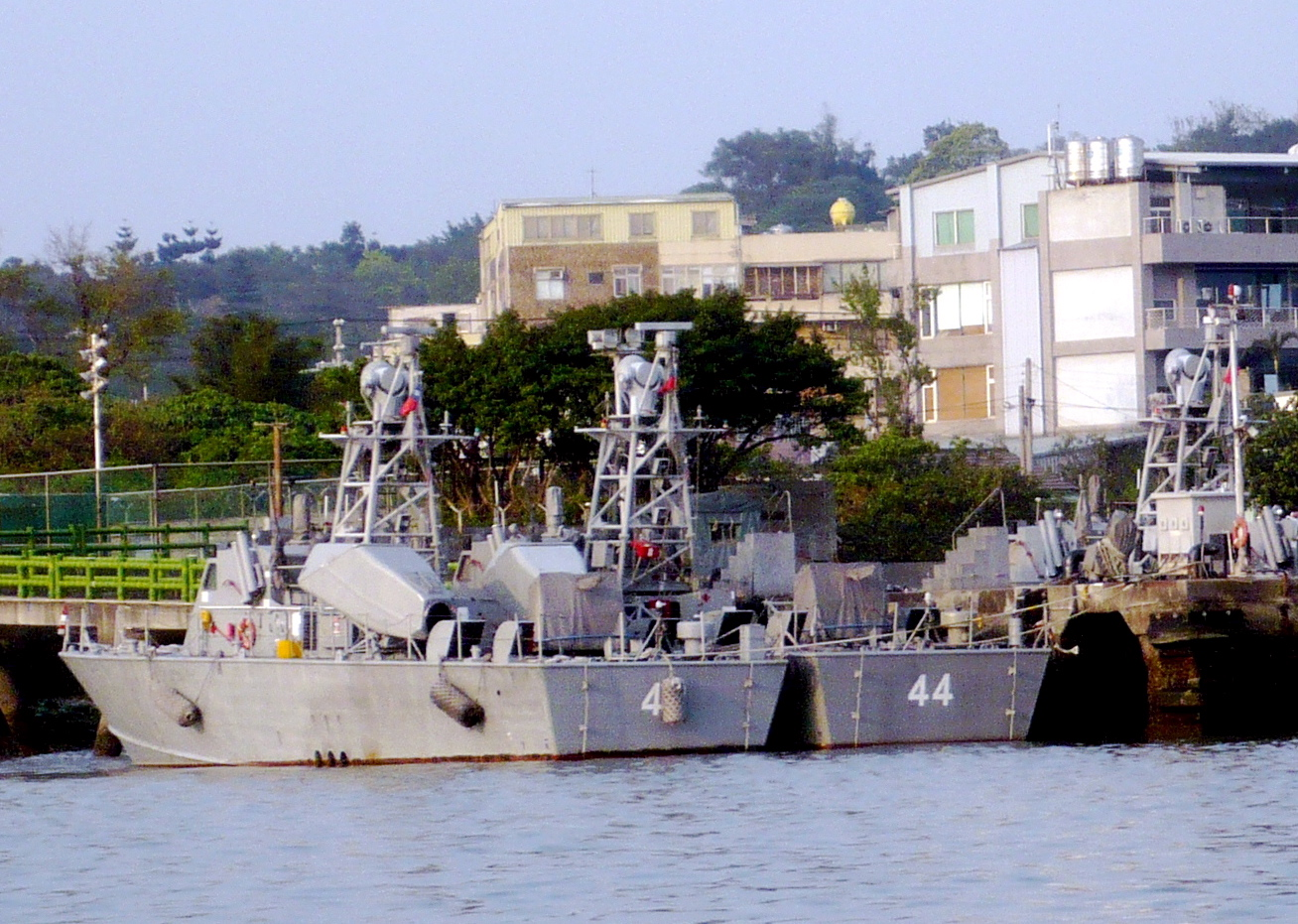
- Republic of China Navy Dvora-class patrol boat

Class overview
- Name: Dvora class
- Builders: IAI-Ramta, Colombo Dockyard Limited; CSBC Corporation (Taiwanses variant Hai Ou class)
- Operators: Israeli Sea Corps Navy, Sri Lanka Navy, Republic of China Navy
- Preceded by: Dabur class
- Succeeded by: Super Dvora Mk II class
- Subclasses: Hau Ou class
- In commission: 1988

General characteristics
- Type: Fast patrol boat
- Displacement: 45.0 tons full load
- Length: 21.80 metres (71.5 ft)
- Beam: 5.50 metres (18.0 ft)
- Draught: 1.1 metres (3.6 ft)
- Propulsion: 2 × diesel engines with 4,570 hp (3,410 kW) and two Arneson ASD-16 articulating surface drives.
- Speed: 37 knots (69 km/h; 43 mph) (max)
- Range: 560 nmi (1,040 km; 640 mi)
- Armament: 1 × Oerlikon 20 mm cannon; 2 × 12.7 mm machine guns

The Dvora-class fast patrol boat is a fast class of patrol boats built by Israel Aerospace Industries for the Israeli Sea Corps, Sri Lanka Navy, and Republic of China Navy based on the Israeli Dabur class.

== Operational history ==
=== Sri Lanka ===
The Dvora class has become the work horse of the Sri Lanka Navy, which has deployed it to counter LTTE operations at sea with 12 Dvoras acquired between 1982 and 1988. Since then Dvoras have been made in Sri Lanka and has been the basis for the more advanced Colombo class fast patrol boat built by the Colombo Dockyard Limited.

=== Taiwan ===
The Republic of China Navy uses Dvoras as Fast Attack Missile Craft, purchasing two and using them as a pattern for the almost-identical, locally-built Hai Ou-class missile boats (Hai Ou class has three propeller shafts whereas Dvora class has two), 50 built. Both classes, being an anti-ship asset, are armed with additional two Hsiung Feng I anti-ship missiles and have been in ROCN service for over 20 years.

== Operators ==
Israel

- Israeli Sea Corps - 9 (Initially 10 were in service, 1 decommissioned after collision with a rocky shoal)

Sri Lanka

- Sri Lanka Navy - 3 (2 acquired in 1984 and 4 in 1986; 3 sunk in 1993, 1995 and 1996).

Republic of China

- Republic of China Navy - 2 original Dvora acquired in the 1980s and 48 local variant version Hai Ou-class (Seagull), retired beginning in 1999 to 2012 (replaced by 30 Kuang Hua VI-class missile boats).

Gambia

- Four units (ex-ROCN FABG-7, FABG-11, FABG-29 and FABG-32) received from Republic of China in 2009 as patrol gunboats. All 4 were originally slated for Republic of Malawi in 2008.

Paraguay

- Two units (ex-ROCN FABG-1 and FABG-2) received from Republic of China in 1994 as patrol gunboats.

== Bibliography ==
- Fontanellaz, Adrien (2020). Paradise Afire Volume 3: The Sri Lankan War 1990-1994. Helion & Company. ISBN 978-1913118624.

Preceded by Dabur	Dvora series	Succeeded by Super Dvora Mk II
