= Dabur-class patrol boat =

Israeli naval ship class

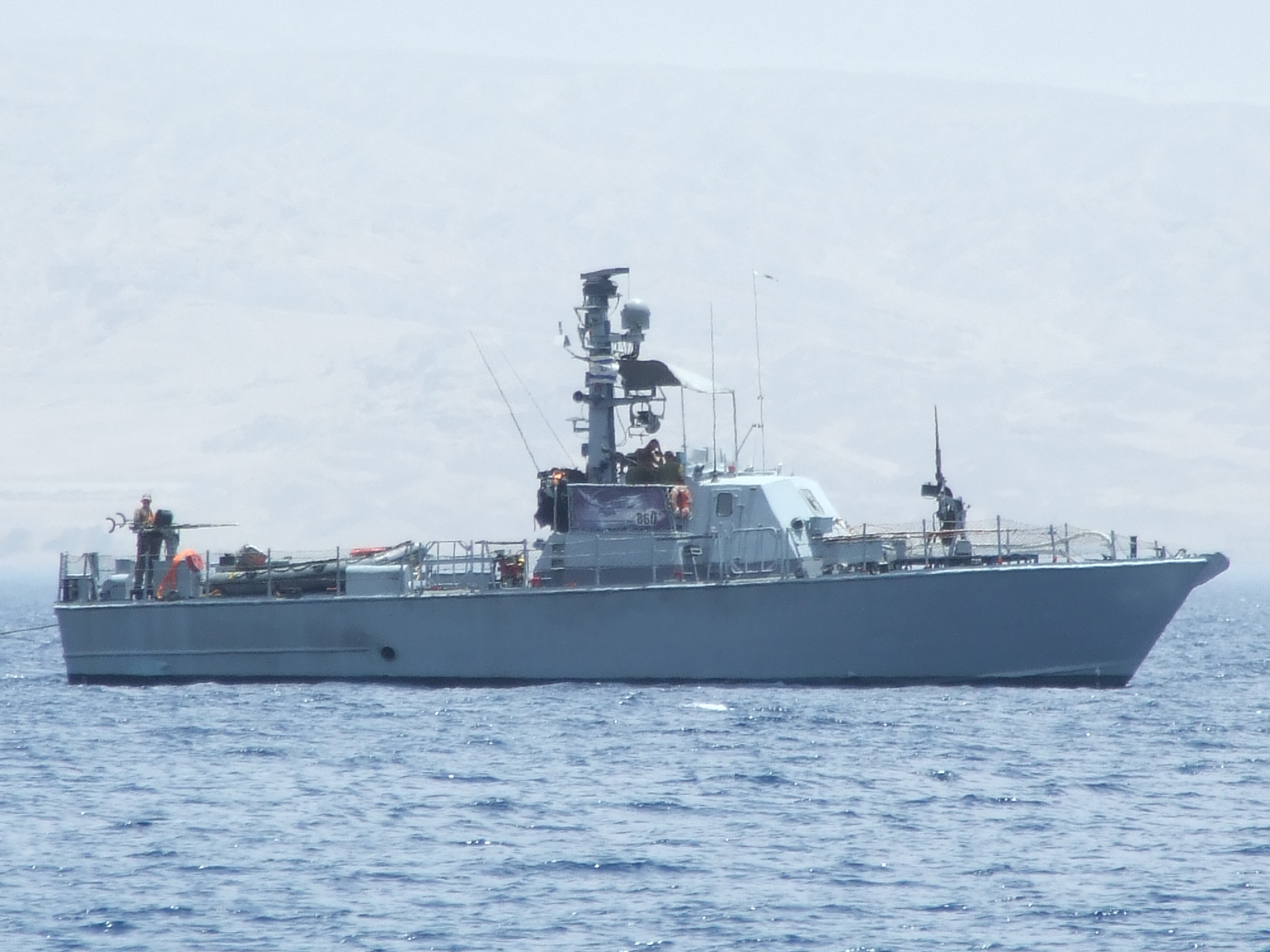
- Israeli Dabur (number 860) in the bay of Eilat

Class overview
- Name: Dabur class
- Builders: Sewart Seacraft (12 boats); IAI-Ramta
- Succeeded by: Dvora class
- In commission: 1970

General characteristics
- Type: Fast patrol boat
- Displacement: 35 tons (45 tons loaded)
- Length: 19.80 m (65.0 ft)
- Beam: 5.80 m (19.0 ft)
- Draft: 1.8 m (5 ft 11 in)
- Installed power: 2,400 hp (1,800 kW)
- Propulsion: 2 × diesel General Motors type 12V71
- Speed: Max speed: 29 kn (54 km/h; 33 mph); Patrol speed: 21 kn (39 km/h; 24 mph)
- Range: at Max speed: 540 nmi (1,000 km; 620 mi); at Patrol speed: 560 nmi (1,040 km; 640 mi)
- Crew: 6–9
- Electronic warfare & decoys: Decca 926 radar
- Armament: 2 × Oerlikon 20 mm cannon; 2 × 12.7mm machine guns; 2 × 324mm torpedo tubes for the Mark 46 torpedo; Depth charges; Carl Gustav recoilless rifles

The Dabur (from Hebrew :Hornet) class is a class of patrol boats originally built at the Sewart Seacraft (now Swiftships) shipyard in the United States for the Israeli Navy, and later constructed by Israel Aerospace Industries (IAI)- Ramta division.

== Design and Construction ==
The Dabur-class boats have a displacement of 35 tons (45 tons loaded) The ships have a length of 19.80 m (65.0 ft), a beam of 5.80 m (19.0 ft) and a draft of 1.8 m (5 ft 11 in). The ships are crewed by a complement of six to eight officers and ratings. The hull is made of aluminum.

The first Dabur-class vessels were laid down in 1970, following an evaluation process led by Israeli Navy engineer Amnon Saly, who played a key role in identifying and adapting a suitable civilian vessel design for military use. with 12 hulls built by Swiftships in Morgan City Louisiana and 22 more built by IAI-Ramta for a total of 34. The class is designed to be light and is able to be carried overland. They have good rough weather capability, however they were not considered fast enough to cope with current threat capabilities and were phased out in the Israeli Navy for newer ships.

=== Propulsion ===
The class is powered by two diesel General Motors type 12V71TN creating 2,400 hp (1,800 kW) driving two shafts. This gives the ships a maximum speed of 22 kn (41 km/h; 25 mph) and a patrol speed of 18 kn (33 km/h; 21 mph). The effective range at maximum speed is 540 nmi (1,000 km; 620 mi) and at patrol speed, 560 nmi (1,040 km; 640 mi).

=== Armament ===
The boats are armed with two Oerlikon 20 mm cannons, two 12.7 mm machine guns. Two 324 mm (13 in) torpedo tubes are provided for the Mark 46 torpedo and there is space for two racks of depth charges. Carl Gustav recoilless rifles are carried aboard the ships for anti-terrorist purposes.

=== Exports ===
In 1976, five of the class were given to the Christian Lebanese Forces Militia in Lebanon, but they were later returned in 1990. In 1978 Israel sold four of the class to Argentina and four to Nicaragua. In 1984 they sold two to Sri Lanka. In 1991 four more were sold to Fiji and six to Chile. Chile bought four more in 1995, and Nicaragua purchased three more in 1996.

== Service history ==
Dabur-class boats first battle engagements were made in the October 1973 Yom Kippur War. During the war, two Dabur boats attacked an Egyptian commando force in its own port at Marsa Talamat and destroyed speed boats and rubber dinghies just as they were preparing for attacks on Israeli targets in the Sinai Peninsula.

== Operators ==
- Argentina (4 units)
- Chile (3 units)
- Fiji (4 units)
  - RFNS 301 Vai (1991)
  - RFNS 302 Ogo (1991)
  - RFNS 303 Saku (1991)
  - RFNS 304 Saqa (1991)
- Guatemala (2 units)
- Honduras
- Nicaragua (8 to 10 units)

=== Former operators ===
- Israel (decommissioned)
- Lebanese Forces: 5 units, returned to Israel after October 1990.

== Notes ==
| Preceded by - | Dabur class patrol boat | Succeeded by Dvora-class fast patrol boat |
