= Battle of Marsa Talamat =

1973 naval battle of the Yom Kippur War

- Part of the Yom Kippur War
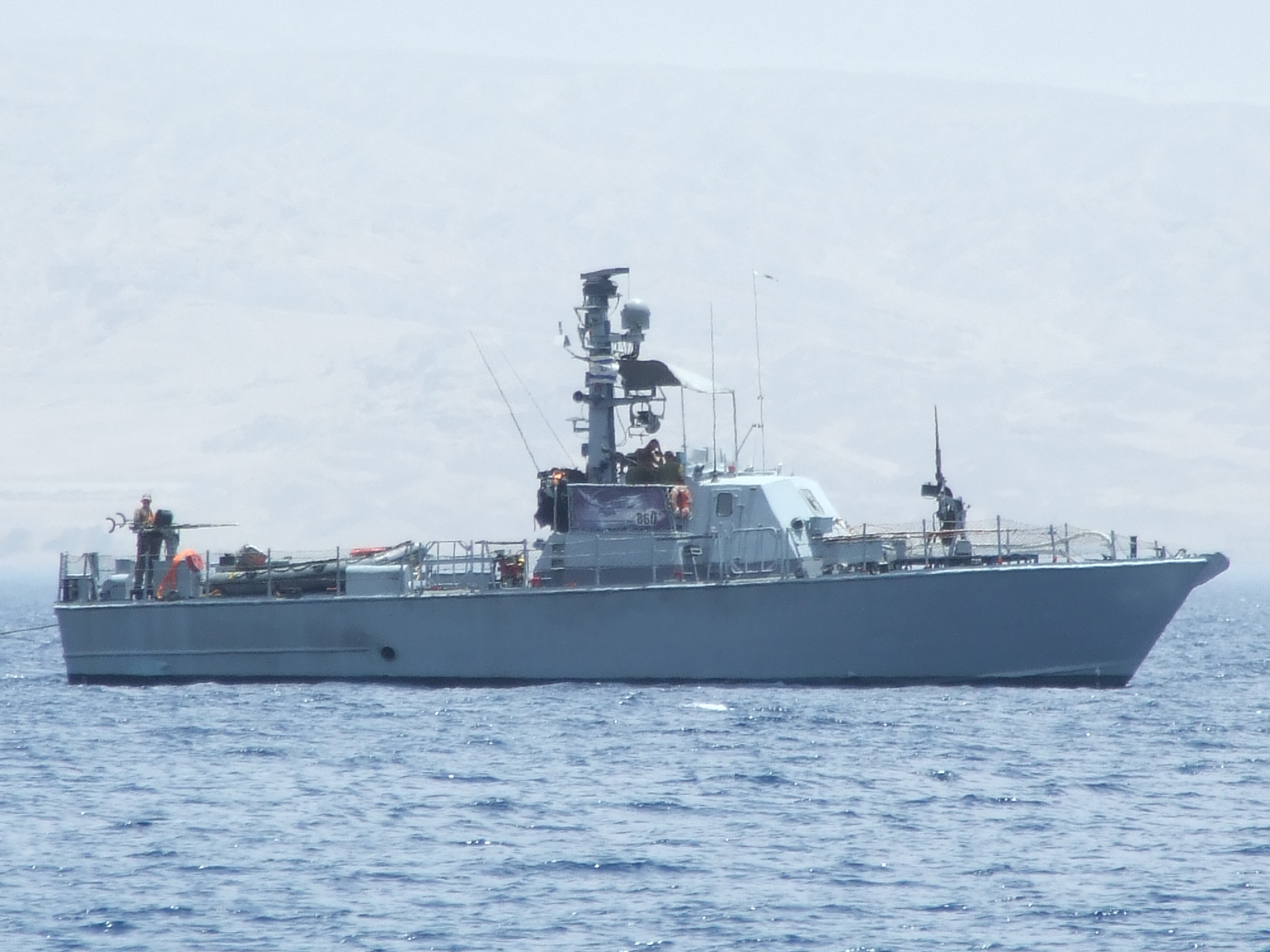
- An Israeli patrol boat in the Gulf of Eilat
Date	October 7, 1973
Location	Gulf of Suez
Result	Israeli victory

Belligerents
Israel	Egypt

Commanders and leaders
Zvi Shahak; Mordechai Dekel	Fouad Zikry

Strength
2 patrol boats	1 patrol boat

Casualties and losses
1 killed 7 wounded 2 patrol boats damaged	1 patrol boat sunk

The Battle of Marsa Talamat (Hebrew: קרב מרסה-תלמאת) was fought between the Israeli Navy and the Egyptian Navy commando forces on October 7, 1973, during the early stages of the Yom Kippur War. It took place in the small Egyptian naval anchorage of Marsa Talamat, in the central sector of the Gulf of Suez.

Two Israeli Dabur class patrol boats of the Squadron 915 were on a routine patrol mission when the Egyptian Army launched a surprise attack into Israeli occupied Sinai. When it became evident that a war had started, the Israeli boats were reassigned to the mission of destroying Egyptian commando boats in order to interrupt Egyptian commando operations in the Gulf of Suez. The Israeli boats located two Egyptian commando boats which were about to depart Marsa Talamat. The Israeli boats attacked, and continued their attack even when both Daburs accidentally ran aground. The Israeli boats managed to retreat after inflicting considerable damage on the Egyptian commandos. For their actions in the battle, three Israeli crewmen were later awarded the Medal of Distinguished Service. The battle was amongst several significant naval battles which dictated the course of the naval war.

== Prelude ==
On the morning of October 6, a force of two Israeli Dabur class Fast Patrol Boats were anchored on buoys at Ras Sudar—then a small Israeli naval anchorage in the northern sector of the Gulf of Suez — part of a routine patrol mission in the Gulf. The Israeli boats, commanded by Navy Lt. Zvika Shahak, had left their base at Sharm al Sheikh a day before. According to Shahak, the intelligence briefing prior to the mission only included a general reference to Egyptian preparation for a possible war.

At 14:10, soon after the Egyptian Army launched its surprise attack (code-named Operation Badr), the Daburs were ordered to leave the anchorage and to patrol along the coast towards the Israeli oil installations at Abu-Rodeis. Once at sea, the Daburs were able to observe significant traffic of Egyptian helicopters headed towards Sinai. At 15:22 the Daburs were ordered to open fire at any Egyptian helicopters or boats, but were unable to engage any of them.

The Israeli boats continued their patrol with no special events until 22:00 when they were ordered to turn south, towards Ras Zafranah, a naval anchorage used by the Egyptian Navy. Their mission was to seek, engage and destroy any enemy boats they could find. The boats arrived at Ras Zafranah anchorage, and found it empty. By that time The Daburs lost communications with their home-base at Sharm, which — as they later learned — had been attacked by Egyptian Raduga KSR-2 cruise missiles. Even though he was not ordered to do so, Shahak decided to inspect Marsa Talamat, an anchorage further south from Ras Zafranah.

== Battle ==
The two Israeli Daburs arrived at Marsa Talamat after 01:00 am on the night of October 6–7. Shahak maneuvered his vessel into the anchorage, while ordering the other to stay outside for cover. Upon entry, Shahak discovered a Bertram class patrol boat and two Zodiacs filled with Egyptian naval commandos in their battle gear and about to depart. The Dabur opened fire first and the Zodiacs sunk immediately. The Dabur then maneuvered to attack the Bertram, and while doing so ran aground about 20 meters (about 65 feet) from the coastline. Both engines stopped. As it ran aground, the Dabur came under heavy gun, rocket and light-arm fire, including from 14.5mm Coastal Guns. Shahak had his men returning fire and at the same time called the second Dabur for support. As the second boat entered the anchorage, it too ran aground. The boats remained aground for over two hours under heavy enemy fire, before they were able to extricate themselves.

During the fight the Bertram was severely damaged but did not sink. The Israelis were only able to sink it by firing a 25 mm flare gun, which ignited the Bertram, causing it to explode.

Once back afloat, the Israeli boats retreated and made their way to Abu-Zaneima where they were met — at 04:22 — by an Israeli Air Force Helicopter which evacuated the wounded. Altogether, one Israeli crewman was killed and seven wounded. The Egyptians lost the Bertram and the two Zodiacs, all loaded with naval commandos about to depart on a mission.

== Aftermath and significance ==
According to Rabinovich the outcome of the Marsa Talamat battle "derailed" the Egyptian "master plan" for southern Sinai. Apparently, the Egyptian forces which were destroyed at Marsa Talamat were intended to reinforce and resupply forces which landed in Sinai the day before. Almog mentions the battle as one of several which enabled Israel to maintain control of the Gulf of Suez throughout the war. According to Almog:

"The Israeli Navy's combat initiatives, combined with the support of ground and air forces, gave Israel full control over the Gulf of Suez and led eventually to the following far-reaching results:

- Dozens of Egyptian-mobilized fishing boats loaded with troops, ammunition, and supplies, ready to invade the Israeli side of the Gulf of Suez and support the helicopter-borne beachhead, were either destroyed or confined to their anchorages.
- Commando troops of the Egyptian beachhead were either killed or captured. This force, landed by helicopter along the Sinai shores, was cut off from its support bases in the Egyptian anchorages of the Gulf of Suez and in mainland Egypt.
- Israel's control of the Gulf of Suez made possible the continued deployment of a surface-to-air missile battery close to the Israeli Ras-Sudr naval base, near the southern end of the Suez Canal. This maneuver deprived the Egyptian Third Field Army of air support and prevented it from moving southward to occupy the southern Sinai.
- The Israeli Navy assisted in tightening the blockade around the besieged Egyptian Third Field Army from the southern flank. This flank bordered on the northern part of the Gulf of Suez, completing the encirclement."

Following the battle, three Israeli crewmen were awarded the Medal of Distinguished Service: Zvi Shahak, who commanded the operation; 2nd Lt. Ami Segev, an officer on Shahak's Dabur who kept fighting even after being severely wounded; and Staff-Sergeant Shalom Nachmani, Shahak's Dabur chief mechanic. Able to patch the boat's damaged engines and restart them, Nachmani was in fact the one responsible for the boat's recovery after it ran aground. A fourth member of the crew, 2nd Lt. Nimrod Erez, who had fired the flare gun at the Bertram, was awarded the Chief Of Staff Citation.
