= Type 0105 gunboat =

Class overview
- Operators: People's Liberation Army Navy
- Planned: 4
- Building: 4
- Completed: 4
- Retired: 4

General characteristics
- Type: Gunboat
- Installed power: Internal combustion engine
- Propulsion: 4 M50F-2 Diesel engine @ 1,200 hp (895 kW) ea
- Armament: 25.4 mm (1.00 in) guns

Type 0105 gunboat was a type of gunboat developed by China for the People's Liberation Army Navy (PLAN) in the late 1950s.

In 1958, PLAN demanded the need of more powerful gunboats and ordered the design to be carried out by individual fleets/bases. The new gunboats must have greater displacement, endurance/range, and firepower than the 75 ton gunboat in service. PLAN No. 4810 Factory of Lushunkou base completed design of Type 0105 gunboat and a total of three went into the service.

In 1960, China decided to produce Soviet M-1 gas turbine engine. Harbin Marine Steam and Turbine Research Institute, or more commonly known as the 703rd Institute of China Shipbuilding Industry Corporation (CSIC) was tasked with design and later reverse engineering after Sino-Soviet split, with Wen Xue-You (闻雪友) as the general designer of the gas turbine. The reverse engineered Soviet M-1 gas turbine was given the Chinese designation Type 404, and the manufacturing of this Chinese version was assigned to Shanghai Steam Turbine Plant (上海汽轮机厂, STP), the predecessor and subsidiary of Shanghai Electric Power Generation Group (上海电气集团股份有限公司, SEPG). STP had never produced any gas turbines before, but nonetheless completed the first sample by 1960, and test begun the following year. Due to the political turmoil in China at the time, namely, the Great Leap Forward, the program was plagued with problems, and it took several years to correct the problems, and it was not until three years later in the beginning of 1964 when the prototype finally meet all design parameters originally specified. In March 1964, the first Type 404 was authorized to be installed on a Type 0105 boat for sea trials.

A Type 0105 with hull number 595 was selected to be redesigned to incorporate Type 404 gas turbine engine, and the general designer for the boat redesign was Chen Xie-Wen (陈协文), with Li Meng-Xuan (李荫轩) as the general designer of the propulsion system. The construction of the gas turbine powered boat was assigned to Jiangnan Shipyard, and the boat was handed to PLAN in 1967. Due to the significant weight change, original weaponry had to be adjusted and additional measure had to be taken into consideration for stability. The first stage of sea trials was plagued with problems, starting with the gas turbine engine could not start, so air inlet had to be redesigned. A much more serious problem was that some of the components broke apart and damaged the engine, which could only be taken out at Jiangnan Shipyard, so the boat had to be towed back to the shipyard for repair. As a result, the aluminum alloy used to make these components was replaced by steel, and frame that supports the components was also redesigned. In addition, manufacturing technique was also modified, with arc welding replaced the original spot welding.

Although the gas turbine engine itself encountered numerous difficulties in the first stage of the sea trials, other subsystems of the boat were successful, such as the redesigned main gun system developed by the 713rd Research Institute of CSIC, and the stabilization system developed by the 704th Research Institute of CSIC. After half a decade redesign and rework, the second stage of the sea trials begun with the new Type 404 gas turbine engine October 1969. Extensive trials were conducted, including sea trials from Shanghai to Dalian and Qingdao, as well as riverine trials in inland waterway from Shanghai to Wuhan in the Yangtze River. In November 1970, the sea trial concluded and the boat formally reentered service with PLAN in 1971. However, due to the political turmoil in China at the time, namely, Cultural Revolution, logistic and technical support could not keep up with the demand of the gas turbine engine, and the boat was retired as a combatant in 1977, and subsequently converted to a dispatch boat numbered Dong-Jiao (东交) 61, and served until mid-1980s until its final retirement from PLAN.
