= Yulin-class gunboat =

Class overview
- Operators: People's Liberation Army Navy; Congo Navy; Royal Cambodian Navy; Tanzania Naval Command
- Succeeded by: Beihai class gunboat
- Built: 1964-1968
- Completed: Approx 100

General characteristics
- Type: Gunboat
- Displacement: 10 tonnes (9.8 long tons; 11 short tons)
- Length: 13 m (42 ft 8 in)
- Beam: 2.9 m (9 ft 6 in)
- Draft: 1.1 m (3 ft 7 in)
- Propulsion: 1 × diesel engine, 300 hp (224 kW), 3 shafts
- Speed: 20 knots (37 km/h; 23 mph)
- Armament: 2 × 12.7 mm (0.50 in) machine guns (1×2)

Yulin-class gunboats were gunboats of the People's Republic of China's People's Liberation Army Navy. They first entered service in the 1960s with approximately 100 produced, but had been completely taken out of active service by the late 1990s, and were transferred to law enforcement agencies. However, just like the Shantou, Huangpu and Beihai classes that were transferred for law enforcement adaptation, these obsolete and aging boats were not satisfactory in their new roles due to their low maximum speed, sometime as low as 10 knots, which was not sufficient to catch the smugglers' high-speed motorboats. As a result, these boats were subsequently transferred again, this time to reserves, subordinated to naval militia in various Military Maritime Districts in China as training boats and port security and patrol boats within the confines of the harbors. Increasingly, the class is assigned to ferry duties.

Though this class is relatively in better condition than the Shantou, Huangpu and Beihai classes because they are preserved and maintained on land, like the Shantou, Huangpu and Beihai classes, as the new class of port security and patrol boats enters service, the Yulin class is increasingly being converted, mothballed and eventually scrapped.

Just like the Shantou, Huangpu and Beihai classes, many of the surviving units are being converted to target drones controlled by larger boats such as those mentioned, and thus reactivated into active service as minor support auxiliaries. When the drones are in operation, crew departs the boat.

== Former Operators ==
- People's Liberation Army Navy
- Congolese Navy - 4 boats transferred in 1966
- Cambodian Navy - 3 boats transferred in 1968
- Tanzanian Navy - 4 boats transferred in 1966
