= Shantou-class gunboat =

Chinese gunboat

Class overview
- Operators: People's Liberation Army Navy
- Succeeded by: Type 062 gunboat
- Built: 1955-1960s
- In service: 1955-1990s in military service

General characteristics
- Type: Gunboat
- Displacement: 77.4 tonnes (76.2 long tons; 85.3 short tons)
- Length: 25.21 m (82 ft 9 in)
- Beam: 6.06 m (19 ft 11 in)
- Draft: 1.8 m (5 ft 11 in)
- Propulsion: 2 × 3D12 diesel engines, 300 hp (224 kW); 2 × M50 diesel engines, 1,200 hp (895 kW); 4 × FANG shafts
- Speed: 22.4 knots (41.5 km/h; 25.8 mph)
- Range: 770 mi (1,240 km) at 11.4 knots (21.1 km/h; 13.1 mph)
- Complement: 17
- Sensors & processing systems: 1 × navigational or surface search radar
- Armament: 4 × 37 mm (1.5 in) guns (2×2); 2 × 14.5 mm (0.57 in) heavy machine guns; 2 × depth charge rails

The Shantou-class gunboat was a Chinese-built gunboat of the People's Republic of China's People's Liberation Army Navy. Known in the United States as the "Swatow" class gunboat, it was based on the Soviet P-6 class torpedo boat. The boat is designated as Type 55A (55 Jia Xing, 55甲型). Instead of being wooden hulled, and having torpedoes as the main armament, the Shantou class is steel-hulled, with guns as the main armament. The Shantou (or Swatow) is the predecessor of the Type 062 gunboat, or more commonly known as the Shanghai-I & II class.

== Service history ==
Entering service from 1955 through 1960, these vessels were completely removed from naval service by the mid-1990s and were transferred to civilian law enforcement agencies. However, just like the Beihai, Huangpu, and Yulin class gunboats which had been transferred to law enforcement agencies, these obsolete and aging boats were not satisfactory in their new civilian roles, due largely to their low maximum speed (10 knots), which was not sufficient to catch the smugglers' high-speed motorboats. As a result, these boats were subsequently transferred again, this time to the reserves; or subordinated to naval militias in various Military Maritime Districts in China as training boats or harbor patrol boats. Like the aforementioned gunboats before it, the Swatow class, arriving for its new role(s), will likewise see increased conversions, some mothballing, and then eventually being scrapped.

Again, as with previous units (vessels), many of the surviving boats are being converted to naval auxiliaries, such as firing (gunnery) range support craft, target control boat (remote controlling of target drones), as well as being target drones themselves.

Despite the small number of scientific instruments they carried, most of the range support boats in the PLAN also shoulder the responsibility of inshore surveying, regardless of their limitations. Originally, the majority of the hydrographic surveys had been conducted by civilian fishing vessels, which had additional scientific equipment, naval, and governmental crews on board. However, since the reform and opening up, and the depletion of the fishery resources, the civilian fishing vessels must venture much further out into open ocean on extended voyages, thus were no longer available for coastal or inland water survey operations. Duties which had previously been assigned under the planned economy era in China prior to the economic reform. Consequently, the Chinese Navy must come up with their own solutions to meet these new demands, and the conversion of obsolete gunboats was one of the answers: although many of these vessels can no longer venture into the open sea, nor reach the speeds that they once could, they are still reliable enough to perform the duties of low speed inshore surveying tasks within the confines of river mouths and bays of Chinese coastlines.

Contrary to the commonly held, but erroneous belief that the Chinese Navy is following the tradition of maintaining weaponry on many of its auxiliaries (though there is certainly some degree of this), the retention was primarily for economic reasons: to avoid conversion costs, the original armament(s) were retained unless they were no longer serviceable. Consequently, many of the range support, surveying boats, and other auxiliary craft still maintain some of their former fighting capabilities.

This class was exported to the Democratic Republic of Vietnam and was in service with its navy during the Vietnam War, including service at the time of the Gulf of Tonkin incident (see Edwin E. Moise, Tonkin Gulf and the Escalation of the Vietnam War, University of North Carolina Press, Chapel Hill 1996:701-1.

== Bibliography ==
- Moise, Edwin E. Tonkin Gulf and the Escalation of the Vietnam War. (1996) The University of North Carolina Press. ISBN 0-8078-2300-7.
