= Type 037 corvette =

Submarine chaser class of the People's Liberation Army Navy

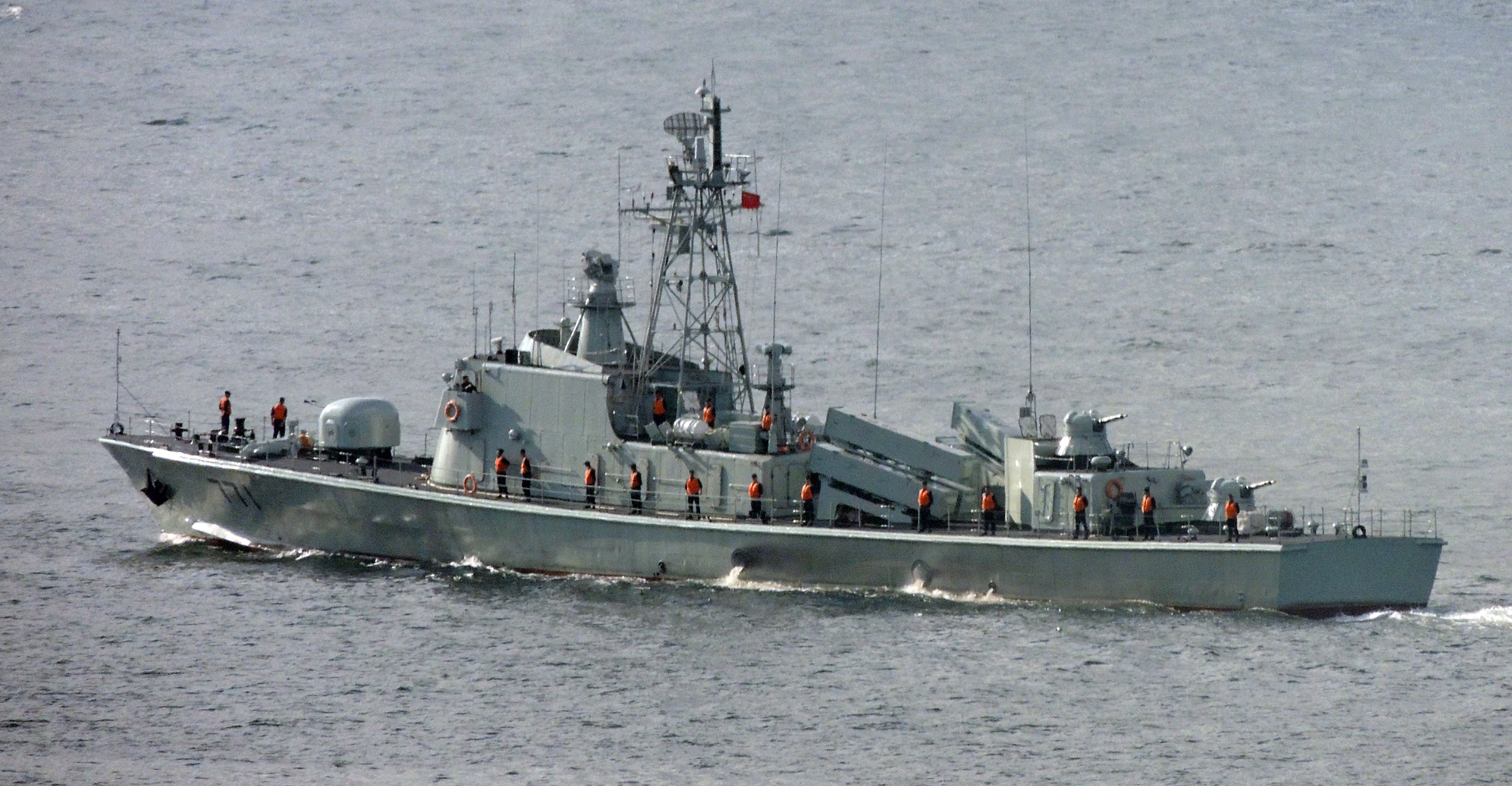
Type 037II missile boat

The Type 037 corvette is a series 400–500 ton corvette type classes in service with the People's Liberation Army Navy. Unlike western navies, the People's Liberation Army Navy does not have dedicated patrol boats in its inventory. Instead, a large variety of corvette type classes, in the form of missile boats and submarine chasers fulfill the tasks of patrolling China's territorial waters. The Egyptian Navy operates eight vessels.

== Type 037 Hainan-class submarine chaser ==
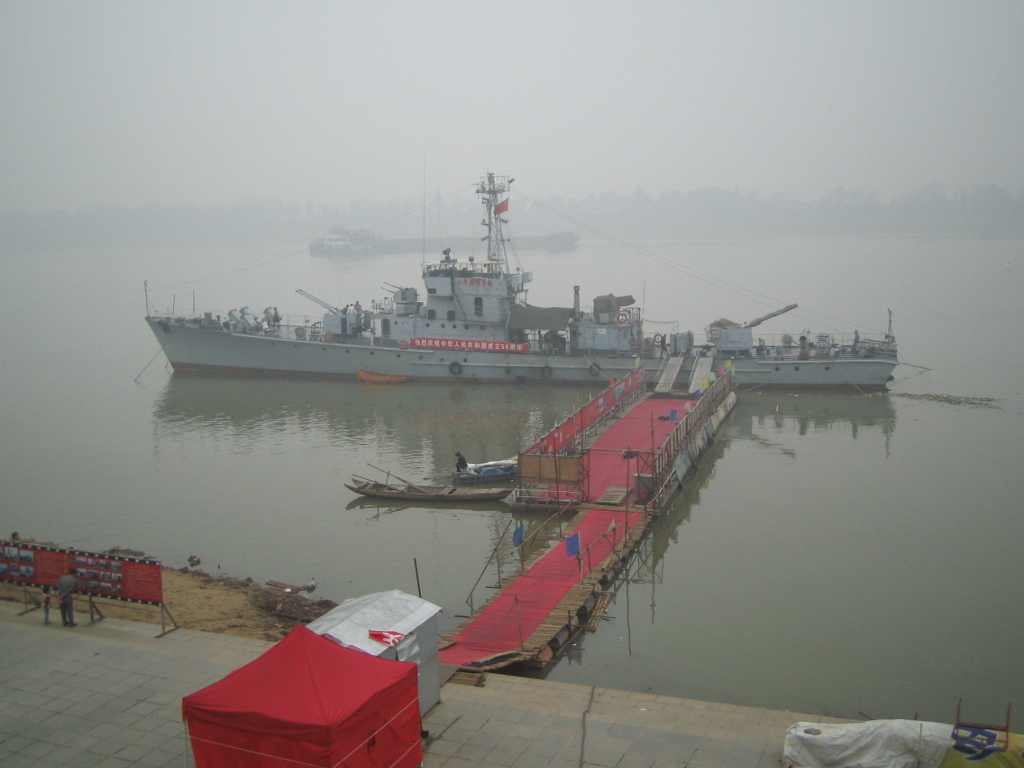
- Hainan-class submarine chaser

Class overview
- Name: Hainan class
- Operators: People's Liberation Army Navy; Bangladesh Navy; Egyptian Navy; Korean People's Navy; Myanmar Navy; Pakistan Navy
- Preceded by: Haizhui class
- Succeeded by: type 056 / Jiangdao class
- Built: 1964–1982
- In commission: 1964–present
- Completed: 100+
- Active: 67 (PLAN)
- Lost: 1 (North Korean)

General characteristics
- Type: Submarine chaser
- Displacement: 430 tonnes (420 long tons; 470 short tons)
- Length: 58.77 m (192 ft 10 in)
- Beam: 7.2 m (23 ft 7 in)
- Draft: 2.2 m (7 ft 3 in)
- Propulsion: 4 × diesel engines, 8,800 hp (6,562 kW); 4 × shafts
- Speed: 30.5 knots (56.5 km/h; 35.1 mph)
- Range: 2,000 nmi (3,700 km) at 14 knots (26 km/h; 16 mph)
- Complement: 70
- Sensors & processing systems: 1 × Type 351 Radar "Pot Head" surface search radar; 1 × Soviet Tamir-II hull mounted or SJD-3 telescoping high frequency active sonar
- Armament: 4 × Chinese Type 66 57 mm (2.2 in) guns (2×2); 4 × Chinese Type 61 25 mm (0.98 in) guns (2×2); 4 × RBU-1200 or Type 81 ASW rocket launchers; 2 × BMB-2 ASW mortars; 2 × depth charge rails with more than 20 depth charges, and mine rails (10 mines total)

The Type 037 submarine chaser (NATO reporting name: Hainan class), is a class of submarine chaser of the People's Liberation Army Navy. It was designed by China to replace the Soviet S.O.-1 class submarine chaser.

In addition to anti-submarine warfare missions, these simple yet effective units are also capable of a wide variety of missions such as mine laying and patrol. These boats were first equipped with Soviet Tamir-11 (MG-11, NATO reporting name: Stag Hoof) hull-mounted sonars which had a typical range of 3 km (1.9 mi), but in the 1970s, they were superseded by domestic Chinese SJD-3 sonar, which is modification of original MG-11: instead of being fixed to the hull, SJD-3 has a telescoping arm, so when not in use, the sonar is stored in the hull, and when deployed, the sonar is lowered into water several meter below the hull, thus increased detection range by avoiding baffles generated by the hull.

During the Sino-South Vietnamese naval clashes on 19 January 1974, two boats of this class, # 281 & # 282 (two out of the eight total in Chinese inventory) participated in the latter half of the battle, the fastest Chinese units in the conflict. Originally the units were waiting at Yongxing Island, but due to the problem of communications, they were not notified until the battle was already in progress.

Over 100 were built, but as newer submarine chasers enter service, this class is steadily being decommissioned. A number of these ships have subsequently been exported to Bangladesh, Egypt, North Korea, Pakistan and Myanmar. On October 13, 2013, a North Korean Type 037 was lost off Wonsan with the loss of at least nineteen of her crew. She may have been in collision with another Korean People's Navy ship.

It is understood that four Type 037 submarine chasers were modified and became known as the Type 037 Mod (NATO: Haijiu class).

In PLAN service, pennant numbers as follows: 601－610, 622, 625－629, 639, 650, 673, 674, 677, 681－687, 689－692, 694－696, 698－709 and 721－742

== Type 037 Haijiu-class submarine chaser ==
Class overview
- Operators: People's Liberation Army Navy
- Preceded by: Type 037 (Hainan-class)
- Succeeded by: Type 037I (Haiqing-class)
- Completed: 4

General characteristics
- Type: Submarine chaser
- Displacement: 490 long tons (500 t)
- Length: 64 m (210 ft 0 in)
- Beam: 7.2 m (23 ft 7 in)
- Draft: 2.2 m (7 ft 3 in)
- Propulsion: 4 × diesel engines, 8,800 hp (6,562 kW); 4 × shafts
- Speed: 28 knots (52 km/h; 32 mph)
- Range: 750 nmi (1,390 km) at 18 knots (33 km/h; 21 mph)
- Complement: 72
- Crew: 70
- Sensors & processing systems: I-band Pot Head surface search radar; I-band Round Ball fire control radar; Chinese copy of Thomson-Sintra medium frequency SS-12 VDS sonar
- Armament: 4 × Chinese Type 66 57 mm (2.2 in) guns (2 × 2); 2 × AK-230 30 mm (1.2 in) AA guns; 4 × RBU-1200 ASW mortars; 2 × depth charge rails with 18 depth charges

The Haijiu class submarine chasers are two (possibly four) modified versions of the Hainan class submarine chasers (Type 037) of the People's Liberation Army Navy.

The main difference is that four ASW rocket launchers have replaced the original two ASW mortars. The biggest improvement, however, is in the sonar system. Original SJD-3 sonar on earlier Type 037 class submarine chaser is replaced by a 13 kHz (2 frequency ranges) French Thomson Sintra SS-12/DIP 12 hull mounted (HM)/variable depth sonar (VDS). DIP 12, the VDS version weigh 4 tons and has a 200-meter cable with towing speed of 16 kn, and the range is selectable at 2, 4, 8 and 16 km respectively. However, during deployment, it was discovered that the endurance of this class is limited and the capabilities of SS/DIP 12 sonar system could not be fully exploited. There is some disagreement over the type designation of this class, some sources claim it is Type 037I, while others claim it is Type 037 Mod (for modified or modernized).

== Type 037I Haiqing-class submarine chaser ==
Class overview
- Name: Haiqing class
- Operators: People's Liberation Army Navy; Sri Lanka Navy
- Preceded by: Type 037 (Hainan class)
- Succeeded by: Type 056 corvette
- In commission: 1982–present
- Completed: 27
- Active: 27

General characteristics
- Type: Submarine chaser
- Displacement: 478 tonnes (470 long tons)
- Length: 62.8 m (206 ft 0 in)
- Beam: 7.2 m (23 ft 7 in)
- Draft: 2.4 m (7 ft 10 in)
- Propulsion: 4 × Chinese PR 230ZC diesel engines at 4,000 hp (2,983 kW) with 4 shafts
- Speed: 28 knots (52 km/h; 32 mph)
- Range: 1,300 nmi (2,400 km) at 15 kn (28 km/h)
- Complement: 71
- Sensors & processing systems: 1 × Type 723 surface search radar; Chinese copy of French Thomson-Sintra medium frequency SS-12 VDS sonar
- Armament: 4 × Type 76A 37 mm gun (2 × 2); 4 × Type 69 14.5 mm heavy machine guns (2 × 2); 1 × Type 87 6-tubed ASW mortar

The Type 037I submarine chaser (NATO reporting name: Haiqing class), is a follow-on class of submarine chasers to the preceding Type 037-class of the People's Liberation Army Navy. There are two designations of this class, the base Type 037I and the improved Type 037IS. The earlier boats were built by the Qiuxin Shipyard of Shanghai, and later by Huangpu Shipyard.

The ships are armed with two 6-tubed anti-submarine mortar launchers. The earlier boats are fitted with two manually operated twin-barrel 37 mm guns, but they have been replaced by two automatic 37 mm guns on the later variants. They also have various other mounted heavy machine guns for patrol duty. These weapons focus on a general-purpose patrol boat, with only a limited anti-submarine capability.

One Haiqing class submarine chaser was purchased by the Sri Lanka Navy and was commissioned in 1996 as SLNS Parakramabahu (P351), serving in the Sri Lankan Civil War.

== Type 037IG Houxin-class missile boat ==
Class overview
- Name: Houxin class
- Builders: Qiuxing and Huangpu Shipyard
- Operators: People's Liberation Army Navy; Myanmar Navy; Yemeni Navy
- Preceded by: Type 021
- Succeeded by: Type 037II (Houjian class)
- Built: 1991–1999
- In commission: 1991–present
- Completed: 26 (20 PLAN + 6 Myanmar)
- Active: 9 (3 PLAN, 6 Myanmar)
- Retired: 17
- Preserved: 2

General characteristics
- Type: Missile boat
- Displacement: 478 tons
- Length: 62.8 m (206 ft)
- Beam: 7.2 m (24 ft)
- Draft: 2.4 m (7 ft 10 in)
- Installed power: 2 Chinese PR 230ZC diesel engines at 4,000 hp (3,000 kW)
- Propulsion: 4 shafts
- Speed: 28 knots (52 km/h; 32 mph)
- Range: 750 nmi (1,390 km; 860 mi) at 18 knots (33 km/h; 21 mph)
- Complement: 71
- Sensors & processing systems: Surface search radar: 1 × I-band Type 352 (Square Tie); Navigational radar: 1 × I-band Type 723; Fire control radar: 1 × I-band Type 347 (Rice Lamp)
- Armament: Anti-ship missiles: 4 × C-801/802/803; Guns: 4 × Type 76A 37 mm gun (2 x 2); 4 × Type 69 14.5 mm heavy machine guns (2 x 2)

The Type 037IG missile boat (NATO: Houxin class) were first built by Qiuxing and Huangpu Shipyard from 1991 through 1999 for the People's Liberation Army Navy (PLAN). In addition to the PLAN, 6 were exported to Myanmar: 2 in 1995, 2 in July 1996, and 2 in late 1997. This boat is the anti-ship version of the Type 037 submarine chasers, armed with missiles rather than torpedoes. It was also used as a cheaper alternative to the Type 037II class.

According to the Office of Naval Intelligence, multiple Type 037IG missile boats were retired.

Type 037IG missile boats in PLAN service
| Pennant number | Name | Namesake | Launched | Commissioned | Fleet | Status |
|---|---|---|---|---|---|---|
| 651 | Laiyang (莱阳) | Laiyang | | | | |
| 652 | Laixi (莱西) | Laixi | | | | |
| 653 | Qufu (曲阜) | Qufu | | | | |
| 654 | Chengwu (成武) | Chengwu county | | | | |
| 655 | Rushan (乳山) | Rushan | | | | |
| 656 | Shouguang (寿光) | Shouguang | | | | |
| 751 | Jinsha (金沙) | Jinsha County | | | | |
| 752 | Yuqing (余庆) | Yuqing County | May 1991 | January 1992 | | Retired in August 2014. Preserved at the National Maritime Museum of China. |
| 753 | Dong'an (东安) | Dong'an County | | | | |
| 754 | Linwu (临武) | Linwu County | | | | |
| 755 | Chaoyang (潮陽) | Chaoyang, Shantou | | | | |
| 756 | Chenghai (澄海) | Chenghai, Shantou | | | | |
| 757 | Gutian (古田) | Gutian County | | | | |
| 758 | Yongchun (永春) | Yongchun County | | | | |
| 759 | Fuqing (福清) | Fuqing | | | | |
| 760 | Changle (长乐) | Changle, Fuzhou | | | | |
| 764 | Longyan (龍巖) | Longyan | | | | |
| 765 | Shanghang (上杭) | Shanghang County | | | | Retired. Museum ship at the Shanghang County Linjiang Defense Education Park (25.042522°N 116.396052°E) |
| 766 | Fuqing (福清) | Fuqing | | | | |
| 767 | Fu'an (福安) | Fu'an | | | | |

== Type 037II Houjian-class missile boat ==
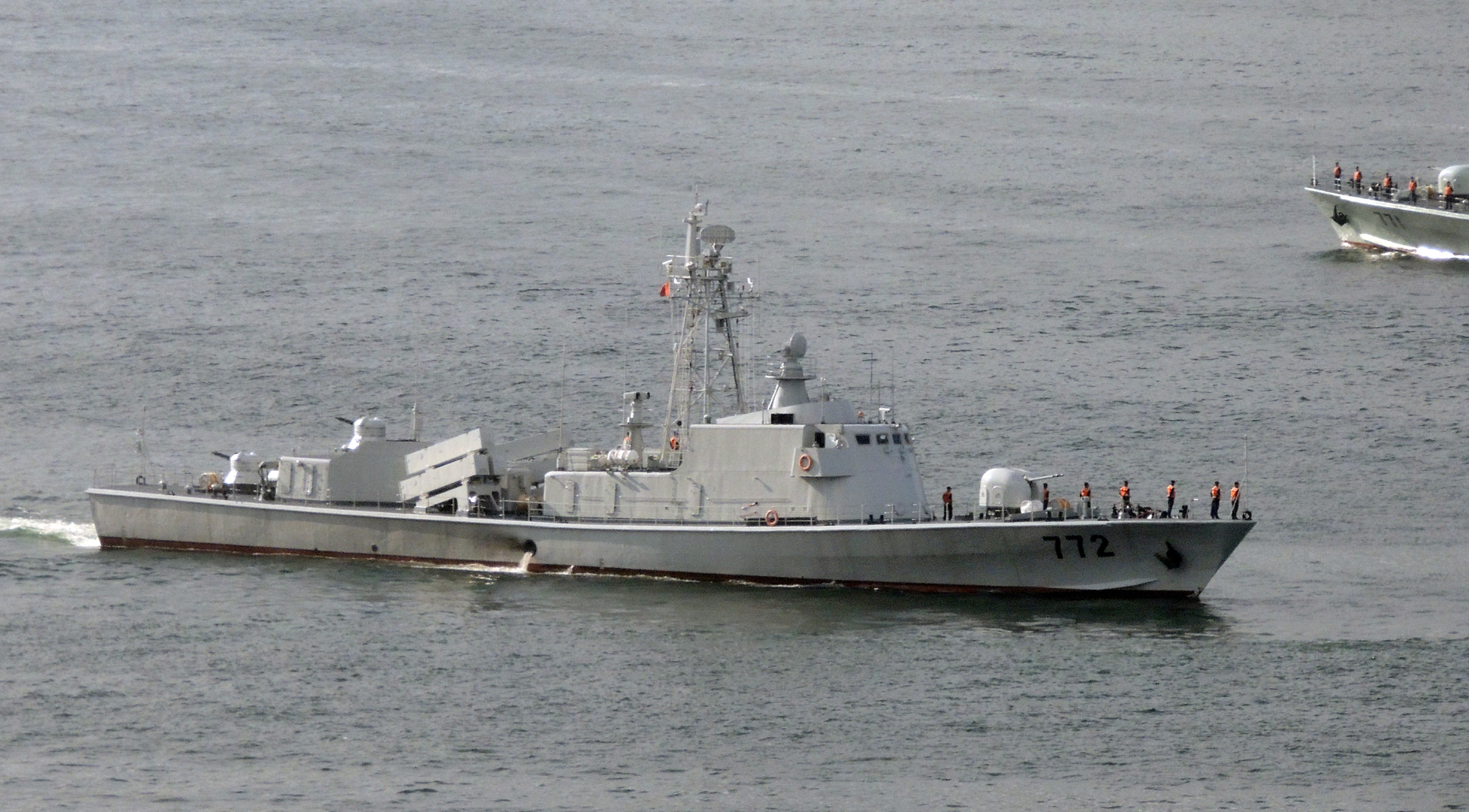

Class overview
- Name: Houjian class
- Operators: People's Liberation Army Navy; Pakistan Navy
- Preceded by: Type 037IG (Houxin class)
- Succeeded by: Type 022 missile boat
- Subclasses: Azmat class
- Built: 1991–2001
- In commission: 1991–present
- Planned: 10
- Building: 1
- Completed: 9
- Active: 8
- Retired: 1
- Preserved: 1

General characteristics
- Type: Missile boat
- Displacement: 520 tonnes
- Propulsion: 2 x SEMT-Pielstick 12 PA6 280 diesel engines at 1,584 hp (1,181 kW) with 3 shafts
- Speed: 30+ knots
- Range: 1,800 nmi (3,300 km; 2,100 mi) at 18 knots (33 km/h; 21 mph)
- Crew: 75
- Sensors & processing systems: Type 348G tracking radar; Type 348S search radar; Type 765 (I-band); Type 88C EOTS
- Armament: 1 x Type 76 twin 37 mm naval gun (Only on Lianjiang); 2 x Type 69 twin 30 mm; 6 x C-101/YJ-1

The Type 037II missile boat (NATO: Houjian class) is a missile equipped corvette built by Huangpu Shipyard of Guangzhou for the People's Liberation Army Navy. A total of six vessels were delivered to the PLA Navy and form the main naval defence force currently stationed in Hong Kong.

The original one-off design was by an American company, the H-3 group, the design was for a 245-ton boat, equipped with Harpoon SSMs, OTO Melara 76 mm guns, gas turbine engines and waterjet propulsion. However, this specifications was too complicated for China, and a major redesign was begun, resulting in a boat with C-801 SSMs, diesel engines and propellers instead. The OTO Melara 76 mm gun was retained in the revised design, called in 1988 the EH-3D (and in 1996 the 520T), but failed to survive the cooling of relations with the West following the Tiananmen Square protests of 1989 and the resulting end of Western participation in Chinese military projects.

The first vessel was built in 1990, as a technology demonstrator and proof-of-concept trials vessel, it fired its first C-801 missile in a 1995 exercise. Three more vessels were built in 1995/96. However, due to technological difficulties (particularly with regards the license produced SEMT diesel engines), high price, and over sophisticated design compared to the PLAN standard, further production was terminated. A fifth vessel, hull number 774, was built in 2001, as another proof of concept vessel for modified SEMT engines with new turbochargers and license produced Russian AK-176 76 mm gun.

Four vessels were built for rotation, with two vessels being deployed to Hong Kong at a time. The fifth vessel (Lianjiang (774)) has been involved in two navigation incidents. The first time in 2001 whilst on a pre-delivery test it was nearly sunk after a collision with a fast ferry servicing the Hong Kong-Guangzhou route. In June 2006, it collided again, this time with a Chinese freighter, and sank immediately, 13 servicemen going missing in the incident. The vessel was later refloated and sent to the shipyard for repair.

The Type 037II's twin 30mm cannons are controlled by the Type 88C Electro-optical targeting system which has an infrared seeker and automatic tracker along with a laser rangefinder.

The Type 037II's tracking radar is the Type 348G tracking radar while its search radar is the Type 348S search radar.

The Azmat-class vessels in service with the Pakistani Navy are based on this class. In 2012 Bangladesh contracted for two slightly modified ships.

Ships in PLAN service:

| Ship | Pennant number | Namesake | Laid down | Launched | Commissioned | Fate |
|---|---|---|---|---|---|---|
| Yangjiang (阳江) | 770 | Yangjiang | | | | |
| Shunde (顺德) | 771 | Shunde District | | 1995 | | |
| Nanhai (南海) | 772 | Nanhai District | 1992 | 1995 | | Retired on October 15, 2021; Became museum ship in Jieshou Municipal Museum along the Shaying River on November 16, 2021. It is currently at Shaying river Xuzhai pier.(33.226579°N 115.403005°E) |
| Panyu (番禺) | 773 | Panyu District | | | | |
| Lianjiang (廉江) | 774 | Lianjiang | | | | |
| Xinhui (新会) | 775 | Xinhui | | | | |

== Export operators ==
=== Hainan ===
Bangladesh

- Bangladesh Navy – 2 boats acquired in 1982-1985.

Egypt

- Egyptian Navy – 6 boats acquired in 1983-1984.

Myanmar

- Myanmar Navy – 10 boats acquired in 1991-1993.

North Korea

- Korean People's Navy – 6 boats acquired in 1975-1978.

Pakistan

- Pakistan Navy – 4 boats acquired in 1976-1980, all decommissioned.

=== Haiqing ===
Namibia

- Namibian Navy – 2 acquired in 2017.

Sri Lanka

- Sri Lanka Navy – 1 acquired in 1995, damaged and subsequently decommissioned.

Tanzania

- Tanzania Naval Command – 2 acquired in 2015.

=== Houxin ===
Myanmar

- Myanmar Navy – 6 acquired in 1995-1997.

== See also ==
- Type 056 corvette
- Type 062 gunboat
- Ching Chiang-class patrol ship
- Cyclone-class patrol ship
