= Huangpu-class gunboat =

Chinese navy vessel

Class overview
- Operators: People's Liberation Army Navy

General characteristics
- Type: Gunboat
- Displacement: 50 tonnes (49 long tons; 55 short tons)
- Length: 24.64 m (80 ft 10 in)
- Beam: 4.25 m (13 ft 11 in)
- Draft: 1.16 m (3 ft 10 in)
- Propulsion: 2 × Gray Marine 6-71 Diesel Engine, 225 hp (168 kW)
- Speed: 13 knots (24 km/h; 15 mph)
- Range: 990 mi (1,590 km) at 12 knots (22 km/h; 14 mph)
- Sensors & processing systems: 1 × navigational radar
- Armament: 1 × 37 mm (1.5 in) guns; 1 × 20 mm (0.79 in) guns; 2 × 12.7 mm (0.50 in) guns

The Huangpu-class gunboat were gunboats of the People's Republic of China's People's Liberation Army Navy, with production first begun at Jiangnan Shipyard on January 20, 1953, after request was submitted in October 1952.. These boats were designated as Type 53A (53 Jia Xing, 53甲型), and a slightly modified version was designated as Type 54A (54 Jia Xing, 54甲型). They entered service in the 1950s and had been completely taken out of active service by the early 2000s and were transferred to law enforcement agencies. However, just like the Shantou, Beihai and Yulin classes that were transferred for law enforcement adaptation, these obsolete and aging boats are not satisfactory in their new roles due to their low maximum speed, sometime as low as 10 knots, which was not fast enough to catch the smugglers’ high speed motorboats. As a result, these boats were subsequently transferred again, this time to reserves, subordinated to naval militia in various Military Maritime Districts in China as training boats and port security / patrol boats within the confines of the harbors.

The new design incorporated a low superstructure fore and aft, providing additional accommodations for police or troops. A lightly armed version with 25 mm main guns received NATO reporting name Beihai class. This advantage combined with their later completion time in comparison to Shantou, Beihai and Yulin classes have made this class more active in the reserve than the others in the naval militia, However, like the Shantou, Beihai and Yulin classes, as the new class of port security patrol boats entering service, the Huangpu class is increasingly being converted, mothballed and eventually scrapped.

Just like the Shantou, Beihai and Yulin classes, many of the surviving units are being converted to naval range support boats and target drones and thus reactivated into active service as minor support auxiliaries. It can be either used as a target control boat to remotely control the converted drones, or as a drone itself. When the drone is in operation, the crew departs the boat.

Most of the range support boats in the PLAN also shoulder the responsibility of inshore surveying and these converted boats are no exceptions, despite the little scientific instruments they carried. The reason is that originally, majority of the hydrographic surveys were conducted by civilian fishing vessels with the additional scientific equipment, naval and governmental crews on board. However, since the reform and opening up and the depletion of the fishery resources, the civilian fishing vessels must venture much further out into open ocean and staying longer at the sea, thus could no longer afford to stay in home waters and performing the heavy inshore surveying duties previously assigned under the planned economy era in China prior to the Chinese economic reform. Consequently, the PLAN must come up with their own means to meet such huge demand, and converting former gunboats was one of the answers: although these boats can no longer venture out into open ocean and cruise at their maximum speed like they used to do, they are still quite capable of low speed inshore surveying tasks within the confines of river mouths and bays of Chinese coastlines.

Contrary to the commonly held but erroneous belief that the PLAN is following the tradition of having weaponry on most of its auxiliaries (though there is certainly some degree of this), the retention of weaponry on these converted boats were mainly to save money: in order to reduce the conversion cost, the original weaponry was retained unless it was absolutely necessary to remove the weapons, thus most of the converted range support and surveying boats still maintained most of their original fighting capability.
