= Type 022 missile boat =

Ship class in the Chinese People's Liberation Army Navy

- Drawing of Chinese Fast Attack Craft 2208 - Type-022 Houbei-Class

Class overview
- Name: Type 022
- Builders: Hudong-Zhonghua Shipbuilding, Shanghai
- Operators: People's Liberation Army Navy
- Preceded by: Komar-class missile boat; Type 021 missile boat
- Cost: Estimates vary from $14.5 million over $40 million up to $50 million per boat
- Built: 2004–2009
- In commission: 2004–present
- Completed: 60
- Active: 60 (approx.)

General characteristics
- Displacement: 224 long tons (228 t) full load
- Length: 42.6 m (139 ft 9 in)
- Beam: 12.2 m (40 ft 0 in)
- Draught: 1.5 m (4 ft 11 in)
- Decks: 1
- Propulsion: 2 x diesel engines generating 6,865 hp (5,119 kW); 4 x Kamewae waterjet propulsors
- Speed: 40 knots (74 km/h; 46 mph)
- Complement: 12
- Sensors & processing systems: Type 348 (LR66) surface search radar; Navigation radar (I band); Optronic director
- Armament: 8 x YJ-83 anti-ship missiles; 1 x FLS-1 MANPADS launcher; 1 × 30 mm AK-630 CIWS

The Type 022 (NATO designation: Houbei class) is a class of Chinese catamaran missile boat. It entered service with the People's Liberation Army Navy (PLAN) in 2004.

It is sometimes called the "Type 22".

== Development ==
In the 1980s, Chinese naval strategy shifted from coastal to offshore operations ("near-seas active defense"). By the late-1990s, the PLAN wanted fast attack craft with greater range and seakeeping. The Type 022 was likely a response to the requirement. In the early-2000s, China made an abortive attempt to purchase Tarantul-class corvettes from Russia.

The Type 022 is based on AMD Marine Consulting's AMD 350 catamaran hull and developed further by Seabus International in Guangzhou; Seabus was a joint venture between AMD and China State Shipbuilding Corporation's Guangzhou Marine Engineering Corporation.

The prototype launched from Qiuxin Shipyard in Shanghai in April 2004. Production occurred from at least six shipyards before ending in 2009.

In October 2025, Janes reported that Indonesia planned to acquire the Type 022.

== Design ==
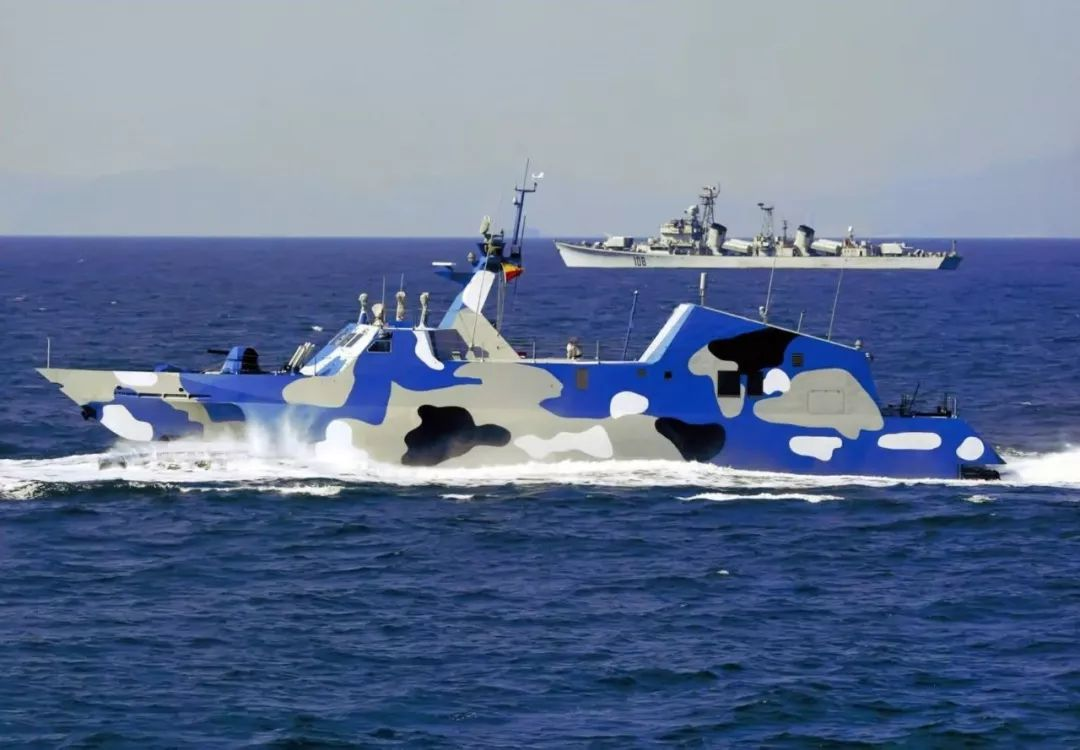
Type 022s in disruptive camouflage.

The Type 022 has a wave-piercing catamaran hull made of aluminium. The hull is reportedly manufactured using friction stir welding. Radar cross section-reduction features are incorporated, including a stealthy turret for the AK-630.

The boat only has line of sight sensors. Longer-range fire in coordination with other units is enabled by tactical data links.

According to a 2014 report from the U.S. Naval War College's China Maritime Studies Institute, the boat's speed and aluminium hull makes it difficult to attack with torpedoes with magnetic detonators.

Later boats received a FLS-1 launcher on bridge for QW man-portable surface-to-air missile.

== Operational history ==
Type 022s in the PLAN typically deploy in squadrons of eight. During exercises, they have fired coordinated missile salvoes using third-party targeting data. Their missions may include coastal defense, ISR, and supporting offensive operations outside territorial waters.

In December 2025 it was reported that two Type 022s were modified by replacing their missile bins with a larger box-like structure.

== See also ==
- Hamina-class missile boat
- Kuang Hua VI-class missile boat
- Skjold-class corvette

== Sources ==
- International Institute for Strategic Studies (2025). The Military Balance 2025. London: Routledge. ISBN 978-1-041-04967-8.
- Murray, William S. (2014). "Underwater TELs and China's Antisubmarine Warfare". China's Near Seas Combat Capabilities. CMSI Red Book. Vol. 11. China Maritime Studies Institute. ISBN 978-1-935352-16-7.
- Patch, John (2014). "Chinese Houbei Fast Attack Craft". China's Near Seas Combat Capabilities. CMSI Red Book. Vol. 11. China Maritime Studies Institute. ISBN 978-1-935352-16-7.
- Walton, Timothy A.; McGrath, Bryan (2014). "China's Surface Fleet Trajectory". China's Near Seas Combat Capabilities. CMSI Red Book. Vol. 11. China Maritime Studies Institute. ISBN 978-1-935352-16-7.
- Saunders, Stephan, ed. (2015). Jane's Fighting Ships 2015-2016. Jane's Information Group. ISBN 978-0710631435.
