= List of current ships of the Islamic Republic of Iran Navy =

This is a list of the ships of the Iran Navy, the country's main navy. Former ships of the Iran Navy can be found here. It does not include vessels of the Islamic Revolutionary Guard Corps Navy. The prefix "IRIS" is short for "Islamic Republic of Iran Ship".

== Submarines ==
Class	Picture	Name	Origin	Displacement	Notes
Attack submarines (2 non-operational)
Kilo class		IRIS Nooh	USSR	~2,325 tons	Taregh (RUS Paltus (Project 877EKM (Kilo))) (2 more non-operational) with 6 single 533mm TT. One unit, the IRIS Taregh, confirmed sunk by US forces, 13 March 2026
Kilo class		IRIS Yunes	USSR	~2,325 tons	Taregh (RUS Paltus (Project 877EKM (Kilo))) (2 more non-operational) with 6 single 533mm TT. One unit, the IRIS Taregh, confirmed sunk by US forces, 13 March 2026
Midget submarines (5+)
Ghadir class		~5+	Iran	~125 tons	Ghadir (DPRK Yeono mod) with 2 single 533mm TT with Jask-2 (C-704 (Nasr)) AShM/Valfajr HWT (additional vessels in build). According to the latest US statements, 11 Iranian midget submarines have been destroyed by US (and possibly joint US-Israeli) actions in this conflict.

== Patrol and coastal combatants ==
Class	Picture	Name	Origin	Displacement	Notes
Fast attack craft (11)
Kaman class		IRIS Kaman	France	234 tons	up to 10 Kaman (FRA Combattante with 1 twin lnchr with C-802 AShM, 1 76mm gun.
Kaman class		IRIS Xoubin	France	234 tons	up to 10 Kaman (FRA Combattante with 1 twin lnchr with C-802 AShM, 1 76mm gun.
Kaman class		IRIS Khadang	France	234 tons	up to 10 Kaman (FRA Combattante with 1 twin lnchr with C-802 AShM, 1 76mm gun.
Kaman class		IRIS Falakhon	France	234 tons	up to 10 Kaman (FRA Combattante with 1 twin lnchr with C-802 AShM, 1 76mm gun.
Kaman class		IRIS Shamshir	France	234 tons	up to 10 Kaman (FRA Combattante with 1 twin lnchr with C-802 AShM, 1 76mm gun.
Kaman class		IRIS Gorz	France	234 tons	up to 10 Kaman (FRA Combattante with 1 twin lnchr with C-802 AShM, 1 76mm gun.
Kaman class		IRIS Gardouneh	France	234 tons	up to 10 Kaman (FRA Combattante with 1 twin lnchr with C-802 AShM, 1 76mm gun.
Kaman class		IRIS Khanjar	France	234 tons	up to 10 Kaman (FRA Combattante with 1 twin lnchr with C-802 AShM, 1 76mm gun.
Kaman class		IRIS Neyzeh	France	234 tons	up to 10 Kaman (FRA Combattante with 1 twin lnchr with C-802 AShM, 1 76mm gun.
Kaman class		IRIS Tabarzin	France	234 tons	up to 10 Kaman (FRA Combattante with 1 twin lnchr with C-802 AShM, 1 76mm gun.
Sina class		IRIS Zereh	Iran	275 tons	With 1 twin lnchr with C-802, 1 76mm gun.
Patrol craft (9)
Hendijan class		IRIS Sirik	Netherlands	~420 tons	3 Hendijan with 2 twin lnchr with C-802 (Noor) (CH-SS-N-6) AShM.
Hendijan class		IRIS Kalat	Netherlands	~420 tons	3 Hendijan with 2 twin lnchr with C-802 (Noor) (CH-SS-N-6) AShM.
Hendijan class		IRIS Konarak	Netherlands	~420 tons	3 Hendijan with 2 twin lnchr with C-802 (Noor) (CH-SS-N-6) AShM.
Kaivan class		IRIS Kaivan	United States	85 tons	3 Kayvan with 2 single lnchr with C-704 (Nasr) AShM.
Kaivan class		IRIS Tiran	United States	85 tons	3 Kayvan with 2 single lnchr with C-704 (Nasr) AShM.
Kaivan class		IRIS Mahan	United States	85 tons	3 Kayvan with 2 single lnchr with C-704 (Nasr) AShM.
Parvin class		IRIS Parvin	United States	105 tons	3 Parvin with 2 single lnchr with C-704 (Nasr) AShM.
Parvin class		IRIS Bahram	United States	105 tons	3 Parvin with 2 single lnchr with C-704 (Nasr) AShM.
Parvin class		IRIS Nahid	United States	105 tons	3 Parvin with 2 single lnchr with C-704 (Nasr) AShM.
PBFT
Kajami class		n/a	Iran	~30 tons	3 Kajami (semi-submersible) with 2 324mm TT.
Kajami class		n/a	Iran	~30 tons	3 Kajami (semi-submersible) with 2 324mm TT.
Kajami class		n/a	Iran	~30 tons	3 Kajami (semi-submersible) with 2 324mm TT.
PBF
MIL 55 class		n/a	Iran	~15 tons	1 MIL55.
PB
C14 class		n/a	Iran	~20 tons	9 C14.
C14 class		n/a	Iran	~20 tons	9 C14.
C14 class		n/a	Iran	~20 tons	9 C14.
C14 class		n/a	Iran	~20 tons	9 C14.
C14 class		n/a	Iran	~20 tons	9 C14.
C14 class		n/a	Iran	~20 tons	9 C14.
C14 class		n/a	Iran	~20 tons	9 C14.
C14 class		n/a	Iran	~20 tons	9 C14.
C14 class		n/a	Iran	~20 tons	9 C14.
Hendijan class		n/a	Iran	420 tons	8 Hendijan.
Hendijan class		n/a	Iran	420 tons	8 Hendijan.
Hendijan class		n/a	Iran	420 tons	8 Hendijan.
Hendijan class		n/a	Iran	420 tons	8 Hendijan.
Hendijan class		n/a	Iran	420 tons	8 Hendijan.
Hendijan class		n/a	Iran	420 tons	8 Hendijan.
Hendijan class		n/a	Iran	420 tons	8 Hendijan.
Hendijan class		n/a	Iran	420 tons	8 Hendijan.
Mk II class		n/a	n/a	n/a	
Mk II class		n/a	n/a	n/a	
Mk II class		n/a	n/a	n/a	
Mk II class		n/a	n/a	n/a	
Mk II class		n/a	n/a	n/a	
Mk II class		n/a	n/a	n/a	
Mk III class		n/a	n/a	n/a	
Mk III class		n/a	n/a	n/a	
Mk III class		n/a	n/a	n/a	
Mk III class		n/a	n/a	n/a	
Mk III class		n/a	n/a	n/a	
Mk III class		n/a	n/a	n/a	
Mk III class		n/a	n/a	n/a	
Mk III class		n/a	n/a	n/a	
Mk III class		n/a	n/a	n/a	
Mk III class		n/a	n/a	n/a	

== Mine warfare ==
Class	Picture	Name	Origin	Displacement	Notes
MCC
Shahin class		IRIS Shahin	Iran	n/a	

== Surface ships ==
Class	Picture	Ships	Origin	No.	Commissioned	Displacement	Fleet	Notes
Amphibious ships (24)
Hengam class		IRIS Hengam	United Kingdom	511	1974	2,581 tons full-load	Southern Fleet	Unclear if operational
Hengam class		IRIS Larak	United Kingdom	512	1974	2,581 tons full-load	Southern Fleet	Undergoing refit as of 2025
Hengam class		IRIS Tonb	United Kingdom	513	1985	2,581 tons full-load	Southern Fleet	
Hengam class		IRIS Lavan	United Kingdom	514	1985	2,581 tons full-load	Southern Fleet	Interned at Kochi Port, India since 4 March 2026.
Karbala class	One unit sunk by US forces in March 2026	IRIS Fouque	Iran	101	1998	280 tons full-load	Southern Fleet	
Karbala class	One unit sunk by US forces in March 2026	IRIS Qeshm	Iran	504	1995	280 tons full-load	Southern Fleet	
Karbala class	One unit sunk by US forces in March 2026	IRIS Hormoz	Iran	505	1995	280 tons full-load	Southern Fleet	
Karbala class	One unit sunk by US forces in March 2026	IRIS Farour	Iran	506		280 tons full-load	Southern Fleet	
Karbala class	One unit sunk by US forces in March 2026	—	Iran	507		280 tons full-load	Southern Fleet	
Karbala class	One unit sunk by US forces in March 2026	—	Iran	508		280 tons full-load	Southern Fleet	
SR.N6		—	United Kingdom	01	1973	10 tons full-load	Southern Fleet	
SR.N6		—	United Kingdom	02	1973	10 tons full-load	Southern Fleet	
SR.N6		—	United Kingdom	03	1973	10 tons full-load	Southern Fleet	
SR.N6		—	United Kingdom	04	1974	10 tons full-load	Southern Fleet	
SR.N6		—	United Kingdom	05	1974	10 tons full-load	Southern Fleet	
SR.N6		—	United Kingdom	06	1975	10 tons full-load	Southern Fleet	
SR.N6		—	United Kingdom	07	1975	10 tons full-load	Southern Fleet	
SR.N6		—	United Kingdom	08	1975	10 tons full-load	Southern Fleet	
BH.7		—	United Kingdom	101	1970	55 tons full-load	Southern Fleet	
BH.7		—	United Kingdom	102	1971	55 tons full-load	Southern Fleet	
BH.7		—	United Kingdom	103	1974	55 tons full-load	Southern Fleet	
BH.7		—	United Kingdom	104	1974	55 tons full-load	Southern Fleet	
BH.7		—	United Kingdom	105	1974	55 tons full-load	Southern Fleet	
BH.7		—	United Kingdom	106	1975	55 tons full-load	Southern Fleet	
Auxiliary ships (13)
Kangan class		IRIS Kangan	India	411	1978	12,193 tons full-load	Southern Fleet	
Kangan class		IRIS Taheri	India	412	1979	12,193 tons full-load	Southern Fleet	
Kangan class		IRIS Shahid Marjni	India	?	1991	12,193 tons full-load	Southern Fleet	
Kangan class		IRIS Amir	India	?	1992	12,193 tons full-load	Southern Fleet	
Bandar Abbas class		IRIS Bandar Abbas	West Germany	421	1974	4,748 tons full-load	Southern Fleet	Undergoing overhaul as of 2025
Bandar Abbas class		IRIS Bushehr	West Germany	422	1974	4,748 tons full-load	Southern Fleet	Interned in Sri Lanka in 2026.
Delvar class		IRIS Deylam	Pakistan	424	1980–1982	1,300 tonnes	Southern Fleet	
Delvar class		IRIS Delvar	Pakistan	471	1980–1982	1,300 tonnes	Southern Fleet	
Delvar class		IRIS Sirjan	Pakistan	472	1980–1982	1,300 tonnes	Southern Fleet	
Delvar class		IRIS Charak	Pakistan	481	1980–1982	1,300 tonnes	Southern Fleet	
Delvar class		IRIS Chiroo	Pakistan	482	1980–1982	1,300 tonnes	Southern Fleet	
Delvar class		IRIS Souru	Pakistan	483	1980–1982	1,300 tonnes	Southern Fleet	
Delvar class		IRIS Dayer	Pakistan	?	1980–1982	1,300 tonnes	Southern Fleet	

== See also ==
- List of equipment of the Navy of the Islamic Revolutionary Guard Corps
- List of former Iranian naval vessels
- List of Iran Navy ships and submarines under construction
