= IRIS Yunes =

Iranian submarine

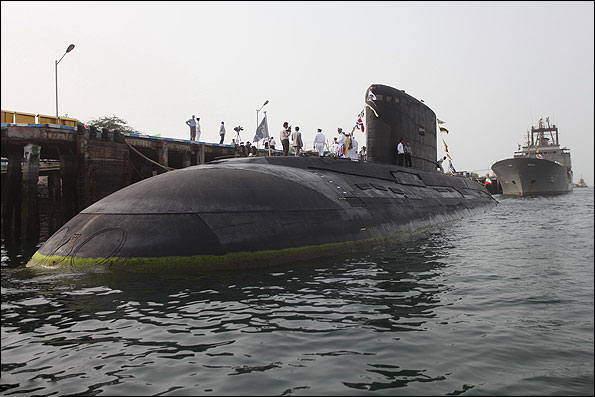
- Younes in July 2011

History

Iran
- Name: Younes
- Namesake: Jonah
- Operator: Islamic Republic of Iran Navy
- Builder: Admiralty Shipyard
- Laid down: 1990
- Launched: 12 July 1994
- Commissioned: 25 November 1996
- Home port: Bandar Abbas
- Identification: 903
- Status: In active service

General characteristics
- Class & type: Kilo-class submarine
- Displacement: 2,356 tons surfaced, 3,076 tons submerged
- Length: 72.6 m (238 ft 2 in)
- Beam: 9.9 m (32 ft 6 in)
- Draft: 6.6 m (21 ft 8 in)
- Installed power: Diesel-electric
- Propulsion: 2 × 3,650 horsepower (2.72 MW) Generators; 1 × 5,500 horsepower (4.1 MW) Propulsion motor; 1 × 130 horsepower (97 kW) Economic speed motor; 2 × 204 horsepower (152 kW) Auxiliary propulsion motor; 1 × Shaft; 2 × Diesels
- Speed: Surfaced; 10 knots (19 km/h); Snorkel mode; 9 knots (17 km/h); Submerged; 17 knots (31 km/h)
- Range: Snorkel mode; 6,000 mi (9,700 km) at 7 kn (13 km/h); Submerged; 400 mi (640 km) at 3 kn (5.6 km/h)
- Test depth: Normally 240 m (790 ft)
- Complement: 53 (12 officers)
- Armament: 18 torpedoes; 24 mines in lieu of torpedo tube

IRIS Younes or Yunes (Persian: زیردریایی یونس) is the third Kilo-class attack submarine of Islamic Republic of Iran Navy serving in the Southern Fleet. The submarine is part of the 28th Flotilla.

== Construction and commissioning ==
Iran and Russia signed a contract for submarines in 1988. It was reportedly worth $750 million for two submarines (Taregh and Nooh), with an option for the third (Younes).

Her keel was laid down at Admiralty Shipyard in Saint Petersburg in 1990. She was launched in 1993 and was commissioned on 25 November 1996. Jane's Defence Weekly reported on 8 October 1994 that Iran was considering cancellation of Younes, due what was later revealed to be continued problems with batteries of the first two received submarines of the same class.

The submarine is named after Jonah.

== Service history ==
According to Jane's, Younes did not appear in Indian Naval Review in February 2001, probably because of a mechanical problem.

In July 2011, Younes returned from its first mission in high seas, ending a 66-day deployment since April in the Gulf of Aden and the Red Sea. An Iranian naval official said the submarine tested upgraded systems during the mission, identifying and intercepting surface vessels and subsurface float of different countries within area. It also accompanied 14th Flotilla fighting Piracy off the coast of Somalia in July.

On 20 November 2013, Younes left home on a mission to East Asia. Welcomed by local officials, it docked at Mumbai, India on 5 December. The submarine arrived at Colombo, Sri Lanka on 22 December and was visited by Admiral Jayanath Colombage before it left the port.

== See also ==
- List of current ships of the Islamic Republic of Iran Navy
