= List of ship commissionings in 1981 =

The list of ship commissionings in 1981 includes a chronological list of all ships commissioned in 1981.

	Operator	Ship	Flag	Class and type	Pennant	Other notes
10 January	United States Navy	Estocin		Oliver Hazard Perry-class frigate	FFG-15	
7 March	Coiste an Asgard	Asgard II		Sail training brigantine		
21 March	Royal Australian Navy	Canberra		Adelaide-class frigate	FFG 02	
21 March	United States Navy	Clifton Sprague		Oliver Hazard Perry-class frigate	FFG-16	
27 March	United States Navy	Kidd		Kidd-class destroyer	DDG-993	
28 March	United States Navy	Bremerton		Los Angeles-class submarine	SSN-698	
14 April	Royal Netherlands Navy	Piet Hein		Kortenaer-class frigate	F811	
16 May	United States Navy	Jacksonville		Los Angeles-class submarine	SSN-699	
20 June	United States Navy	Flatley		Oliver Hazard Perry-class frigate	FFG-21	
1 August	Islamic Republic of Iran Navy	Khanjar		Kaman-class fast attack craft	P230	
1 August	Islamic Republic of Iran Navy	Neyzeh		Kaman-class fast attack craft	P231	
1 August	Islamic Republic of Iran Navy	Tabarzin		Kaman-class fast attack craft	P232	
29 August	United States Navy	Callaghan		Kidd-class destroyer	DDG-994	
19 September	United States Navy	Jack Williams		Oliver Hazard Perry-class frigate	FFG-24	
26 September	United States Navy	Antrim		Oliver Hazard Perry-class frigate	FFG-20	
10 October	Hellenic Navy	Elli		Elli-class frigate	F450	First in class
10 October	United States Navy	Taurus		Pegasus-class hydrofoil	PHM-3	
24 October	United States Navy	Scott		Kidd-class destroyer	DDG-995	
14 November	United States Navy	John A. Moore		Oliver Hazard Perry-class frigate	FFG-19	
14 November	United States Navy	Florida		Ohio-class submarine	SSGN-728	
2 December	Royal Netherlands Navy	Philips van Almonde		Kortenaer-class frigate	F823	
5 December	United States Navy	Gallery		Oliver Hazard Perry-class frigate	FFG-26	
29 December	Soviet Navy	TK-208		Typhoon-class submarine	TK-208	
