= IRIS Shahin =

Iranian minesweeper

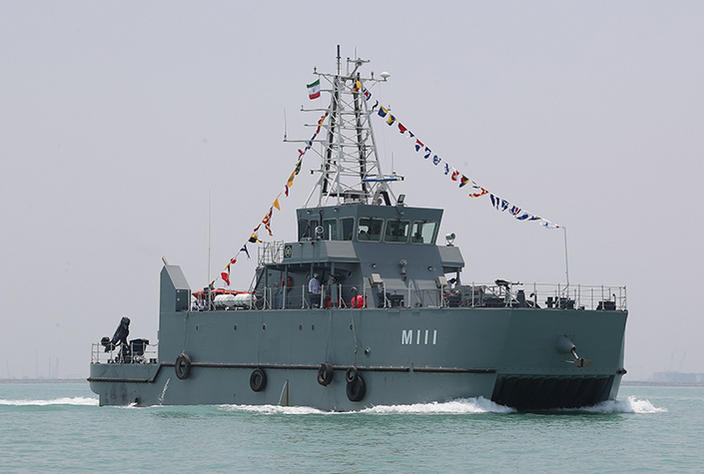
- Minesweeper Shahin

History

Iran
- Name: Shahin
- Operator: Islamic Republic of Iran Navy
- Ordered: 2013
- Builder: Iranian Navy's Factories, Bandar Abbas
- Launched: 14 June 2021

General characteristics
- Type: Minesweeper
- Length: 33 m (108 ft 3 in)
- Beam: 11 m (36 ft 1 in)
- Draught: 180 cm (5 ft 11 in)

IRIS Shahin is a minesweeper constructed under the guidance of the Iranian Navy and young professionals from the Ministry of Defense and Armed Forces Support. The Shahin was officially commissioned into the Navy of the Islamic Republic of Iran during a ceremony held on June 14, 2021. Shahin measures 33 meters (108 ft 3 in) in length, 11 m (36 ft 1 in) in width, and has a draft of 180 centimeters (5 ft 11 in). The vessel possesses the capability to detect and neutralize different types of sea mines. The objective of the vessel Shahin is to locate, identify, and eliminate different categories of sea mines, such as those resting on the seabed, submerged, and floating. This is achieved through the use of composite technology and a surface effect design featuring dual hulls (catamarans). The mission commenced in 2013 and has progressed to an operational phase, having completed over four implementation activities. The mission has successfully installed and commissioned more than 60 systems related to mechanics, facilities, mobility, and propulsion, electrical and electronic components, as well as navigation.

The implementation of composite technology through sandwich panels in the design and construction of the vessel's hull aims to minimize weight while enhancing strength. Additionally, the application of surface-effect vessel technology, which generates air cushions at the stern and heel of the ship, is intended to lower the draft level. This significantly decreases the hull's pressure on the water and its susceptibility to naval mines. Furthermore, the Shahin incorporates notable indigenous technologies, including DP1, which is the first locally developed system for stabilizing the vessel's position at sea. It also features a high-precision mine-finding sonar system to enhance detection capabilities, and includes the design and construction of the first indigenous floating lifting system, known as hovering, which is used for mine-handling operations.

== See also ==
- IRIS Dena
- List of current ships of the Islamic Republic of Iran Navy
- List of equipment of the Islamic Revolutionary Guard Corps Navy
- List of Iran Navy ships and submarines under construction
- List of Iranian naval equipment
