= List of Iranian naval equipment =

This is an index of equipment used by naval forces of Iran:

- List of equipment of the Navy of the Islamic Revolutionary Guard Corps
- List of current ships of the Islamic Republic of Iran Navy

lists above mention currently commissioned vessels.

- List of former Iranian naval vessels
  - List of Imperial Iranian Navy vessels active in 1979
- Afsharid navy § Equipment

lists above mentions historical naval ships.

- List of naval ship classes of Iran

list above mentions previous, current and future ship classes
