= Iranian vessel Susa =

History

Iran
- Name: Susa
- Namesake: Susa
- Builder: AG Weser
- Yard number: 76
- Launched: 1884
- Commissioned: 1885
- Home port: Khorramshahr

General characteristics
- Length: 24.0 m (78 ft 9 in)
- Beam: 4.5 m (14 ft 9 in)
- Installed power: Steam
- Propulsion: 30 horsepower

Susa (Persian: شوش) was a steamer patrol boat owned by Persia. She was bought in 1884 from Germany along with Persepolis, together with whom formed the only two equipment in the navy as of 1904.

== Construction and commissioning ==
Susa was built by German AG Weser at Bremen, on orders from Persian government. The shipbuilder assigned production number 76 to the vessel and launched it in 1884. She was acquired by Persia in 1885, having been delivered by German crew to her home in Khorramshahr.

== See also ==
- Historical Iranian Navy vessels
