= PC12 =

PC12 may refer to:

- PC12 cell line, in biotechnology
- PC12 minicomputer
- Pilatus PC-12, a civilian aircraft
- USS Thunderbolt (PC-12), a patrol vessel of the United States Navy
- BAP Río Chira (PC 12), a vessel of the Peruvian Coast Guard
