= PGM-39-class gunboat =

United States class of gunboat

- PGM-63 on 9 May 1963 trials - J. M. Martinac Shipbuilding Corp

Class overview
- Builders: Marinette Marine Corp., Marinette, WI; J.M. Martinac Shipbuilding Corp., Tacoma, WA; Peterson Builders, Sturgeon Bay, WI; Tacoma Boat Building Co., Tacoma, WA
- Preceded by: PGM-9 class
- Succeeded by: Asheville class
- Built: 1959-1970
- Completed: 59

General characteristics
- Type: Motor gunboat
- Displacement: 118 tons
- Length: 101 ft (31 m)
- Beam: 21 ft (6.4 m)
- Draft: 6.8–9 ft (2.1–2.7 m)
- Propulsion: 2 × Mercedes Benz 12V493 TY57 2,200 hp (1,600 kW) diesel engines; 2 × shafts
- Speed: 17 knots (31 km/h; 20 mph)
- Complement: 17
- Armament: 1 × 40 mm gun; 2 × 20 mm guns; 2 × 12.7 mm machine guns; 81 mm mortar (some units)

The PGM-39-class gunboats, designated Patrol Gunboat, Motor (Note: Also rendered as "Patrol Gun Boat Motor") by the United States Navy were a class of fifty nine gunboats constructed in various shipyards from 1959 to 1970. The design was based on the United States Coast Guard Cape-class cutter design with a five-foot (1.5 m) hull extension. It was specifically designed for the U.S. Military Assistance Program and was used by the navies of The Philippines, Indonesia, South Vietnam, Thailand, Burma, Ethiopia, and Ecuador.

The members of this class of gunboats are:
PGM-39 to PGM-46
PGM-51 to PGM-83
PGM-91
PGM-102 to PGM-108
PGM-111 to PGM-117
PGM-122 to PGM-124

The first vessel (PGM-39) of the class was used by the Philippine Navy as BRP Agusan (PG 61). The other Philippine Navy units were PGM-40 as BRP Catanduanes (PG 62), PGM-41 as BRP Romblon (PG 63), PGM-42 as BRP Palawan (PG 64), and PGM-83 as BRP Basilan (PG 60) ex-RVN Hon Troc (HQ 618).

The PGM-39 class has varied weapons mix of 40 mm and 20 mm cannon, 12.7 mm machine guns, and 81mm mortar.

== Status of remaining ships ==
BRP Palawan (PG 64) and BAP Río Chira (PC 12) are still in operation with the Philippine Coast Guard and Peruvian Coast Guard, respectively. Other PGMs are still in service in various capacities. However, the galvanic reaction between the steel hull and aluminum superstructure of the boats in seawater creates maintenance problems which significantly shorten their careers as military vessels.

== Successor ==
The Asheville-class gunboat resulted from modification studies of the PGM-39 class.

== See also ==
- Parvin-class patrol craft

== Sources ==
- NavSource Motor Gunboat (PGM) Index
- Gunboats (PGM, PG, PFMM, PGG, PCG) Built Since WWII
