= List of former Iranian naval vessels =

This is a list of naval ships that were in service with the naval forces of Iran after 1885, and had been either decommissioned or lost since then.

== List of ships ==
=== Cruiser ===
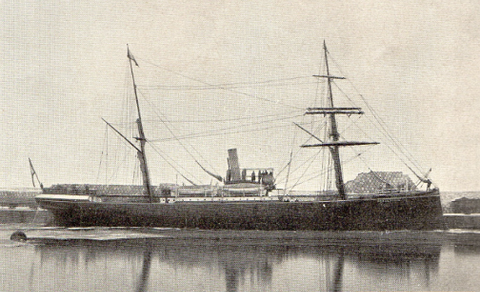
Persepolis

- Persepolis (1885–1925)

=== Destroyer ===
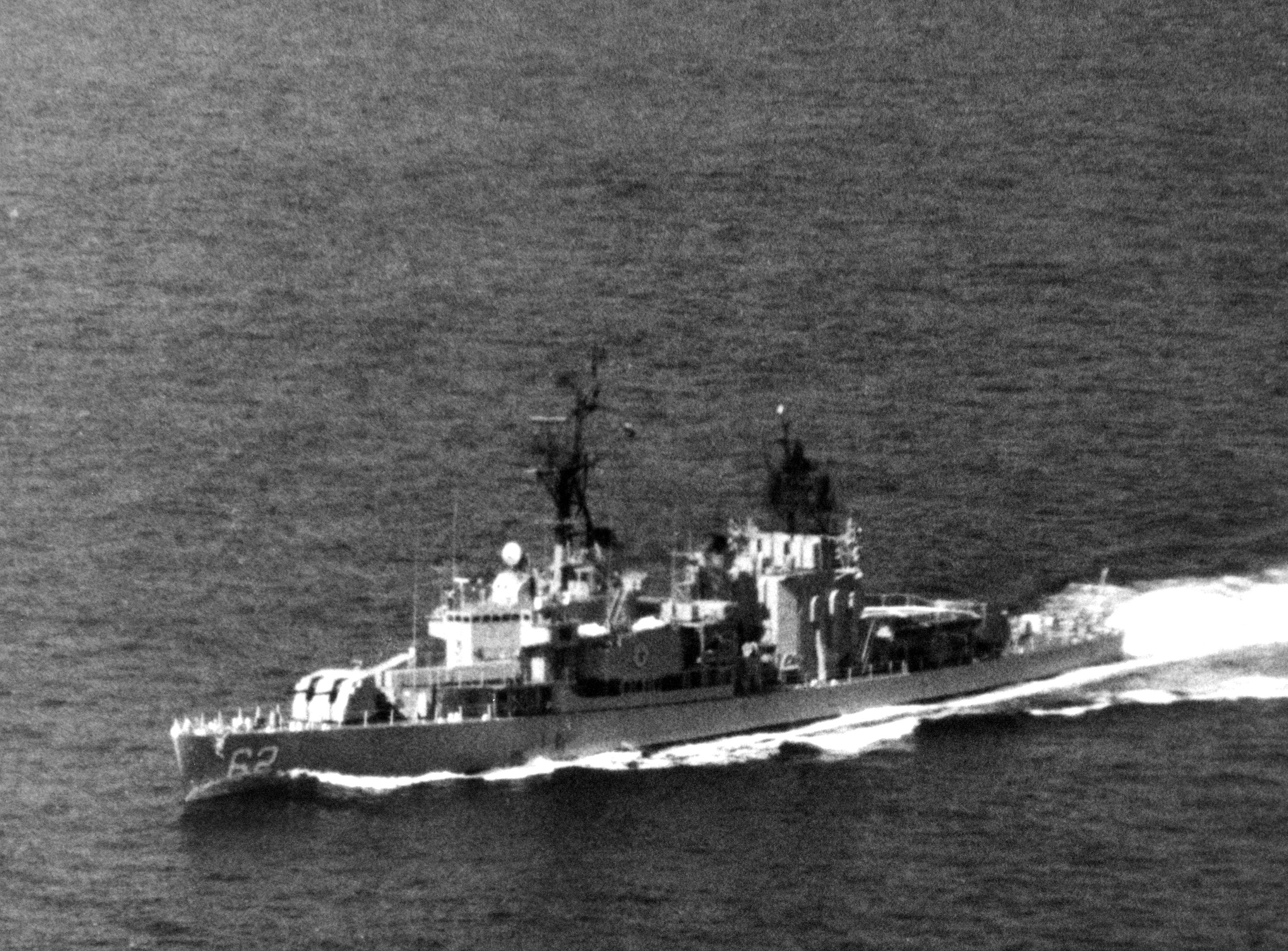
The destroyer Palang

- Damavand (ex-Artemiz) (1966–199?), used to be the British HMS Sluys (D60); it was sold to Iran in 1966 and retired in the early 1990s.
- Babr, used to be the American USS Zellars (DD-777) (1973–1994), it was sold to Iran in 1973 and has been non-operational since 1994.
- Palang, used to be the American USS Stormes (DD-780) (1972–199?), it was sold to Iran in 1972 and retired in the 1990s.

=== Sloop ===
- Babr (1931–1941), Sunk by HMAS Yarra on 25 August 1941 in Khorramshahr.
- Palang (1931–1941), Sunk by HMS Shoreham on 25 August 1941 in Abadan.

=== Frigate ===
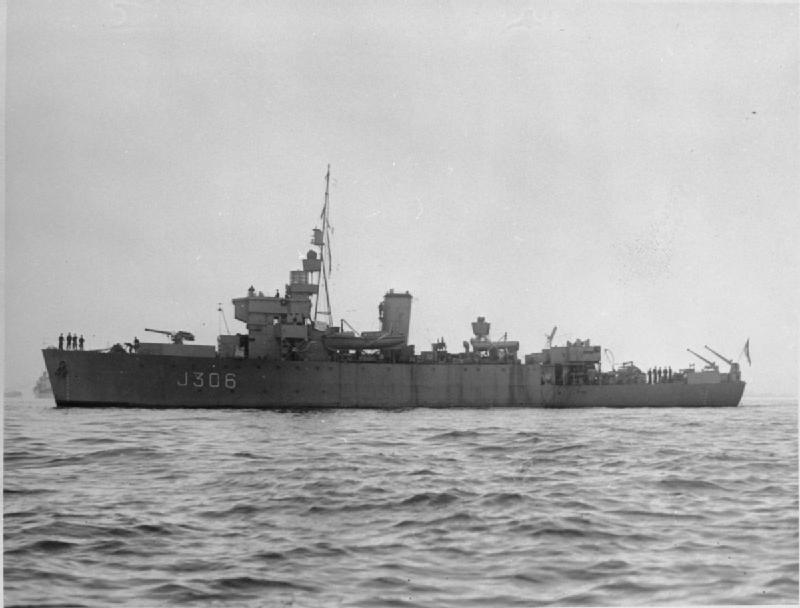
The frigate Palang

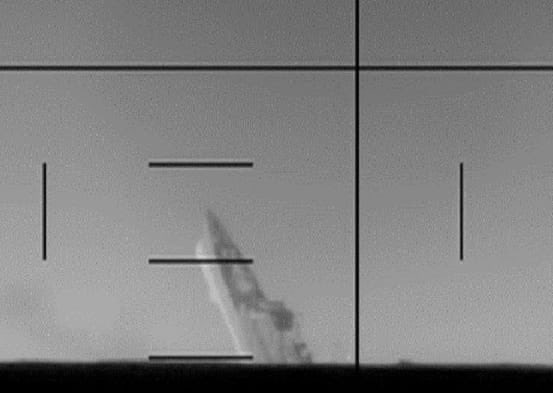
IRIS Dena sinking after a direct MK 48 torpedo hit by a U.S. Navy submarine, Indian Ocean off Sri Lanka, 4 March 2026.

- Sahand (1971–1988): Sunk by U.S. warships and aircraft in 1988 in U.S. Operation Praying Mantis.
- Babr (1949–1969)
- Palang (1949–1966)
- Sahand (2012–2024)
- Dena (2021–2026) Dena was torpedoed by the submarine USS Charlotte with a Mark 48 torpedo and sunk on 4 March 2026 during the 2026 Iran War. At the time, she was in the Indian Ocean off the coast of Sri Lanka.
- Alvand (1971–2026)
- Sabalan (1972–2026)
- Sahand (1972–2026)
- Jamaran (2010–2026)
- Deylayman (2023–2026)

=== Corvette ===
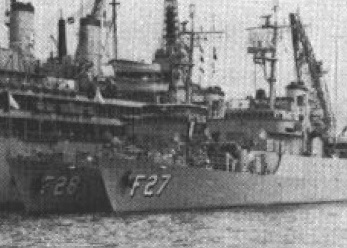
Milanian and Kahnamuie

- Milanian (1969–1982), used to be the American PF-105, In service
- Kahnamuie (1969–1982), used to be the American PF-106, In service
- Naghdi (1964-2026)
- Bayandor (1964-2026)
- Hamzeh (1936-2026)

=== Motor launch ===
- Babolsar (1935–c.1972)
- Gorgan (1935–c.1972)
- Sefidroud (1935–c.1972)
- Azerbaijan (1935–1941)
- Gilan (1935–1941)
- Mazandaran (1935–1941)

=== Patrol craft ===
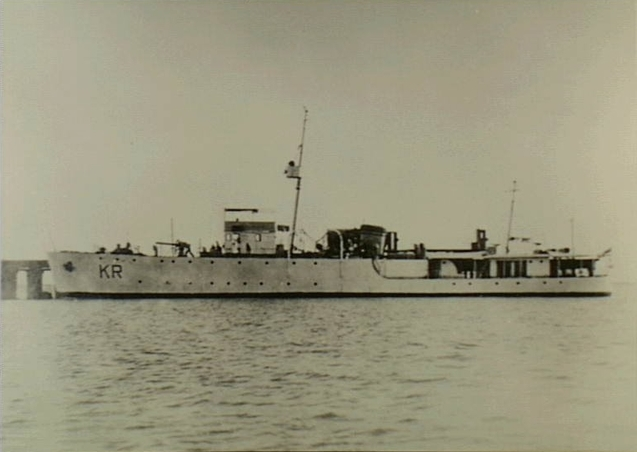
Karkas

- Susa (1885–?)
- Mozaffari (1903–1914; 1918–1936)
- Shahin (1923–1941)
- Chahrogh (1931–1941)
- Simorgh (1931–1941)
- Karkas (1931–1941)
- Chahbaaz (1931–1941)
- Azerbaijan (1905–1918)
- Gilan (1905–1918)
- Khorasan (1905–1918)
- Mazandaran (1905–1918)
- Perebonia (1905–1920)

=== Submarine ===
- Kousseh (1978–1979)
- Fateh (2019-2026)
- Taregh (1992-2026)

=== Minelayer ===
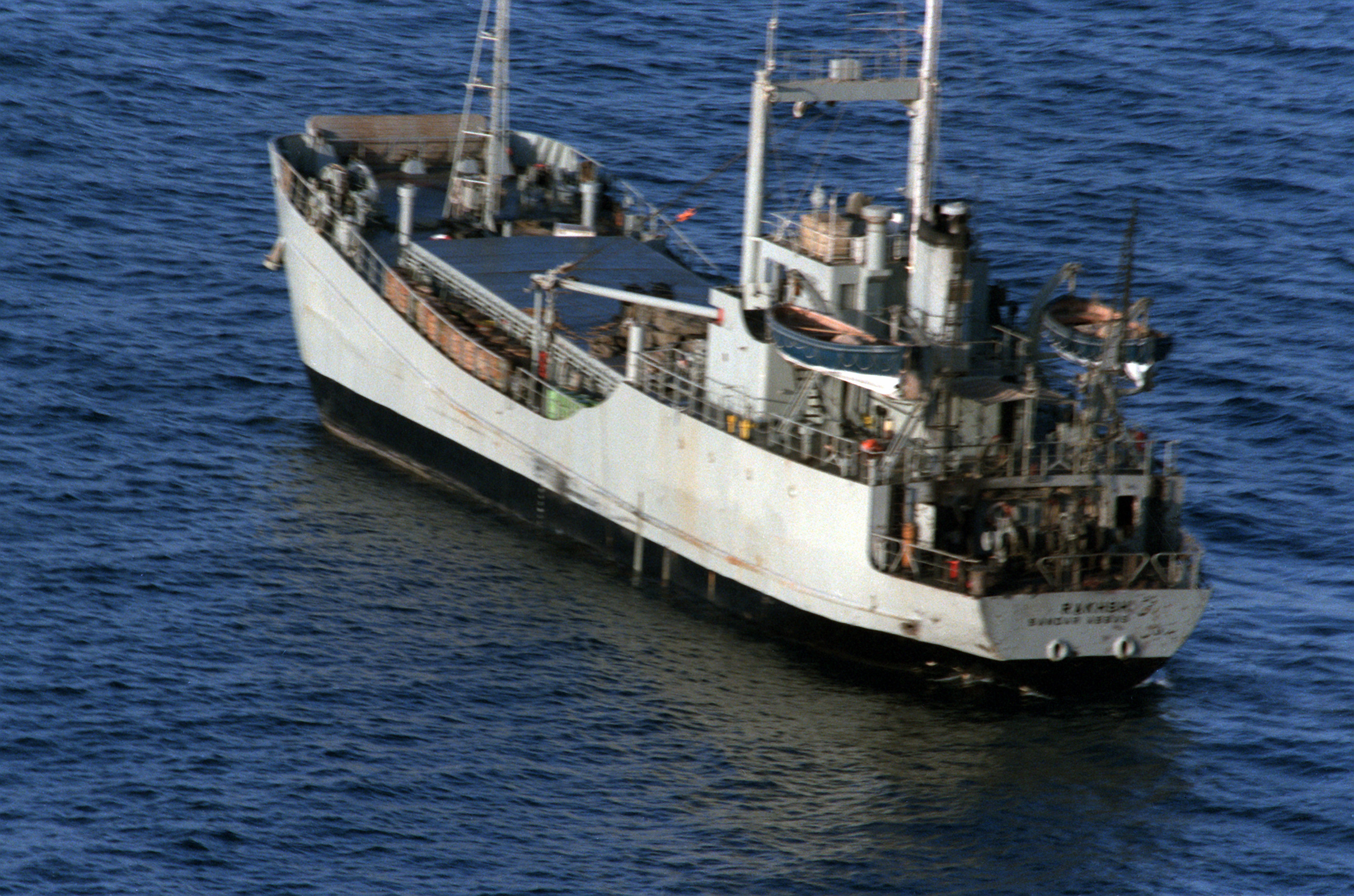
A port quarter view of the captured Iranian minelayer Iran Ajr

- Iran Ajr (1978–1987): Seized and scuttled by U.S. Navy SEALs in the 1987 U.S. Operation Prime Chance.

=== Minesweeper ===
- Shahbaz (1959–1975)
- Shahrokh (c.1959–?)
- Simorgh (1961–1981)
- Karkas (1962–?)
- Harischi (ex-Kahnamuie) (1964–?)
- Riazi (1964–?)

=== Missile boat ===
- Paykan (1978–1980): Sunk in Operation Morvarid on 29 November 1980 by Iraqi forces.
- Joshan (1978–1988): Sunk in Operation Praying Mantis on 18 April 1988 by US forces.
- Mehran (1959–c.1980): Sunk in Iran–Iraq War

=== Landing craft ===
- Qeshm (1964–?)

=== Training ship ===
- Homai (1925–1941)
- Kish (1970–?)

=== Barracks ship ===
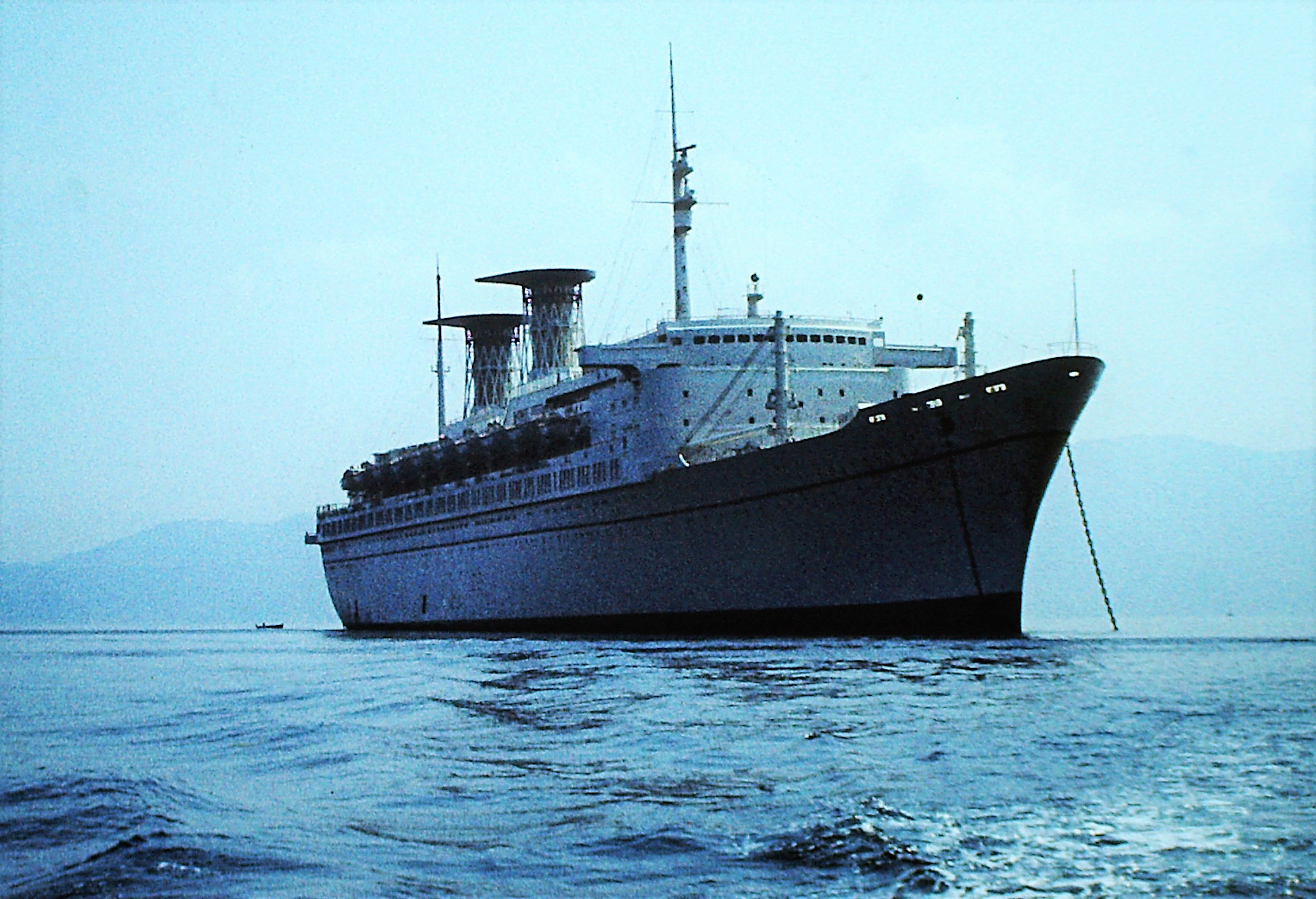
Raffael

- Raffael (1976–1983)
- Michelange (1976–1983)

=== Repair ship ===
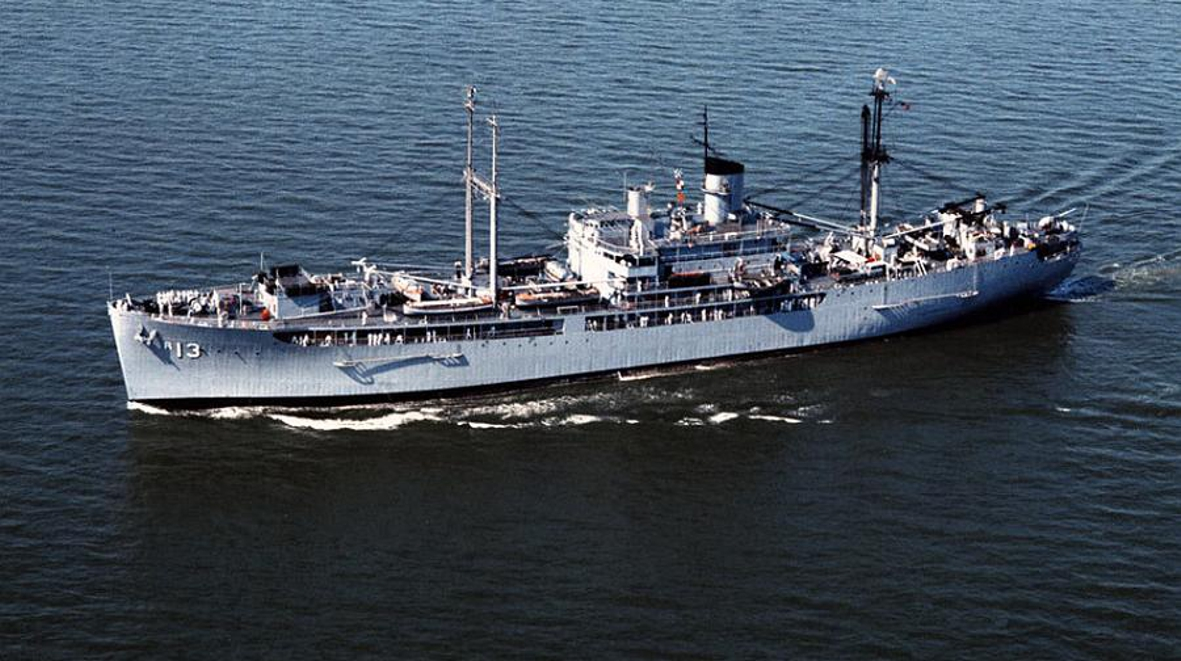
Chabahar

- Sohrab (1961–1974)
- Chabahar (1971–1985)

=== Tug ===
- Nirou
- Yadak Bar

=== Replenishment oiler ===
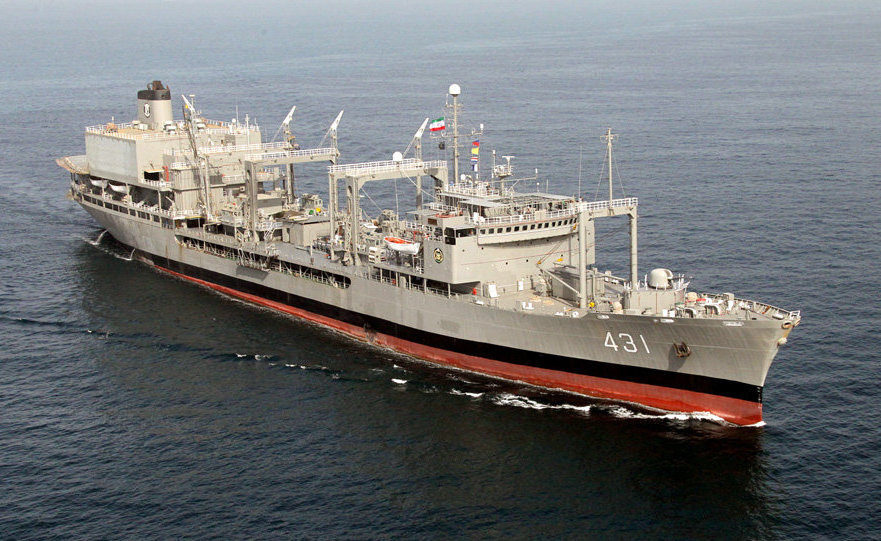
Kharg

- Kharg (1984–2021) : Caught fire and sank on 2 June 2021, near Jask in the Gulf of Oman

=== Harbour tanker ===
- Hormuz
- Lengeh

=== Fast dispatch boat ===
- Tahmadou

=== Tender boat ===
- Sirry

=== Expeditionary Mobile Base ===
- Makran (2021-2026)

== See also ==
- List of naval ship classes of Iran
- List of current ships of the Islamic Republic of Iran Navy
- List of equipment of the Navy of the Islamic Revolutionary Guard Corps
