= BAP Ferré =

BAP Ferré or Ferré may refer to one the following vessels of the Peruvian Navy, named after Diego Ferré, a Peruvian naval officer:

- Frigate BAP Ferré (F-3), 1947–1966, former Royal Canadian Navy River-class frigate HMCS Poundmaker
- Destroyer BAP Ferré (DM-74), 1973–2007, former Royal Navy Daring-class destroyer HMS Decoy (D106)
- Corvette BAP Ferré (PM-211), in service since 2016, former Korean Navy Pohang-class corvette ROKS Gyeongju (PCC-758)
