= IIS Shahin =

Gunboat of the Imperial Iranian Navy

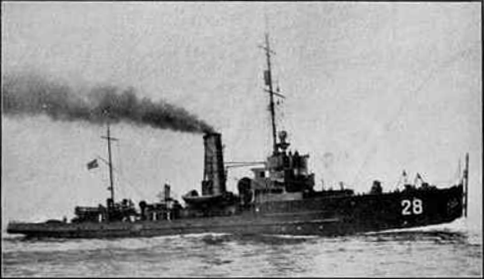
- Photo published by Jane's (1933)

History

Germany
- Name: FM24
- Operator: Imperial German Navy (1917–19); Reichsmarine (1919–22)
- Builder: J. Frerichs & Co, Einswarden
- Laid down: 1917
- Launched: 1918
- Commissioned: 15 March 1919
- Stricken: 29 April 1922
- Fate: Sold

Germany
- Renamed: Fatiya (1923)
- Home port: Hamburg
- Fate: Sold to Iran (1923)

Iran
- Namesake: Pahlavi dynasty; Shaheen falcon
- Operator: Imperial Iranian Navy
- In service: 1923–1941
- Renamed: Pahlavi (1926); Shahin (1935)
- Home port: Khorramshahr
- Fate: Sunk by the British in 1941; Discarded in the early 1940s

General characteristics
- Class & type: FM1-class minesweeper
- Displacement: 135 or 170 tonnes
- Length: 132.5 ft (40.4 m)
- Beam: 19.33 ft (5.89 m)
- Draft: 4.0 ft (1.2 m)
- Installed power: 800 indicated horsepower (0.60 MW)
- Propulsion: 2 × Triple-expansion machinery
- Speed: 16 knots (30 km/h; 18 mph)
- Complement: 44

Shahin (Persian: شاهین), named Pahlavi (Persian: پهلوی) from 1926 to 1935, was an Iranian naval gunboat sunk in the World War II. She was built in Germany as FM24 in 1917 and served in the German navy during World War I as a minesweeper.

== History ==
FM24 was built by German Frerichs & Co. at Einswarden, near Nordenham. A FM1-class minesweeper, she was launched in 1918 and was commissioned by Imperial German Navy on 15 March 1919. FM24 continued to serve in the Reichsmarine until 29 April 1922. She was sold on 7 April to an unknown buyer in Hamburg, who renamed her Fatiya, for M650,000.

When Uzbeks attacked Persian customs and military posts stationed near Farahabad, killing the customs chief and stealing wives and belongings of the men by sea, the Persian government sought to reinforce its forces in the Caspian Sea. A Persian military procurement agent in Germany was ordered to buy a vessel, and in 1923, Fatiya was purchased by Iran for a reported fee of £4,000. The government then armed her with a 48 mm canon and a 37 mm heavy machine gun, and hired a skilled Persian-Armenian marine in the German service to bring her via Volga to Enzeli.

The Soviet Union refused to let Persia pass the vessel through Volga because it was "inconsistent with Soviet interests". The Persians decided to disarm the ship and send it as a civilian ship, while its armaments were diverted and passed via a different route. However, the Russians refused entry again, but offered to provide the Persian government with its vessels to fight contraband. Although the denial of the vessel was not against the Russo-Persian Treaty of Friendship, it was described as "an act of bad faith and ill will".

She was eventually brought to serve in the Persian Gulf. In 1926, she was renamed Pahlavi after the royal name. She was renamed Shahin in 1935 after a bird after being judged unworthy of carrying the Shah's name.

Shahin was reportedly broken up in the early 1940s. Reports indicate that she was sunk by the Royal Navy in Operation Bishop during 1941 British invasion of Iran. American magazine Proceedings wrote that, as of 1944, she was "no longer serviceable, her plates being rusted through and her engines in even worse case".

== See also ==
- List of minor warships of World War II
- List of World War II ships of less than 1000 tons
- List of ships of the Imperial German Navy
- Historical Iranian Navy vessels
