= BAP Río Chira =

Gunboat

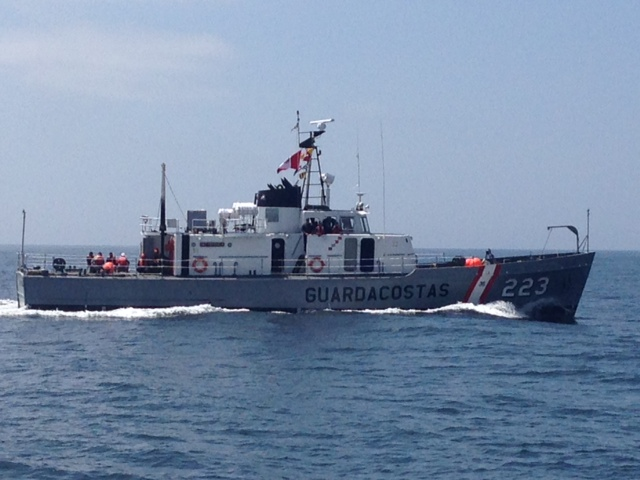
- BAP Rio Chira undergoing navigation tests, December 2013

History

Peru
- Name: BAP Rio Chira
- Builder: SIMA Callao
- Commissioned: 30 June 1972
- Decommissioned: 1994
- Recommissioned: 1997
- Reclassified: PM-223, 1975
- Status: Active as of 2019
- Notes: Transferred to the Peruvian Coast Guard in 1975; Main engines were overhauled before her return to service in 1997

General characteristics
- Class & type: PGM-39-class gunboat
- Displacement: 118 tons
- Length: 101 ft (31 m)
- Beam: 21 ft (6.4 m)
- Draft: 6.8–9 ft (2.1–2.7 m)
- Propulsion: 2 × Mercedes Benz 12V493 TY57 2,200 hp (1,600 kW) diesel engines; 2 × shafts
- Speed: 17 knots (31 km/h; 20 mph)
- Complement: 17
- Armament: 1 × 40 mm gun; 2 × 20 mm guns; 2 × 12.7 mm machine guns

BAP Río Chira (PC 12) is a motor gunboat in the Peruvian Coast Guard. She was built under American influence at SIMA Callao Shipyard and laid down initially as PGM-111. She was transferred to the Peruvian Coast Guard in 1975 and reclassified PM-223.
