= List of Iran Navy ships and submarines under construction =

This is a list of ships and submarines of Iran Navy that are under construction.

== Ships and submarines under construction ==
=== Submarines ===
Class	Picture	Name	Laid Down	Launched	Displacement	Type	Estimated Commission	Fleet	Note
Fateh class	Fateh class submarine	Fateh 2	Unknown	Unknown	527 tons (Surfaced) 593 tons (Submerged)	Coastal submarine	Unknown	Northern Fleet	
Fateh class	Fateh class submarine	Fateh 3	Unknown	Unknown	527 tons (Surfaced) 593 tons (Submerged)	Coastal submarine	Unknown	Southern Fleet	
Fateh class	Fateh class submarine	Fateh 4	Unknown	Unknown	527 tons (Surfaced) 593 tons (Submerged)	Coastal submarine	Unknown	Southern Fleet	
Ghadir class	Ghadir class submarine	(Multiple ships)	Unknown	Unknown	117 tons (Surfaced) 125 tons (Submerged)	Midget submarine	Unknown	Southern Fleet	
Besat class submarine		IRIS Besat	Unknown	Unknown	1,300 t (1,400 tons)	Attack Submarine	Unknown	Unknown	

=== Forward Base Ships ===
Class	Name	Laid Down	Launched	Displacement	Builder	Estimated Commission	Fleet	Notes
Makran-class	Khuzestan				ISOICO Shipyard	2024-2025	Southern Fleet	Being converted from oil tanker, Similar design to Makran
Makran-class	Kurdistan				ISOICO Shipyard	2024-2025	Southern Fleet	Being converted from oil tanker, Similar design to Makran

=== Destroyers ===
Class	Picture	Name	Laid Down	Launched	Displacement	Builder	Estimated Commission	Fleet	Notes
Project Loghman	Project Loghman	IRIS Khalij-e Fars	2019-11-30	Unknown	7,500 tons full load	Iranian Navy's Factories	Unknown	Southern Fleet	At least one block has been built as of 2023

=== Frigates ===
Class	Picture	Name	Laid Down	Launched	Displacement	Builder	Estimated Commission	Fleet	Notes
Moudge-class	Moudge class	Taftan	2014	Unknown	1,500 tons full load	ISOICO Shipyard	2025	Southern Fleet	

=== Fast Attack Craft ===
Class	Name	Laid Down	Launched	Displacement	Builder	Estimated Commission	Fleet	Notes
Sina class				275 tons	Shahid Tamjidi, Bandar Anzali		Northern Fleet	
Sina class				275 tons	Iranian Navy's Factories		Southern Fleet	
Sina class				275 tons	Iranian Navy's Factories		Southern Fleet	
Sina class				275 tons	ISOICO Shipyard		Southern Fleet	
Sina class				275 tons	ISOICO Shipyard		Southern Fleet	
Sina class				275 tons	ISOICO Shipyard		Southern Fleet	

== See also ==
- List of current ships of the Islamic Republic of Iran Navy
