= Konarak vessel incident =

Friendly fire maritime incident in Iran

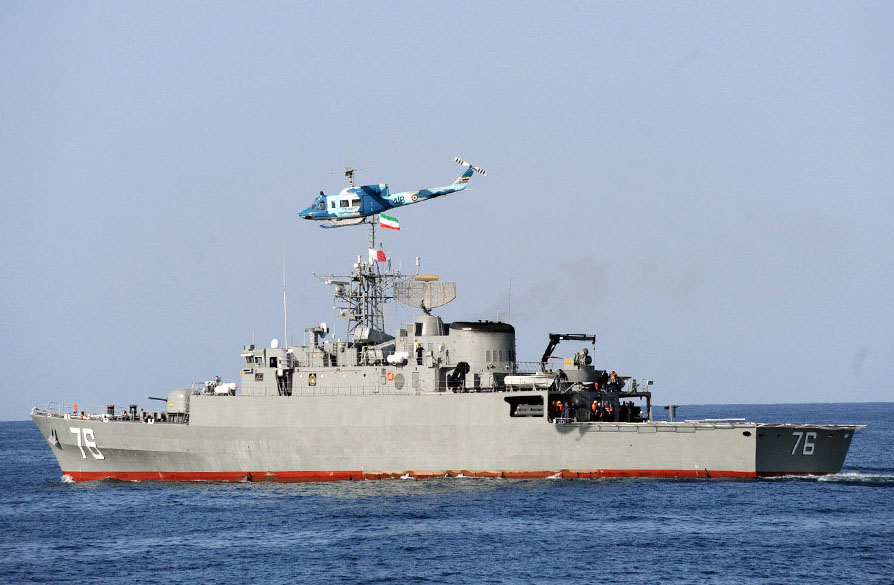
- Iranian frigate Jamaran, involved in the incident
| Date | 10 May 2020 |
| Location | Gulf of Oman |
| Result | 19 Iranian navy personnel killed and 15 others injured; Heavy damage to IRIS Konarak |

The Konarak vessel incident was a friendly fire incident which occurred in the Gulf of Oman on 10 May 2020, during a naval exercise. An anti-ship missile fired from the Iranian frigate Jamaran hit the support vessel Konarak, killing 19 sailors on board the Konarak, and wounding another 15. The Konarak was heavily damaged and its wreckage towed to Chabahar Port. The incident occurred amongst increasing regional tensions, during the 2019–2021 Persian Gulf crisis.

== Incident ==
In May 2020, the Islamic Republic of Iran Navy held naval drills in the Gulf of Oman. The Konarak was struck by a Noor missile, an upgraded YJ-83, which was fired from the Jamaran in the Gulf of Oman close to the Strait of Hormuz. Official Iranian TV initially reported one fatality in the incident, but this was later revised to 19 killed and 15 injured. The Konarak was involved as a tender, setting out targets for target practice for missiles from Jamaran. The Konarak reportedly failed to distance itself sufficiently from the target prior to the launch and was struck by a missile. The missile may have automatically locked onto Konarak as the largest target or else been set as the target by human error. After the incident, Konarak was recovered to port to undergo a "technical inspection". Footage published by Iranian state broadcaster IRIB showed the ship down heavily by the bow with its superstructure devastated and smoke visible from fires.

== Reactions ==
- On 11 May 2020, Mohammad-Ali Abtahi, a former Vice President of Iran, tweeted "Once again there is a lack of transparency in informing the public". He was referring to a similar incident, the downing of Ukraine International Airlines Flight 752, a few months previously.
- On 14 May 2020, the United States Central Command expressed sympathies with Iran over the incident. Spokesman Captain Bill Urban said in a statement, "our sincere condolences to the Iranian people for the tragic loss of life". In further comments, Urban also criticized Iran for setting up military drills so close to the narrow Strait of Hormuz, where one fifth of world oil passes.
- Some experts conclude that with this incident, the stability of the Persian Gulf has come under question. Fabian Hinz of the California-based Middlebury Institute of International Studies, who is an expert on Iran's military, was quoted by The New York Times as saying, "This really showed that the situation with Iran is still dangerous because accidents and miscalculations can happen".
- Referring to two lethal "high-profile" incidents by Iran's military in just a few months, Reed Foster, a senior analyst at Jane's, has said that the incident "damages the credibility" of the Iranian government, under international sanctions, in manipulating sophisticated weapons.
- According to The New York Times, Afshon Ostovar, an Assistant Professor of National Security Affairs at the California Naval Postgraduate School, said the mistake "appears to be beyond sloppy". He went on to say this incident shows the unprofessionalism of the Iranian military.
