= BAP Carvajal =

Peruvian Navy ship

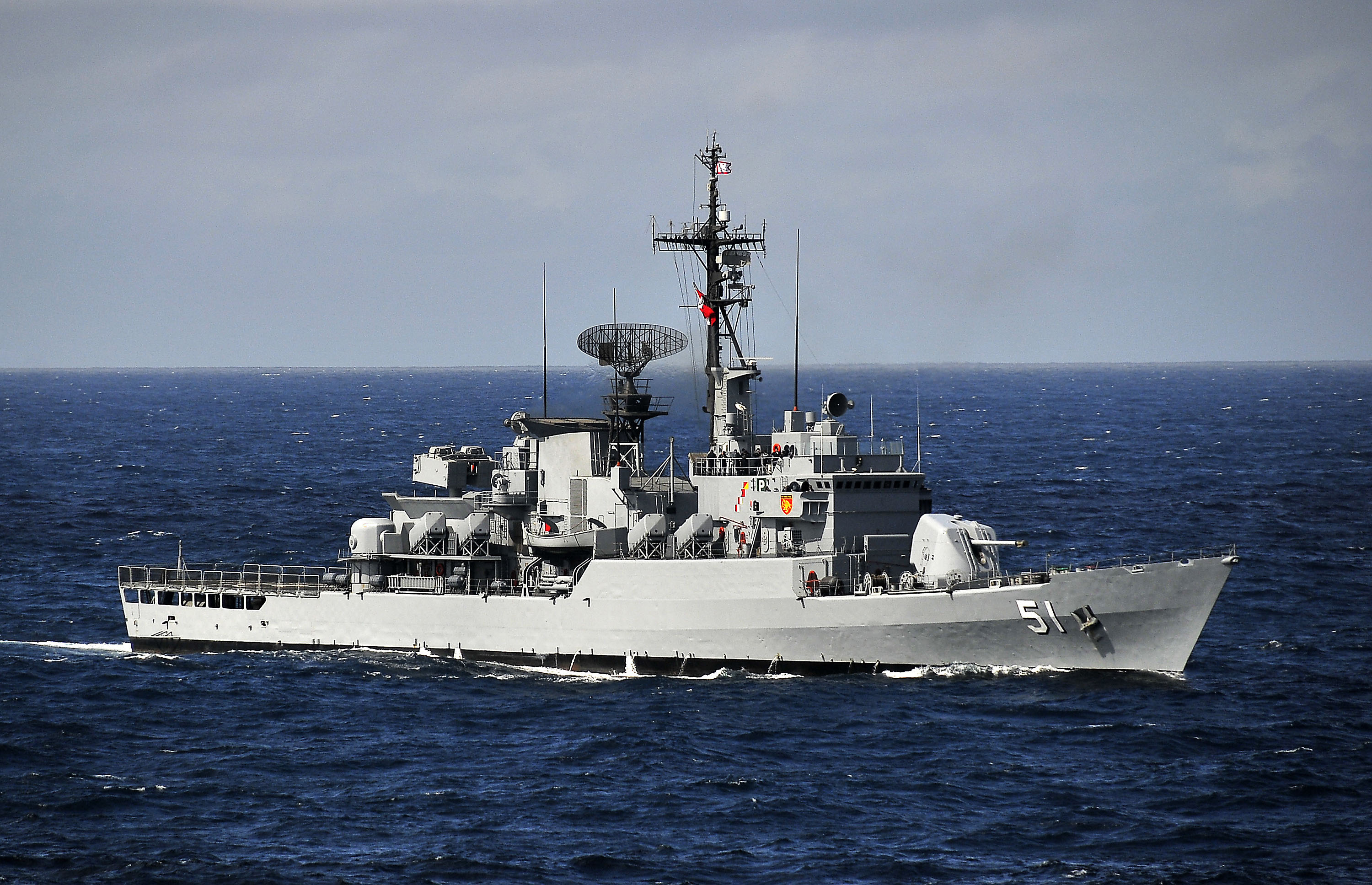
- BAP Carvajal in July 2005

History

Peru
- Name: Carvajal
- Namesake: Melitón Carvajal
- Ordered: 1973
- Builder: Cantieri Navali Riuniti (CNR)
- Laid down: 8 August 1974
- Launched: 17 November 1976
- Commissioned: 23 December 1979
- Decommissioned: 21 september 2022
- Home port: Callao
- Identification: FM-51

Peru
- Name: Guardiamarina San Martin
- Operator: Peruvian Coast Guard
- Recommissioned: 26 December 2013
- Reclassified: Offshore patrol vessel
- Home port: Callao
- Identification: PO-201
- Status: Active in service
- Notes: ITU callsign: OBHH

General characteristics
- Class & type: Carvajal-class frigate
- Displacement: 2,206 tonnes (2,525 tonnes full load)
- Length: 113.2 m (371 ft) overall; 106 m (348 ft) waterline
- Beam: 11.3 m (37 ft)
- Draught: 3.7 m (12 ft)
- Propulsion: 2-shaft CODOG system; 2 GE / Fiat LM2500 gas turbines 50,000 shp (37,000 kW); 2 GMT A230-20 diesel engines 7,800 shp (5,800 kW)
- Speed: 35 knots (65 km/h) with gas turbines; 21 knots (39 km/h) with diesel engines
- Range: 4,350 nautical miles (8,056 km) at 16 knots (30 km/h)
- Complement: 193 (22 officers)
- Sensors & processing systems: Selenia IPN-10 action data automation (CMS); 1 RAN-11L/X surface search radar; 1 RTN-10 × fire control radar; 2 navigation radar
- Armament: 1 OTO Melara 127/54 mm gun; 2 OTO Melara Twin 40L70 DARDO compact gun
- Aircraft carried: 1 AB-212ASW helicopter or; 1 ASH-3D Sea King (deck only)
- Aviation facilities: Fixed hangar for 1 medium helicopter

BAP Carvajal was the first out of four Carvajal-class frigates ordered by the Peruvian Navy in 1973. It was built by the Italian shipbuilder Cantieri Navali Riuniti at its shipyard in Riva Trigoso, Genoa. Though sea trials were initiated on 9 June 1977 its commissioning was delayed until 23 December 1979 due to delays in equipment deliveries by some subcontractors. In 1998 her flight deck was extended to allow ASH-3D Sea King helicopters to land and refuel, though the hangar is still too small to accommodate them.

Carvajal was named after Vice Admiral Melitón Carvajal (1845–1935) who fought in the War of the Pacific. On 26 December 2013, after being stripped of its missile armament, fire control systems and main radar, the ship was reclassified as Patrullera Oceánica (Offshore patrol vessel) and transferred to the Coast Guard under the name BAP Guardiamarina San Martin (PO-201).

== Sources ==
- Rodríguez, John, "Las fragatas Lupo: una breve mirada retrospectiva y perspectivas". Revista de Marina, Year 95, No. 3: 8-32 (July / December 2002).
- Jane's Fighting Ships 2005-2006
- Scheina, Robert L. & Smigielski, Adam (1995). "Peru". In Chumbley, Stephen (ed.). Conway's All the World's Fighting Ships, 1947–1995 (revised ed.). Naval Institute Press. pp. 303–307. ISBN 1-55750-132-7.
