= IRIS Khanjar =

Iranian Kaman-class fast attack craft

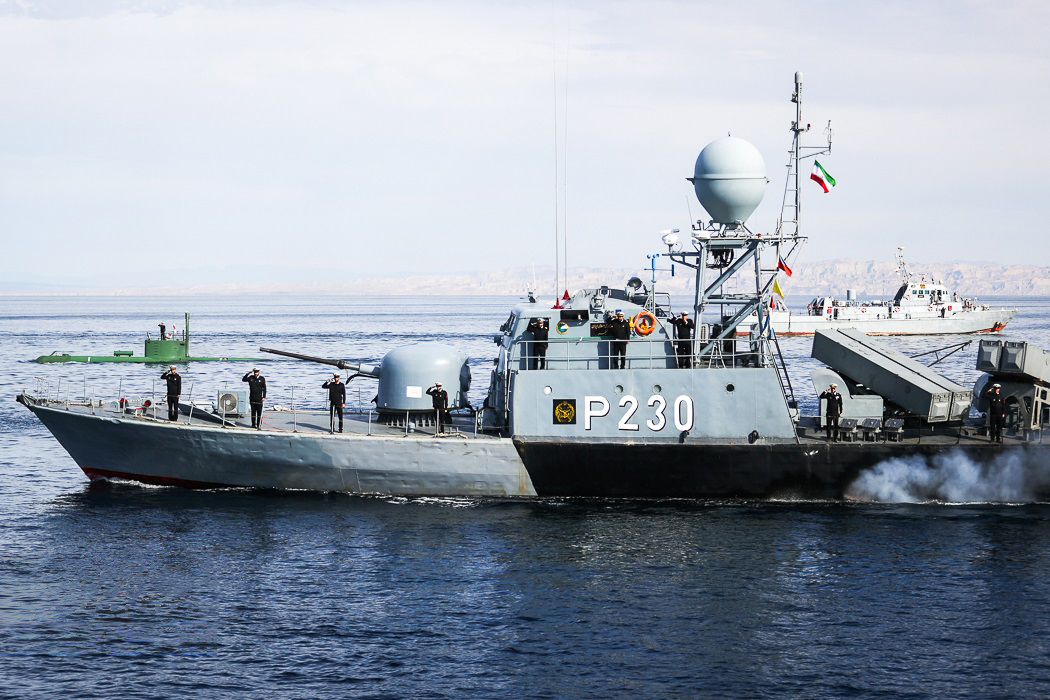

History

Iran
- Name: Khanjar
- Namesake: Khanjar
- Operator: Islamic Republic of Iran Navy
- Ordered: 14 October 1974
- Builder: Constructions de Mécaniques, Cherbourg
- Laid down: 17 January 1977
- Launched: 27 April 1978
- Commissioned: 1 August 1981
- Status: In service

General characteristics (as built)
- Class & type: Kaman-class fast attack craft
- Displacement: 249 tons standard; 275 tons full load
- Length: 47 m (154 ft 2 in)
- Beam: 7.1 m (23 ft 4 in)
- Draft: 1.9 m (6 ft 3 in)
- Installed power: 4 × MTU 16V538 TB91 diesels, 14,400 brake horsepower (10.7 MW)
- Propulsion: 4 × shafts
- Speed: 36 knots (67 km/h)
- Range: 2,000 miles (3,200 km) at 15 knots (28 km/h); 700 miles (1,100 km) at 33.7 knots (62.4 km/h)
- Complement: 30
- Armament: 4 × Harpoon (single cell); 1 × 76mm/65 (single compact); 1 × 40mm/70 Bofors gun
- Notes: As reported by Jane's (1979)

IRIS Khanjar (Persian: خنجر, lit. 'Dagger') is a Kaman-class fast attack craft in the Southern Fleet of the Islamic Republic of Iran Navy.

== Construction and commissioning ==
Neyzeh was built by the French company Constructions Mécaniques de Normandie at Cherbourg, as one of the second six contracted on 14 October 1974. Her keel was laid down on 17 January 1977 and on 27 April 1978, she was launched. Together with Neyzeh and Tabarzin, Khanjar was delivered in c.1980, but remained at the shipyard due to an embargo in effect by the French government. France decided to release the three, and all were commissioned into the fleet on 1 August 1981.

== Service history ==
In 2014, Khanjar and Neyzeh (P231) participated in a joint naval drill with Pakistan Navy in the Gulf of Oman. On 7 September 2016, she was dispatched –as part of the 43rd flotilla, along with her sister Falakhon (P226), amphibious vessel Lavan (514) and support ship Konarak (1403)– to secure international waters sailed by Iranian commercial ships, and on 28 September, she arrived in Karachi, Pakistan for a three-day port visit. She made another call to the same port on 10 October 2018, this time with Neyzeh (P231) and Bushehr (422), while deployed for an anti-piracy mission to the Arabian Sea and Gulf of Aden. The ship was modernized in 2017–2021.

== See also ==
- List of current ships of the Islamic Republic of Iran Navy
- List of military equipment manufactured in Iran
