= Hendijan-class vessel =

Iranian navy auxiliary ship class

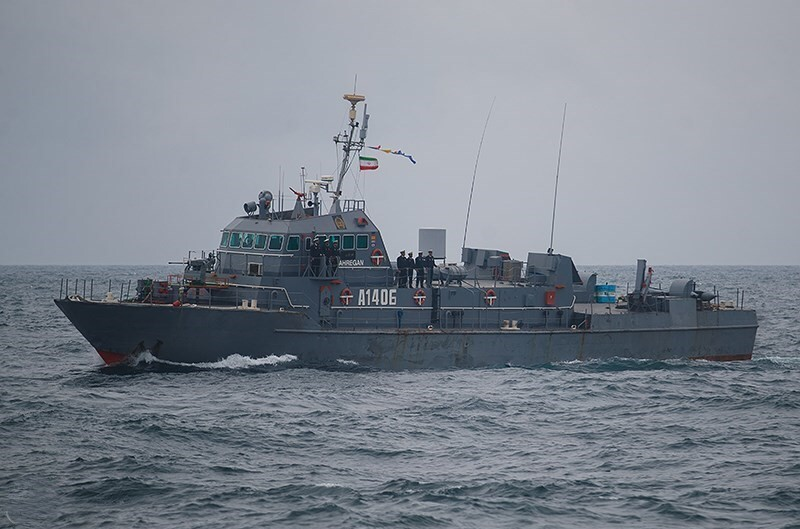

Class overview
- Builders: K Damen, Boven-Hardinxveld, Netherlands; Marine Industries Organization, Iran
- Operators: Islamic Republic of Iran Navy
- Built: 1988–1991
- Completed: 12
- Active: 11
- Lost: 1

General characteristics
- Type: Auxiliary ship
- Displacement: 420 tons full load
- Length: 47 m (154 ft 2 in)
- Beam: 8.55 m (28 ft 1 in)
- Draught: 2.86 m (9 ft 5 in)
- Installed power: Diesel
- Propulsion: 2 × Mitsubishi S16MPTK engines, 6,600 horsepower (4.9 MW); 2 × shafts
- Speed: 25 knots (46 km/h)
- Complement: 15+90 scientists

Hendijan (Persian: هندیجان, also known as MIG-S-4700) is a class of auxiliary ships operated by the Islamic Republic of Iran Navy. The first eight of this class were built by Dutch Damen Group, and the rest by Iran's Marine Industries Organization, Bandar Abbas. According to Jane's, ships of the class are tenders that are used for coastal surveillance and one of them is used as a training ship. IISS classifies all vessels as patrol boats.

== Design ==
=== Dimensions and machinery ===
The ships have a displacement of 420 t (410 long tons) at full load, with their cargo capacity recorded as 40 tons on a 95 cubic metres (124 cu yd) space. The class design is 47 m (154 ft 2 in) long, would have a beam of 8.55 m (28 ft 1 in) and a draft of 2.86 m (9 ft 5 in). It uses two shafts, powered by two Mitsubishi S16MPTK diesel engines. This system was designed to provide 6,600 horsepower (4.9 MW) for an estimated top speed of 25 knots (46 km/h; 29 mph).

=== Sensors and processing systems ===
For navigation, Hendijan-class vessels rely on Raccal Decca or China RM 1070A on I-band. The missiles use active radar homing to 120 km (65 nmi) at 0.9 Mach.

=== Armament ===
Hendijan-class vessels are reportedly equipped with one 20 mm GAM-BO1 cannon and two 12.7 mm machine guns. At least two of them (Kalat and Sirik) were modified to fire for Noor anti-ship cruise missile, as of 2015. IISS mentions three equipped with AShM in 2020.

== Ships in the class ==
The ships in the class are:

| Ship | Namesake | Hull number | Status |
|---|---|---|---|
| IRIS Hendijan | Hendijan | 1401 | In service |
| IRIS Sirik | Sirik | 1402 | In service |
| IRIS Konarak | Konarak | 1403 | Out of service |
| IRIS Gavatar | Gavatar | 1404 | In service |
| IRIS Moqam | Moqam | 1405 | In service |
| IRIS Bahregan (ex-Geno) | Bahregan | 1406 | In service |
| IRIS Kalat | Kalat | 1407 | In service |
| IRIS Ganaveh | Ganaveh | 1408 | In service |
| IRIS Rostami | Rostami | 1409 | In service |
| IRIS Nayband | Nayband | 1410 | In service |
| IRIS Macham | Unknown | Unknown | In service |
| IRIS Khoramshahr | Khoramshahr | Unknown | In service |
