= IRIS Nooh =

Iranian class of attack submarine

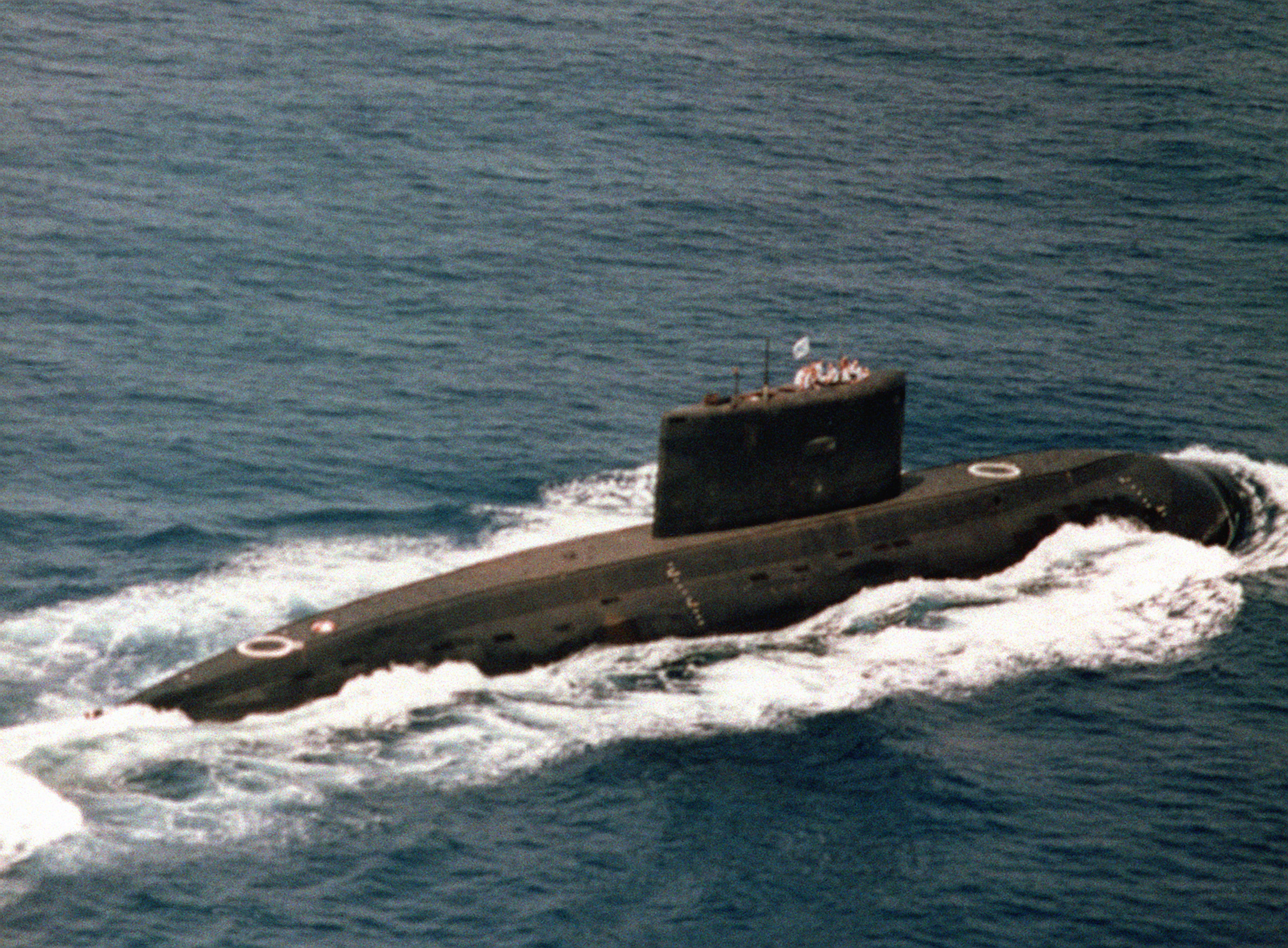
- Nooh pictured by American forces en route to Iran

History

Iran
- Name: Nooh
- Namesake: Noah
- Operator: Islamic Republic of Iran Navy
- Ordered: 1988
- Builder: Admiralty Shipyard
- Cost: $375 million
- Laid down: 1989
- Launched: 1992
- Commissioned: 6 June 1993
- Refit: 2017
- Home port: Bandar Abbas
- Identification: 902
- Status: In active service

General characteristics
- Class & type: Kilo-class submarine
- Displacement: 2,356 tons surfaced, 3,076 tons submerged
- Length: 72.6 m (238 ft 2 in)
- Beam: 9.9 m (32 ft 6 in)
- Draft: 6.6 m (21 ft 8 in)
- Installed power: Diesel-electric
- Propulsion: 2 × 3,650 horsepower (2.72 MW) Generators; 1 × 5,500 horsepower (4.1 MW) Propulsion motor; 1 × 130 horsepower (97 kW) Economic speed motor; 2 × 204 horsepower (152 kW) Auxiliary propulsion motor; 1 × Shaft; 2 × Diesels
- Speed: Surfaced; 10 knots (19 km/h); Snorkel mode; 9 knots (17 km/h); Submerged; 17 knots (31 km/h)
- Range: Snorkel mode; 6,000 mi (9,700 km) at 7 kn (13 km/h); Submerged; 400 mi (640 km) at 3 kn (5.6 km/h)
- Test depth: Normally 240 m (790 ft)
- Complement: 53 (12 officers)
- Armament: 18 torpedoes; 24 mines in lieu of torpedo tube

IRIS Nooh (also spelt Nuh or Nouh; Persian: زیردریایی نوح, lit. 'Noah') is the second Kilo-class attack submarine of Islamic Republic of Iran Navy, serving in the Southern Fleet.

== Construction and commissioning ==
The contract to build Nooh and Taregh was signed in 1988. It was reportedly worth $750 million for two submarines, with an option for the third. Her keel was laid down at Admiralty Shipyard in Saint Petersburg in 1989. She was launched in 1992 and was commissioned on 6 June 1993.

The submarine is named after Noah.

== Service history ==
According to Jane's, there is no proof that the submarine has ever returned to Russia for a refit. As of September 2017, Nooh was under some major repairs by Iranian personnel in the naval factories.

== See also ==
- List of current ships of the Islamic Republic of Iran Navy
