= Iranian vessel Mozaffari =

Iranian naval vessel

History

Belgium
- Name: Selika
- Owner: Robert Osterrieth
- Launched: 1899
- Home port: Antwerp
- Fate: Sold

History

Iran
- Namesake: Mozaffar ad-Din Shah Qajar
- Operator: Persian Customs
- Acquired: 1902
- Commissioned: 1903
- Renamed: Mozaffari
- Captured: 1914

History

United Kingdom
- Operator: Royal Navy
- Commissioned: 1914
- Decommissioned: 1918
- Refit: 1918
- Home port: Bombay
- Fate: Returned to Iran

History

Iran
- Operator: Imperial Iranian Navy
- Recommissioned: 1918
- Stricken: c. 1936
- Fate: Stricken c.1936

General characteristics
- Displacement: 400 tonnes
- Length: 40.0 m (131 ft 3 in)
- Beam: 8.0 m (26 ft 3 in)
- Draft: 3.5 m (11 ft 6 in)
- Propulsion: Steam
- Speed: 12 knots (22 km/h)

Mozaffari (Persian: مظفری) was a steam yacht that was converted to a gunboat. Launched in 1899 as a Belgian merchant ship, it was purchased as a royal yacht for Mozaffar ad-Din Shah Qajar and served Persian navy from 1902 to 1914; and again between 1918 and 1936. Royal Navy seized her in 1914 and used the vessel until 1918 during World War I.

== History ==
The vessel was built in Nantes, France in 1899, according to Jane's. Originally named Selika, she was owned by Robert Osterrieth. Soon after it was launched, Adrien de Gerlache took over as her captain for an expedition to the Persian Gulf, seeking pearl. On her journey Selika decked at Muscat and Bahrain.

In April 1904, Mozaffari was used in an operation to hoist Persian flag at Abu Musa and Tunbs after removing those of Sharjah.

An American diplomat reported in 1925 that Persepolis and Mozaffari were the two largest vessels of Iran.

She was stricken c. 1936.

== See also ==
- Historical Iranian Navy vessels
