= BAP Ferré (CM-27) =

Pohang-class corvette

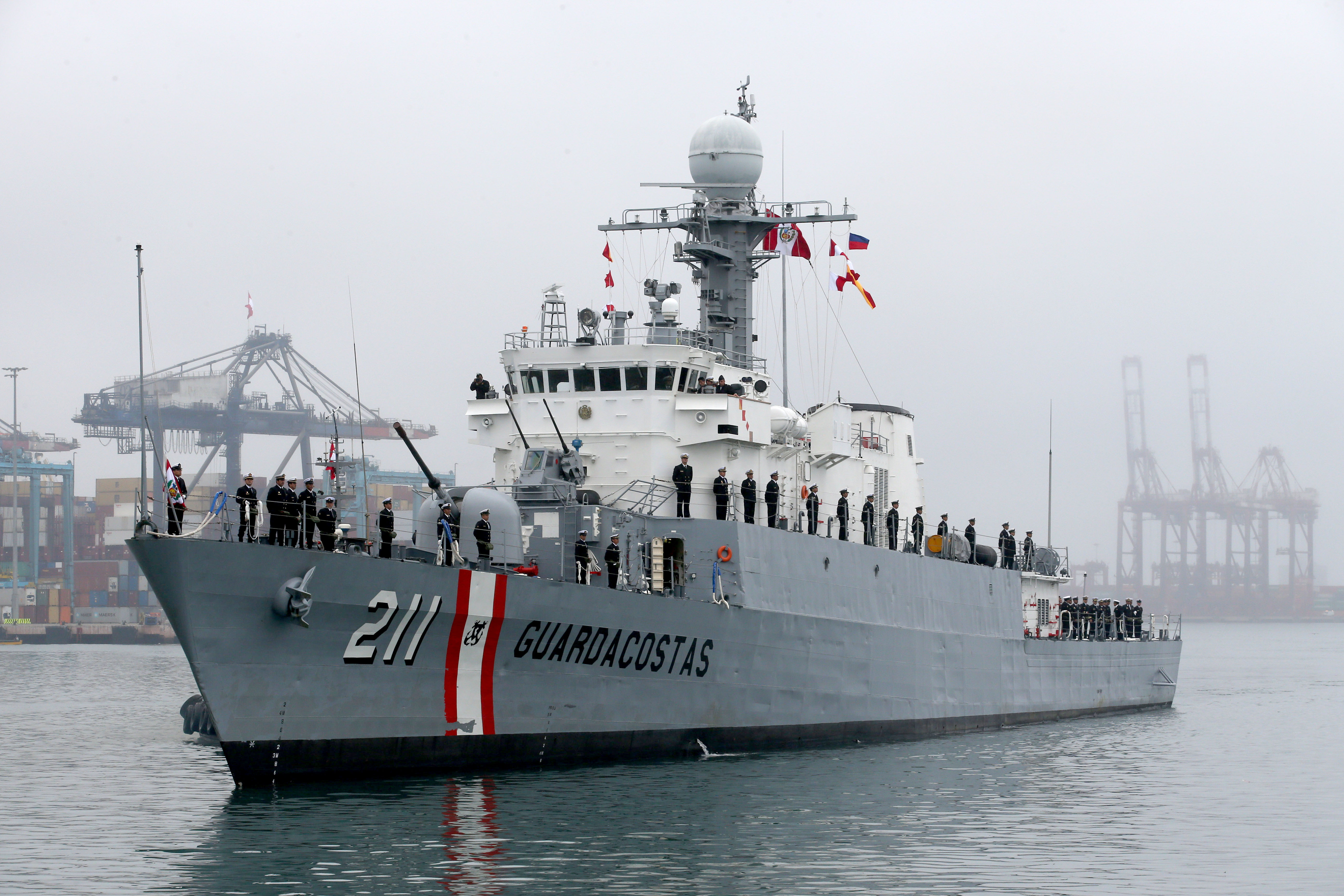
- BAP Ferré on 15 July 2016

History

South Korea
- Name: Gyeongju; (경주)
- Namesake: Gyeongju
- Builder: Hyundai, Ulsan
- Launched: 8 June 1984
- Commissioned: 1 May 1985
- Decommissioned: 30 December 2014
- Identification: Pennant number: PCC-758
- Fate: Transferred to Peruvian Coast Guard

Peru
- Name: Ferré
- Namesake: Diego Ferré
- Operator: Peruvian Navy
- Acquired: 15 July 2016
- Commissioned: 15 July 2016
- Reclassified: CM-27
- Home port: Callao
- Identification: Pennant number: PM-211, CM-27
- Status: Active

General characteristics
- Class & type: Pohang-class corvette
- Displacement: 1,220 tons
- Length: 289.7 ft (88 m)
- Beam: 33 ft (10 m)
- Draft: 2.9 ft (0.88 m)
- Installed power: 2 × MTU 6V396 TC52 diesel generators
- Propulsion: Combined diesel or gas (CODOG) arrangement: 2 × MTU 12V956 TB82 diesel engines producing combined total of 6,260 shp (4,670 kW); 1 × General Electric LM2500 PB gas turbines generating 27,820 shp (20,700 kW)
- Speed: 32 knots (59 km/h; 37 mph) maximum
- Range: 4,000 nmi (7,400 km; 4,600 mi) at 15 knots (28 km/h; 17 mph) using diesel engines
- Endurance: 20 days
- Boats & landing craft carried: 2 × RHIB
- Crew: 118
- Sensors & processing systems: X-band & S-band navigational radars; Raytheon AN/SPS-64(V)5B surface search radar; Signaal (Thales Nederland) WM-28 Fire Control System; Signaal (Thales Nederland) LIOD optronic director; Raytheon AN/SQS-58 hull mounted passive/active sonar
- Electronic warfare & decoys: 2 × Loral Hycor Mk 34 RBOC Chaff and Decoy Launching System
- Armament: 2 × Oto Melara 76 mm/62 caliber Compact naval guns; 2 × Otobreda 40 mm L/70 twin naval guns; 2 × Mk 32 triple torpedo tubes; 2 × Mk 9 Depth charge racks; 6 × M2HB Browning .50 caliber machine guns

BAP Ferré (CM-27) or former Republic of Korea Navy ship ROKS Gyeongju (PCC-758) is a Pohang-class corvette under the Peruvian Navy. The ship was transferred first to the Peruvian Coast Guard from South Korea under the name BAP Ferré (PM-211) before under the fleet of the Peruvian Navy.

== Development and design ==
The Pohang class is a series of corvettes built by different Korean shipbuilding companies. The class consists of 24 ships and some after decommissioning were sold or given to other countries. There are five different types of designs in the class from Flight II to Flight VI.

== Construction and career ==
Gyeongju was launched on 8 June 1984 by Hyundai Heavy Industries in Ulsan. Commissioned on 1 May 1985 and decommissioned on 30 December 2014. An agreement between the Republic of South Korea and the Republic of Peru on October 20, 2015.

She was transferred to the Peruvian Coast Guard under the designation of BAP Ferré (PM-211). The ship arrived at the port of Callao on 15 July 2016, joining the active service of the Directorate of Captaincies and Coast Guard of the Peruvian Navy.

In August 2018, BAP Ferré was reclassified as a missile corvette (CM-27) and incorporated into its Surface Force.

== Gallery ==
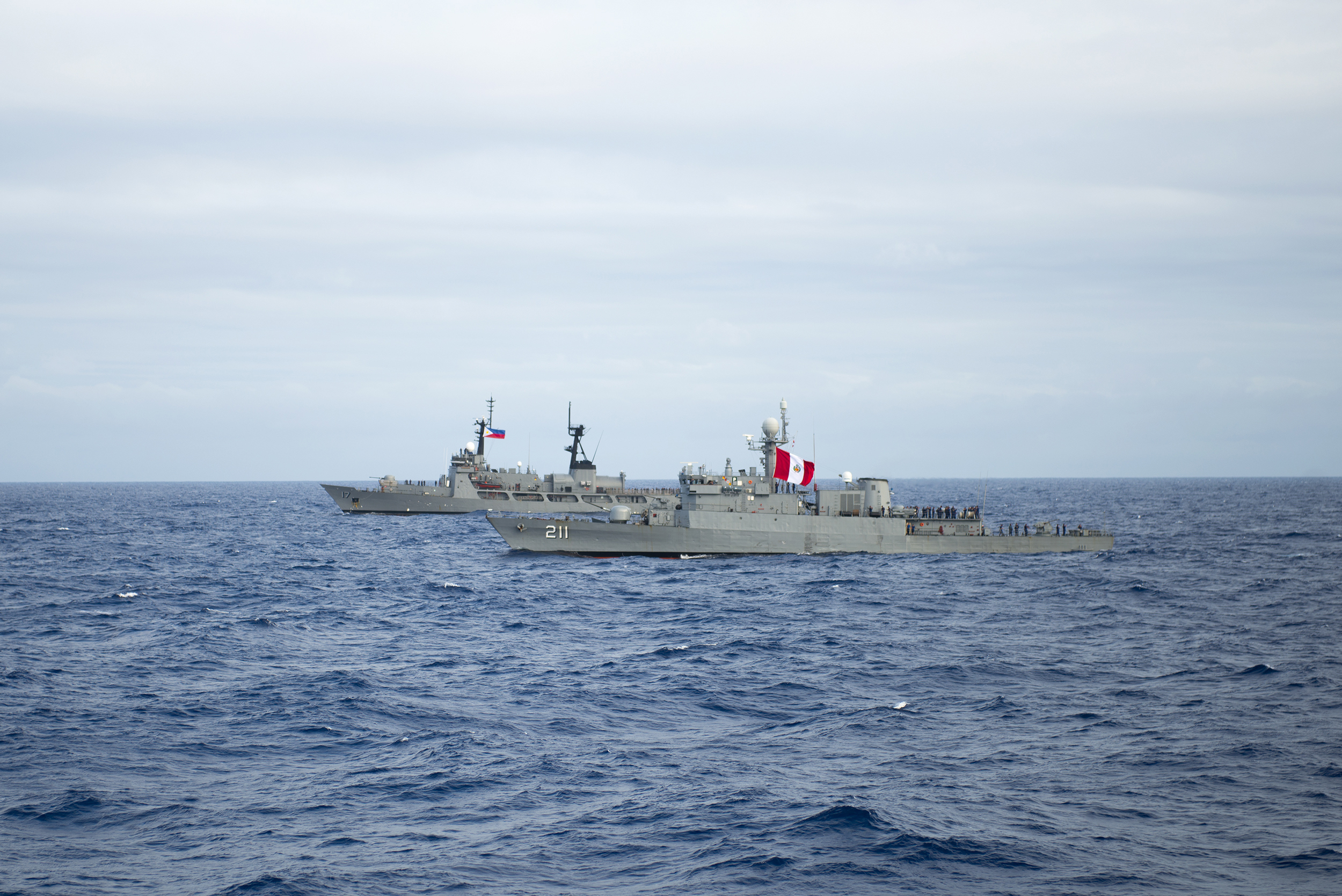
BAP Ferré and BRP Andrés Bonifacio during RIMPAC 2018.

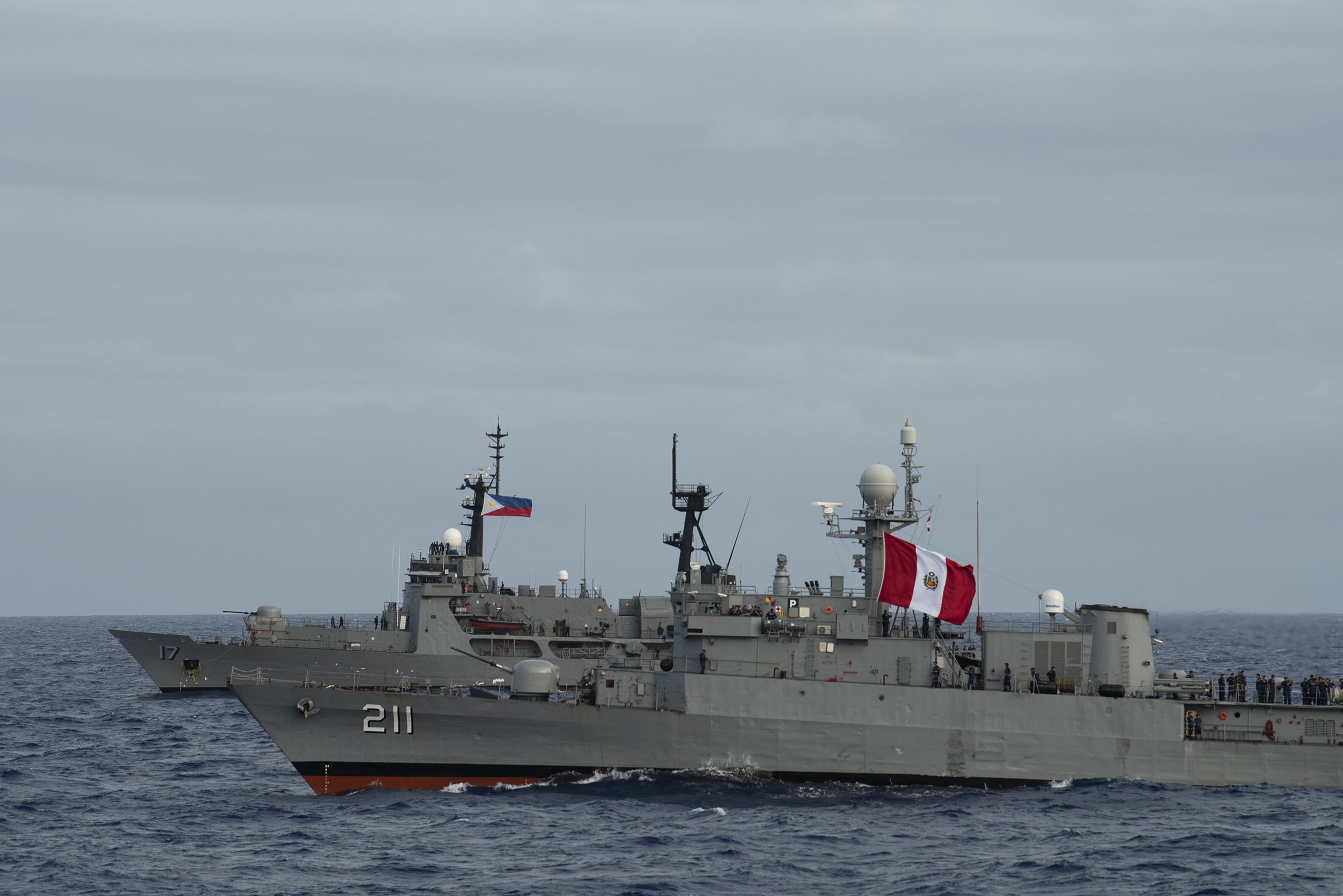
BAP Ferré and BRP Andrés Bonifacio during RIMPAC 2018.
