= IRIS Neyzeh =

1981 Iranian fast attack craft

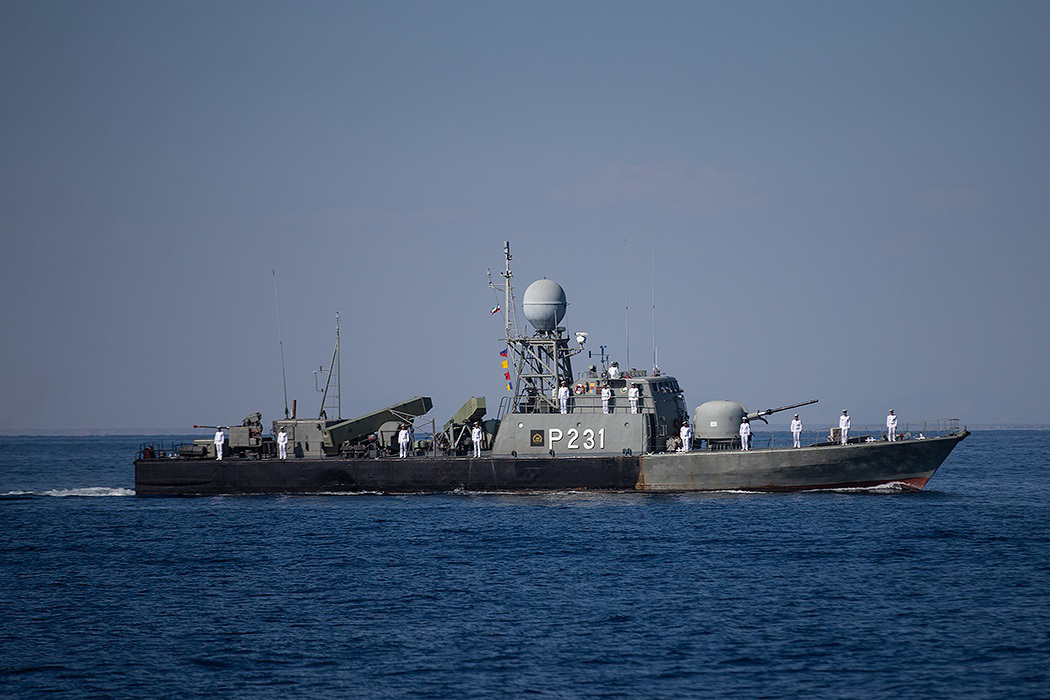

History

Iran
- Name: Neyzeh
- Namesake: Neyzeh
- Operator: Islamic Republic of Iran Navy
- Ordered: 14 October 1974
- Builder: Constructions de Mécaniques, Cherbourg
- Laid down: 12 September 1977
- Launched: 5 July 1978
- Commissioned: 1 August 1981
- Refit: 2011–2013
- Status: In service

General characteristics (as built)
- Class & type: Kaman-class fast attack craft
- Displacement: 249 tons standard; 275 tons full load
- Length: 47 m (154 ft 2 in)
- Beam: 7.1 m (23 ft 4 in)
- Draft: 1.9 m (6 ft 3 in)
- Installed power: 4 × MTU 16V538 TB91 diesels, 14,400 brake horsepower (10.7 MW)
- Propulsion: 4 × shafts
- Speed: 36 knots (67 km/h)
- Range: 2,000 miles (3,200 km) at 15 knots (28 km/h); 700 miles (1,100 km) at 33.7 knots (62.4 km/h)
- Complement: 30
- Armament: 4 × Harpoon (single cell); 1 × 76mm/65 (single compact); 1 × 40mm/70 Bofors gun
- Notes: As reported by Jane's (1979)

IRIS Neyzeh (Persian: نیزه, lit. 'Spear') is a Kaman-class fast attack craft in the Southern Fleet of the Islamic Republic of Iran Navy.

== Construction and commissioning ==
Neyzeh was built by the French company Constructions Mécaniques de Normandie at Cherbourg, as one of the second six contracted on 14 October 1974. Her keel was laid down on 12 September 1977 and on 5 July 1978, she was launched. Together with Khanjar and Tabarzin, Falakhon was delivered in c.1980, but remained at the shipyard due to an embargo in effect by the French government. France decided to release the three, and all were commissioned into the fleet on 1 August 1981.

== Service history ==
On 1 December 2013, Neyzeh was put into service again after an overhaul that took 30 months. Reportedly, she has been equipped with Gader missiles. In 2014, Khanjar and Neyzeh were deployed for a joint drill with Pakistan Navy in the Gulf of Oman. Between 2–16 October 2018, she was deployed for an anti-piracy mission to the Arabian Sea and Gulf of Aden, along with her sister Khanjar and support ship Bushehr. On the way back home, they made a port call to Karachi and participated in a two-day joint littoral search and rescue drill with Pakistan Navy. She was among Iranian naval vessels participating in the four-day joint wargame in December 2019, with Russian Navy and the People's Liberation Army Navy of China, named 'Marine Security Belt'.

== See also ==
- List of current ships of the Islamic Republic of Iran Navy
- List of military equipment manufactured in Iran
