= Kalat, Tangestan =

Kalat كلات
- Village
- Location within Iran
- Coordinates: 28°24′01″N 51°08′56″E
- Country: Iran
- Province: Bushehr
- County: Tangestan
- Bakhsh: Delvar
- Rural District: Bu ol Kheyr

Population (2006)
  - Total: 369
- Time zone: UTC+3:30 (IRST)
  - Summer (DST): UTC+4:30 (IRDT)

Kalat (Persian: كلات, also Romanized as Kalāt and Kelāt; also known as Kalāk and Qalat) is a village in Bu ol Kheyr Rural District, Delvar District, Tangestan County, Bushehr Province, Iran. At the 2006 census, its population was 369, in 79 families.
