= Karbala-class landing ship =

Iranian class of landing ships

Class overview
- Builders: Marine Industries Organization
- Operators: Islamic Republic of Iran Navy
- In service: 1995–present

General characteristics
- Type: Landing Ship Logistics
- Displacement: 280 tons full load
- Length: 37 m (121 ft 5 in)
- Beam: 8 m (26 ft 3 in)
- Draught: 1.5 m (4 ft 11 in)
- Installed power: Diesel
- Propulsion: 2 × MWM TBD 234 VB, 879 horsepower (0.655 MW); 2 × shafts
- Speed: 10 knots (19 km/h)
- Range: 400 nautical miles (740 km) at 10 knots (19 km/h)
- Complement: 8

The Karbala (Persian: کربلا, also known as MIG-S-3700) is a class of Landing Ship Logistics operated by the Islamic Republic of Iran Navy.

== History ==
The ship is assembled at Shahid Darvishi Marine Industries, Bandar Abbas.

== Ships in the class ==
Known ships in commission the class are:

Ship	Namesake	Pennant number	Launched	Status
Fouque	Unknown	101	June 1998	In service
Qeshm	Qeshm Island	504	September 1995	In service
Hormoz	Hormuz Island	505	September 1995	In service
Farour	Faror Island	506	Unknown	In service
Unknown	Unknown	507	Unknown	In service
Unknown	Unknown	508	Unknown	In service

According to 2015 edition of Jane's Fighting Ships, there are more ships of this class in commercial service and navy can acquire more in case they are required.
