= IRIS Bushehr =

Iranian ship

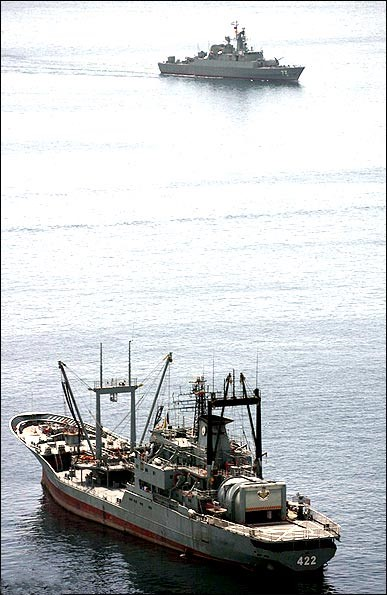
- IRIS Bushehr (bottom)

History

/ Pahlavi Iran / Iran
- Name: Bushehr
- Namesake: Bushehr
- Owner: Pahlavi Iran / Islamic Republic of Iran
- Operator: Imperial Iranian Navy until 1979 / Islamic Republic of Iran Navy
- Builder: C. Lühring Yard, Brake, Lower Saxony, West Germany
- Launched: March 1974
- Commissioned: November 1974
- Home port: Bandar Abbas, Iran
- Identification: Hull number: PC313-01
- Status: In active service

General characteristics
- Class & type: Bandar Abbas-class replenishment ship
- Tonnage: 3,237 GT; 3,302 DWT
- Displacement: 4,748 tons full load
- Length: 108 m (354 ft 4 in)
- Beam: 16.6 m (54 ft 6 in)
- Draught: 4.5 m (14 ft 9 in)
- Installed power: Diesel
- Propulsion: 2 × MAN 6L 52/55 engines, 12,060 horsepower (8.99 MW); 2 × shafts
- Speed: 20 knots (37 km/h; 23 mph)
- Range: 3,500 nmi (6,500 km) at 16 knots (30 km/h)
- Complement: 59
- Armament: 3 × GAM-B01 20 mm; 2 × 12.7 mm machine guns
- Aircraft carried: 1 helicopter
- Aviation facilities: 1 telescopic hangar

IRIS Bushehr is the second ship of the Bandar Abbas class that are used as fleet supply ships and are operated by the Islamic Republic of Iran Navy. It is named after the port city of Bushehr, home to an important naval base of Iran Navy. The ship is operated as a combined tanker and store ship, which carries victuals, armaments, and general stores. The vessel does not have facilities for replenishment at sea (RAS).

During the 2026 Iran war, the ship and her crew of 208 sailors was interned by the Sri Lankan Navy at Trincomalee and the crew were transferred to Welisara Naval Base.

== See also ==
- IRIS Bandar Abbas
