= Parvin-class patrol craft =

Iranian class of large patrol craft

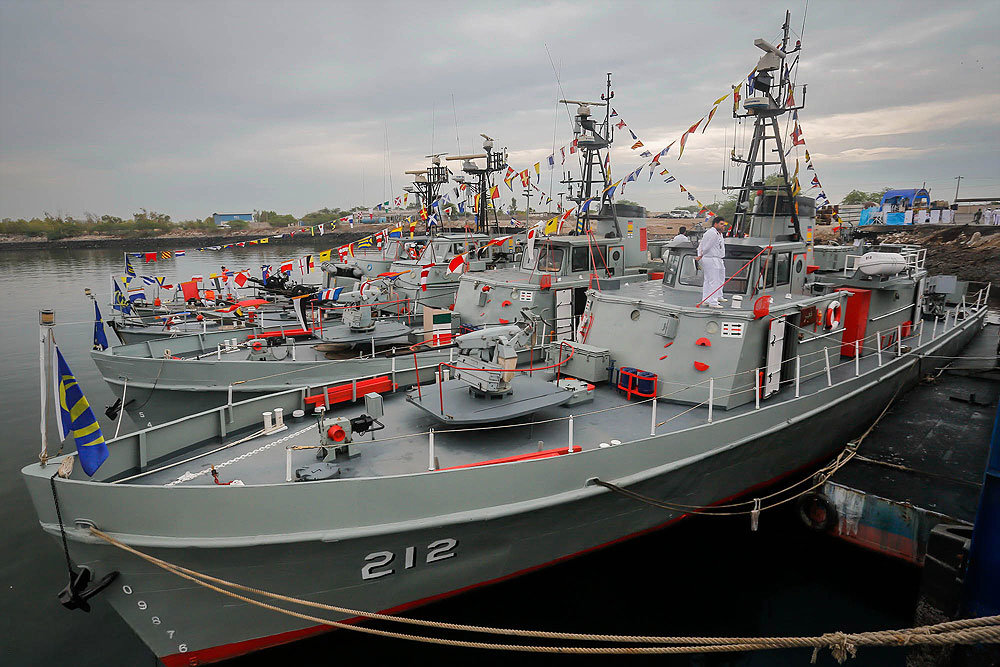

Class overview
- Builders: Peterson Builders, Sturgeon Bay
- Operators: Islamic Republic of Iran Navy
- In service: 1967–present
- Completed: 3
- Active: 3

General characteristics
- Type: Large patrol craft
- Displacement: 100/105 tons standard; 146/150 tons full load
- Length: 30.5–30.8 m (100–101 ft)
- Beam: 6.5–6.7 m (21–22 ft)
- Draught: 2.5–3.1 m (8.2–10.2 ft)
- Installed power: Diesel
- Propulsion: 8 × GM 6-71 engines, 2,040 horsepower (1.52 MW); 2 × shafts
- Speed: 15–22 kn (28–41 km/h)
- Range: 1,140 nmi (2,110 km) at 17 knots (31 km/h); 1,500 nmi (2,800 km) at 10 knots (19 km/h)
- Complement: 20

The Parvin (Persian: پروین) is a class of large patrol craft operated by the Islamic Republic of Iran Navy. They ships in the class are modified versions of PGM-71 vessels, all built by the American shipyard Peterson Builders.

== Design ==
Sources differ in recording characteristics of Parvin class vessels.

According to Jane's Fighting Ships, the ships have a standard displacement of 100 tonnes (98 long tons) and 150 t (150 long tons) at full load. Conway's All the World's Fighting Ships puts the numbers at 105 tonnes (103 long tons) and 146 tonnes (144 long tons).

The class design is 30.8 m (101 ft) long, would have a beam of 6.5 m (21 ft) and a draft of 2.5 m (8 ft 2 in) on the report of Jane's, while Conway's mentions the dimensions as 30.5 m (100 ft) × 6.7 m (22 ft) × 3.1 m (10 ft).

Both sources agree that the ships are powered by eight General Motors diesel engines totaling 2,040 horsepower (1.52 MW) that rotate a pair of shafts, but the engine models are variously cited GM 8-71 and GM 6-71. The system can reach a top speed of 15 knots (28 km/h) as stated by Conway's, albeit Jane's mentions 22 knots (41 km/h). The ranges given for the class are 1,140 nmi (2,110 km) at 17 knots (31 km/h) and 1,500 nmi (2,800 km) at 10 knots (19 km/h).

Original armament of the ships reportedly included five guns: 12.7mm and 20mm each two and one 40mm. French sources give one 40mm and four 20mm machine guns, as well as a pair of Mk22 Mousetrap and DC racks. As of 2015, they are reported to be armed with five guns consisting an old variant of Bofors 40 mm/60, a couple of Oerlikon GAI-BO1 20mm in addition to two 12.7 machine guns. They are also equipped with four racks of depth charge (with eight US Mk 6), and two missile launchers of unknown type are installed on them after refit.

The original radar was model 303 of Decca Radar, while the current surface search system is known to be working on I-band. The sonar is a high-frequency hull-mounted active attack SQS-17B but is allegedly unlikely to be serviceable per Jane's.

Crew on each ship of this class totals 20 officers and men.

== Ships in the class ==
The ships in the class are:

Ship	Namesake	Pennant number	Commissioned	Status
IRIS Parvin (ex-PGM 103)	Pleione	211	1967	In service
IRIS Bahram (ex-PGM 112)	Mars	212	1969	In service
IRIS Nahid (ex-PGM 122)	Venus	213	1970	In service
