= IRIS Konarak =

Iranian ship

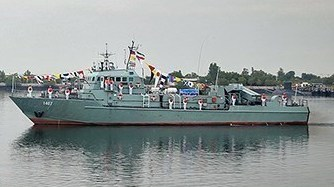
- Konarak

History

Iran
- Name: Konarak
- Namesake: Konarak
- Owner: Islamic Republic of Iran Navy
- Builder: K Damen, Boven-Hardinxveld, Netherlands
- In service: 1988–2020
- Out of service: 10 May 2020
- Refit: 2018
- Identification: Pennant number: A1403; Code letters: EQCM

General characteristics
- Class & type: Hendijan-class support vessel
- Displacement: 446 long tons (453 t) standard; 650 long tons (660 t) full load
- Length: 47 m (154 ft) oa; 44.6 m (146 ft) pp
- Beam: 8.55 m (28.1 ft)
- Draft: 2.86 m (9 ft 5 in)
- Installed power: 6,200 hp (4,600 kW)
- Propulsion: 2 × Mitsubishi S16MPTK diesel engines; 2 × shafts
- Speed: 21 kn (39 km/h; 24 mph)
- Complement: 15
- Sensors & processing systems: Decca 2070 – radar, surface search & navigation
- Armament: 1 × 20 mm (0.79 in)/90 Oerlikon cannon; 4 × Nasr-1 anti-ship missile

Konarak (Persian: کنارک) was a Hendijan-class support vessel of the Iranian Navy. It was built in the Netherlands and was put into service since 1988. Originally intended as a support and logistics ship, Konarak was overhauled in 2018, and was armed with anti-ship missiles. The vessel was struck by a missile fired from the Iranian frigate Jamaran in a friendly fire incident during training on 10 May 2020, killing 19 sailors.

== Description ==
Konarak was built in 1988, at the K. Damen Shipyards, in Boven-Hardinxveld, the Netherlands, as hull number 1403. It was ordered and purchased before the 1979 Iranian Revolution. The twelve Hendijan-class support vessels were constructed in the 1980s and 1990s, six of them at the K. Damen Shipyards, and the remainder under contract in Iran. Questions were raised in the Dutch parliament over the delivery of the ships during the 1980–1988 Iran–Iraq War but as the ships were unarmed and not combatant vessels, an export license was not necessary. The Netherlands also delivered a tug and a water tanker to the Iranian Navy during this period. Konarak was in service since 1988.

Konarak had a displacement of 650 long tons (660 t) at full load, was 47 m (154 ft) in overall length, 8.55 m (28.1 ft) wide, and had a draft of 2.86 m (9 ft 5 in). It was capable of carrying 40 tonnes (39 long tons; 44 short tons) of cargo on deck, 95 cubic metres (3,400 cu ft) in its holds/tanks, and 90 troops.

== Service ==
Ships of the Hendijan class have been used as support vessels and in logistics roles. In recent years they have been repurposed as combatant vessels with anti-shipping weapons installed. Konarak was overhauled in 2018 and was given missile-launch capability and could be used to lay mines. Konarak had no anti-missile weaponry, though it may have had a 20 mm (0.79 in) Oerlikon cannon and four Nasr-1 anti-ship missiles. It joined the Iranian naval force based at the city of Konarak on 7 October 2018.

=== 2020 friendly fire incident ===
On 10 May 2020, the ship was struck by a Noor missile fired from the Iranian frigate Jamaran when in the Strait of Hormuz. Official Iranian TV initially reported one fatality in the incident, but this was later revised to 19 killed and 15 injured. Konarak was involved as a tender, setting out targets for target practice for missiles from Jamaran. Konarak reportedly failed to distance itself sufficiently from the target prior to the launch and was struck by a missile. The missile may have automatically locked onto Konarak as the largest target or else been set as the target by human error. After the incident, Konarak was towed to port in order to undergo a technical inspection. Footage published by the Iranian state broadcaster IRIB showed the ship down heavily by the bow with its superstructure devastated and smoke visible from fires.

== Final fate ==
In 2021, IRIS Konarak was described as "lost" due to the friendly fire incident of May 2020.

== See also ==
- List of current ships of the Islamic Republic of Iran Navy
- PNS Zulfiqar (K265)
- Ukraine International Airlines Flight 752
- USS Harwood (DD-861)
