= Iranian vessel Persepolis =

Iron-hulled Persian warship, 1885–1936

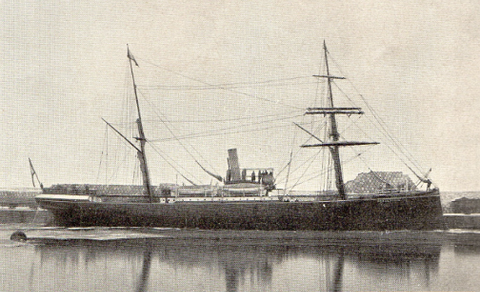

History

Iran
- Name: Persepolis
- Namesake: Persepolis
- Builder: AG Weser
- Yard number: 75
- Launched: 29 October 1884
- Commissioned: 1885
- Stricken: c. 1925
- Home port: Khorramshahr
- Fate: Scrapped, c. 1936

General characteristics
- Displacement: 1,200 tonnes
- Length: 67.5 m (221 ft 5 in)
- Beam: 10.0 m (32 ft 10 in)
- Installed power: Steam; 440 horsepower
- Propulsion: 1 × Shaft
- Speed: 10 knots (19 km/h)
- Armament: 5 × Breech-loading gun (1903)

Persepolis (Persian: پرسپولیس) was the first modern vessel of the Iranian Navy. A three-island iron-hulled vessel, it was fitted with two masts, one funnel and a ram bow. Officially classified as a cruiser, its type has been alternatively described as a gunboat or a dispatch vessel.

Commissioned in 1885, she served until the mid-1920s, when it was reported that she was no longer in active service. An American diplomat reported in 1925 that Persepolis and the gunboat Mozaffari were the two largest vessels of Iran.

== Construction and commissioning ==
Persepolis was built by the German AG Weser shipbuilding company at Bremen, on orders from the Persian government. The shipbuilder assigned production number 75 to the vessel and launched it on 29 October 1884. She was acquired by Persia in 1885, having been delivered by German crew to her future home port in Khorramshahr. In his travel book A Ride to India across Persia and Baluchistan, Harry de Windt wrote that the Persepolis cost over £30,000.

== Service history ==
According to Conway's All the World's Fighting Ships, she "spent most of her time at mooring, outwardly smart but rarely serviceable" because it was expensive for maintenance and its machinery was neglected. In 1925, the ship was discarded. Although Conway's reports that she was scrapped about 1936, the remains of her hull sit outside the Maritime Museum of the Sea and Persian Gulf in Bushehr, Iran.

== See also ==
- List of former Iranian naval vessels
