= Besat-class submarine =

Iranian attack submarine class

Class overview
- Builders: Marine Industries Organization
- Operators: Islamic Republic of Iran Navy
- Preceded by: Fateh class
- Built: 2020–present
- Planned: 2
- Building: 1

General characteristics
- Tonnage: 4,000 t (4,400 tons)
- Length: 70 m (230 ft)
- Propulsion: Air independent propulsion
- Sensors & processing systems: Radar, Optical and Electro-optical sights
- Armament: Torpedoes, Missiles (Surface-to-surface and Surface-to-air)

The Besat (Persian: بعثت, lit. 'prophetic mission') is an upcoming class of attack submarine under construction by Iran.

== History ==
On 25 August 2008, Iranian defence minister Mostafa Mohammad-Najjar announced Iran had started building the first submarine of the class named Qaaem, which will be capable of carrying and firing various types of torpedoes and undersea missiles. Since 2012, Iranian officials have not mentioned Qaaem class and it is unclear whether it has been further developed, or has turned into Besat project.

On 25 April 2023, Iranian Navy commander announced that the first Besat class submarine will likely join the navy in 1 or 2 years. He also said the submarine will be equipped with surface-to-surface and surface-to-air missiles as well as torpedoes.

== See also ==
- List of naval ship classes of Iran
- List of military equipment manufactured in Iran
