= IRIS Bandar Abbas =

Iranian ship

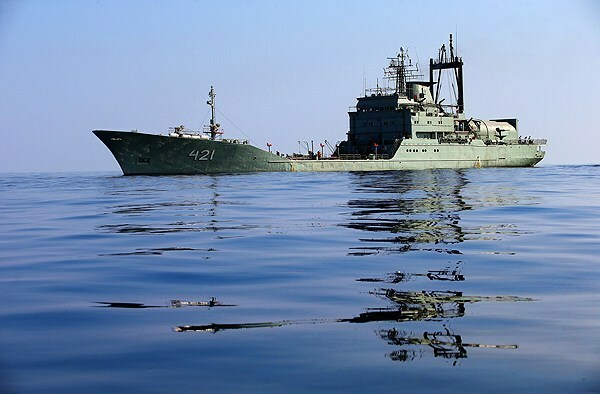

History

Iran
- Name: Bandar Abbas
- Namesake: Bandar Abbas
- Owner: Iran
- Builder: C. Lühring Yard, Brake, Lower Saxony, Germany
- Launched: 1973
- Commissioned: April 1974
- Home port: Bandar Abbas, Iran
- Identification: Hull number: PC313-01
- Status: In active service

General characteristics
- Class & type: Bandar Abbas-class replenishment ship
- Tonnage: 3,237 GT; 3,302 DWT
- Displacement: 4,748 tons full load
- Length: 108 m (354 ft 4 in)
- Beam: 16.6 m (54 ft 6 in)
- Draught: 4.5 m (14 ft 9 in)
- Installed power: Diesel
- Propulsion: 2 × MAN 6L 52/55 engines, 12,060 horsepower (8.99 MW); 2 × shafts
- Speed: 20 knots (37 km/h; 23 mph)
- Range: 3,500 nmi (6,500 km) at 16 knots (30 km/h)
- Complement: 59
- Armament: 3 × GAM-B01 20 mm; 2 × 12.7 mm machine guns
- Aircraft carried: 1 helicopter
- Aviation facilities: 1 telescopic hangar

IRIS Bandar Abbas (Persian: بندرعباس) is the lead ship of the Bandar Abbas class that are used as fleet supply ships and are operated by the Islamic Republic of Iran Navy. It is named after the port city of Bandar Abbas, home to an important naval base of Iran Navy. The ship is operated as a combined tanker and store ship, which carries victuals, armaments, and general stores. The vessel does not have facilities for replenishment at sea (RAS).

== See also ==
- IRIS Bushehr
