= Bandar Abbas-class replenishment ship =

Class of two Iranian replenishment ships

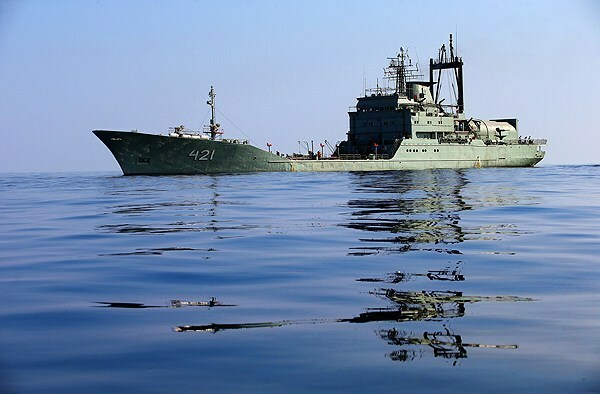

Class overview
- Builders: C. Lühring Yard, Brake, Lower Saxony, Germany
- Operators: Islamic Republic of Iran Navy
- Built: 1972–1974
- In service: 1974–present
- Completed: 2
- Active: 2

General characteristics
- Type: Fleet supply ship
- Tonnage: 3,237 GT; 3,302 DWT
- Displacement: 4,748 tons full load
- Length: 108 m (354 ft 4 in)
- Beam: 16.6 m (54 ft 6 in)
- Draught: 4.5 m (14 ft 9 in)
- Propulsion: 2 × MAN 6L 52/55 diesel engines, 12,060 hp (8.99 MW); 2 × shafts
- Speed: 20 knots (37 km/h; 23 mph)
- Range: 3,500 nmi (6,500 km; 4,000 mi) at 16 knots (30 km/h; 18 mph)
- Complement: 59
- Armament: 3 × GAM-B01 20 mm gun; 2 × 12.7 mm machine guns
- Aircraft carried: 1 helicopter
- Aviation facilities: 1 telescopic hangar

Bandar Abbas (Persian: بندرعباس) is a class that includes a pair of fleet supply ships operated by the Islamic Republic of Iran Navy.

== Ships in the class ==
Ship	Pennant number	Launched	Commissioned	Status
Bandar Abbas	421	11 or 14 August 1973	April 1974	In service
Bushehr	422	22 or 23 March 1974	November 1974	Interned by Sri Lanka on 5 March 2026

== See also ==
- 2026 surrender of IRIS Bushehr
