= Kangan-class ship =

Class of auxiliary water tanker

Class overview
- Builders: Mazagon Dock, Bombay, India
- Operators: Islamic Republic of Iran Navy
- Built: 1978–1979; 1991–1992
- In service: 1978–present
- Completed: 4
- Active: 2 (verified, at least)

General characteristics
- Type: Auxiliary water tanker
- Tonnage: 9,581 tons deadweight
- Displacement: 12,193 tons full load
- Length: 148 m (485 ft 7 in)
- Beam: 21.5 m (70 ft 6 in)
- Draught: 5 m (16 ft 5 in)
- Installed power: Diesel
- Propulsion: 1 × MAN 7L 52/55A engine, 7,385 horsepower (5.507 MW); 1 × shaft
- Speed: 15 knots (28 km/h; 17 mph)
- Capacity: 9,000 cubic metres (12,000 cu yd)
- Complement: 14
- Armament: 2 × USSR 23mm/80 (twin); 2 × 12.7mm machine guns

The Kangan (Persian: کنگان) is a class of auxiliary water tanker (AWT) operated by the Islamic Republic of Iran Navy. The class includes two pairs of ships built by the Mazagon Dock during 1978–1979 and 1991–1992.

== Ships in the class ==
Known ships in commission the class are:

| Ship | Namesake | Pennant number | Completed | Status |
|---|---|---|---|---|
| Kangan (7515250) | Bandar Kangan | 411 | 1978 | In service |
| Taheri (7515262) | Bandar Taheri | 412 | 1979 | In service |
| Shahid Marjani | Unknown | Unknown | 1991 | Unknown |
| Amir | Unknown | Unknown | 1992 | Unknown |

According to the Jane's Fighting Ships, it is unknown whether the second pair including Shahid Marjani and Amir are in naval service and the source comments that the two may be in civilian use. However, International Institute of Strategic Studies (IISS) reports indicate that all four are in military use.

== See also ==
- List of tankers
- List of naval ship classes of Iran
- List of naval ship classes in service
