= Kaivan-class patrol craft =

Iranian class of large patrol craft

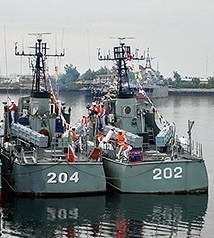

Class overview
- Builders: USCG, Curtis Bay
- Operators: Islamic Republic of Iran Navy
- In service: 1956–present
- Completed: 4
- Active: 3
- Lost: 1

General characteristics
- Type: Large patrol craft
- Displacement: 98/100 tons standard; 148/150 tons full load
- Length: 28.9 m (94 ft 10 in)
- Beam: 6.2 m (20 ft 4 in)
- Draught: 1.8–2 m (5.9–6.6 ft)
- Installed power: Diesel
- Propulsion: 2 or 4 × NYHMS-1200 engines, 2,120 horsepower (1.58 MW); 2 × shafts
- Speed: 15–21 kn (28–39 km/h)
- Range: 2,324 nmi (4,304 km) at 8 knots (15 km/h); 1,500 nmi (2,800 km) at 15 knots (28 km/h)
- Complement: 15

The Kaivan (Persian: کیوان) is a class of large patrol craft operated by the Islamic Republic of Iran Navy. The ships in this class are modified versions of the American Cape-class vessels, built by the United States Coast Guard Yard in the 1950s.

== Design ==
Sources cite displacement of Kaivan class vessels slightly different. According to Jane's Fighting Ships, the ships have a standard displacement of 100 tonnes (98 long tons) and 150 t (150 long tons) at full load. Conway's All the World's Fighting Ships puts the numbers at 98 tonnes (96 long tons) and 148 tonnes (146 long tons) for standard and full load displacements respectively. Combat Fleets of the World mentions only 85 tonnes (84 long tons). The class design is 28.9 m (95 ft) long, would have a beam of 6.2 m (20 ft) and a draft of 2 m (6 ft 7 in). The length is also recorded 29 m (95 ft).

== Ships in the class ==
The ships in the class are:

Ship	Pennant number	Commissioned	Status
IRIS Kaivan	201 (ex-61)	14 January 1956	In active service
IRIS Tiran	202 (ex-62)	1957	In active service
IRIS Mehran	203 (ex-63)	1959	Sunk in 1980 or 1981
IRIS Mahan	204 (ex-64)	1959	In active service
