= IRIS Taregh =

Iranian submarine

History

Iran
- Namesake: Tariq ibn Ziyad
- Operator: Islamic Republic of Iran Navy
- Ordered: 1988
- Builder: Admiralty Shipyard
- Cost: $375 million
- Laid down: 1988
- Launched: 25 September 1991
- Commissioned: 21 November 1992
- Refit: 2005, 2012
- Home port: Bandar Abbas
- Identification: 901
- Status: Sunk

General characteristics
- Class & type: Kilo-class submarine
- Displacement: 2,356 tons surfaced, 3,076 tons submerged
- Length: 72.6 m (238 ft 2 in)
- Beam: 9.9 m (32 ft 6 in)
- Draft: 6.6 m (21 ft 8 in)
- Installed power: Diesel-electric
- Propulsion: 2 × 3,650 horsepower (2.72 MW) Generators; 1 × 5,500 horsepower (4.1 MW) Propulsion motor; 1 × 130 horsepower (97 kW) Economic speed motor; 2 × 204 horsepower (152 kW) Auxiliary propulsion motor; 1 × Shaft; 2 × Diesels
- Speed: Surfaced; 10 knots (19 km/h); Snorkel mode; 9 knots (17 km/h); Submerged; 17 knots (31 km/h)
- Range: Snorkel mode; 6,000 mi (9,700 km) at 7 kn (13 km/h); Submerged; 400 mi (640 km) at 3 kn (5.6 km/h)
- Test depth: Normally 240 m (790 ft)
- Complement: 53 (12 officers)
- Armament: 18 torpedoes; 24 mines in lieu of torpedo tube; Cruise missiles

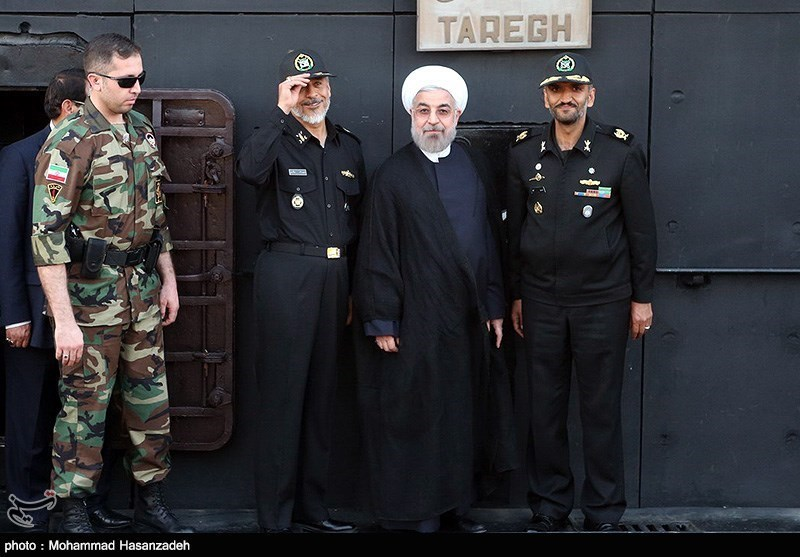

IRIS Taregh or Tareq (Persian: زیردریایی طارق) was the first Kilo-class attack submarine of Islamic Republic of Iran Navy, serving in the Southern Fleet. The submarine was part of the 33rd Flotilla, along with two other vessels.

She was the first ever submarine commissioned by any country to serve in the Persian Gulf and the second Iranian-owned submarine after IIS Kousseh (SS 101).

== Construction and commissioning ==
The contract to build Taregh was signed in 1988. It was reportedly worth $750 million for two submarines, with an option for the third.

Her keel was laid down at Admiralty Shipyard in Saint Petersburg in the same year. She was launched in 1991 and was commissioned on 21 November 1992 at the naval base in Bandar Abbas. Taregh was transferred to Iran via sailing in the Baltic Sea by Russian crew, which began in October 1992.

She was named after a famous Muslim warrior.

== Service history ==
Shortly after acquisition of Taregh by Iran, American submarine USS Topeka (SSN-754) entered the Persian Gulf in order to monitor Taregh, while her declared mission was "routine maintenance".

According to Jane's, there is no proof that the submarine has ever returned to Russia for a refit. However, following negotiations for an upgrade, a refit began inside Iran in mid 2000s reportedly with the assistance of Rosoboronexport and Sevmash. Since then, Iran was able to refit Kilo-class submarines on its own.

Taregh fired electrically propelled torpedoes for the first time in December 2011, during a war-game named Velayat-90.

In May 2012, Iran announced that it had relaunched Taregh after an overhaul in which some 18,000 components, including radar-evading cover, engine parts, propellers and radars were replaced. In the ceremony to rejoin the service, Admiral Habibollah Sayyari said the Russians did not provide Iran with any "instructions on submarine's details and structure", adding that his men had to figure out everything themselves.

In September 2012, she was deployed in the Persian Gulf as a response to the naval drills led by the United States Navy's Fifth Fleet, before being fielded in Velayat-91 exercise for a test of her new armaments. The war-game lasted from December 2012 to January 2013 in the Arabian Sea.

In January 2015, Taregh left home on a mission to provide security for shipping lines sailing from northern parts of the Indian Ocean to the Strait of Malacca and then South China Sea. Almost a year later, the submarine took part in war-game Velayat-94, sailing as far afield as the Sea of Oman and northern Indian Ocean. In November 2016, General Ataollah Salehi declared that Taregh was ready for dispatch as far as the Atlantic Ocean.

Media reports indicated that as of February 2019, Iran has upgraded Taregh to fire submarine-launched cruise missiles.

As of 1 March 2026, it was confirmed confirmed that Taregh had been sunk in port during the 2026 Iran War.

== In popular culture ==
Taregh fights against American forces in Primary Target, a 2014 thriller war novel by Joe Weber.

== See also ==
- List of current ships of the Islamic Republic of Iran Navy
