= Peruvian Coast Guard =

Directorate General of Captaincies and Coast Guard of Peru Dirección General de Capitanías y Guardacostas del Perú
- Seal of Peruvian Coast Guard

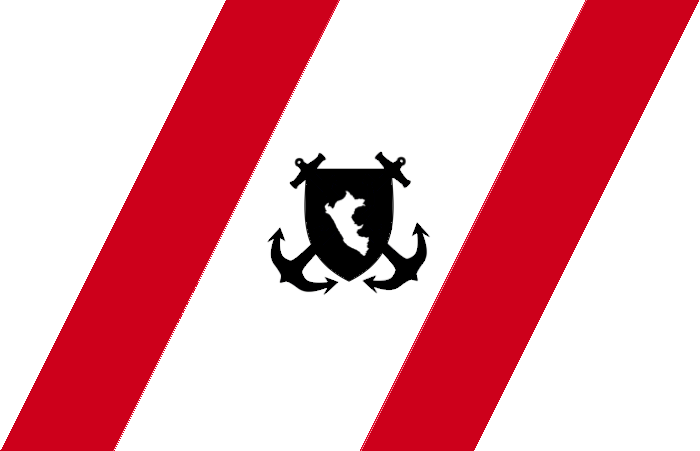
- Racing Stripe
- Abbreviation: DICAPI
- Motto: Securitas Dominatus Vigilantia

Agency overview
- Formed: 5 August 1919

Jurisdictional structure
- Operations jurisdiction: Peru
- Constituting instrument: Decree Law No. 17824 of 23 September 1969, the Captaincy and Coast Guard Corps
- Specialist jurisdiction: Coastal patrol, marine border protection, marine search and rescue

Operational structure
- Headquarters: Callao Naval Base
- Agency executives: Vice Admiral César Ernesto Colunge Pinto, Director General; Rear Admiral Pastor Ludwig Zanabria Acosta, Executive Director
- Parent agency: Peruvian Navy

Facilities
- Vessels: 3 patrol aircraft; 2 offshore patrol vessel; 12 coastal patrol ships; 16 port patrol boats; 13 harbour speedboats; 12 river patrol craft; 4 lake patrol boats; 1 lake hospital ship
- Aircraft: 2 Sikorsky SH-3 Sea King; 1 de Havilland Canada DHC-6 Twin Otter

Notables
- Anniversary: 5 August - Peruvian Maritime Authority's Day

Website
- www.dicapi.mil.pe

The Directorate General of Captaincies and Coast Guard of Peru (DICAPI, Spanish: Dirección General de Capitanías y Guardacostas del Perú) is the maritime authority and the Peruvian Coast Guard, the same one that carries out the control and surveillance work in maritime, fluvial and lacustrine environments, as well as search and rescue tasks. It is attached to the Navy of Peru, and according to law is empowered to exercise the maritime, fluvial and lacustrine police in order to apply and enforce the national regulations and international instruments of which Peru is a party, for ensure the protection and safety of human life in the aquatic environment, the protection of the aquatic environment and its resources, as well as repress illicit activities within its jurisdiction.

BAP Rio Nepeña (PC-243) and BAP Rio Tambo (PC-244) arriving to the Callao harbour after a patrol mission

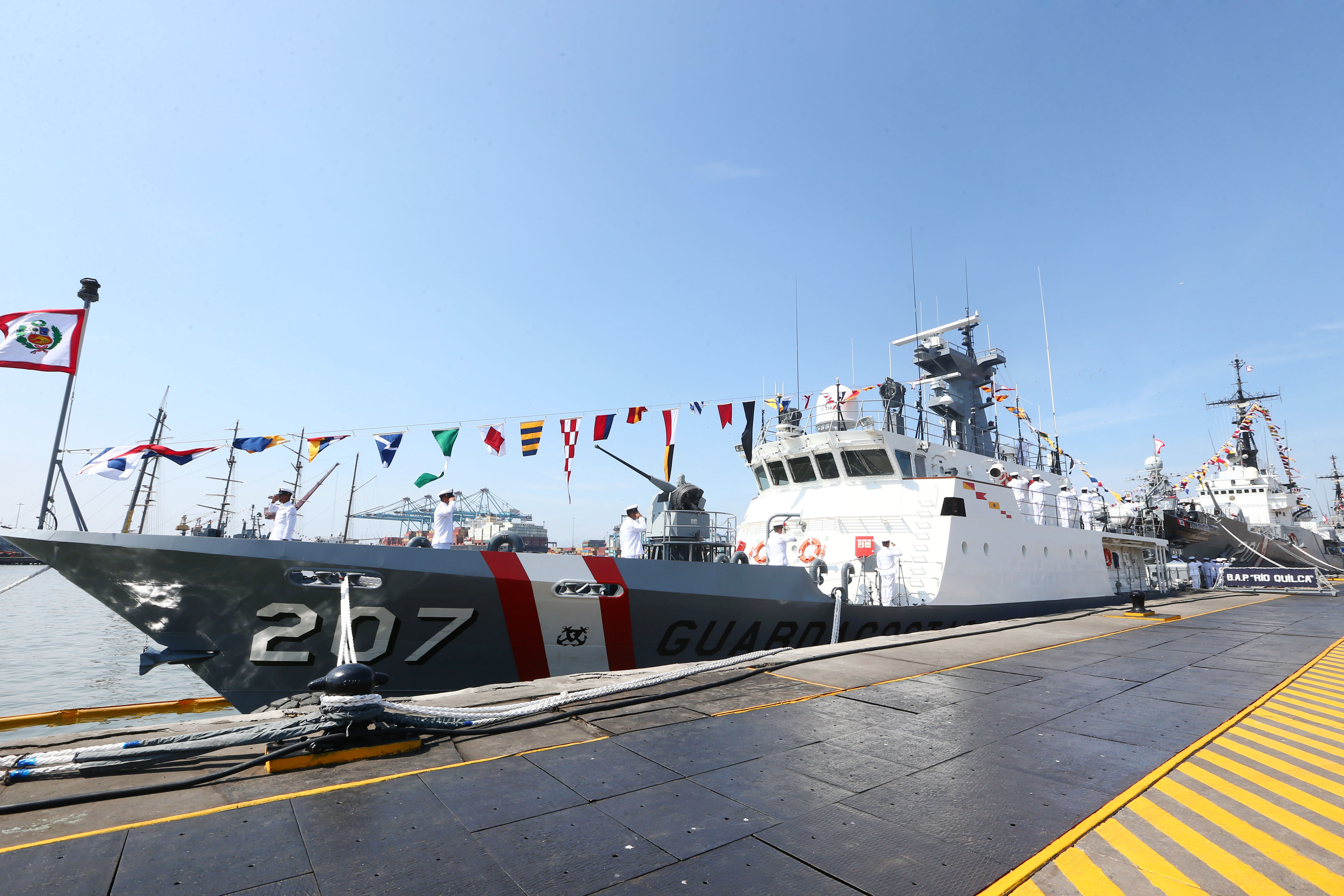
The launch of BAP Río Quilca (PM-207) in March 2017

== History ==
Maritime law enforcement activities dates back to the beginning of the 17th century, such activities is usually performed by sailors. By the end of 17th century, several port captaincies were formally established due to the urgent need to maintain order in the ports. Later on, the captaincy system is organized into Captaincy Directorate. Directorate General of Captaincies and Coast Guard was established on 5 August 1919 by Supreme Decree. Current captaincies and coast guard were created by Decree Law No. 17824 of 23 September 1969, the Captaincy and Coast Guard Corps.

As of April 2022, Vice Admiral César Ernesto Colunge Pinto serve as Director General of DICAPI and assisted by Rear Admiral Pastor Ludwig Zanabria Acosta as Director Executive of DICAPI.

== Equipment ==
Currently the Peruvian Coast Guard is composed by two offshore patrol ships, twelve coastal patrol ships, sixteen port patrol boats, and speedboats for bay control, river patrol boats, river speedboats, lake patrol boats, lake speedboats and motorboats for river interdiction, two Sea King helicopters for SAR operations, a Twin Otter hydroplane as well as a fleet of operational vehicles which strengthens operations by coast police of Coast Guard Captaincies.

Ship class	Rio Cañete	PGM 71	Rio Pativilca
Displacement	296 t	147 t	500 t
Dimensions	50.9 × 7.4 × 1.7 m	36.0 × 6.4 × 1.8 m	55.3 × 8.5 × 2.3 m
Propulsion	4 Bazan/MTU V8V 16/18 TLS diesels 5,640 shp (4,210 kW), 2 shafts	2 GM Detroit Diesel GN-71 diesels 1,450 shp (1,080 kW), 2 shafts	2 Caterpillar3516C HD diesels 3,345 shp (2,494 kW), 2 shafts
Speed	23 knots (43 km/h)	18 knots (33 km/h)	22 knots (41 km/h)
Range	3,050 nmi (6,000 km) at 17 knots (30 km/h)	1,500 nmi (3,000 km) at 10 knots (20 km/h)	3,600 nmi (7,000 km) at 14 knots (30 km/h)
Crew	39 (4 officers)	18 (4 officers)	25 (5 officer) + 14 Boarding Team
Armament	1 x 20mm Oerlikon Mk.10 AA gun 2 x 12.7mm machine guns	1 x 20mm Oerlikon Mk.10 AA gun 2 x 12.7mm machine guns	1 x 30 mm Typhoon; 2 x 12.7 mm MiniTyphoon machine guns
Equipment	1 Decca 1226 navigation radar VHF/UHF SATCOM transceiver	1 Raytheon navigation radar	1 Toplite EOS (Electro-Optical, Surveillance and reconnaisannce)

=== Ships ===
Vessel	Origin	Builder	Class	In service	Notes
Offshore patrol vessel (1 in service)
BAP Guardiamarina San Martin (PO-201)	Italy	Cantieri Navali Riuniti (CNR)	Lupo class	Yes	commissioned on December 26, 2013; ex-BAP Carvajal (FM-51) transferred from the Navy after being stripped down of its missile weaponry and main radar, reclassified as Patrullera Oceánica (Offshore patrol vessel)
Coastal patrol vessel (12 in service)
BAP Rio Pativilca (PM-204)	Peru	SIMA Chimbote	Rio Pativilca class	Yes	commissioned in 2016; (Offshore patrol vessel)
BAP Rio Cañete (PM-205)	Peru	SIMA Chimbote	Rio Pativilca class	Yes	commissioned in 2016; (Offshore patrol vessel)
BAP Rio Piura (PM-206)	Peru	SIMA Chimbote	Rio Pativilca class	Yes	commissioned in 2017; (Offshore patrol vessel)
BAP Rio Quilca (PM-207)	Peru	SIMA Chimbote	Rio Pativilca class	Yes	commissioned in 2017(Offshore patrol vessel)
BAP BAP Rio Tumbes (PM-208)	Peru	SIMA Chimbote	Rio Pativilca class	Yes	commissioned in 2020(Offshore patrol vessel)
BAP Rio Locumba (PM-209)	Peru	SIMA Chimbote	Rio Pativilca class	Yes	commissioned in 2020(Offshore patrol vessel)
BAP Río Chira (PC-223)	Peru	SIMA Callao	PGM 71 class	Yes	commissioned in June 1972; originally transferred from Navy to Coast Guard in 1975, then paid off in 1994, restored to service in 1997 after engines refurbished.
BAP Río Nepeña (PC-243)	Peru	SIMA Chimbote	Rio Cañete class	Yes	commissioned on December 1, 1981; refitted between 1996 and 1998
BAP Río Tambo (PC-244)	Peru	SIMA Chimbote	Rio Cañete class	Yes	commissioned in 1982; refitted between 1996 and 1998
BAP Río Ocoña (PC-245)	Peru	SIMA Chimbote	Rio Cañete class	Yes	commissioned in 1983; refitted in 1996
BAP Río Huarmey (PC-246)	Peru	SIMA Chimbote	Rio Cañete class	Yes	commissioned in 1984; refitted between 1996 and 1998
BAP Río Zaña (PC-247)	Peru	SIMA Chimbote	Rio Cañete class	Yes	commissioned on February 12, 1985; refitted between 1996 and 1998
Hospital ship (1 in service)
BAP Puno (ABH-306)	United Kingdom	James Watt Foundry, Birmingham	Yavarí class	Yes	commissioned in 1870; ex-Yapurá, now operates as a hospital ship

=== Decommissioned ships ===
Vessel	Origin	Builder	Class	Decommissioned	Notes
BAP Río Piura (PC-242)	Italy	Viareggio	Río Zarumilla class	2010	commissioned on September 5, 1960; refitted in 1996. sunk near Pisco on August 12, 2010

== Aircraft ==
Aircraft	Origin	Type	Version	In service	Notes
Helicopters
Sikorsky SH-3 Sea King	United States	SAR helicopter	UH-3H	2	six acquired from the US Foreign Military Sales program along with 12 GE T58-GE-40 engines for US$6 million. First two delivered in December, 2010, to be employed in the Makassar class LPDs, two for the Coast Guard, two in storage.
de Havilland Canada DHC-6 Twin Otter	Canada	seaplane	DHC-6-100	1	used for patrol and liaison duties in the Peruvian portion of the Amazon Basin

== Sources ==
- Peruvian Coast Guard Website
- Jane's Fighting Ships 2004-2005
