= List of ships attacked during the 2026 Iran war =

This article chronicles a list of ships attacked, damaged or sunk during the 2026 Iran war.

== Merchant ships ==
=== Unknown attacker ===
Name	Flag state	Ship type	Date	Location attacked	Casualties	Details	Ref.
Skylight	None (Note: It was flying the flag of Palau at the time of the attack, despite having been deregistered by the country.)	Oil/chemical tanker	1 March 2026	Oman: 5 nautical miles north of Khasab	2 dead, 4 injured	In December 2025, the U.S. Treasury sanctioned Skylight and other ships managed by Red Sea Ship Management as part of a "shadow fleet" to transport Iranian oil products. Because of this, Palau deregistered the ship in January.	
JV Innovation	Marshall Islands	Oil tanker	4 May 2026	Near Mina Saqr, Ras Al Khaimah, United Arab Emirates	None	Struck by unidentified munition, causing a minor fire on deck.	
Haji Ali	India	Dhow	13 May 2026	Off Omani coast	None	The dhow, on a voyage from Berbera, Somalia for Sharjah, United Arab Emirates, carrying livestock, was reported struck by a drone or missile. The ship caught fire and sank; the Indian crew of 14 were rescued by the Omani coast guard.	
Olympic Life	Marshall Islands	Oil tanker	26 May 2026	60 nautical miles off Muscat, Oman	None	The unladen vessel was damaged by a near-waterline external explosion, and rupture of a fuel tank led to some pollution. Olympic Life was able to continue its voyage.	
Unknown	Qatar	Vessel	27 June 2026	Off the coast of Qatar	1 killed, 1 injured	A Qatari citizen was killed after being struck by shrapnel from 'military operations' in the area. An Egyptian resident aboard the vessel was injured and transported to the hospital in stable condition.	

=== Merchant ships attacked by Iran ===
Name	Flag state	Ship type	Date	Location attacked	Casualties	Details	Ref.
Hercules Star	Gibraltar	Oil products tanker	1 March 2026	Oman: Near Ras Al-Khaimah	1 killed	The bunkering tanker sustained a confirmed projectile strike, forcing the vessel to retreat to a Dubai anchorage for safety.	
MKD Vyom	Marshall Islands	Oil tanker	1 March 2026	United Arab Emirates: 17 nautical miles northwest of Mina Saqr	1 killed (Note: an Indian national)	A projectile struck the vessel, sparking a fire that crews successfully extinguished.	
Ocean Electra	Liberia	Tanker	1 March 2026	United Arab Emirates: 35 nautical miles from Sharjah	None	Reuters listed a ship with an unknown name, cargo, and flag state, as being attacked on 1 March 2026. USNI News noted that MV Ocean Electra had a near miss on the same date and in the same location.	
Athe Nova	Honduras	Asphalt/bitumen tanker	1 March 2026	Strait of Hormuz	Unknown		
Stena Imperative	United States of America	Oil products tanker	2 March 2026	Bahrain	1 dead, 2 injured (Note: All casualties were among shipyard workers, not the crew)	The ship was struck around 2 a.m. AST, causing a fire which was successfully extinguished.	
Pelagia	Malta	Bulk carrier	2 March 2026	Oman: 137 nautical miles east of Muscat	None	Reuters and Argus Media listed a ship with an unknown name, cargo, and flag state, as being attacked on 2 March 2026.	
Gold Oak	Panama	Bulk carrier	3 March 2026	United Arab Emirates: 7 nautical miles east of Fujairah	Unknown	It was struck by an unknown projectile, sustaining minor damage.	
Libra Trader	Marshall Islands	Crude oil tanker	3 March 2026	United Arab Emirates: 10 nautical miles east of Fujairah	Unknown	Its funnel suffered minor damage after an explosion was heard.	
Unknown		Tanker	3 March 2026	Near the coast of Iraq	Unknown	Reuters listed a ship with an unknown name and flag state, as being attacked on 3 March 2026.	
MSC Grace	Liberia	Container ship	3 March 2026	United Arab Emirates: 20 nautical miles west of Dubai	None	A near miss occurred near the vessel, causing no damage.	
Safeen Prestige	Malta	Container ship	4 March 2026	Oman: 2 nautical miles off the coast in the Strait of Hormuz	Unknown	The vessel was initially struck above the waterline on 4 March 2026, setting fire to the engine room, and causing the crew to abandon ship. A new fire appeared on satellite imagery on 18 March 2026 as the vessel remained adrift. The circumstances of the renewed fire are unclear.	
Sonangol Namibe	Bahamas	Crude oil tanker	5 March 2026	Kuwait: 30 nautical miles southeast of Mubarak Al-Kabeer	None	While anchored without cargo, the vessel was approached by a small boat, before a blast broke the hull. According to Covert Shores, it was attacked by an unmanned surface vehicle.	
Mussafah 2	United Arab Emirates	Tug	6 March 2026	Strait of Hormuz	4 killed, 3 injured	The vessel was struck and sunk while attempting to aid the Safeen Prestige, which had been adrift for two days since being attacked.	
Louise P	Marshall Islands	Oil products tanker	7 March 2026	Near Al Jubail	Unknown		
Mayuree Naree	Thailand	Bulk carrier	10 March 2026	Oman	3 missing (Note: According to a Thai maritime official, 20 crewmembers managed to evacuate while three crewmembers were reported missing. They remained missing as of 31 March.)	Iran's IRGC Navy said it fired on the Mayuree Naree after the vessel ignored warnings not to traverse the Strait of Hormuz.	
One Majesty	Japan	Container ship	10 March 2026	United Arab Emirates: 50 nautical miles north of Dubai.	Unknown	Suffered minor damage from a projectile.	
Star Gwyneth	Marshall Islands	Bulk carrier	10 March 2026	Near the UAE	Unknown	According to the ship's owner Star Bulk Carriers, Star Gwyneth had limited hull damage when it “was hit by a projectile above the waterline”.	
Express Rome	Liberia	Container ship	10 March 2026	Near Ruus Al Jibal	Unknown	The IRGC said it fired on Express Rome after the vessel ignored warnings not to traverse the Strait of Hormuz. It was struck by multiple projectiles.	
Express Rome	Liberia	Container ship	30 March 2026	Saudi Arabia: 22 nautical miles northeast of Ras Tanura	None	Two near misses	
Unknown			10 March 2026	Iraq	Unknown	Reuters listed a ship with an unknown name, cargo, and flag state, as being attacked on 10 March 2026.	
Source Blessing	Liberia	Container ship	10 March 2026	Near Dubai	Unknown	Vessel impaced by an unknown projectile when ~35 miles north of Jebel Ali. All crew reported safe.	
Zefyros	Unknown	Oil products tanker	12 March 2026	Off the coast of Iraq	Unknown	According to Intelligencer, Zefyros and Safesea Vishnu were likely attacked by an unmanned surface vehicle off the coast of Iraq on 12 March.	
Safesea Vishnu	Marshall Islands	Oil products tanker	12 March 2026	Off the coast of Iraq	1 Indian killed	According to Intelligencer, Zefyros and Safesea Vishnu were likely attacked by an unmanned surface vehicle off the coast of Iraq on 12 March.	
Gas Al Ahmadiah	Kuwait	Oil products tanker	17 March 2026	United Arab Emirates: 23 nautical miles east of Fujairah	None	The vessel was struck by an unknown projectile, causing minor structural damage.	
Unknown			18 March 2026	United Arab Emirates: 11 nautical miles east of Khor Fakkan	1 missing	The vessel was struck by an unknown projectile, setting it on fire, which led to the crew abandoning ship.	
Halul 50	Qatar	Offshore vessel	18 March 2026	Qatar: 4 nautical miles east of Ras Laffan	None	UKMTO listed a ship with an unknown name, cargo, and flag state, as being hit by an unknown projectile on 18 March 2026. Seatrade Maritime News noted that Halul 50 was struck by falling debris as a result of Iranian strikes on Ras Laffan on the same date.	
Unknown			22 March 2026	United Arab Emirates: 15 nautical miles north of Sharjah	None		
Al Salmi	Kuwait	Oil products tanker	30 March 2026	United Arab Emirates: At the Port of Dubai	None	According to Al Jazeera, the ship was attacked by an "apparent Iranian drone."	
Haiphong Express (Note: Iranian state media incorrectly reported the vessel's name as Express Halfong.)	Singapore	Container ship	30 March 2026	Unclear (Note: According to the IRGC, the vessel was in central waters of the Persian Gulf. According to TRT World, it was near Al Salmi, placing it in the Port of Dubai.)	Unknown	The IRGC targeted the vessel due to ties to Israel, and claimed to strike it with a ballistic missile. According to TRT World, the vessel was at anchor near Al Salmi at the time of its attack.	
Epaminondas	Liberia	'Cargo ship'	22 April 2026	Strait of Hormuz	Unknown	Vessel seized by IRGC	
MSC-Francesca	Panama	'Cargo ship'	22 April 2026	Strait of Hormuz	Unknown	Vessel seized by IRGC	
Euphoria	Panama		22 April 2026	Strait of Hormuz	Unknown	Ship was stopped after being fired upon	
Safesea Neha	Marshall Islands	Bulk carrier	10 May 2026	Doha anchorage, Qatar	None	Struck by a drone; small fire extinguished	
Hui Chuan	Honduras	Floating armoury	14 May 2026	Gulf of Oman	Unknown	Seized by Iranian military forces and taken to Iran	
Al Rekayyat	Marshall Islands	LNG tanker	6 July 2026	Coast of Oman	None	Struck by drone; fire in engine room, ship continued	
Wedyan	Saudi Arabia	crude oil tanker	6 July 2026	'transiting the Strait of Hormuz'	None	Oil spill	
Cyprus Prosperity	Liberia	crude oil tanker	6 July 2026	'transiting the Strait of Hormuz'	Unknown		
GFS Galaxy	Cyprus	Container ship	12 July 2026	Strait of Hormuz	1 killed	Disabled by engine room damage; crew abandoned ship	

=== Iranian merchant ships captured by the United States ===
Name	Flag state	Ship type	Date	Location attacked	Casualties	Details	Ref.
Deep Sea	Iran	oil tanker	April 2026	Off Malaysia	Unknown		
Sevin	Iran	oil tanker	April 2026	Off Malaysia	Unknown		
Derya	Iran	oil tanker	April 2026	Off western India	Unknown		
Touska	Iran	Container ship	19 April 2026	Northern Arabian Sea	Unknown	Intercepted by USS Spruance (DDG-111) which, after warnings, fired several 5-inch rounds in the engine room to disable the ship; marines from the 31st Marine Expeditionary Unit later boarded and took control. 22 crew members were repatriated via Pakistan.	
Dorena	Iran	oil tanker	20 April 2026	Off southern India	Unknown		

=== Merchant ships attacked by the United States ===
Name	Flag state	Video	Ship type	Date	Location attacked	Casualties	Details	Ref.
Hasna	Iran		Oil tanker	6 May 2026	Off Bandar-e Jask, Iran	Unknown	An F/A-18 Super Hornet from USS Abraham Lincoln (CVN 72) fired into ship's rudder with its 20mm cannon.	
Sevda	Iran		Oil tanker	8 May 2026	Off Bandar-e Jask, Iran	Unknown	An F/A-18 Super Hornet from USS George H.W. Bush (CVN 77) struck the funnels of the Sevda and the Sea Star III with precision munition. By 9 May, the Sevda was on fire.	
Sea Star III	Iran		Oil tanker	8 May 2026	Off Bandar-e Jask, Iran	Unknown	An F/A-18 Super Hornet from USS George H.W. Bush (CVN 77) struck the funnels of the Sevda and the Sea Star III with precision munition. By 9 May, the Sevda was on fire.	
Lian Star	The Gambia		Cargo ship	29 May 2026	Gulf of Oman	Unknown	USCENTCOM reported that Lian Star was "transiting international waters toward an Iranian port on the Gulf of Oman", and after "more than 20 warnings while informing the vessel it was in violation of the U.S. blockade", U.S. aircraft fired a "Hellfire missile into the ship’s engine room", which "disabled" the ship.	
Lexie	Botswana (false)		Oil tanker	2 June 2026	Gulf of Oman	Unknown	USCENTCOM reported that the unladen oil tanker Lexie was "transiting international waters toward Kharg Island", and after "repeated warnings [...] multiple times over a 24-hour period.", "U.S. aircraft ultimately disabled the vessel by firing a Hellfire missile into the ship’s engine room, preventing the tanker from reaching Iran".	
Marivex	Madagascar (false)		Oil tanker	8 June 2026	Gulf of Oman	None	USCENTCOM reported that the unladen oil tanker Marivex was "transiting international waters toward Iran", and "an F/A-18 Super Hornet from USS Abraham Lincoln (CVN-72) fired a precision munition into the ship's engineering and steering spaces". The explosion caused a fire which prevented evacuation by lifeboat; the all-Indian crew of 24 were rescued by Omani military helicopter. The last official registration, in Palau, was closed in February 2026.	
Jalveer	Guinea-Bissau		Oil tanker	10 June 2026	Gulf of Oman	None	USCENTCOM reported that Jalveer was "transporting oil from Iran".	
Settebello	Palau		Oil tanker	10 June 2026	Gulf of Oman	3 dead	The US military attacked the Palau-flagged oil tanker MT Settebello on 9 June 2026 in the Gulf of Oman after accusing it of breaching the blockade by transporting Iranian oil; three Indian sailors (Aditya Sharma, Shivanand Chaurasiya, and Patnala Suresh) were confirmed dead after initially being reported missing, while 21 of the 24 Indian crew members were rescued. The IMO Secretary-General strongly condemned the attack, calling the targeting of seafarers "simply unacceptable".	
MT Kylo	COM			6 September 2026			The US military attacked the Comoros-flagged oil tanker MT Riesco on 5 September 2026 in the Gulf of Oman in response to Iranian attacks on a U.S. Navy ships. Kylo sank the next day.	
MT Riesco	ZWE			8 September 2026			The US military attacked the Zimbabwe-flagged oil tanker MT Riesco on 8 September 2026 in the Gulf of Oman in response to an Iranian attack on a U.S. Navy warship. Riesco sank.	

== Naval vessels attacked by Iran ==
Name	Flag state	Ship type	Date	Location attacked	Casualties	Details	Ref.
Kuwaiti Navy vessel	Kuwait	Vessel	14 July 2026	Persian Gulf	4 Kuwaiti soldiers injured	Iran struck a Kuwaiti navy vessel, injuring 4 Kuwaiti armed forces personnel	
U.S.-contracted vessel	United States	Vessel	14 September 2026	Strait of Hormuz	8 American soldiers injured	Iran struck a vessel, injuring 8 US Navy Marines.	

== Iranian naval vessels ==
The following are ships in the Islamic Republic of Iran Navy and Islamic Revolutionary Guard Corps Navy that have been attacked during the war.

=== Damaged ===
Name	Image	Class	Date	Location attacked	Casualties	Details	Ref.
IRIS Shahid Sayyad Shirazi		Shahid Soleimani-class warship	4 March 2026		Unknown	Attacked by the United States, the warship was reported burning at sea with fire and smoke seen emanating from its hull, yet despite its considerable sustained damage, it remained afloat.	
IRIS Shahid Bagheri		Drone carrier converted from a container ship	28 February-6 March 2026		Unknown	Claimed to have been struck by CENTCOM, and the maritime security company Vanguard.	
IRIS Abu Mahdi al-Muhandis		Missile corvette				CENTCOM said the ship was struck at port and not armed with anti-ship missiles at the time.	

=== Iranian ships claimed/suspected to be sunk ===
Name	Image	Class	Date	Location attacked	Casualties	Details	Ref.
IRIS Zagros		Moudge-class frigate			Unknown		
Unknown		Kilo-class submarine	2–4 March 2026	Iran: Bandar Abbas Naval Harbor, Hormozgan Province	Unknown	The Telegraph has listed a Kilo-class submarine with an unknown name as being suspected to have been sunk, while based on satellite imagery, The Maritime Executive has stated that "in the imagery from 4 March, there is smoke damage but no sign of a submarine or something sunken at the berth where a Kilo Class boat is normally berthed." Centcom stated that "CENTCOM highlighted strikes on midget subs and Kilo-class boats, with the most operational submarine now holed and disabled."	
Unknown		Ghadir-class submarine			Unknown	The Telegraph has listed a Ghadir-class submarine with an unknown name as being suspected to have been sunk. A U.S. official told TWZ it was struck with an AGM-114 Hellfire missile. Centcom stated that "highlighted strikes on midget subs and Kilo-class boats, with the most operational submarine now holed and disabled."	

=== Iranian ships sunk ===
Name	Image	Class	Date	Location attacked	Casualties	Details	Ref.
IRIS Bayandor		Bayandor-class corvette	28 February 2026	Iran: Artesh Navy 3rd Naval District base, Konarak, Hormozgan Province	Unknown	Listed sunk by The Telegraph, BBC Verify, and the Maritime security firm Vanguard. The two ships were destroyed together.	
IRIS Naghdi		Bayandor-class corvette	28 February 2026	Iran: Artesh Navy 3rd Naval District base, Konarak, Hormozgan Province	Unknown	Listed sunk by The Telegraph, BBC Verify, and the Maritime security firm Vanguard. The two ships were destroyed together.	
IRIS Jamaran		Moudge-class frigate	28 February or 1 March 2026	Iran: Near the IRGC Navy Imam Ali Base in Chabahar, Sistan and Baluchestan province	Unknown	Sunk by the United States while in port at Chabahar. In September 2022, IRIS Jamaran seized two US unmanned surface vessels.	
IRIS Dena		Moudge-class frigate	4 March 2026	International waters 19 nautical miles south of Galle, Sri Lanka, within its exclusive economic zone	104 killed, 32 wounded	Main article: Sinking of IRIS Dena Torpedoed by US Navy submarine USS Charlotte. It was the first instance of a US submarine sinking an enemy surface vessel since World War II.	
IRIS Sahand		Alvand-class frigate			Unknown		
IRIS Sabalan		Alvand-class frigate			Unknown		
IRIS Alborz		Alvand-class frigate	12 May 2026	Dry dock	Unknown	As of 12 May 2026, high res satellite confirms it was destroyed in dry dock.	
IRIS Makran		Forward base ship converted from a crude oil tanker	1 March 2026	Bandar Abbas naval base	Unknown	Destroyed by US forces while in port at Bandar Abbas naval base.	
