= Moudge =

Moudge might refer to:

- Moudge-class frigate, an Iranian frigate class. The Iranian calls it a destroyer class but size indicates it is a frigate.
- Moudge I, the first ship of the Moudge class. This is the first large warship built in Iran. Also known as Iranian frigate Jamaran.
- Moudge II, the second ship of the Moudge class. Also known as Iranian frigate Damavand.
- موج, The Persian word for Wave
