= Makran-class forward base ship =

Cargo ship of the Iranian Navy

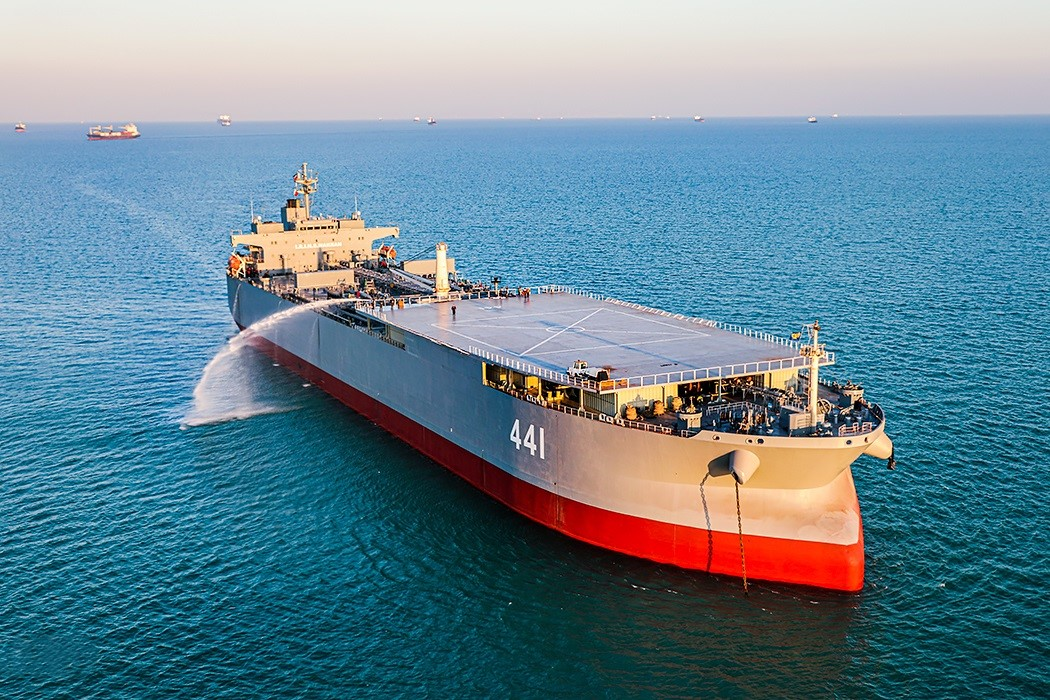

Class overview
- Operators: Islamic Republic of Iran Navy
- Building: 1
- Completed: 2
- Active: 1
- Lost: 1

General characteristics (after modification)
- Type: Forward Base Ship
- Displacement: 121,000 metric tons full load
- Length: 230.13 m (755 ft 0 in)
- Beam: 42.03 m (137 ft 11 in)
- Height: 21.5 m (70 ft 6 in)
- Endurance: 1,000 days
- Aircraft carried: 6-7 helicopters
- Aviation facilities: Helipad

IRIS Makran (Persian: مکران) was the lead forward base ship of the Islamic Republic of Iran Navy. Ships of this class have been in service with Iran's Southern Fleet since 2021 and are named after the coastal region of Makran.

Makran was a former crude oil tanker converted into a warship, she was known with the tentative title Khalij-e Fars (lit. 'Persian Gulf', a name reserved for the lead ship of Project Loghman) before her name being changed to the current. Though not officially acknowledged, TankerTrackers, a firm that tracks maritime traffic, has identified her as a Japanese-built ship completed in 2010, previously named Beta and earlier Al Buhaira, and whose AIS signal was last detected in 2019 near United Arab Emirates. Its intended task/purpose is to support naval units in remote waters, especially in the North Indian Ocean, the Bab-el-Mandeb and the Red Sea. Like Makran the other two ships are also being converted from oil tanker to forward base ship.

== Construction and design ==
The first ship was launched on 10 September 2009 at the Sumitomo Heavy Industries, Ltd. shipyard in Yokosuka, Kanagawa, Japan. She was completed on 8 March 2010. According to a report by Bloomberg, FAL Oil Co., a UAE-based energy trader, took a loan worth $62.4 million from German DVB Bank in July 2010, in order to refinance the construction of the Al Buhaira and another tanker.

=== Original characteristics ===
Al Buhaira was an Aframax-rated tanker capable of transporting about 80,000–100,000 metric tons (79,000–98,000 long tons; 88,000–110,000 short tons) of oil. Her recorded length overall was 229.6 m (753 ft 3 in), and she was 217.8 m (714 ft 7 in) long between perpendiculars, with a beam of 42.0 m (137 ft 10 in). The ship had a capacity of 105,319 tonnes deadweight (DWT), while her gross tonnage (GT) was 55,909.

=== Conversion ===
According to H. I. Sutton, satellite imagery shows that the conversion took place at ISOICO shipyard in Bandar Abbas, where she was "rebuilt with hangar-like sheds on the deck" and painted blue-gray to be subsequently floated in November 2020, before going on sea trials between 9 and 14 December 2020. Iranian media stated that Makran displaces 121,000 metric tons (119,000 long tons; 133,000 short tons), and put her dimensions at 228 m (748 ft) long, 42 m (137 ft 10 in) wide and 21.5 m (70 ft 6 in) tall. It was suspected she was launched in late 2020 after being refitted as a sea base and underwent sea trials in December of the same year. The ship is equipped with information collection and processing gear.

== Operational capabilities ==
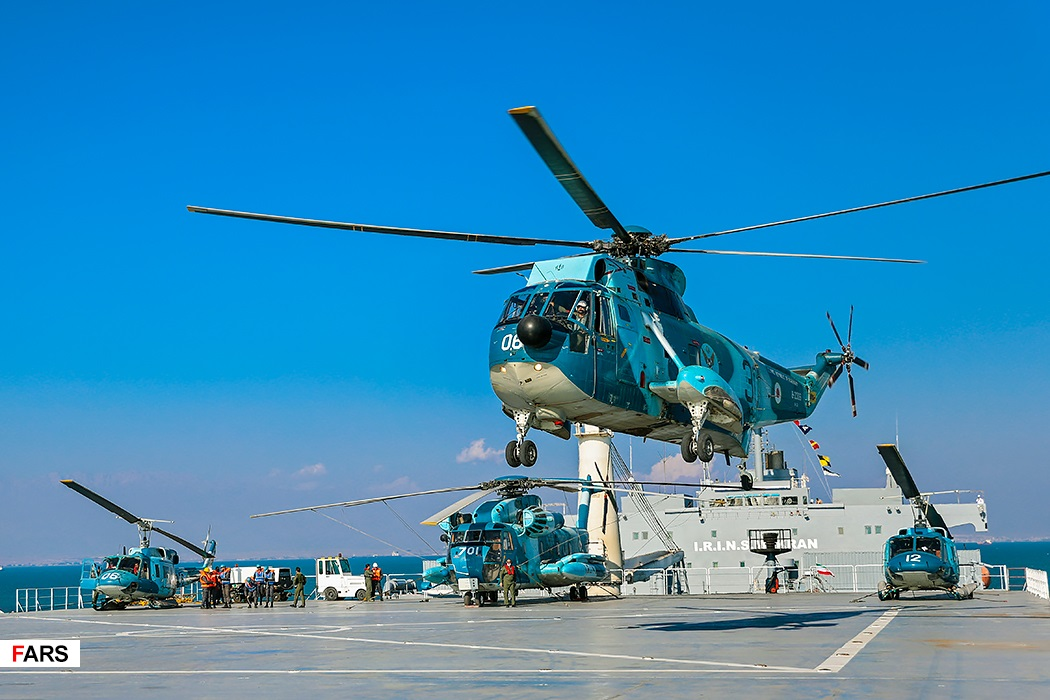
Helicopters landing at Makran's deck

Makran's exact capabilities are unclear. While the ship is generally similar to the American Expeditionary Mobile Base (EMB) vessels, it lacks the utility deck used for loading and unloading of stores and thus is believed to have a lower operational flexibility in comparison to the EMBs.

Makran can sail almost three years without docking. According to Thomas Newdick, the ship provides the navy with "persistent maritime operations in and outside of the country's own littoral areas" and can "serve as a platform for more directly challenging Iran's regional opponents, including Saudi Arabia".

She may act as a mother ship for special operations or asymmetric operations, being used to launch speedboats, deliver or retrieve combat divers and commandos, or use of limpet mines.

Her helicopter deck can embark as many as seven helicopters, while platforms for launching VTOL unmanned aerial vehicles are also available. The space on the deck is large enough to accommodate weapon systems such as fixed/mobile missile launchers or large-caliber rocket artillery and their radars systems. Though surface-to-air missile systems may also be installed, Makran apparently lacks air defense which is considered a major disadvantage.

== Service history ==
=== Commercial service ===
For a flag of convenience, she flew a Liberian flag during her entire career as a tanker, her registered port being Monrovia. The registered owner of Al Buhaira was Al Buhaira International Shipping Inc, a company based in Dubai. Later she was owned by Ionian Shipping Management LLC, another Emirati company in Fujairah.

On 4 March 2013, Somali pirates unsuccessfully attempted to hijack her while she was sailing in the Arabian Sea in the international waters in the vicinity of Mukalla. According to a report by International Maritime Organization, "[f]our skiffs with around six persons in each skiff approached the tanker from her port bow, mid-ships and astern. A ladder and an RPG were sighted in the approaching skiffs", subsequently the master "raised the alarm, took anti-piracy measures, informed UKMTO and all non-essential crew retreated to the citadel. Onboard armed security team fired warning shots resulting in the skiffs stopping the approach at a distance of around four cables from the ship".

=== Military service ===
On 12 January 2021, the first ship of the class was officially commissioned into Iran Navy. A day later, she participated in a missile exercise in the Gulf of Oman that included carrying commandos to the ship.

In June 2021, Makran and the accompanying frigate IRIS Sahand were the first Iranian naval ships to reach the Atlantic without docking in an international port, according to official Iranian sources. Early media report incorrectly suggested they were bound for Venezuela, but the ships were bound for Saint Petersburg to attend Navy Day to commemorate the 325th anniversary of the Russian Navy foundation. Makran was reported to be carrying several fast attack craft.

== Ships in the class ==
Known ship in commission in the class is Makran with Khuzestan and Kurdistan are under construction/conversion at ISOICO Shipyard. Also like Makran, both under construction ships are named after Khuzestan and Kurdistan, the two namesake regions of Iran. Details of origins of the two ships named Khuzestan and Kurdistan are still unknown.

=== Forward base ships ===
Class	Name	Laid down	Launched	Displacement	Builder	Estimated commission	Fleet	Notes
Makran class	IRIS Makran				ISOICO Shipyard	2021	Southern Fleet	Destroyed in the 2026 Iran war.
Makran class	IRIS Kordistan				ISOICO Shipyard	2025	Southern Fleet	Converted from oil tanker. Struck by the US forces on 2 March 2026.
Makran class	IRIS Khuzestan				ISOICO Shipyard	2024-2025	Southern Fleet	In process of conversion from oil tanker, similar design to Makran

== See also ==
- IRIS Shahid Roudaki, a naval vessel with similar role in the other naval service of Iran (IRGNC)
- List of current ships of the Islamic Republic of Iran Navy
- 360-Degree mission of Iran's 86th Naval Fleet
