= IRIS Deylaman =

Iranian-made Moudge-class frigate

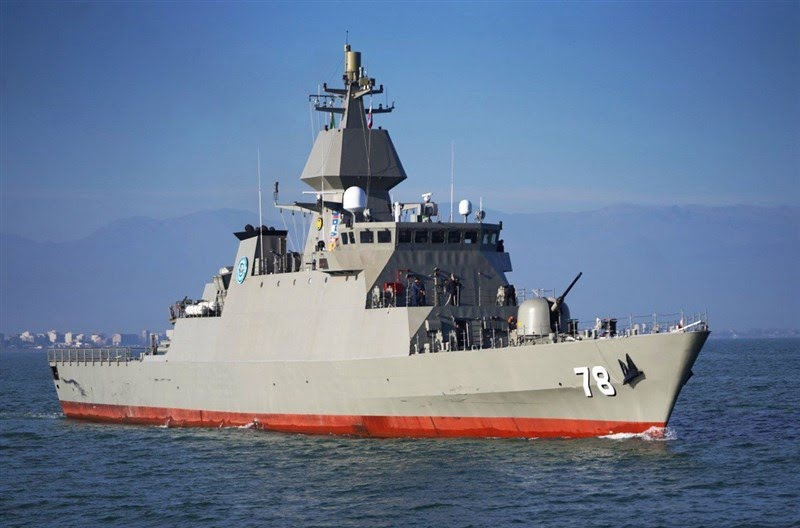

History

Iran
- Name: Deylaman
- Namesake: Deylaman
- Builder: Iranian Navy's Factories
- Home port: Bandar-Anzali
- Identification: Pennant number: 78; Code letters: EQAH
- Status: Sunk

General characteristics
- Class & type: Moudge-class frigate
- Type: Frigate
- Displacement: 1,200-1,500 tons
- Length: 95 m (312 ft)
- Speed: 30 knots
- Crew: 80 + 64 (64 special forces)
- Armament: 1 × 76 mm DP rapid fire auto-cannon; 8 × Anti-ship missile Qader / Ghadir; 2 × 20 mm Oerlikon autocannons; 1 × 30 or 40 mm autocannon; 1 × Kamand CIWS; 2 × 12.7 heavy machine guns (HMG); 2 × triple 324 mm light torpedoes; 4 × Mehrab/Sayyad-3 SAMs
- Aviation facilities: helipad

IRIS Deylaman (78) (Persian: دیلمان) was a Moudge-class frigate that joined the Iranian Northern Fleet in the Caspian Sea in November 2023.

It was the replacement for the frigate Damavand, that was sunk in 2018 after a heavy storm in Bandar Anzali.

== Background ==
Deylaman is a 1,500-ton vessel that was designed, manufactured and classified in Iran as a destroyer. The warship is armed with eight anti-ship missiles which are duplicated in comparison by its older sisters and equipped with an all-round home made radar, the Eagle eye phased array antenna.

Deylaman is the fifth frigate of Moudge class. The vessel began its service on 27 November at Anzali port on the Caspian Sea with Iranian Navy.

The vessel was struck by the Israeli Air Force in March 2026, utilizing multiple guided munitions during the 2026 Iran war.
