= IRIS Zagros =

Iranian signals intelligence ship

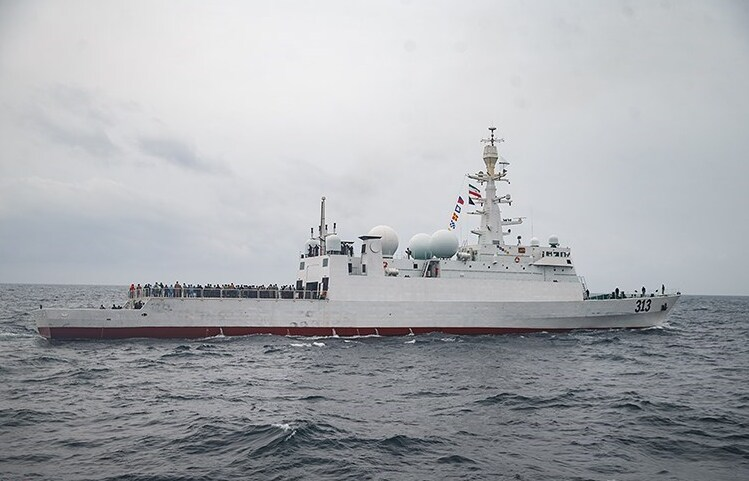

History

Iran
- Name: Zagros
- Builder: Iranian Navy's Factories, Bandar Abbas
- Laid down: 2025
- Launched: 2025
- Commissioned: 2025
- In service: 2025–2026
- Home port: Bandar Abbas
- Identification: Pennant number: 313
- Status: Suspected sunk

IRIS Zagros (Farsi: ناو زاگرس) was a Moudge-class information-signal frigate built by the Iranian Navy, the Ministry of Defense's naval industries, and knowledge-based companies and unveiled in 2025.

== History ==
It was delivered to the Iranian Navy on January 15, 2025, in the presence of the Chief of Staff of the Armed Forces, Mohammad Bagheri, and the Commander-in-Chief of the Army, Seyyed Abdolrahim Mousavi. Also present at the ceremony were the Minister of Defense and Support of the Armed Forces, Aziz Nasirzadeh, the Commander of the Navy, Shahram Irani, and other officials of the Armed Forces. The purpose of its production and use is to increase the combat-information capability of the Iranian Navy and to further dominate this force over distant waters.

Among the most important operational features of this vessel are the presence of electronic sensors, an advanced integrated mast with precise calculation of the effects of electromagnetic waves, the ability to intercept active and passive, cyber operations, and intelligent monitoring. This frigate has a dedicated helicopter pad. This capability is very efficient for long-term operations. In other Moj-class ships, the helicopter pad is located at the end of the ship and is not able to accommodate a helicopter for a long time due to weight limitations. However, in Zagros, the helicopter pad has been moved forward from the heel of the ship and the hangar is located in the middle of the ship. The importance of the hangar is in protecting the helicopter from the stresses in the marine environment, as well as technical support, helicopter maintenance and refueling. "Other features of this new vessel of the modernized Iranian Navy include agility, maneuverability and high speed. This ship provides the Navy with the ability to carry out extensive and more valuable operational missions; the ability to carry out maritime search and rescue operations and navigation in adverse sea conditions are also other capabilities of Zagros.

As of 3 March 2026, The Telegraph newspaper reported that Zagros was "suspected sunk" during 2026 Iran war.

== See also ==
- IRIS Jamaran
- IRIS Deylaman
- IRIS Sahand
- IRIS Dena
