= Project Loghman =

Iranian warship class

Khalij-e Fars class destroyer
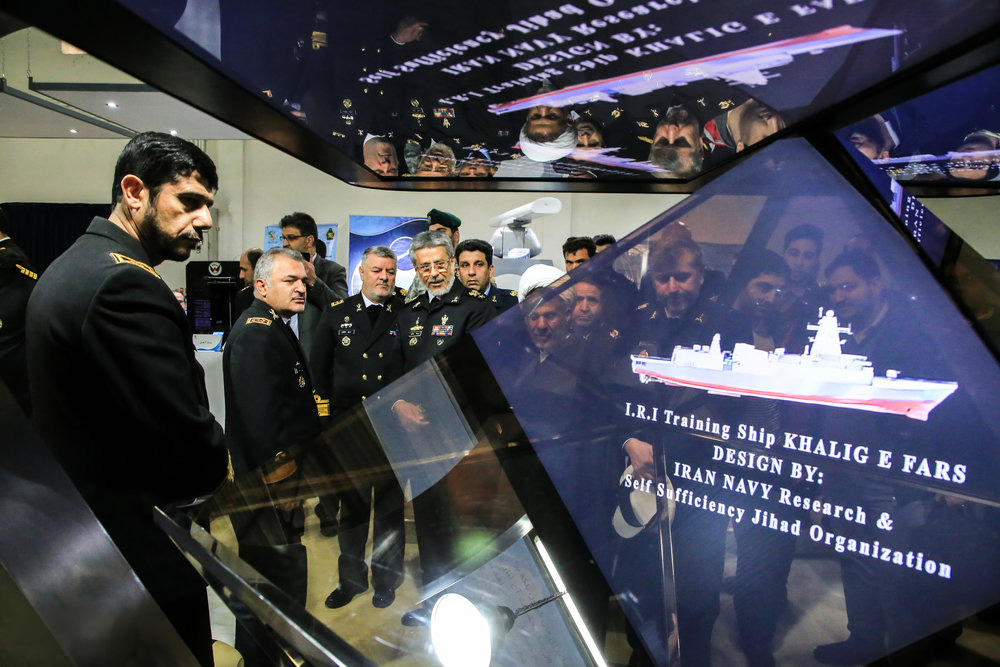

Class overview
- Name: Khalij-e Fars-class destroyer
- Builders: Iranian Navy's Factories
- Operators: Islamic Republic of Iran Navy
- Built: 2019–present
- Building: 1

General characteristics
- Type: Destroyer
- Displacement: 7,500 t (full)
- Length: 154 m (505 ft 3 in)
- Draft: 5 m (16 ft 5 in)
- Speed: 30 knots (56 km/h; 35 mph)
- Range: 8,000 nautical miles (15,000 km; 9,200 mi)
- Complement: 180
- Sensors & processing systems: Asr Radar and another Radar systems
- Armament: missiles, torpedoes, modern naval cannons; 1 × 76 mm (3 in) DP rapid fire auto-cannon; 2 × CIWS (Iranian made); 8 × Qader anti-ship missiles; 8 × Sayad defense missile 3; 2 × crew served 20 mm Oerlikon cannons; 2 × Anti-torpedo system
- Aircraft carried: 1 Security SH-3
- Aviation facilities: Enclosed hangar

The Khalij-e Fars class (literally: Persian Gulf) is a destroyer class, the class was previously designated a training ship. In terms of size and armament the vessel is the first true destroyer built by Iran.

Many experts believe that it was referred to as a training vessel in order to cover the real goal of the vessel. The class is five times larger than the Jamaran, which means it is at least 5,500 tons and 7,000-7,500 tons full. A model which appeared in November 2014 shows a radar above the destroyer.

Construction began on November 11, 2019.

== Specifications ==
The Loghman Project (Persian Gulf Training Ship) is a training ship that weighs 5,000 tons, is 135 meters long, 16 meters wide, and has a draft of 4.7 meters, and is capable of sailing 8,000 nautical miles.

== Khalij-e Fars ==
Khalij-e Fars is the lead ship of Project Loghman and an upcoming training ship/destroyer of the Islamic Republic of Iran Navy currently under construction.

== See also ==
- Iranian destroyer Persian Gulf
