= Kylo =

Kylo may refer to:

== People ==
- Kylo-Patrick Hart, a department chair at the Texas Christian University
- Kylo Jones, a player for the Western Michigan Broncos men's basketball team
- Kylo Evergreen Maris, the son of Bill Maris
- Kylo Turner, a former singer for the Pilgrim Travelers

=== Fictional characters ===
- Prince Kylo, a character in the Doctor Who universe
- Kylo Ren, the main antagonist of the sequel trilogy of the Star Wars universe

== Radio ==
- KYLO, the first callsign used by the California radio station KXSE
- KYLO-LP, a Catholic radio station also in California

== Technology ==
- An alternate spelling of the Russian Kilo-class submarine
- MT Kylo, a large oil tanker ship sunk during the 2026 Iran war
- Kylo (web browser), an open source web browser

== Other ==
- Kyloe, a civil parish in the county of Northumberland, England
- Kylo (given name)
