= IRIS Paykan (2003) =

Iranian Sina-class fast attack craft

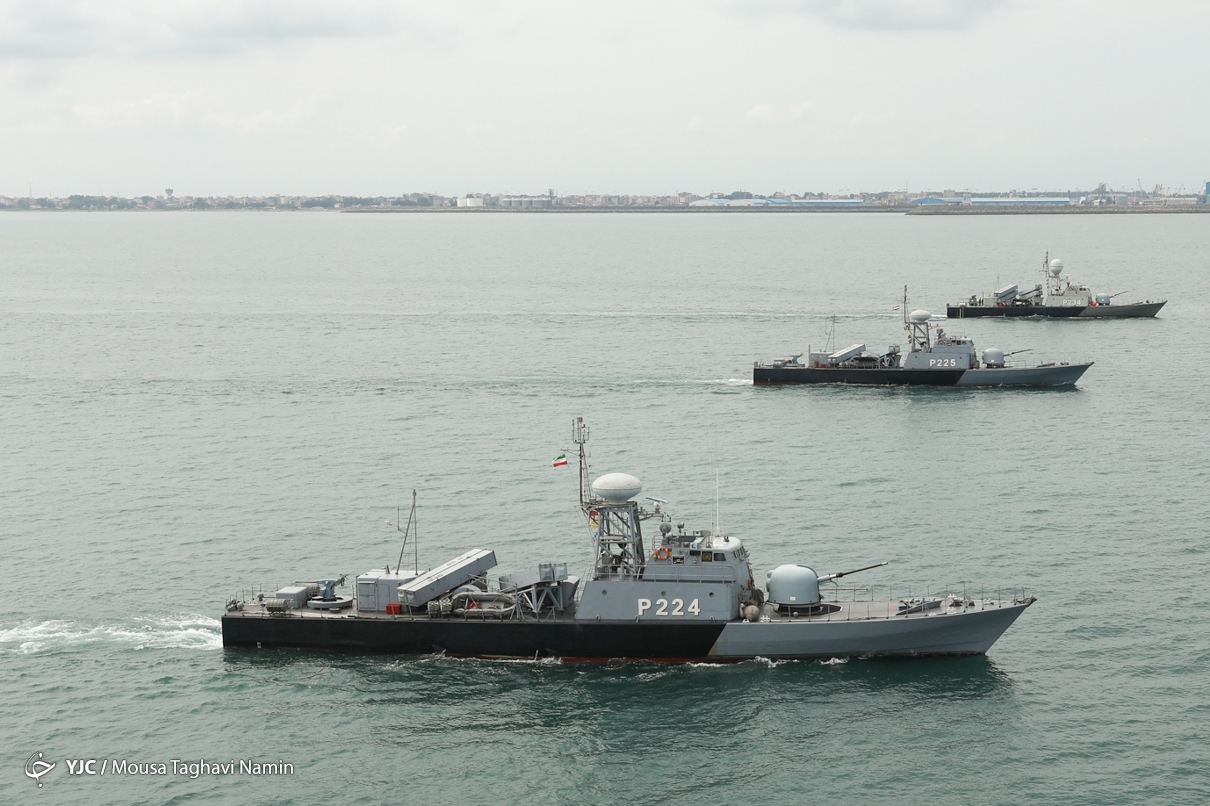

History

Iran
- Name: Paykan
- Builder: Iran
- In service: 29 September 2003
- Identification: Hull symbol: P224; Code letters: EQMW
- Status: Destroyed

General characteristics
- Class & type: Sina-class fast attack craft
- Displacement: 275 tons full load
- Length: 47 m (154 ft 2 in)
- Beam: 7.1 m (23 ft 4 in)
- Draught: 2 m (6 ft 7 in)
- Propulsion: 4 diesels, 4 shafts, 14,400 bhp (10,700 kW)
- Speed: 36 knots (67 km/h; 41 mph)
- Complement: 31
- Armament: (2) or (4) C-802 surface-to-surface missiles; (1) Fajr-27 76 mm DP (OTO Melara) gun; (1) 40 mm anti-aircraft gun

The Iranian missile boat Paykan (Persian: پيکان) was an Iranian-made Sina-class fast attack craft. The Sina class is nearly identical to the Kaman class and Paykan and Joshan are both often referred to as members of the Kaman class.

== Design ==
Paykan was Iran's first self-made missile boat and is equipped with two or four C802 SSM anti-ship missiles, one Fajr-27 76 mm dual-purpose gun and one 40 mm anti-aircraft gun.

Paykan was built in memory of the original Paykan, that sank three Iraqi Navy Osa II boats in 1980 during Operation Morvarid, it also has the same pennant number as the original one.

As of 18 March 2026, Paykan was confirmed destroyed.

== See also ==
- List of current ships of the Islamic Republic of Iran Navy
- List of military equipment manufactured in Iran
- 27 Rajab fast attack craft
