= Iranian ship Damavand =

At least two ships of the Iranian Navy have been named Damavand:

- Iranian destroyer Damavand, formerly the Battle-class destroyer HMS Sluys acquired in 1967 and named Artemiz. She was renamed in 1985 and stricken around 1996
- Iranian frigate Damavand, a Moudge-class frigate launched in 2013
