= IRIS Hamzeh =

Iranian navy corvette (1936–1979; 1998–)

- Hamzeh during naval exercises in 2015

History

Imperial State of Iran
- Name: Shahsavar
- Namesake: Shahsavar
- Ordered: 9 December 1935
- Builder: N.V. Boele's Scheepswerven & Machinefabriek, Bolnes
- Laid down: 18 January 1936
- Launched: 17 June 1936
- In service: 1936–1979
- Refit: 1956
- Home port: Bandar Pahlavi

Iran
- Name: Hamzeh
- Namesake: Hamza ibn Abdul-Muttalib
- Operator: Islamic Republic of Iran Navy
- Recommissioned: 1998
- Reclassified: Turned into warship
- Identification: Pennant number: 802 (ex-155); Code letters: EQNL
- Status: Sunk in March 2026 Bandar Anzali strike

General characteristics (as built)
- Type: Yacht
- Displacement: 530 tons
- Length: 53.7 m (176 ft 2 in)
- Beam: 7.7 m (25 ft 3 in)
- Draft: 3.2 m (10 ft 6 in)
- Installed power: 2 × Stork diesel engines, 1,300 brake horsepower (0.97 MW)
- Speed: 15 knots (28 km/h)

General characteristics (after reconstruction)
- Type: Corvette
- Sensors & processing systems: Active radar homing to 120 kilometres (65 nmi) at 0.9 Mach
- Armament: 4 × AShM launcher; 1 × 20mm main gun; 1 × 12.7mm machine gun

Hamzeh (Persian: حمزه) was a corvette serving in the Northern Fleet of the Islamic Republic of Iran Navy. She was originally named Shahsavar and was built for Reza Shah as the royal yacht of the Shah of Iran, amid a period of social and economic development. The ship was later converted into a warship, acquiring her current name. While nominally in operational condition, she was nonetheless largely relegated to light duties and ceremonial use.

On 18 March 2026, Hamzeh was destroyed while at her moorings during the 2026 Iran War, in a strike conducted by the Israeli Air Force.

== Design ==
Shahsavar was noted for its special design and was considered among the most luxurious yachts in the world.

The ship Shahsavar was 161 feet (49 m) long at the waterline, and 177 feet (54 m) overall. She had a beam of 25 feet 5 inches (7.75 m), and a depth of 16 feet 4 inches (4.98 m) while her draught was 10 feet 6 inches (3.20 m). She was equipped with two seven-cylinder two-stroke cycle single-acting diesel engines, provided by Gebr. Stork, of Hengelo. This system was designed to provide 1,300 brake horsepower (0.97 MW) for a top speed of 14 knots (26 km/h) at 340 r.p.m. Additionally, she was fitted with a hoist provided by The American Engineering Company.

The yacht was fitted out with a luxurious interior, equipped with facilities for the royal family, guests and the crew of twelve. The stern was reserved for the royal family and their entourage. This included rooms panelled with white oak, luxury furniture, bookcases, a study and a dresser. The yacht was equipped with hot and cold running water and central heating, as well as a wide fireplace equipped with a simulated electric fire, below a mounted portrait of "His Imperial Highness." Teak and marble were extensively incorporated into the interior.

== Construction ==
Construction began on 10 January 1935 at N.V. Boele's Scheepswerven & Machinefabriek Bolnes, with the first keel plate laid on 8 January 1936. Plating work was completed on 16 March, with the engines and electrical fitout complete by 20 May.

Shahsavar was christened and launched on 17 June 1936.

== Service history ==
=== The Shah's imperial yacht ===
Sea trials took place on 4 July 1936 on the Nieuwe Waterweg in the presence of the Dutch Ministry of Social Affairs and Employment, as well as two Iranian naval officers; Captain Zell and 1st Lieutenant Engineer Zad. Shortly after, the yacht was transported through the Baltic Sea to Leningrad by a tug operated by Smit International. Delivery in the summer season was important, to allow timely passage through Russia.

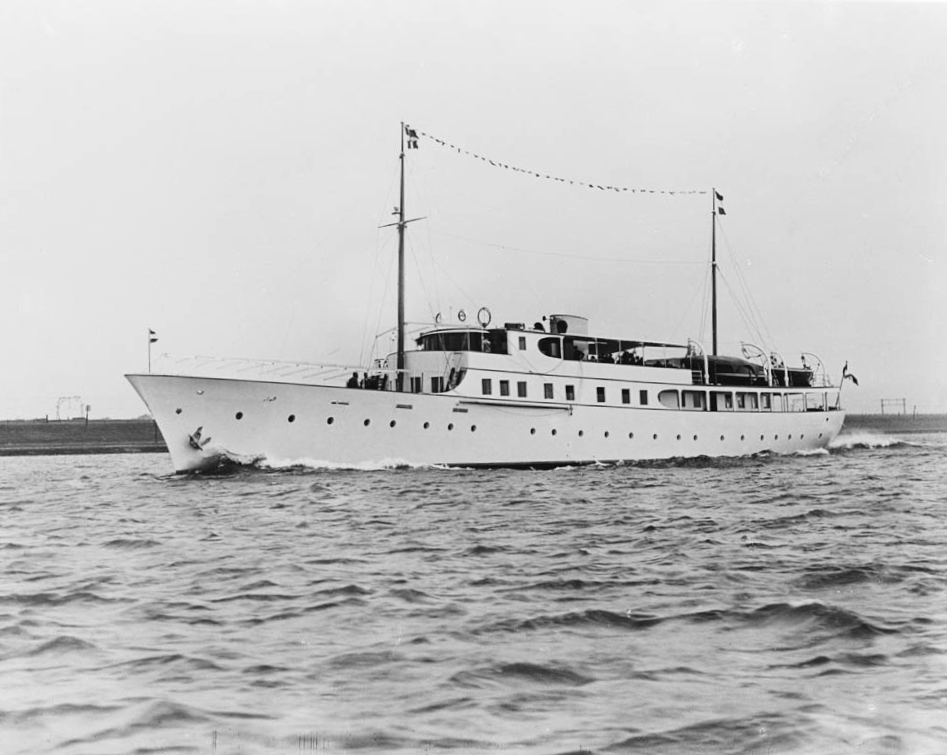
Shahsavar on the Nieuwe Waterweg, 1936

According to the terms of the contract, the yacht had to be delivered to the port of Pahlavi on the Caspian Sea. It was planned to transfer the vessel via the Volga–Baltic Waterway, utilising the inland waterway network of the Soviet Union. Due to the shallow depth of several sections of the canal network at the time, the yacht was transported aboard a floating dry-dock, which acted as a ship camel. The ships masts and funnels were removed for the journey. The trip through Soviet Russia was carried out by a Russian crew, beginning in Leningrad then transferring the ship to a Dutch-Persian crew once reaching Astrakhan.

On 9 December 1936, Shahsavar was formally handed over to Reza Shah Pahlavi in a formal ceremony.

In 1956, Shahsavar underwent a substantial overhaul by request of Shah Mohammad Reza Pahlavi at the Cantiere navale del Muggiano in Italy.

=== Later Iranian Navy service ===
Hamzeh (right) and Joshan during a naval parade, 2022

Following the collapse of the Soviet Union, and the emergence of new states in the Caspian Sea, the Iranian Navy made the decision to reinforce its Northern Fleet. In addition to the development of several Sina-class fast attack craft, the decision was made to repair and rebuild the abandoned ship, which had been abandoned since the Iranian Revolution.

IRIS Hamzeh rejoined the Iranian fleet in January 1998, with structural and equipment modifications, as well as a new naval gun, torpedo tubes and anti-ship missile launchers. Following reconstruction, Hamzeh is classified as a corvette. The vessel was also been variously described as a training ship, a miscellaneous auxiliary ship or a patrol craft.

On 23 July 2001, Hamzeh confronted the two Azerbaijani vessels Geofyzik-3 and Alif Hajiyev, operating for the British oil and gas company BP in disputed territory in the Caspian Sea between Azerbaijan and Iran. Iran claimed that the survey vessels were trespassing in Iranian territorial waters, while Azerbaijani officials responded by stating that it would not concede its rightful claims to the Alov, Araz and Sharg offshore oilfields. In response, BP announced that it would be suspending development on the oilfields until a settlement was reached between the two countries.

==== 2026 Iran–United States war ====
On 18 March 2026, the headquarters of the Northern Fleet in Bandar-e Anzali was attacked by the Israeli Air Force. Much of the fleet was destroyed while in port, including Hamzeh, which was destroyed at her moorings.

== In popular culture ==
Shahsavar served as the inspiration for the fictional yacht Sheherazade in The Red Sea Sharks, the nineteenth volume of The Adventures of Tintin, the comic series by Belgian cartoonist Hergé. The yacht is owned by millionaire film tycoon Rastapopoulos, and is named after the character of the same name from One Thousand and One Nights.

== See also ==
- List of ship launches in 1936
- List of current ships of the Islamic Republic of Iran Navy
