= IRIS Derafsh =

Iranian fast attack craft

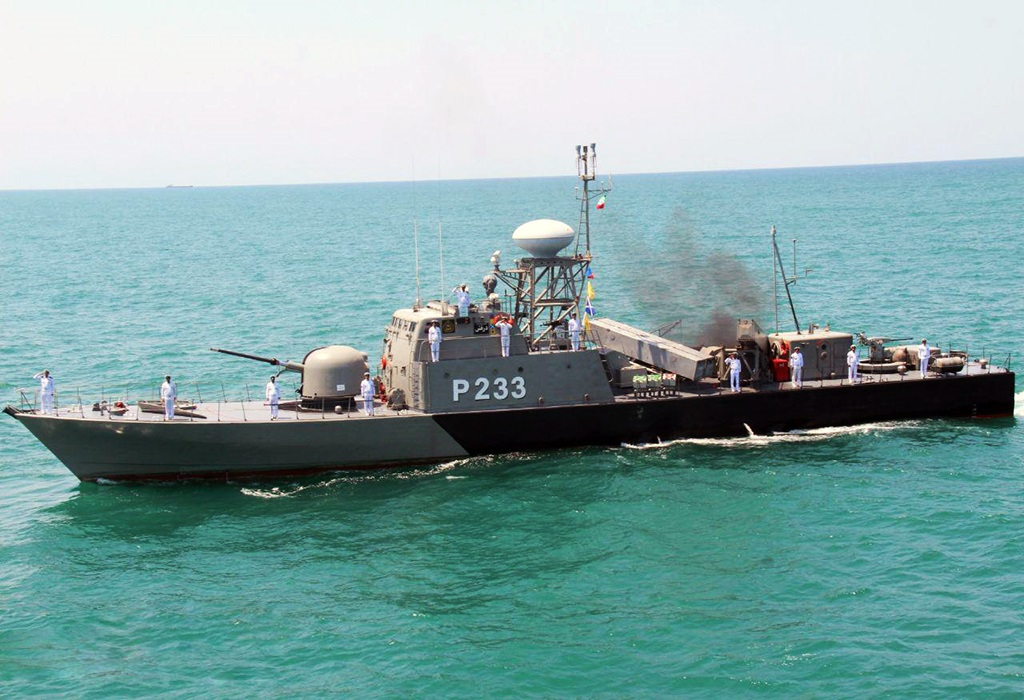

History

Iran
- Name: Derafsh
- Builder: Shahid Tamjidi shipyard, Bandar Anzali
- Launched: 27 November 2008
- Commissioned: 6 October 2009
- Home port: Bandar Anzali
- Identification: Hull symbol: P233; Code letters: EQMI
- Status: Destroyed

General characteristics
- Class & type: Sina-class fast attack craft

Derafsh (Persian: درفش, lit. 'Flag') is a Sina-class fast attack craft serving in the Northern Fleet of the Islamic Republic of Iran Navy.

== Construction and commissioning ==
It was launched on 27 November 2008 and commissioned into service in 2009.

== Service history ==
Derafsh, along with the frigate Damavand, left home for a visit to Makhachkala, Russia in March 2017.

As of 18 March 2026, Derafsh was confirmed destroyed.

== See also ==
- List of current ships of the Islamic Republic of Iran Navy
- List of military equipment manufactured in Iran
