= List of frigates of Iran =

This is a list of frigates of Iran, which have served in the Imperial Iranian Navy and the Islamic Republic of Iran Navy.

== Former vessels ==
Ship	Hull number	Class	Picture	Service				Origin
Ship	Hull number	Class	Picture	Laid down	Launched	Commissioned	Fate	Origin
IRIS Alvand (ex-IIS Saam)	71 (ex-DE 12)	Alvand class		22 May 1967	25 July 1968	20 May 1971	Sunk during the 2026 attack on Bandar Abbas.	United Kingdom
IRIS Alborz (ex-IIS Zaal)	72 (ex-DE 14)	Alvand class		3 March 1968	4 March 1969	1 March 1971	Destroyed. As of 12 May 2026, high res satellite confirms it was destroyed in dry dock.	United Kingdom
IRIS Sabalan (ex-IIS Rostam)	73 (ex-DE 16)	Alvand class		10 December 1967	4 March 1969	26 June 1972	Sunk during the 2026 attack on Bandar Abbas.	United Kingdom
IRIS Jamaran	76	Moudge class		2004	28 November 2007	19 February 2010	Sunk by U.S. airstrike on 28 February 2026, during the 2026 Iran war.	Iran
IRIS Sahand	74	Moudge class		2010	18 September 2012	1 December 2018	Sunk on 9 July 2024. On 29 November 2025, IRIS Sahand was recommissioned after reconstruction and repair. She was destroyed in the 2026 Iran war.	Iran
IRIS Dena	75	Moudge class		2012	2015	2021	Sunk by a US submarine off the coast of Sri Lanka on 4 March 2026, during the 2026 Iran war.	Iran

IRIS Damavand	77	Moudge class	2009	13 March 2013	9 March 2015	Out of service since 10 January 2018	Iran
IRIS Sahand (ex-IIS Faramarz)	74 (ex-DE 18)	Alvand class	25 July 1968	30 July 1969	28 February 1972	Sunk by U.S. Navy, 19 April 1988	United Kingdom
IIS Babr (ex-HMS Derby Haven)	None	Loch class	11 February 1944	14 December 1944	July 1949	Decommissioned on 30 October 1969, stricken in 1972	United Kingdom
IIS Palang (ex-HMS Fly)	None	Algerine class	6 October 1941	1 June 1942	1949	Decommissioned in December 1966, stricken in 1972	United Kingdom

== Future ==
Ship	Class	Picture	Service		Origin
Ship	Class	Picture	Laid down	Launched	Origin
IRIS Taftan	Moudge class		2013	2016	Iran
IRIS Shiraz	Moudge class		2014	2017	Iran
