= IRIS Separ =

Fast attack ship of Iranian naval fleet

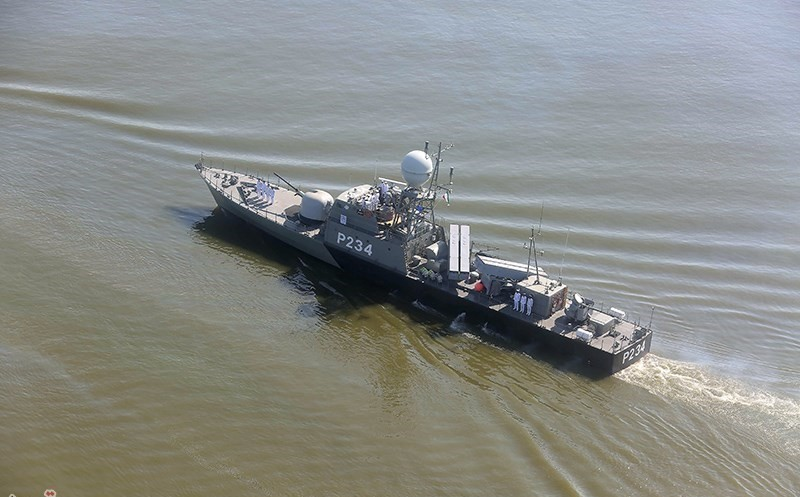

History

Iran
- Name: Separ
- Builder: Shahid Tamjidi shipyard, Bandar Anzali
- Commissioned: 5 December 2017
- Home port: Bandar Anzali
- Identification: Hull symbol: P234
- Status: Destroyed

General characteristics
- Class & type: Sina-class fast attack craft

Separ (Persian: سپر, lit. 'Shield') is a Sina-class fast attack craft serving in the Northern Fleet of the Islamic Republic of Iran Navy.

The missile-launched frigate "Separ" joined the Iranian Navy fleet on December 5, 2017, in a ceremony attended by then-Minister of Defense Amir Hatami and then-Commander of the Navy Hossein Khanzadi in Bandar Anzali. " Separ " is the fourth Sina-class missile-launched frigate, which was built in cooperation with the Maritime Industries Organization of the Ministry of Defense and the Navy of the Islamic Republic of Iran over a period of 2.5 years. A total of four Paykan-class missile-launched frigates, the product of the "Sina" project, were designed and built by Navy specialists and have been deployed in the Northern Fleet in the Caspian Sea. These vessels are: "Paykan", "Joshan", "Derafsh" and " Separ ".

== Construction and commissioning ==
She was commissioned into service on 5 December 2017.

== Service history ==
Separ, along with her sister Joshan, left home on 22 April 2019 for a training and flag mission. The two made a visit to Aktau, Kazakhstan, before returning on 29 April 2019.

The missile-launched frigate "Separ" joined the Iranian Navy fleet on December 5, 2017, in a ceremony attended by then-Minister of Defense Amir Hatami and then-Commander of the Navy Hossein Khanzadi in Bandar Anzali. " Separ " is the fourth Sina-class missile-launched frigate, which was built in cooperation with the Maritime Industries Organization of the Ministry of Defense and the Navy of the Islamic Republic of Iran over a period of 2.5 years.

Separ was destroyed on 18 March 2026.

== Specifications ==
=== General specifications of the Separ missile frigate ===
- Length: 47 meters
- Height: 3.90 meters
- Maximum speed: 35 knots
- Displacement: 275–300 tons
- Crew: 31 people
- Propulsion: 4 engines (3500 horsepower each)
- Power generator: 4 generators of 140 kW

Operational range: up to 200 nautical miles (320 km)

- Class: 4th Sina-class missile frigate
- Service area: Northern Fleet of the Iranian Navy in the Caspian Sea

=== Weapons and equipment ===
- Surface-to-surface missile system
- 76 mm cannon
- 40 mm cannon
- Fire control radar with the ability to track fighters and cruise missiles
- Anti-aircraft defense system
- Anti-surface defense system

=== Operational characteristics ===
- High maneuverability
- High speed
- Good stability in the sea Wavy
- Designed for patrol missions in close waters

== See also ==
- List of current ships of the Islamic Republic of Iran Navy
