= IRIS Joshan =

Two ships of the Iranian Navy have borne the name Joshan

- Joshan (1977), a French-made Kaman-class fast attack craft sunk in 1988
- Joshan (2006), a Sina-class fast attack craft commissioned in 2006
