= Riesco =

Riesco may refer to:

== People ==
- Ángel Riesco Carbajo
- Armando Riesco
- Germán Ignacio Riesco
- Germán Riesco
- Iola Leal Riesco

== Places ==
- Cordillera Riesco, mountain range
- Riesco Island

== Other ==
- MT Riesco, an oil tanker, sunk in 2026

== See also ==
- Riesco Gallery; see Croydon Clocktower
