= Northern Fleet (Iran) =

- Current naval bases of the Northern Fleet (in blue) and foreign port calls made by its vessels (anchor sign). Historic installations are also shown (in white).
- Active: 1742–1813; 1921–present
- Country: Iran
- Size: 3,000 personnel (2007 estimate)
- Part of: Islamic Republic of Iran Navy
- Garrison/HQ: Bandar Anzali, Gilan Province
- Equipment: 1 frigate; 1 corvette; 4 fast attack crafts; 1 minesweeper; 10 patrol boats
- Engagements: Anglo-Soviet invasion of Iran (1941)

Commanders
- Current commander: Vice Commodore Abdolvahab Taheri

The 4th Region or the Northern Fleet (Persian: ناوگان شمال) is the flotilla of the Islamic Republic of Iran Navy in the Caspian Sea.

== History ==
=== 18th century ===
The Persian fleet in the Caspian Sea was revived in 1742 by Nader Shah of Afsharid dynasty. He saw the flotilla as an essential tool to secure maritime trade and defend coasts of his northern lands, where Turkmen pirates often attacked.

By 1745, the fleet included two frigates and four smaller vessels while more were under construction at the Persian shipyards. One of the ships had a capacity of twenty cannons and reportedly was more capable than Russian ships. Englishman John "Jamal Beig" Elton supervised the shipyard located in Anzali, as well as additional facilities in Lahijan and Langarud. Moscow was unhappy with the fleet, and subsequently tried to counter Persian influence in the sea. Following the death of Nader Shah, the Russians took the opportunity of anarchy to burn down the fleet in 1751–1752 and the naval stores in Rasht.

=== 19th century ===
The Treaty of Gulistan (1813), deprived Iran from having a naval fleet in the Caspian Sea and Russia was granted with exclusive rights to operate the only naval forces in the sea, known as the Caspian Flotilla.

By the end of the 19th century, one royal yacht –"a small dilapidated paddle-wheel steamer" named Nasereddin– was the only asset of the Persian navy in the Caspian Sea.

=== 20th century ===
In 1904, Iranians began construction of Anzali's port that was completed in 1913.

Prior to and during the World War I, Iran had no naval forces in the north. The Russian Navy blockaded Anzali in 1909 and relocated some 2,000 troops to Iran using the port city. The northern part of Iran remained under Russian military occupation and was placed under their wartime administration for some year to come. The Russians also controlled navigation in the sea. By March 1917, Russian forces were weakened and the region fell into British hands to prevent an Ottoman control. Afterwards, they created the British Caspian Flotilla.

The Russo-Persian Treaty of Friendship signed in 1921, eased Iranian efforts to reestablish its Caspian fleet once again, despite the fact the Soviets unilaterally assumed the authority for a preemptive attack on Iran in case they deemed Caspian security at stake, and Iranians promised to oust non-Iranians in their naval service in the event of harming Soviet interests.

Anzali became a military port, in addition to its commercial role, during reign of Reza Shah who reigned between 1925 and 1941. The city hosted Iran's naval academy and served as a naval base before World War II.

On 25 August 1941, Soviets launched a surprise attack on Iran and their seaplanes bombed Anzali and villages in the vicinity. A day later, Iran surrendered and all of the vessels in the fleet (except for the royal yacht) were seized.

In 1969, Iran moved one of its minesweepers in the Southern Fleet that was purchased from the United States in 1959 to the Caspian via Volga. As of 1970, the fleet included two 65-ton and two 45-ton gunships, as well as several boats and launches in addition to the minesweeper.

During the 1990s, Iran started rebuilding its fleet from scratch after declaring that it assumes the right to maintain military presence in the Caspian. An Iranian naval exercise was conducted in November 1995. In September 1998, Admiral Abbas Mohtaj stated "a stronger presence in the Caspian Sea is among the future programs of the Navy". The forces held another naval exercise, codenamed Mirza Kuchak Khan, in 1999.

=== Timeline of 21st century events ===
Commissioned vessels
2003	Paykan
2004
2005
2006	Joshan
2007
2008
2009	Derafsh
2010
2011
2012
2013
2014
2015	Damavand
2016
2017	Separ

==== 2001 ====
- 23 July: Iranian corvette Hamzeh forced the vessel chartered by BP, which was going to work on Alborz/Araz offshore oil field (disputed between Iran and Republic of Azerbaijan), to leave the area.

==== 2002 ====
- Iranian authorities announced that the naval forces will be deployed in the Caspian Sea whenever it is necessary to defend national interests.
- Iran tested missiles launched from cargo ships.
- 1–15 August: Russia declined Iran's offer to participate with four warships in a large-scale naval wargame in August. It was held with presence of a fighter jet from Kazakhstan and one combat ship from Azerbaijan. Turkmenistan boycotted the wargame but Russia agreed to allow Iran to send observers.

==== 2003 ====
- October: A new gunboat was launched.

==== 2007 ====
- Russian naval group made a visit to Bandar Anzali.

==== 2008 ====
- 27 November: Derafsh was launched.

==== 2012 ====
- August: Iran threatened to deploy Ghadir class submarines to the Caspian Sea in response to Azerbaijani provocations.

==== 2013 ====
- 29 June–3 July: Marking the first voyage of Iranian navy in Volga, fast attack crafts Paykan and Joshan made a port call to Astrakhan.

==== 2015 ====
- 9–12 August: Russia ships Volgodonsk and Makhachkala, both Buyan-class corvettes, visited Bandar Anzali and participated in joint drill with Iran.
- 22 October: Naval group consisting of Damavand, Paykan and Joshan made visits to Astrakhan (the second of such mission), as well as Baku, Republic of Azerbaijan.

==== 2016 ====
- September: Iranian naval group visited Baku, Republic of Azerbaijan.

==== 2017 ====
- March: Iranian vessels made a port call to Makhachkala on 9 March, on the fifth flag mission to Russia.
- April: Starting on 8 April, the first flag mission to Kazakhstan began.
- 13–15 July: Russian corvette Makhachkala docked at Bandar Anzali (the fifth such mission).
- 6–9 October: An Azerbaijani Stenka-class patrol boat harbored at Anzali in the first Azerbaijani navy visit to Iran.
- 14 October: Damavand and Paykan left for a visit to Makhachkala (21 October).

==== 2019 ====
- 22–29 April: Joshan and Separ went on a training mission and docked at Aktau, Kazakhstan.

==== 2020 ====
- September: Iranian warships Paykan and Joshan took part in multinational exercise Caucasus 2020.

==== 2026 ====
- 18 March: the Israeli Air Force published footage of targeting some naval warships and assets in Port Anzali in Northern Iran.

== Units ==
=== Operational units ===
- Naval Base at Anzali, Gilan
- Naval Base at Astara, Gilan
- Naval Base at Amirabad, Mazandaran
- 4th Marine Brigade at Anzali, Gilan

=== Logistic units ===
- Logistics base at Manjil, Gilan

=== Training centers ===
- Naval University at Noshahr, Mazandaran
- Naval Training Centre at Rasht, Gilan
- Marine Training Centre at Manjil, Gilan

== Commanders ==
- Saifallah Anushiravani (1970s)
- Habibollah Sayyari (?)
- Afshin Rezayee Haddad (?–2017)
- Ahmadreza Bagheri (2017–2018)
- Abdolvahab Taheri (2018–present)

== Current equipment ==
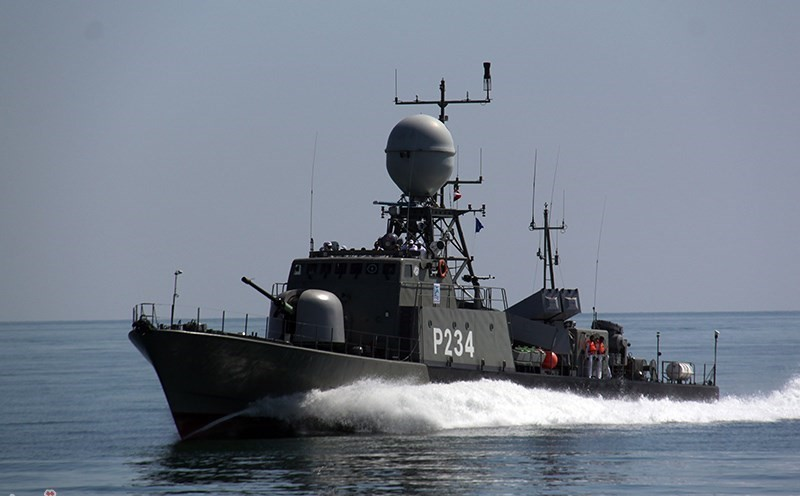
IRIS Separ (P234), commissioned in 2017

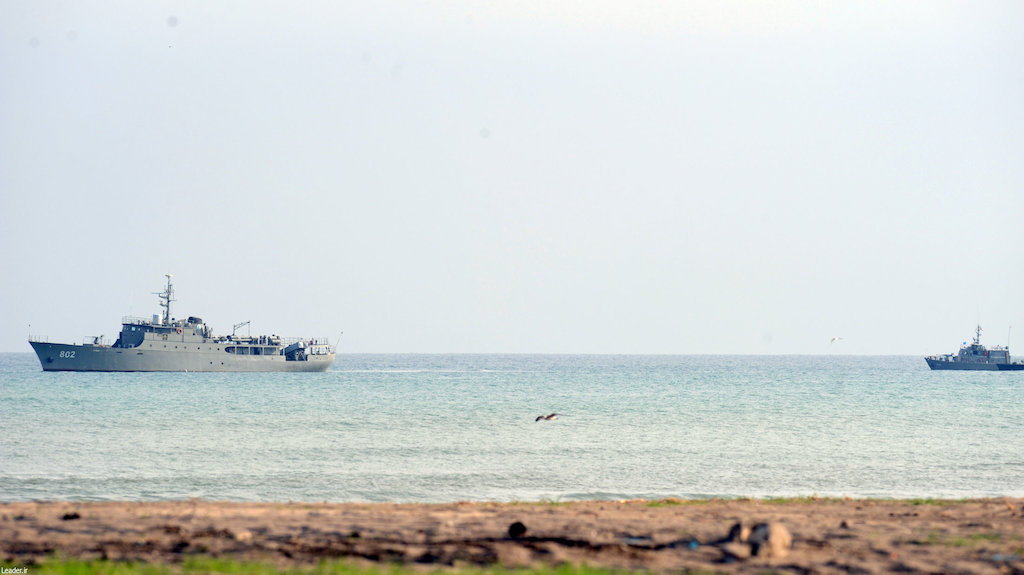
IRIS Hamzeh (802), commissioned in 1936

It is not clear how many of the vessels have survived in the northern fleet, considering in March 2026, Benjamin Natanyahu claimed that Israel had destroyed all the Iranian fleet in the Caspian Sea. However, before March 2026, the principal surface combatants in the fleet included:

Class and type	Ship	Pennant number	Commissioned	Status
Sina-class fast attack craft	Paykan	P224	2003	In service
Sina-class fast attack craft	Joshan	P225	2006	In service
Sina-class fast attack craft	Derafsh	P233	2009	In service
Adjutant-class minesweeper	Salman	302	1959	In service

Other notable vessels are in the fleet include an unknown number of Ghaem class general-purpose patrol craft, and reportedly three surviving Sewart-class inshore patrol crafts (out of the nine acquired from the United States Coast Guard in c.1953) namely Mahnavi Hamraz, Mahnavi Taheri and Mahnavi Vahedi. As of 2010, Iran was estimated to operate some 90 vessels, including auxiliary and small-sized units.

=== Assessment ===
After Russia, Iran has the second largest fleet in the Caspian sea. Tehran has strengthened its fleet since the early 2000s.

According to Paul A. Goble, with recent expansion of Iranian naval forces in the Caspian Sea, "Moscow will have to take this Iranian fleet into consideration as a potential challenge". James M. Dorsey states that Iranian growing presence is likely to boost rivalries among Caspian states.

Comparison of naval forces in the Caspian Sea (2018)
Force	Fleet						
Force	FF	FS	FAC	PB	hel	MC	amph
(Azerbaijan) Azerbaijani Navy	—N/a	1	—N/a	10	3	4	6
(Kazakhstan) Kazakh Naval Forces	—N/a	—N/a	2	22	—N/a	1	—N/a
(Russia) Caspian Flotilla	2	8	3	5	60	5	11
(Turkmenistan) Turkmen Naval Forces	—N/a	—N/a	2	17	—N/a	—N/a	—N/a
(Iran) Northern Fleet	—N/a	1	4	10	1	1	—N/a
Source: IISS via The Washington Institute for Near East Policy
