= IRIS Makran =

Ship of the Iranian Navy

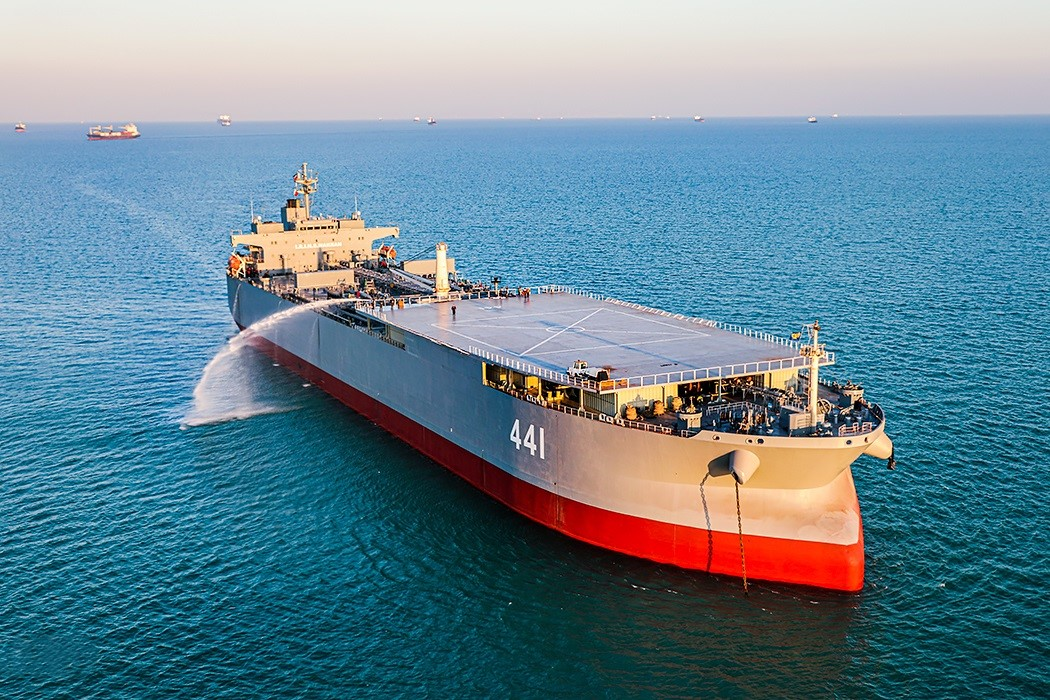

History
- Name: Makran (2021–2026); Beta (2013–2020); Al Buhaira (2010–2013)
- Port of registry: Monrovia, Liberia
- Builder: Sumitomo Heavy Industries, Japan
- Yard number: 1354
- Launched: 10 September 2009
- Completed: 8 March 2010
- Identification: IMO number: 9486910; MMSI number: 636014395; Callsign: A8TO5
- Fate: Sunk during the 2026 Iran war

History

Iran
- Name: Makran
- Namesake: Makran
- Operator: Islamic Republic of Iran Navy
- Commissioned: 13 January 2021
- Out of service: 1 March 2026 (following attack)
- Refit: 2020
- Stricken: 1 March 2026
- Home port: Bandar Abbas
- Identification: Pennant number: 441
- Status: Destroyed

General characteristics (as built)
- Type: Crude oil tanker
- Tonnage: 55,909 GT; 105,319 DWT
- Length: 229.6 m (753 ft 3 in) LOA; 217.8 m (714 ft 7 in) LPP
- Beam: 42.03 m (137 ft 11 in)
- Propulsion: 1 × Propeller
- Speed: 14.5 knots (26.9 km/h; 16.7 mph)

General characteristics (after modification)
- Type: Forward Base Ship
- Displacement: 121,000 metric tons full load
- Length: 230.13 m (755 ft 0 in)
- Beam: 42.03 m (137 ft 11 in)
- Height: 21.5 m (70 ft 6 in)
- Endurance: 1,000 days
- Aircraft carried: 6-7 helicopters
- Aviation facilities: Helipad

IRIS Makran (Persian: مکران) was the first forward base ship of the Islamic Republic of Iran Navy, in service with its Southern Fleet from 2021 until its destruction in the 2026 Iran war. It was named after a coastal region in southeastern Iran.

A former crude oil tanker converted into a warship, she was known with the tentative title Khalij-e Fars (lit. 'Persian Gulf', a name reserved for the lead ship of Project Loghman) before her name being changed to the current. Though not officially acknowledged, TankerTrackers, a firm that tracks maritime traffic, has identified her as a Japanese-built ship completed in 2010, previously named Beta and earlier Al Buhaira, and whose AIS signal was last detected in 2019 near United Arab Emirates. Her intended task/purpose was to support naval units in remote waters, especially in the North Indian Ocean, the Bab-el-Mandeb and the Red Sea.

== Construction and design ==
The ship was launched on 10 September 2009 at the Sumitomo Heavy Industries, Ltd. shipyard in Yokosuka, Kanagawa, Japan. She was completed on 8 March 2010. According to a report by Bloomberg, FAL Oil Co., a UAE-based energy trader, took a loan worth $62.4 million from German DVB Bank in July 2010, in order to refinance the construction of the Al Buhaira and another tanker.

=== Original characteristics ===
Al Buhaira was an Aframax-rated tanker capable of transporting about 80,000–100,000 metric tons (79,000–98,000 long tons; 88,000–110,000 short tons) of oil. Her recorded length overall was 229.6 m (753 ft 3 in), and she was 217.8 m (714 ft 7 in) long between perpendiculars, with a beam of 42.0 m (137 ft 10 in). The ship had a capacity of 105,319 tonnes deadweight (DWT), while her gross tonnage (GT) was 55,909.

=== Conversion ===
According to H. I. Sutton, satellite imagery shows that the conversion took place at ISOICO shipyard in Bandar Abbas, where she was "rebuilt with hangar-like sheds on the deck" and painted blue-gray to be subsequently floated in November 2020, before going on sea trials between 9 and 14 December 2020. Iranian media stated that Makran displaces 121,000 metric tons (119,000 long tons; 133,000 short tons), and put her dimensions at 228 m (748 ft) long, 42 m (137 ft 10 in) wide and 21.5 m (70 ft 6 in) tall. It was suspected she was launched in late 2020 after being refitted as a sea base and underwent sea trials in December of the same year. The ship was equipped with information collection and processing gear.

== Operational capabilities ==
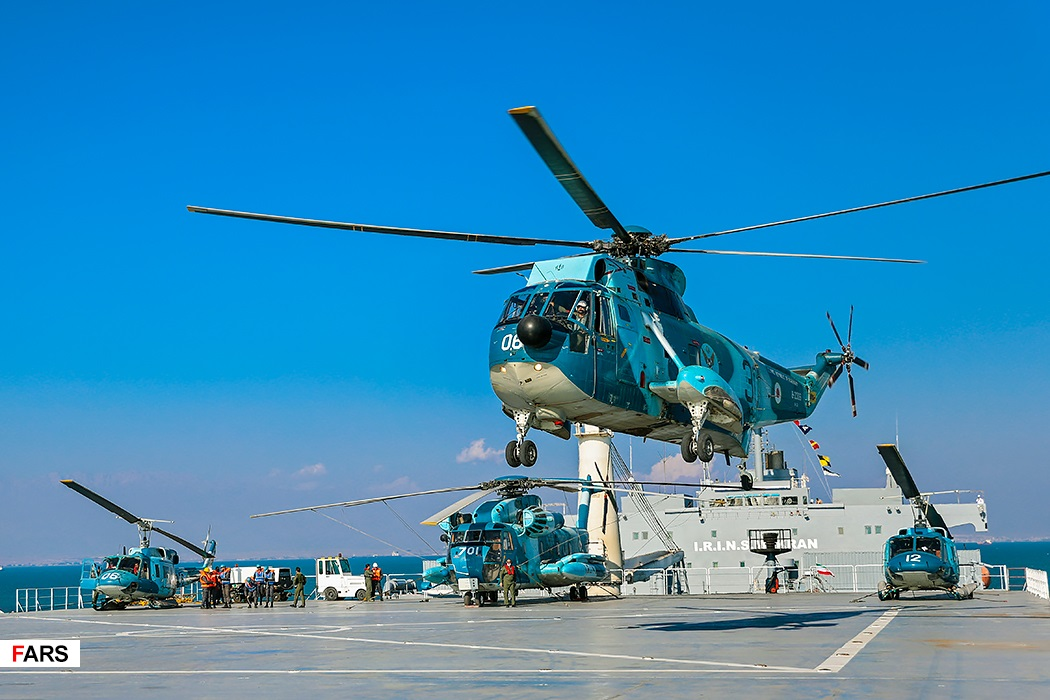
Helicopters landing at Makran's deck

Makran's exact capabilities were unclear. While the ship was generally similar to the American Expeditionary Mobile Base (EMB) vessels, she lacked the utility deck used for loading and unloading of stores and was thus believed to have a lower operational flexibility in comparison to the EMBs.

Makran could sail almost three years without docking. According to Thomas Newdick, the ship provided the navy with "persistent maritime operations in and outside of the country's own littoral areas" and could "serve as a platform for more directly challenging Iran's regional opponents, including Saudi Arabia".

She may have acted as a mothership for special operations or asymmetric operations, being used to launch speedboats, deliver or retrieve combat divers and commandos, or for the use of limpet mines.

Her helicopter deck could embark as many as seven helicopters, while platforms for launching VTOL unmanned aerial vehicles were also available. The space on the deck was large enough to accommodate weapon systems such as fixed/mobile missile launchers or large-caliber rocket artillery and their radar systems. Though surface-to-air missile systems may also have been installed, Makran apparently lacked air defense, which was considered a major disadvantage.

== Service history ==
=== Commercial service ===
For a flag of convenience, she flew a Liberian flag during her entire career as a tanker, her registered port being Monrovia. The registered owner of Al Buhaira was Al Buhaira International Shipping Inc, a company based in Dubai. Later she was owned by Ionian Shipping Management LLC, another Emirati company in Fujairah.

On 4 March 2013, Somali pirates unsuccessfully attempted to hijack her while she was sailing in the Arabian Sea in the international waters in the vicinity of Mukalla. According to a report by International Maritime Organization, "[f]our skiffs with around six persons in each skiff approached the tanker from her port bow, mid-ships and astern. A ladder and an RPG were sighted in the approaching skiffs", subsequently the master "raised the alarm, took anti-piracy measures, informed UKMTO and all non-essential crew retreated to the citadel. Onboard armed security team fired warning shots resulting in the skiffs stopping the approach at a distance of around four cables from the ship".

=== Military service ===
On 12 January 2021, she was officially commissioned into the navy. A day later, she participated in a missile exercise in the Gulf of Oman that included carrying commandos to the ship.

In June 2021, Makran and the accompanying frigate IRIS Sahand were the first Iranian naval ships to reach the Atlantic without docking in an international port, according to official Iranian sources. Early media report incorrectly suggested they were bound for Venezuela, but the ships were bound for Saint Petersburg to attend Navy Day to commemorate the 325th anniversary of the Russian Navy foundation. Makran was reported to be carrying several fast attack craft.

Makran was present at the BRICS "Will for Peace" joint naval exercise at Simon's Town, South Africa, in January 2026.

Makran was destroyed by United States forces on 1 March 2026, the second day of hostilities in the 2026 Iran war, along with other Iranian vessels moored at the Bandar Abbas naval base. According to Chairman of the Joint Chiefs of Staff Dan Caine, the United States Navy used Tomahawk missiles to target Iranian naval assets.

== See also ==
- Shahid Roudaki, a naval vessel with similar role in the other naval service of Iran (IRGNC)
- Makran-class forward base ship
- List of current ships of the Islamic Republic of Iran Navy
- 360-Degree mission of Iran's 86th Naval Fleet
