= Moudge-class frigate =

Class of Iranian light frigates

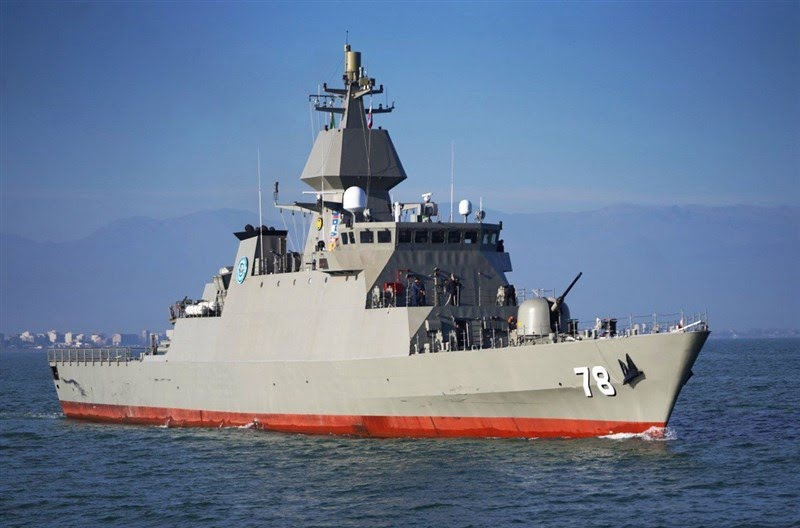
- IRIS Deylaman

Class overview
- Name: Moudge
- Builders: Iranian Navy's Factories; Marine Industries Organization
- Operators: Islamic Republic of Iran Navy
- Preceded by: Alvand class
- Built: 2001–present
- In service: 2010–present
- Planned: 7
- Building: 1
- Completed: 6
- Active: 0?
- Lost: 6 (1 unconfirmed)

General characteristics
- Type: Frigate
- Displacement: 1,500 tonnes
- Length: 95 m (311 ft 8 in)
- Beam: 11.1 m (36 ft 5 in)
- Draught: 3.25 m (10 ft 8 in)
- Propulsion: 2 × 10,000 hp (7,500 kW) engines; 4 × 740 hp (550 kW) diesel generators
- Speed: 30 knots (55.6 km/h)
- Complement: 140
- Sensors & processing systems: Asr 3D PESA long-range radar
- Electronic warfare & decoys: 2 × 8 tube chaff launcher
- Armament: Naval guns; 1 × 76 mm Fajr-27 naval gun; 1 × 40 mm Fath-40 AAA or 1 × 30mm Kamand CIWS; 2 × 20 mm cannons Oerlikon; 2 × 12.7 mm heavy machine guns; Surface to air missiles; 4 × Mehrab SAM, a naval version of the Sayyad-2 or 4 × Sayyad-3 SAM; Anti-ship missiles; 4 × Noor or Qader anti-ship missiles (Some ships are equipped with 8 anti-ship missiles); Anti-submarine warfare; 2 × triple 324 mm torpedoes
- Aircraft carried: 1 × Bell 214 ASW helicopter
- Aviation facilities: Helicopter landing pad

The Moudge or Mouj or Mowj (Persian: موج, lit. 'wave') is a class of domestically-produced Iranian frigates. The class appeared to be a development of the Alvand class.

== Classification ==
Iran officially classifies these ships as destroyers, but this is rejected by most navies internationally.

Sources differ in specifying the type of the class, either as light frigate or corvette. Alternatively, they have also been described as destroyer escorts. For instance, Jane's Fighting Ships classifies the class as FFG or frigate while the Military Balance of the International Institute of Strategic Studies (IISS), designates the ships in the class as FSGM or corvette.

== History ==
A Moudge-class ship was first reported to be under construction in 2001. Warship International wrote in 2008 that four ships of this class were under construction: Mowj (376) launched on 22 February 2007, Jamaran (377) launched on 28 November 2007, as well as Azarakhsh (378) and Tondar (379).

The first ship, Jamaran was stationed in the port of Bandar Abbas. Damavand is the second ship in this class. Damavand was constructed at the Shahid Tamjidi Marine Industries (STMI) fabrication shop on the Caspian Sea at Bandar-e Anzali. The frigate was launched in March 2013.

In January 2018, Damavand, based out of Bandar-Anzali on the Caspian Sea, ran aground on a concrete breakwater in the vicinity of its home port. It was reportedly caused by navigational error, compounded by a strong storm that created high waves and low visibility. During the incident, six members of the ship's crew fell overboard. Four of those crew members were later rescued, and two were considered missing by media sources. The Iranian Navy declined to confirm the reporting. There has been little information released in reference to the cause of the grounding, with the exception of statements of wave height and visibility caused by the storm at the time of the grounding. Photos from 2018 show that the ship's hull broke apart near the waterline approximately at the start of the ship's aircraft deck.

The Iranian Navy commissioned Dena in Bandar Abbas in June 2021.

Future units of the Moudge class are to be equipped with the Sayyad-2 anti-aircraft missiles.

During construction, the frigate Talaiyeh capsized while in dry dock. One member of the Iranian Navy was killed in the incident. No official reports have been released by the Iranian authorities.

While in port at Bandar Abbas Sahand capsized on 7 July 2024 before sinking on 9 July 2024.

== Ships in the class ==
Image	Ship	Pennant number	Shipyard	Laid down	Launched	Commissioned	Status
IRIS Jamaran	Jamaran	76	Naval Factories, Bandar Abbas	2001 or 2004	28 November 2007	19 February 2010	Sunk by U.S. airstrike on 28 February 2026, during the 2026 Iran war.
IRIS Damavand	Damavand	77	Shahid Tamjidi, Bandar Anzali	2009	28 November 2007	9 March 2015	Sunk during storm in the Caspian Sea on 28 January 2018 and scrapped. A replacement vessel Deylaman was constructed.
IRIS Sahand	Sahand (named after the earlier Sahand)	74	Naval Factories, Bandar Abbas	2010	18 September 2012	1 December 2018	Sunk on 9 July 2024. On 29 November 2025, IRIS Sahand was recommissioned after reconstruction and repair. She was destroyed in the 2026 Iran war.
IRIS Dena	Dena	75	Shahid Darvishi, Bandar Abbas	2012	2015	13 June 2021	Sunk by a US submarine off the coast of Sri Lanka on 4 March 2026, during the 2026 Iran war.
Deylaman	Deylaman	78	Shahid Tamjidi, Bandar Anzali	2017	Unknown	27 November 2023	The replacement vessel of the sunk Damavand. Sunk during strikes by the Israeli Air Force in the Caspian Sea on 18 March 2026.
IRIS Zagros	Zagros (ex-Talaieh)	313	Naval Factories, Bandar Abbas	2013	2016	15 January 2025	Converted to a SIGINT ship after significant damage in an accident during construction. Suspected to have been sunk in March 2026.
	Taftan	TBA	Shahid Darvishi, Bandar Abbas	2014	2017	Unknown	Under construction.

== See also ==
- List of frigates of Iran
- List of frigate classes
- List of naval ship classes of Iran
- List of naval ship classes in service
