= 360-Degree mission of Iran's 86th Naval Fleet =

Planned Iranian naval mission

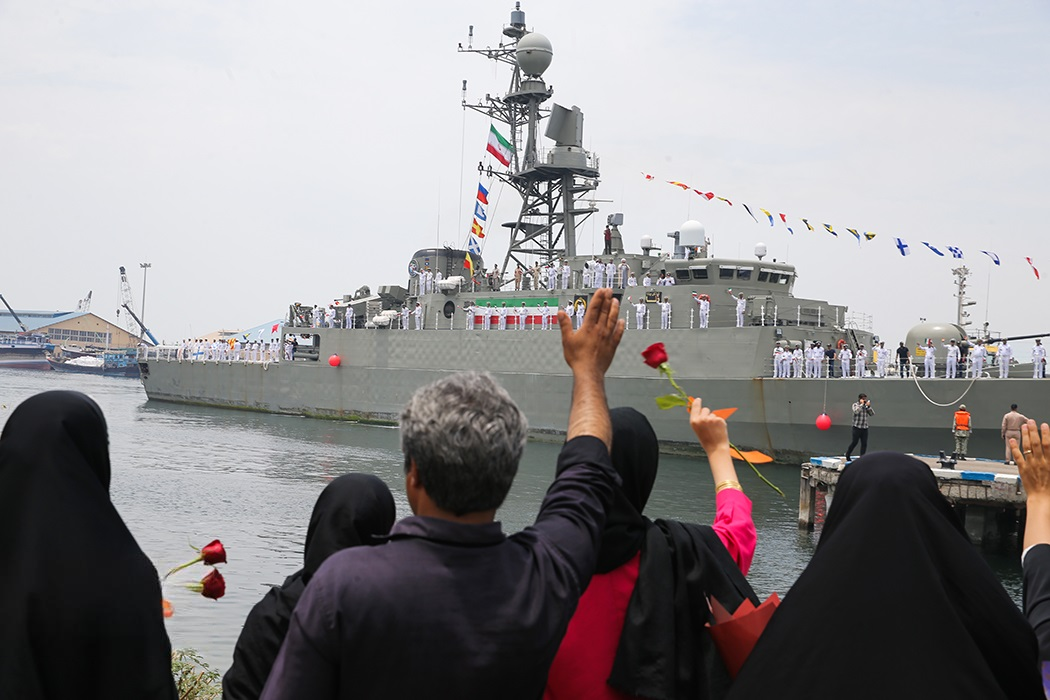
IRINS Dena returns from a circumnavigation, 20 May 2023

The 360-Degree mission was a mission planned by Iran's 86th Naval Fleet that consisted of the warships Dena and Makran traveling the world for 236 days. The trip started on Bandar Abbas in September 2022 and ended at Oman's Salalah port on 19 May 2023. According to Iranian media, this was the first time Iran's navy had crossed the world and sailed in the Indian, Pacific and Atlantic Oceans without relying on aid from shore.

The destroyer Dena was designed and built by the Islamic Republic of Iran Navy. The 86th flotilla comprises Dena, torpedoes, and naval cannons, and Makran, a warship that can carry five helicopters.

== Routes and destinations ==
The first host for the 86th flotilla was Mumbai for three days, then they passed across Indian Ocean and the Straits of Malacca and anchored in the port of Jakarta for 5 days. It begins a long and non-stop voyage from Indonesia to Brazil, more than 41,000 km across the Pacific and Atlantic by passing through Makassar Strait and Magellan and arriving in Rio de Janeiro on the 120th anniversary of Iran-Brazil diplomatic relations. After that they travel to South Africa, docked in the port of Cape Town, and then finally, they visit the port of Salalah in Oman. In total, they pass more than 63,000 km around the world in 232 days.

== Reaction ==
The Jerusalem Post stated that the 360-Degree mission illustrates the growth of Iran's investment in maritime missions.

== See also ==
- List of frigates of Iran
