= IRIS Damavand (77) =

Iranian frigate

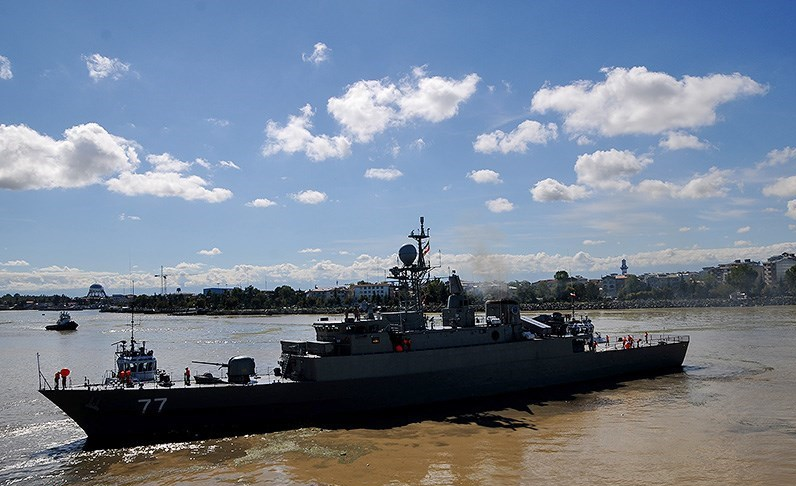

History

Iran
- Name: Damavand
- Namesake: Mount Damavand
- Ordered: 2006
- Builder: Shahid Tamjidi Marine Industries, Bandar-e Anzali, Iran.
- Laid down: 28 November 2007
- Launched: 17 March 2013
- Sponsored by: Mahmoud Ahmadinejad
- Commissioned: 9 March 2015
- Home port: Bandar Anzali
- Identification: Pennant number: 77; Code letters: EPCG4
- Nickname(s): Jamaran-2, Velayat
- Status: Lost after January 2018 incidents

General characteristics
- Class & type: Moudge-class frigate
- Displacement: 1,500 tons
- Length: 94.5 m (310 ft 0 in)
- Beam: 11.1 m (36 ft 5 in)
- Draught: 3.25 m (10 ft 8 in)
- Propulsion: 2 engine, 2 × 7,500 kW (10,000 hp), 4 diesel generators, 4 × 550 kW (740 hp)
- Speed: 30 knots (56 km/h; 35 mph)
- Complement: 120-140
- Sensors & processing systems: Asr 3D PESA long-range radar
- Electronic warfare & decoys: 2 × 8 chaff launcher
- Armament: Naval guns; 1 × 76 mm Fajr-27 naval gun; 1 × 40 mm Fath-40 AAA or 1 × 30 mm Kamand CIWS; 2 × Oerlikon 20 mm cannon; 2 × 12.7 mm heavy machine guns; Surface to air missiles; 4 × Mehrab SAM, a naval version of the Sayyad-2; Surface to Surface missile; 4 × Noor or Qader anti-ship missiles; Anti-submarine warfare; 2 × triple 324 mm torpedoes
- Aircraft carried: 1 × Bell 212 ASW
- Aviation facilities: Helicopter landing pad

IRIS Damavand (77) (Persian: ناوشکن دماوند), also known as Jamaran-2 (جماران ۲) and Velayat (ولایت), was the second ship of the Iranian Moudge class of frigates and the flagship of the northern fleet (aka Caspian Sea fleet). The class appeared to be a development of the Alvand class. It was named Damavand after inauguration in the Caspian Sea. She sank on 28 January 2018, after hitting the breakwater at Bandar-e Anzali on 10 January 2018.

== Design and construction ==
On 23 February 2010, the Iranian media reported that the production of the ship had commenced. The ship had the ability to carry helicopters, anti-ship missiles, surface-to-air missiles, torpedoes, modern guns and air defence guns. The vessel was also equipped with electronic warfare devices.

The warship used a new modern flat-type, phased array radar, which was being tested in 2011. The development of this new device took more than it was anticipated and delayed the launch of the vessel to March 2013. The fire control radar was also replaced by a modern radar dome. New sensors, e-warfare devices and radars were also installed on the vessel, further enhancing its capabilities. The frigate had a central attack and warfare management command control system integrated inside its systems, allowing the ship to track 100 surface, sub-surface, and air targets simultaneously and choose the best in-order to attack them.

== Service history ==
Damavand, previously known as Velayat, was launched in March 2013 in the Caspian Sea near the northern port city of Bandar-Anzali. Damavand tested its engines and performed a SAT test in the Caspian Sea from 16 to 17 July 2014. Damavand officially joined the Navy on 9 March 2015.

On 10 January 2018 Damavand, then based out of Bandar-Anzali on the Caspian Sea was reported to have run aground. It is believed probable that the incident was the result of navigational error, affected by a strong storm in the area which creating high wave heights and low visibility in the area. During the incident six members of the ship's crew fell overboard. Four of those crew members were later rescued, two were lost. There has been little information released in reference to the cause of the grounding, with exception to statements of wave height and low visibility caused by the storm at the time of the grounding.

A video circulated in the Iranian media showed Damavand had fully sunk in the Caspian Sea a couple of weeks after it suffered damage during the stormy weather of Anzali Port. It was thought at the time that this would possibly result in the ship being struck from the active commission list of Moudge-class frigates.

On 5 August 2019, Rear Admiral Hossein Khanzadi, Commander of the Islamic Republic of Iran Navy, was quoted (by Jane's Defence Weekly) as saying, "The destroyer has been fully revived and this has been done in 18 months." The admiral also said that the ship would be returned to service before the end of the year (of the Iranian calendar; 19 March 2020). However, the hull of a similar ship has been seen in satellite images, being built at the Caspian Sea port of Bandar-e Anzali.

In 2021, a U.S. Naval Institute news story described Damavand as "damaged beyond repair" by the January 2018 events.

== In popular culture ==
Iranian singer-songwriter Amir Tataloo filmed music video of his song Energy Hastei (lit. 'Nuclear Energy') aboard Damavand, that became viral amidst the Joint Comprehensive Plan of Action.

== See also ==
- List of frigates of Iran
