= Ghaem-class patrol boat =

Iranian ship class

Ghaem-class patrol craft
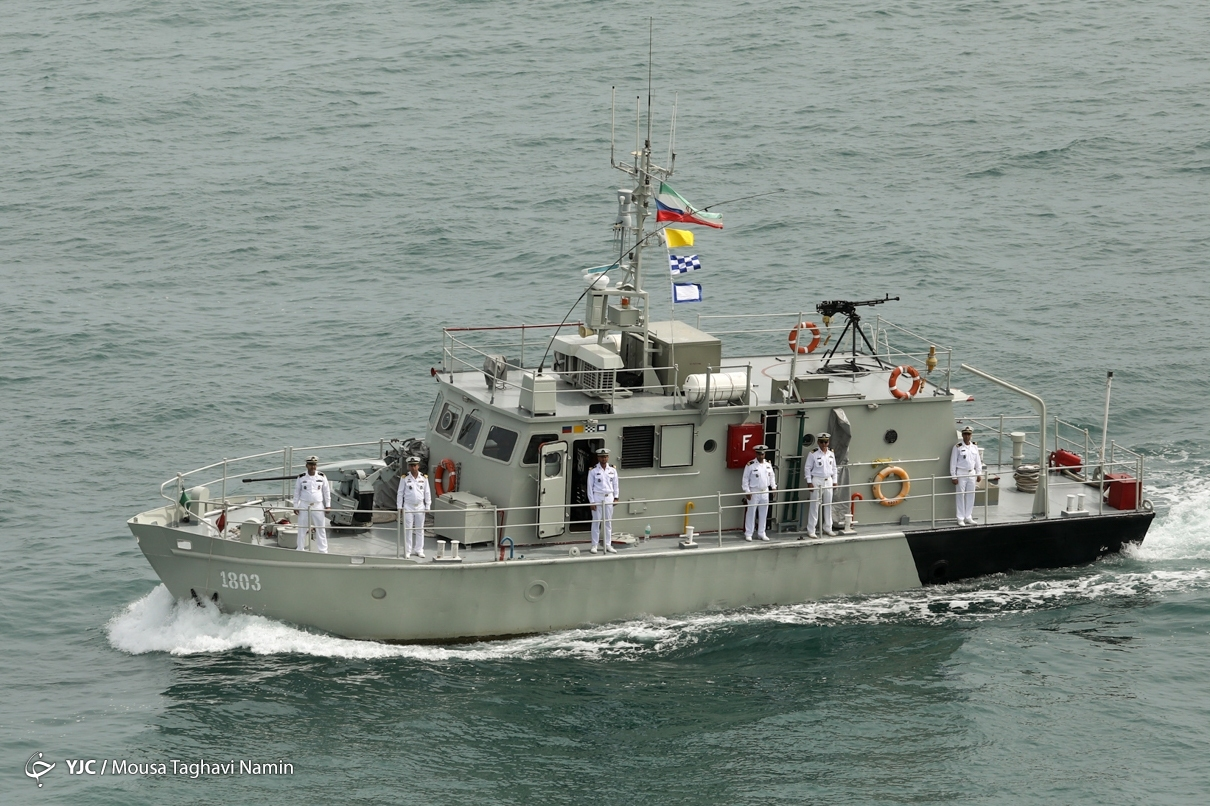

Class overview
- Builders: Marine Industries Organization
- Operators: Islamic Republic of Iran Navy; Navy of the Islamic Revolutionary Guard Corps; Syrian Navy

General characteristics
- Type: Patrol boat
- Displacement: 61 tons full load
- Length: 18.7 m (61 ft 4 in)
- Beam: 5.8 m (19 ft 0 in)
- Draught: 1.1 m (3 ft 7 in)
- Installed power: Diesel
- Propulsion: 2 × MWM TBD 234 V12 engines, 1,646 horsepower (1.227 MW); 2 × shafts
- Speed: 18 knots (33 km/h)
- Complement: 10
- Sensors & processing systems: Surface search radar, I-band
- Armament: 2 × 7.62mm machine gun; 1 × Oerlikon 20 mm cannon

The Ghaem (Persian: قائم, lit. 'risen-up', also known as MIG-S-1800) is a class of general-purpose patrol craft. The vessel is assembled in Iran, by Shahid Joolaee Marine Industries.

Its primary operators include the Navy of the Islamic Revolutionary Guard Corps, as well as the Islamic Republic of Iran Navy, which operates them in the Northern Fleet. Iran has also exported Ghaem-class patrol boats to Syrian Armed Forces.
