= IRIS Sahand (2012) =

Moudge-class frigate of the Islamic Republic of Iran Navy

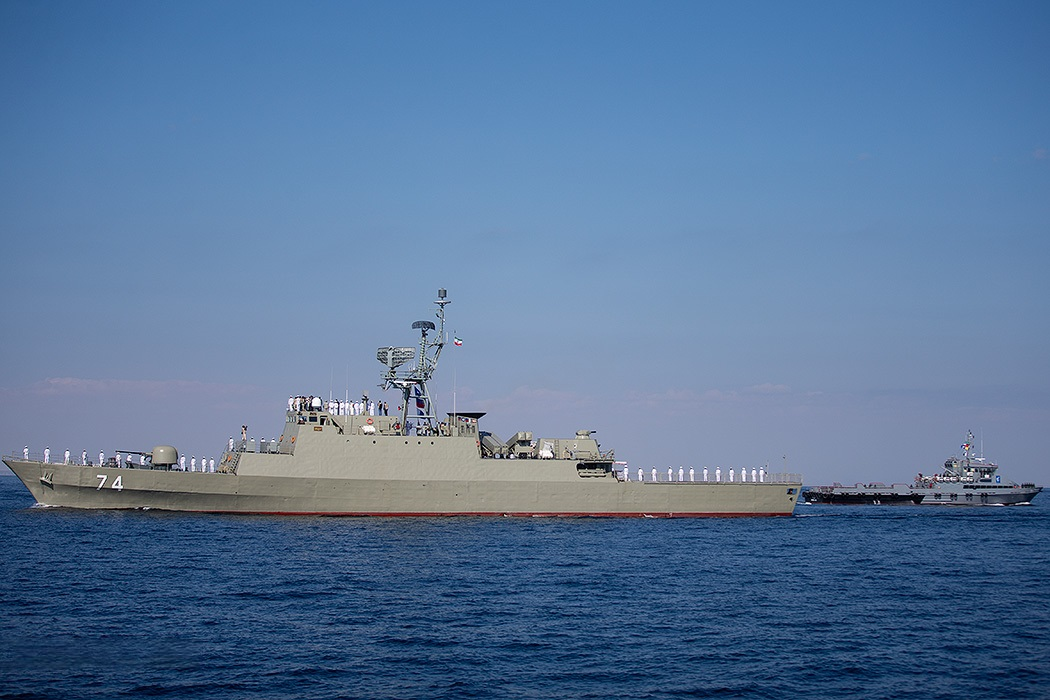
- IRIS Sahand in 2019

History

Iran
- Name: Sahand
- Namesake: Sahand
- Builder: NEDAJA Factories, Bandar Abbas
- Launched: 18 September 2012
- Commissioned: 1 December 2018
- In service: 2018–2024; 2025–2026
- Home port: Bandar-Abbas
- Identification: Pennant number: 74; Code letters: EPEA4
- Fate: Sunk during the 2026 Iran war

General characteristics
- Class & type: Moudge-class frigate
- Displacement: 1,200–1,500 tons
- Length: 95 m (311 ft 8 in)
- Installed power: 4 × diesel engines
- Speed: Max 30 knots (56 km/h; 35 mph)
- Complement: 140
- Sensors & processing systems: Asr 3D PESA long-range radar
- Electronic warfare & decoys: 2 × 8 chaff launcher
- Armament: Naval guns; 1 × 76 mm Fajr-27 naval gun; 1 × 40 mm Fath-40 AAA or 1 × 30mm Kamand CIWS; 2 × 20 mm Oerlikon cannon; 2 × 12.7 mm heavy machine guns; Surface to air missiles; 4 × Mehrab SAM, a naval version of the Sayyad-2; Surface to Surface missile; 8 × Qader anti-ship cruise missiles; 2 x Nasir anti-ship cruise missile; Anti-submarine warfare; 2 × triple 324 mm torpedoes
- Aircraft carried: 1 × Bell 212 ASW helicopter
- Aviation facilities: Helicopter landing pad

IRIS Sahand (Persian: سهند) was a Moudge-class frigate in the Southern Fleet of the Islamic Republic of Iran Navy, named in memory of the sunk frigate bearing the same name of the Sahand volcano. She was destroyed by United States forces during the 2026 Iran war.

== Description ==
Sahand was equipped with a locally-manufactured point-defense weapon system dubbed "Kamand". The Kamand close-in weapon system can destroy any target approaching the destroyer from a distance/altitude of 2–4 kilometres (1.2–2.5 mi) by firing between 4,000 and 7,000 rounds per minute. Sahand is armed with anti-ship cruise missiles and has a helicopter deck and electronic warfare systems.

Sahand was said to have twice the defensive and offensive power of Jamaran, with upgraded torpedo tubes, various types of anti-air and anti-surface weapons, surface-to-air and surface-to-surface missiles, and a point-defense system. Sahand is equipped with an anti-submarine system and a stealth system, and enjoys higher maneuverability and increased operational range. The ship has four powerful engines, an improvement on Jamaran.

Sahand was capable of sailing on turbulent waters and distant oceans for 150 days while accompanied by a support vessel.

Irani also said that Nawab, a domestically-developed medium-range surface-to-air missile system, was installed on the Sahand destroyer. Point-defense weapon systems for detecting and destroying incoming missiles and enemy aircraft and anti-missile systems have also been used in the indigenous destroyer. He also added that efforts were underway to install Abu Mahdi naval cruise missile on Iranian military watercraft, noting that the country’s destroyers would be equipped with more powerful cruise missiles. He explained that the Iranian Navy’s surface-to-surface cruise missile power had doubled and that the country’s destroyers will be deployed to high sea for the first time with 8 cruise missiles mounted on them.

== History ==
Sahand was unveiled to the public in late November 2012. All that was shown was pictures of the completed hull and superstructure. The ship was not outfitted with weapons, electronics, or other essential military equipment. These systems were due to be installed in one or two years. The ship entered service on 1 December 2018. Sahand is named in the memory of the original Sahand that was sunk by the U.S. in Operation Praying Mantis during the Iran–Iraq War on 18 April 1988.

In June 2021, Sahand, accompanied by IRINS Makran (a naval-converted oil tanker), were the first Iranian naval ships to reach the Atlantic without docking in an international port, according to official Iranian sources. Early media report incorrectly suggested they were bound for Venezuela, but the ships were bound for Saint Petersburg to attend Navy Day to commemorate the 325th anniversary of the Russian Navy foundation. Makran was reported to be carrying several fast attack craft.

=== Sinking, salvage and restoration ===
On 7 July 2024, Sahand capsized during repairs in Bandar Abbas, reportedly due to a technical fault. Several people were hospitalized from the incident, and part of the ship became submerged. Immediately after the capsizing, the head of Iran Shipbuilding & Offshore Industries Complex (ISOICO) said "there was still a possibility" of repairing the ship and restoring it to operation. Later on 9 July the ship entirely sank after the rope holding the capsized ship broke. Reportedly salvaged on 13 July, but also reportedly sank again on an even keel in slightly deeper water. On 22 July 2024, the ISOICO led salvage operation was successful and Sahand was finally pulled out of water completely. The Iranian navy said the sinking incident was due to the ship losing its balance due to water ingress while undergoing repairs at the wharf. Reports say additional fitments like SAMs might have affected the ship's stability. The ship was towed for repairs at same port of Bandar Abbas, where restoration work was carried out. On 29 November 2025, a restored Sahand was recommissioned into the navy, alongside IRIS Kurdistan, the second forward base ship of the Iranian Navy.

=== Second sinking during the 2026 Iran war ===
Sahand was destroyed in strikes by United States forces at her mooring at Bandar Abbas, alongside other ships of the Islamic Republic of Iran Navy, during the opening days of the 2026 Iran war.

== See also ==
- List of current ships of the Islamic Republic of Iran Navy
