= 27 Rajab fast attack craft =

Iranian fast attack craft

Class overview
- Builders: IRGC Navy
- Operators: Islamic Republic of Iran Navy
- In service: 2026–present

The 27 Rajab fast attack craft (Persian: ۲۷ رجب) is a missile-armed fast attack boat developed by Iran. According to Iranian military sources, the vessel is capable of reaching speeds of up to 100 knots (approximately 185 kilometers per hour) and is equipped to launch long-range cruise missiles, though many of these claims remain unverified by independent observers.

Designed with a trimaran hull — a three-pontoon structure that improves stability — the 27 Rajab is built to maneuver effectively even in rough sea conditions. Iranian officials state that the boat can carry and fire two naval cruise missiles with an advertised range of 700 kilometers. They also claim the vessel can operate safely in waters with waves as high as three meters, a feature that would allow it to remain active in the Persian Gulf when many small craft would be forced to stay ashore.

== See also ==
- List of naval ship classes of Iran
- List of military equipment manufactured in Iran
- Sina-class fast attack craft
