= IRIS Khalij-e Fars =

Iranian warship

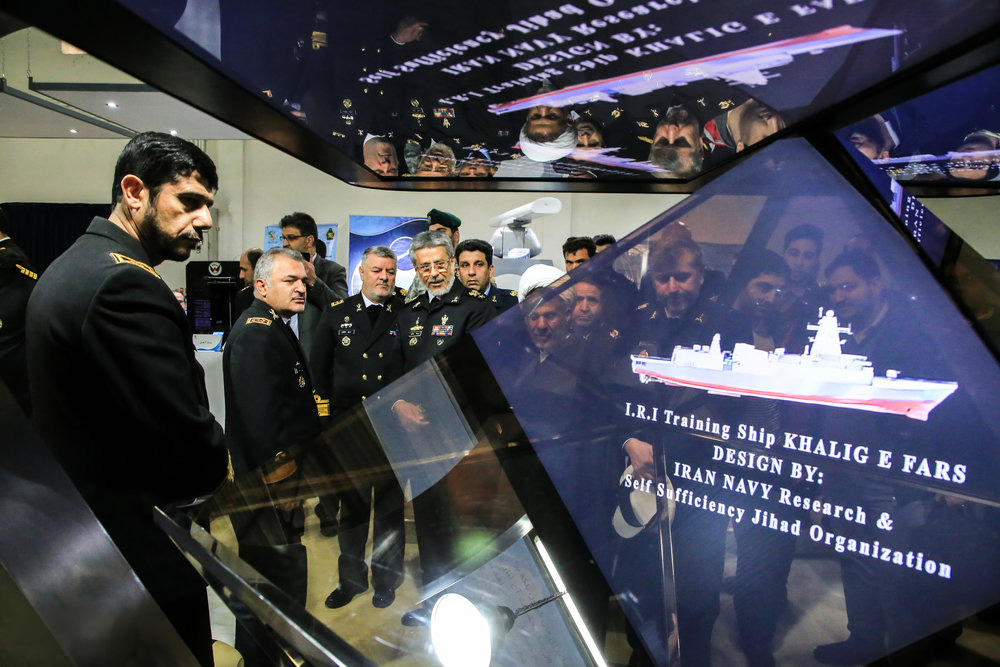

History

Iran
- Name: Khalij-e Fars
- Namesake: Persian Gulf
- Operator: Islamic Republic of Iran Navy
- Ordered: 18 September 2012
- Builder: Iranian Navy's Factories, Bandar Abbas
- Laid down: 30 November 2019

General characteristics
- Class & type: Khalije Fars-class destroyer
- Displacement: 6,500 tonnes
- Length: 154 m (505 ft 3 in)
- Beam: 18 m (59 ft 1 in)
- Draught: 5 m (16 ft 5 in)
- Speed: 25 knots (46 km/h; 29 mph)
- Range: 8,000 nmi (15,000 km; 9,200 mi)

Khalij-e Fars (Persian: خلیج فارس, lit. 'Persian Gulf') is the lead ship of Project Loghman and an upcoming training ship/destroyer of the Islamic Republic of Iran Navy currently under construction.

== Construction ==
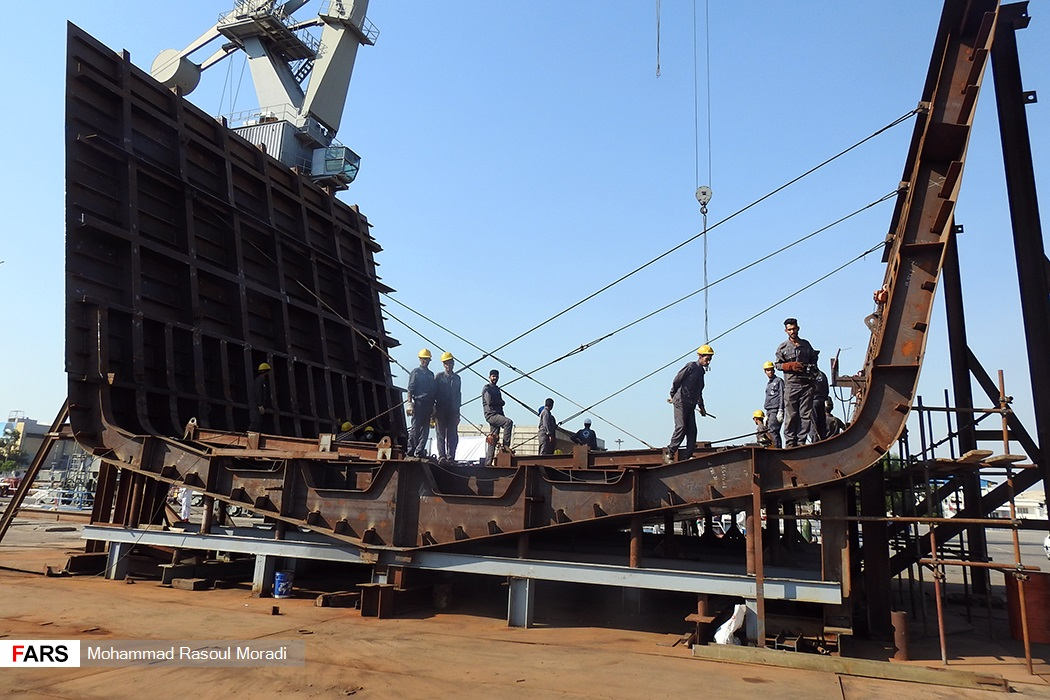
Keel laying of IRIS Khalij-e Fars

Work on the ship began on September 18, 2012, under the Project Loghman, after being confirmed by Ayatollah Ali Khamenei.

== Description ==
Khalij-e Fars is set to be 154 m (505 ft) long and would have a draft of 5 m (16 ft). The ship will approximately displace 6,500 tonnes (6,400 long tons), and reportedly can reach top speed of 25 knots (46 km/h). The nominal range of the ship is 8,000 nmi (15,000 km).

== See also ==
- List of military equipment manufactured in Iran
