= Kylo (given name) =

- Pronunciation: English: /kaɪloʊ/
- Gender: Primarily male

Origin
- Meaning: literary, created name

Kylo is a primarily masculine name usually given in reference to the Star Wars character Kylo Ren. Usage of the name has increased in the United States and United Kingdom and elsewhere. According to some sources, parents might have found the sound of the name attractive and find the character appealing despite his villainy.

== Usage ==
The name first appeared among the 1,000 most common names for newborn boys in the United States in 2016. In 2022, the year it was most popular, there were 707 newborn American boys given the name and the name was ranked in 435th position on the popularity chart. Fifteen newborn American girls were given the name in 2022.

== People ==
- Kylo-Patrick Hart, a department chair at the Texas Christian University
- Kylo Jones, a player for the Western Michigan Broncos men's basketball team
- Kylo Evergreen Maris, the son of Bill Maris
- Kylo Turner, a former singer for the Pilgrim Travelers

=== Fictional characters ===
- Prince Kylo, a character in the Doctor Who universe
- Kylo Ren, the main antagonist of the sequel trilogy of the Star Wars universe
