= MT Kylo =

Crude oil carrier that sank off the coast of Iran in 2026

History
- Name: MT Kylo
- Port of registry: Comoros
- Out of service: 6 September 2026
- Identification: IMO number: 9189146
- Fate: Sunk

General characteristics
- Length: 274.2 m (900 ft)
- Beam: 48 m (157 ft)

MT Kylo, was a VLCC (very large crude carrier), flagged to Comoros, operating as part of the sanctioned shadow fleet of Iran.

Kylo was attacked on 5 September 2026 during the Iran war, struck by four missiles fired by U.S. military forces which caused explosions and fires. The unladen tanker sank the following day off the southern coast of Iran in the Gulf of Oman. The U.S. said the attack on Kylo—plus two other tankers (MT Downy off of Kharg Island and MT Stark1 near Jask) that were disabled but not sunk—was in response to attempted Iranian attacks on U.S. Navy ships. The crews of all three tankers evacuated safely, after receiving radio warning from American forces prior to the attacks.
