= MT Riesco =

Crude oil carrier that sank off the coast of Iran in 2026

History
- Name: MT Riesco
- Port of registry: Zimbabwe
- Out of service: 8 September 2026
- Identification: IMO number: 9251822
- Fate: Sunk

General characteristics
- Length: 240.5 m (789 ft)
- Beam: 42 m (138 ft)

MT Riesco was a VLCC (very large crude carrier), flagged to Zimbabwe, operating as part of the sanctioned shadow fleet of Iran.

Riesco was sunk on 8 September 2026 during the Iran war after being struck by multiple airborn weapons fired by US Central Command (CENTCOM) which caused explosions and fires, and led to the tanker sinking off the southern coast of Iran in the Gulf of Oman. The U.S. said the attack was in response to an Iranian attack on a U.S. Navy warship. The American military said no American personnel were harmed in the attack on the Navy ship. Casualties amongst the crew of Riesco have not yet been confirmed.
