= IRIS Joshan (2006) =

Iranian fast attack craft

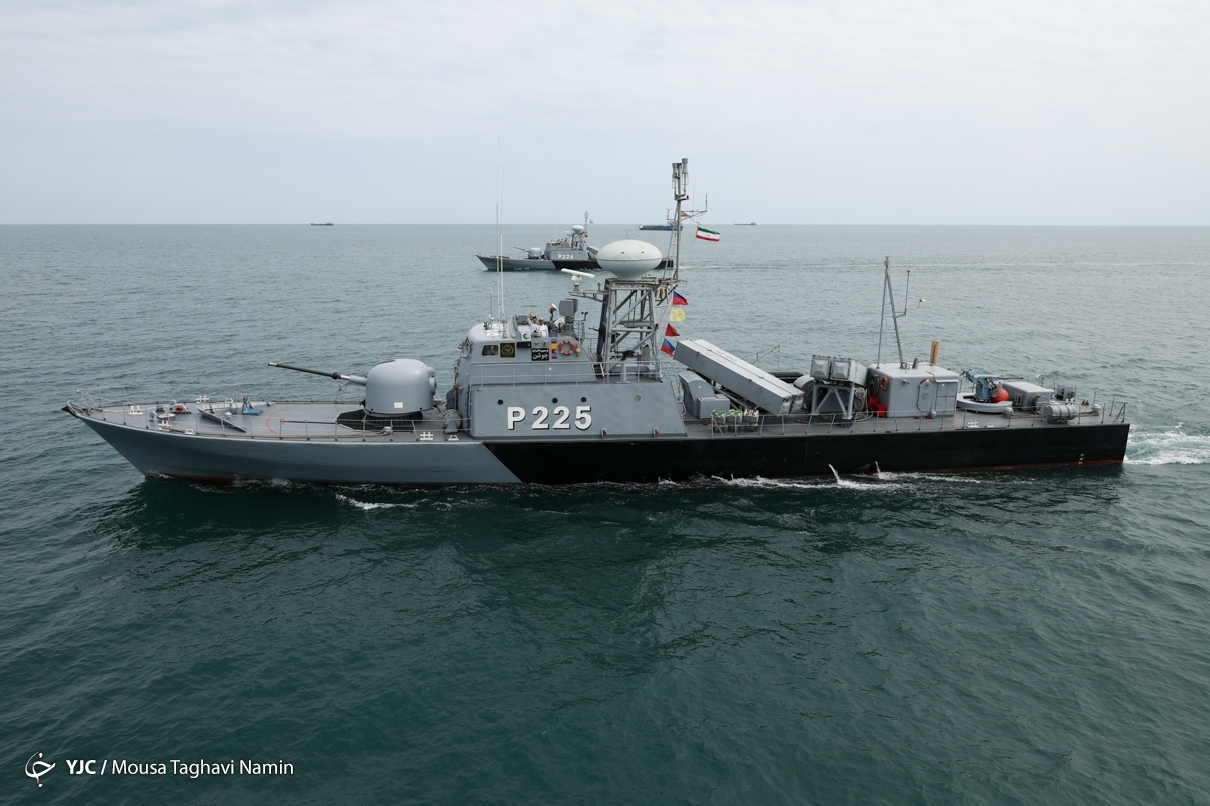

History

Iran
- Name: Joshan
- Builder: Iran
- In service: 22 September 2006
- Identification: Hull symbol: P225; Code letters: EQBE
- Status: Destroyed

General characteristics
- Class & type: Sina-class fast attack craft
- Displacement: 275 tons full load
- Length: 47 m (154 ft)
- Beam: 7.1 m (23 ft)
- Draught: 2 m (6 ft 7 in)
- Propulsion: 4 diesels, 4 shafts, 14,400 bhp (10,700 kW)
- Speed: 45 kn (83 km/h; 52 mph)
- Complement: 31
- Armament: 2 or 4 C802 surface-to-surface missiles; 1 Fajr-27 DP gun; 1 40 mm anti-aircraft gun

Joshan (Persian: جوشن) is a Sina-class fast attack craft. It was named for a vessel that was sunk by missiles fired from the US warships USS Wainwright and USS Simpson during Operation Praying Mantis in the Persian Gulf on 18 April 1988.

Joshan's launch was timed to coincide with Sacred Defense Week (22–28 September) and took place at Noshahr's Imam Khomeini Marine Sciences University.

The vessel has a claimed speed of over 45 knots (83 km/h; 52 mph), and according to Iran's Navy commander Admiral Kouchaki:

...enjoys the world's latest technology, specially with regard to its military, electrical and electronic systems, frame and chassis, and it has the capabilities required for launching powerful missiles.

As of 18 March 2026, this ship was confirmed destroyed.

== See also ==
- List of current ships of the Islamic Republic of Iran Navy
- List of military equipment manufactured in Iran
