= Sina-class fast attack craft =

Class of Iranian attack craft

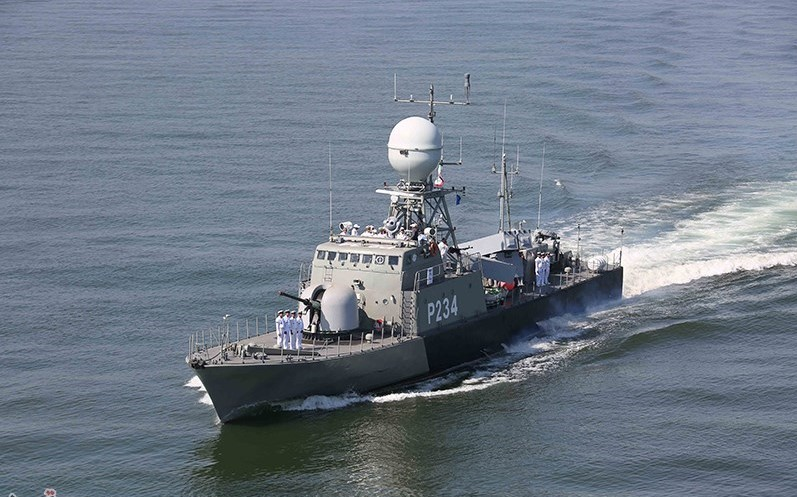

Class overview
- Builders: Marine Industries Organization; Iranian Navy's Factories
- Operators: Islamic Republic of Iran Navy
- Preceded by: Kaman class
- In service: 2003–present
- Planned: 10
- Building: 3
- Completed: 5
- Active: 1
- Lost: 4

Sina (Persian: سینا) is a class of upgraded Kaman-class fast attack craft developed by Iran.

== History ==
One of major naval production projects in Iran, it delivered Iran's first ever domestically-built warship in 2003. Abhijit Singh, a senior fellow at Observer Research Foundation described the project as "a proud testimony of Iran’s abilities at reverse engineering". According to Anthony Cordesman, Sina class ships have been "heavily updated" in comparison to the French-made La Combattante II type Kaman class. As of 2012, reportedly 10 ships were planned in this class.

Two ships of this class were destroyed during an Israeli Air Force strike on the Iranian Northern Fleet on 18 March 2026. The Pennant numbers are currently unknown.

== Armament ==
Ships of this class are equipped with four box launchers with C-802 or Noor, as well as one 76 mm (3 in) main gun.

== Ships in the class ==
As of 2015, four ships (Sina 5 to 8) were under construction, two of them in the Caspian Sea and the other two at Bandar Abbas. In 2020, Farzin Nadimi of The Washington Institute wrote that production of these ships has not improved as expected.

Ship	Pennant number	Shipyard	Commissioned	Status
Paykan	P224	Shahid Tamjidi, Bandar Anzali	29 September 2003	Destroyed
Joshan	P225	Shahid Tamjidi, Bandar Anzali	22 September 2006	Destroyed
Derafsh	P233	Shahid Tamjidi, Bandar Anzali	6 October 2009	Destroyed
Separ	P234	Shahid Tamjidi, Bandar Anzali	5 December 2017	Destroyed
Zereh	P235	Naval Factories, Bandar Abbas	13 January 2021	In service
Sina 6	TBA	Unknown	TBA	Under construction
Sina 7	TBA	Unknown	TBA	Under construction
Sina 8	TBA	Unknown	TBA	Under construction

== See also ==
- List of naval ship classes of Iran
- List of military equipment manufactured in Iran
