= Iranian Navy's Factories =

Shipyard in Bandar Abbas, Hormozgan, Iran

NEDAJA Factories
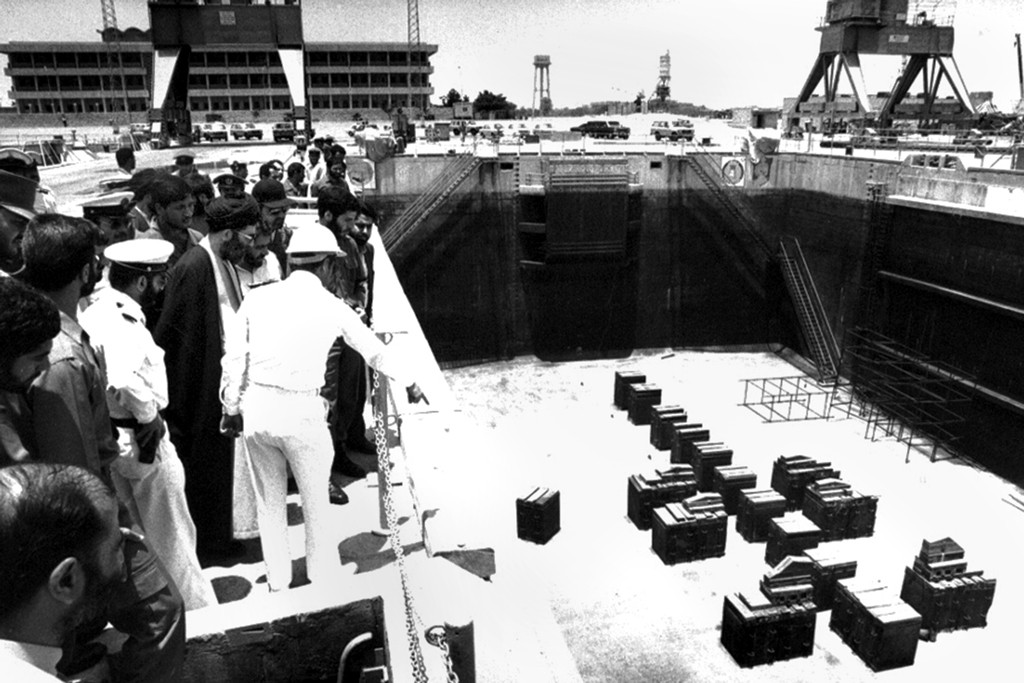
- Formation: 1976; 50 years ago
- Headquarters: Bandar Abbas, Iran
- Commander: Cdre. MOHAMMAD SADEGH SOLIMANPOUR
- Parent organization: Islamic Republic of Iran Navy

The Iranian Navy's Factories (Persian: کارخانجات نداجا) is the shipyard of the Islamic Republic of Iran Navy located in Bandar Abbas, Hormozgan Province.

== Products ==
As of 2018, the shipyard has completed two Moudge-class frigates. There is also a Sina-class fast attack craft under construction.

- IRIS Jamaran (76) frigate
- IRIS Sahand (74) frigate
- Sina-class fast attack craft (under construction)
- Khalije Fars-class destroyer (under construction)

== See also ==
- Marine Industries Organization
- Iran Electronics Industries
- Aerospace Industries Organization
- Iran Airports Company
- Iran Electronics Industries
- Iran Insurance Company
- Iranian Central Oil Fields Company
- Iranian Offshore Oil Company
- Atmospheric Science and Meteorological Research Center
- Atomic Energy Organization of Iran
- Emergency Medical Services Organization of Iran
- Iranian Defence Council
- Iranian Space Agency
- National Organization for Passive Defense
- Assassination of Iranian nuclear scientists
- Targeted killings by Israel
- Supreme National Security Council
