= Asr (radar) =

Iranian long-range radar

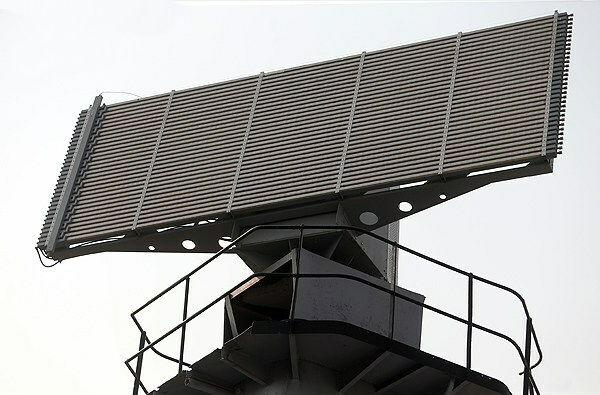
Asr radar (2013)

Asr (Persian: رادار عصر Radar) is an Iranian passive electronically scanned array long-range radar unveiled in 2013. The Air Surveillance Radar or ASR is a 3-D solid state phased array radar, capable of detecting boats, low flying aircraft with a radar cross section (RCS) of 4 m^{2} (43 sq ft) at a range of 5–110 nmi (6–127 mi; 9–204 km). The radar is jointly designed and built by the Islamic Republic of Iran Navy and the Ministry of Defence and Armed Forces Logistics (Iran).

== Specifications ==
The indigenous ASR naval radar uses a passive electronically scanned array, which can be deployed on shore or on ships, making it less vulnerable to anti-radar missiles that use radar signals to home in on their target.

== Ceremony ==
The "Asr" radar was unveiled at a ceremony attended by Deputy Supreme Commander of the Islamic Republic of Iran and the Islamic Republic of Iran Navy commander in 2013.
