= Mehrab (missile) =

Iranian surface-to-air missile

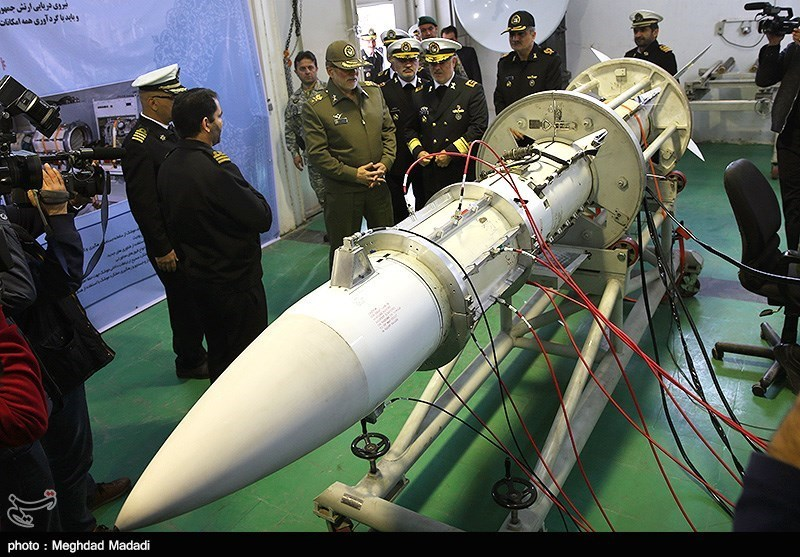
- Type: Short-range surface-to-air missile
- Place of origin: Iran

Service history
- Used by: Iran

Specifications
- Propellant: Solid fuel

Mehrab (Persian: موشک محراب) or Altar is an Iranian-designed, short-ranged surface-to-air missile (SAM).

== Design ==
According to IRGC officials speaking to Iranian state-media sources, the missile contains "a built-in system that enables it to thwart jammers". The missile was reportedly test fired between December 2011 and January 2012.
