= IRIS Jamaran =

Iranian Moudge-class frigate

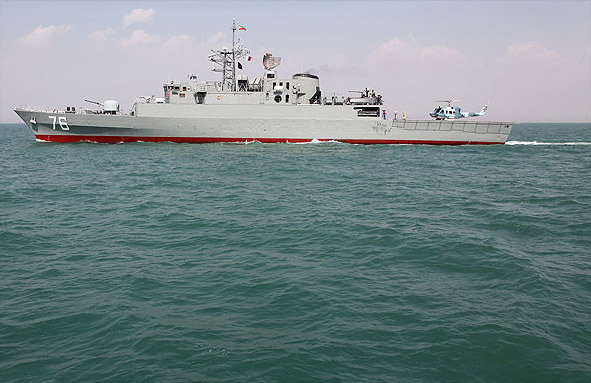

History

Iran
- Name: Jamaran
- Namesake: Jamaran
- Operator: Islamic Revolutionary Guard Corps Navy
- Builder: Iranian Navy's Factories, Bandar Abbas
- Laid down: 2001 or 2004
- Launched: 28 November 2007
- Sponsored by: Ali Khamenei
- Commissioned: 19 February 2010
- Home port: Bandar-Abbas
- Identification: Pennant number: 76; Code letters: EQAH
- Fate: Sunk on 28 February 2026

General characteristics
- Class & type: Moudge-class frigate
- Displacement: 1,500 tonnes
- Length: 95 m (311 ft 8 in)
- Beam: 11.1 m (36 ft 5 in) estimated
- Draught: 3.25 m (10 ft 8 in) estimated
- Propulsion: 2 × 10,000 hp (7,500 kW) diesel engines; 4 diesel generators; 4 x 740 hp (550 kW)
- Speed: 30 kn (56 km/h; 35 mph)
- Complement: 140
- Sensors & processing systems: Phased array Asr radar (installed 2014)
- Armament: 1 × 76 mm DP rapid fire auto-cannon; 1 × Fath 40 mm AA cannon; Bofors copy; 8 × SSMs C-802 / Noor; 2 × Crew-served 20 mm cannons Oerlikon; 2 × triple 324 mm light torpedoes; 4 × Sayyad-2 SAMs
- Aircraft carried: 1 x Bell 212 ASW helicopter
- Aviation facilities: helipad
- Notes: Jamaran was equipped with modern radars and electronic warfare capabilities

IRIS Jamaran (Persian: جماران) was the lead ship of the Iranian Moudge-class frigate launched in early 2010 in Bandar-e-Abbas, Iran. Iran stated that the design and building of Jamaran was among the greatest achievements of the Iranian Navy and IRGC Navy and the ship's launch marked a major technological leap for Iran's naval industries. The ship was designed for a crew of 140. Jamaran combined anti-submarine assets with other systems of weapons capable of dealing with surface and air threats as well.

Jamaran was sunk on 28 February 2026 by a U.S. airstrike while in port.

== Description ==
=== Weapons systems ===
The primary weapon deployed by Moudge-class vessels is the Sikorsky SH-3 Sea King, which acts in concert with shipboard sensors to seek out and destroy submarines at long range. The Moudge class also carries a close-in anti-submarine torpedo system, a 324 mm (13 in) light torpedo with a 30 kilometres (19 mi) range, mounted in triple torpedo launchers on either side of the stern.

To deal with surface forces, the vessel is equipped with four Noor / C-802 surface-to-surface anti-ship cruise missiles, mounted in box launchers on the roof of the upper deck level between the radar and the main mast pointing towards either sides. The single shot hit probability of the Noor, with a range of 170 km (110 mi), is estimated to be as high as 98%.

For anti-aircraft self-defense, the Moudge class is equipped with four medium range Fajr surface-to-air missiles (reversed engineered from the RIM-66/SM-1 standard missile) with 74 km (46 mi) range, and 24.4 km (15.2 mi) flight ceiling, mounted in box launchers at the deck above the main deck level in front of the helicopter landing pad. The Moudge class also carries two 20 mm gunner-operated Oerlikon cannons and a 40 mm Fateh-40 autocannon (reverse engineered from Bofors L/70) with 12.5 km (7.8 mi) aerial range, to provide a shipboard point-defense against incoming anti-ship missiles and aircraft.

The main gun on the forecastle of the Moudge class is a 76 mm (3 in) Fajr-27 gun. The gun is capable of firing at a rate of 85 rounds per minute at a range of more than 17 km (11 mi) towards surface targets and 12 km (7.5 mi) towards aerial targets. The Fajr-27 is a multi-purpose weapon, capable of dealing with surface, air, and onshore targets.

=== Countermeasures ===
Jamaran possessed chaff and flare systems and electronic warfare capabilities.

=== Sensors and equipment ===
The ship was equipped with one Asr passive electronically scanned array long-range radar for air and surface search and tracking, installed on the roof of forward of the funnel. The ship was also fitted with two navigation radars on the mainmast. The ship was equipped with one fire control radar.

=== Propulsion ===
The Moudge-class vessels are powered by two 7,500 kW (10,000 hp) engines, and uses four diesel generators which each generate 550 kW (740 hp). The Moudge class can reach a maximum speed of 30 kn (56 km/h; 35 mph).

=== Helicopter landing platform ===
Jamaran could accommodate a medium-sized helicopter, and could also perform helicopter in-flight refueling (HIFR) operations.

== Service history ==
The frigate was involved in a deadly friendly fire incident in the Gulf of Oman on 10 May 2020, resulting in the loss of at least 19 Iranian sailors. According to multiple media reports, during a naval exercise near the southern city of Jask, south of the Strait of Hormuz, Jamaran mistakenly launched a missile at the support vessel Konarak. The support ship sustained significant damage, leading to the casualties and injuries of numerous crew members.

On 1 September 2022, Jamaran took two Saildrone Explorers that were property of the United States Navy. According to a statement by the United States Fifth Fleet, two nearby U.S. Navy guided-missile destroyers, USS Nitze and USS Delbert D. Black, responded quickly. According to a U.S. defense official who spoke on condition of anonymity, Nitze sent a MH-60R Sea Hawk helicopter ahead to the Iranian ship as the destroyers made their way to intercept. The helicopter crew spotted the Saildrones on the ship's deck, but as they approached, the Iranian crew began to throw tarps on top of them "to try to hide the fact that they had seized these unmanned vessels." The two destroyers arrived and stayed in the area, speaking with the Iranian ship "to deescalate the situation and recover the seized Saildrones", according to the statement. The Iranians eventually said that they had been told by their headquarters to return the vessels, the defense official said, but they wanted to wait until the sun came up. The drones were released at 8:00 am local time Friday morning.

In the wake of rising tensions between Iran and Israel in April 2024, Iran announced the frigate would be convoying Iranian commercial traffic through the Red Sea.

=== Sinking ===
On 28 February 2026, the opening day of hostilities in the 2026 Iran war, Jamaran was struck by United States forces at Chabahar Port, set ablaze, and sunk.

== See also ==
- List of current ships of the Islamic Republic of Iran Navy
