= Fajr-27 =

Iranian naval gun

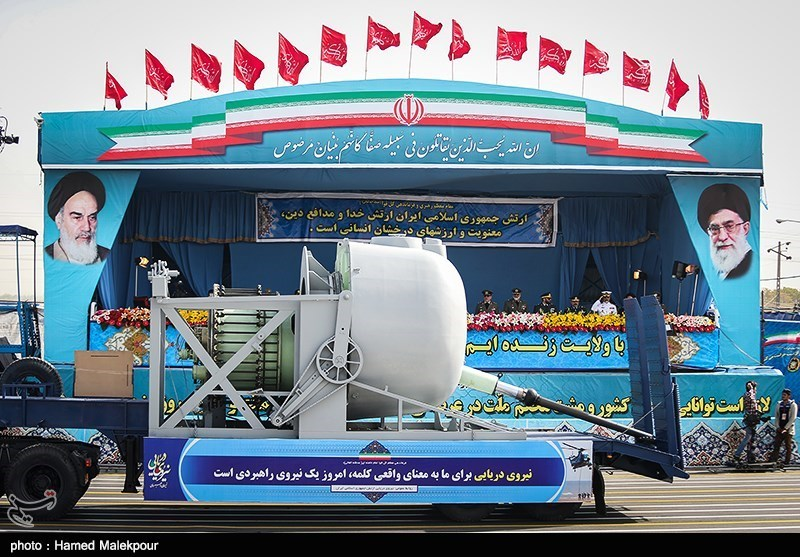
- Type: Naval Defence Cannon
- Place of origin: Iran

Service history
- Used by: Islamic Republic of Iran Navy

Production history
- Manufacturer: Iran
- Produced: September 2006

Specifications
- Caliber: 76 mm (Medium)
- Rate of fire: 85 rds/min
- Effective firing range: 7 km (aerial) 17 km (surface)

The Fajr-27 system is an Iranian unlicensed copy of the Italian OTO Melara 76mm naval gun.

The system was publicly unveiled for the first time in September 2006.

== See also ==
- Islamic Republic of Iran Armed Forces
- Defense industry of Iran
- List of equipment of the Iranian Army
