= Iran–Iraq War order of battle =

These are the orders of battle of the Iraqi and Iranian armies for the start of the Iran–Iraq War in 1980.

== Iraq ==
=== Iraqi Army ===
1st Corps (Iraq) (HQ in Kirkuk), facing Iranian Kurdistan

- 7th Infantry Division
  - 28th, 39th and 40th Infantry Brigades
- 11th Infantry Division
  - 111th, 112th, 113th Infantry Brigades

2nd Army Corps (HQ in Baghdad, ACP in Khanaqin), between Qasr-e-Shirin and Dezful

- 6th Armored Division
  - 16th, 25th and 30th Tank Brigades (T-62)
- 8th Infantry Division
  - 3rd, 22nd and 23rd Infantry Brigades
- 4th Infantry Division
  - 5th, 18th and 29th Infantry Brigades
- 12th Armoured Division
  - 15th Mechanized Brigade, 9th Tank Brigade (T-55)
- 10th Republican Guard Tank Brigade (T-72)
- 2nd Infantry Division
  - 2nd, 4th and 36rh Infantry Brigades
- 37th Tank Brigade (T-55) (Detached from the 12th Armoured Division)

3rd Army Corps (HQ in Basra), facing Khuzestan

- 10th Armoured Division
  - 24th Mechanized Brigade, 17th and 45th Tank brigades (T-62/T-55)
- 1st Mechanized Division
  - 1st and 27th Mechanized Brigades, 34th Tank Brigade (T-55)
- 9th Armoured Division
  - 14th Mechanized Brigade, 35th (T-62) and 43rd (T-55) Tank Brigades
- 5th Mechanized Division
  - 20th and 23rd Mechanized Brigades
- 3rd Armoured Division
  - 8th Mechanized Brigade, 6th and 12th Tank Brigades (T-62)

General reinforcements

- 31st, 32nd and 33rd Special Forces Brigades, in Baghdad
- 42nd Parachute Brigade, in Baghdad and Kut
- 147th (Scud-B) and 148th (Frog-7) Artillery Brigades

=== Iraqi Army Aviation Corps ===
- 2nd Squadron (Mi-8/17)
- 4th Squadron (Mi-8/17)
- 12th Squadron (Mi-8/17)
- 15th Squadron (Mi-8/17)
- 21st Squadron (SA.342 Gazelle)
- 22nd Squadron (SA.342 Gazelle)
- 25th Squadron (Mi-25)
- 30th Squadron (SA.316B Alouette III)
- 31st Squadron (SA.342 Gazelle)
- 55th Squadron (Mi-8/17)
- 61st Squadron (Mi-25)
- 66th Squadron (Mi-25)
- 84th Squadron (SA.342 Gazelle)
- 88th Squadron (SA.342 Gazelle)

=== Iraqi Air Force ===
- 1st Squadron (16 Su-20) (Kirkuk)
- 3rd Squadron (1 Tu-124, 3 Falcon 20) (Baghdad)
- 5th Squadron (18 Su-22) (Mosul)
- 7th Squadron (18 MiG-21F/P) (Baghdad)
- 8th Squadron (16 Su-7, 7 Su-7U) (Kut)
- 9th Squadron (18 MiG-21MF) (Mosul)
- 10th Squadron (12 Tu-22, 6 Tu-16, 2 Tu-22U) (Tammuz)
- 11th Squadron (20 MiG-21MF) (Baghdad)
- 14th Squadron (16 MiG-21bis) (Kut and Basra)
- 17th Squadron (7 MiG-21F, 12 MiG-21U) (Tikrit)
- 23rd Squadron (10 An-12, 9 An-24, 2 An-26) (Baghdad)
- 27th Squadron (12 MiG-21P, 12 MiG-21U, 8 MiG-23U) (Baghdad)
- 29th Squadron (18 MiG-23BN) (Kut)
- 33rd Squadron (6 Il-76) (Baghdad)
- 37th Squadron (16 MiG-21bis) (Kirkuk)
- 39th Squadron (18 MiG-23E) (Tammuz)
- 44th Squadron (16 Su-22) (Kirkuk)
- 47th Squadron (16 MiG-21bis) (Kirkuk)
- 49th Squadron (18 MiG-23BN) (Nasiryiah)
- 70th Squadron (12 MiG-21MF, 4 MiG-21R) (Baghdad)
- 109th Squadron (18 Su-22) (Basra)

=== Iraqi Navy ===
At Basra

- 6 torpedo boats (P-6 Class),
- 3 Light Patrol Boats
- 3 Minesweepers
- 1 Naval Infantry Battalion

At Umm Qasr

- 14 Missile Boats (Osa-Class)
- 7 Light Patrol Boats
- 4 Amphibious Assault Ships (Polnocny Class)
- 2 Naval Infantry Battalions
- 1 Frogmen Group
- Super Frelon helicopters armed with Exocet missiles

At Al-Faw

- 4 Torpedo Boats
- 3 Light Patrol Boats
- 2 Minesweepers
- 1 Naval Infantry Battalion

=== Other forces ===
Sudan sent seven infantry brigades (53,000 men) to help Iraq against Iran. In addition, 20,000 Arab volunteers fought in the Iraqi army from five different countries, such as Egypt, Jordan, Morocco, North Yemen and Tunisia.

== Iran ==
=== Iranian Army ===
In Tehran

- 21st Mechanized Division
  - 1st, 2nd, 3rd and 4th mechanized Brigades (BTR-60)
- 15th Mountain Infantry Brigade
- 23rd Special Forces Brigade

In Qazvin

- 16th Armoured Division
  - 1st, 2nd and 3rd Tank Brigades (M60)

In Shiraz

- 37th Tank Brigade (M-48)
- 55th Parachute Brigade

In Kurdistan

- 28th Mechanized Division
  - 1st Tank Brigade (M48), 2nd and 3rd Mechanized Brigades (M113)
- 6rh Motorized Infantry Division
  - 1st, 2nd and 3rd Infantry Brigades

In Kermanshah

- 81st Armoured Division
  - 1st, 2nd and 3rd Tank Brigades (Chieftain)
- 84th Mechanized Brigade (M113)

In Khuzestan

- 92nd Armoured Division
  - 1st, 2nd and 3rd Tank Brigades (Chieftain)
- 138th and 141st Mechanized Infantry Battalions from the 21st Mechanized Division
- 151st Fortification Battalion reinforced by a naval infantry battalion in Khorramshahr
- Two tank battalions detached from the 37th and 88th Tank Brigades
- 22nd and 55th Artillery Brigades

In the Northeast, facing the USSR and Afghanistan

- 77th Mechanized Division
  - 1st Tank Brigade (M47), 2nd and 3rd Mechanized Brigades (BTR-50)
- 30th Motorized Infantry Brigade (BTR-60)

In Zahedan

- 88th Tank Brigade (Chieftain)

=== Iranian Army Aviation ===
- 1st Direct Combat Support Group (Kermanshah)
  - 3 Attack Battalions (1 operational) (AH-1J)
  - 3 Assault Battalions (1 operational) (Bell 214A)
  - 2 Reconnaissance Battalions (1 company operational) (Bell 206)
  - 1 Transport Battalion (1 company operational) (CH-47C)
  - Detachment at Qassr-e-Shirin (AH-1J, Bell 214A, Bell 206)
- 2nd Direct Combat Support Group (Masjed Soleyman)
  - 2 Attack Battalions (1 company operational) (AH-1J)
  - 2 Assault Battalions (1 company operational) (Bell 214A)
  - 1 Reconnaissance Battalions (1 company operational) (Bell 206)
  - 1 Transport Company (Few helicopters operational) (CH-47C)
- 3rd Direct Combat Support Group (Kerman)
  - 1 Attack Battalion (1 company operational) (AH-1J)
  - 1 Assault Battalion (1 company operational) (Bell 214A)
  - 1 Reconnaissance Company (1 company operational) (Bell 206)
  - 1 Transport Company (Few helicopters operational) (CH-47C)
  - Detachment at Qassr-e-Shirin (AH-1J, Bell 214A)
- 4th General Support Group (Kermanshah)
  - 4 Attack Battalions (1 operational) (AH-1J)
  - 5 Assault Battalions (1 operational) (Bell 214A)
  - 3 Reconnaissance Battalions (1 company operational) (Bell 206)
  - 1 Transport Battalion (1 company operational) (CH-47C)
  - 1 Transport Battalion (1 company operational) (Turbo Commander)
  - 1 Transport Battalion (1 company operational) (F.27)
- 5th Operational Communications Company
  - Miscellaneous detachments and aircraft

=== Iranian Air Force ===
- 1st Wing (Tehran-Mehrabad)
  - 11th Squadron (8 RF-4E, 14 RF-5A, 12 C-130)
  - 12th Squadron (24 F-4E, 16 C-130)
  - 13th Squadron (24 F-4E, 6 Boeing 707, 8 KC-135, 11 Boeing 747)
  - 14th Squadron (1 Falcon F-50, 3 Falcon F-20, 2 Jet Star)
  - 15th Squadron (18 Fokker F-27)
- 2nd Wing (Tabriz)
  - 21st Squadron (20 F-5E)
  - 22nd Squadron (20 F-5E/F)
  - 23rd Squadron (20 F-5E/F)
- 3rd Wing (Hamadan-Nojeh)
  - 31st Squadron (16 F-4E, 8 RF-4E)
  - 32nd Squadron (16 F-4E)
  - 33rd Squadron (16 F-4E)
- 4th Wing (Dezful-Vahdati)
  - 41st Squadron (20 F-5E/F)
  - 42nd Squadron (20 F-5E/F)
  - 43rd Squadron (20 F-5E/F)
- 6th Wing (Bushehr)
  - 61st Squadron (20 F-4E)
  - 62nd Squadron (20 F-4E, 4 RF-4E)
- 7th Wing (Shiraz)
  - 71st Squadron (16 F-4D, 14 C-130)
  - 72nd Squadron (19 F-14A, 14 C-130)
  - 73rd Squadron (19 F-14A)
- 8th Wing (Esfahan)
  - 81st Squadron (20 F-14A)
  - 82nd Squadron (19 F-14A)
- 9th Wing (Bandar Abbas)
  - 91st Squadron (12 F-4E)
  - 92nd Squadron (6 P-3F Orion)
- 10th Wing (Chah Bahar-Kangan)
  - 101st Squadron (14 F-4D)
  - 102nd Squadron (16 F-5E/F)

=== Iranian Navy ===
At Bandar Abbas

- 3 Destroyers - Babar, Palang (Allen M. Sumner-Class), Damavand (Battle-Class)
- 4 Missile Frigates - Alvand, Alborz, Sabalan, Sahand (Alvand-Class)
- 5 Amphibious Vessels - Hengam, Larak, Lavan, Tonb (Hengam-Class), Iran Ajr
- 5 Minesweepers
- 2 Patrol Boats
- 4 Cargo Ships
- 3 Oil Tankers
- 2 Logistics Vessels
- 2 Naval Infantry Battalions

At Bushehr

- 4 Corvettes - Bayandor, Naghdi, Milanian, Kahnamoie (Bayandor-Class)
- 6 Missile Boats - Kaman, Khadang, Falakhon, Shamshir, Gorz, Gardouneh (Kaman Class)
- 2 Patrol Boats
- 8 Hydroplanes
- 1 Logistics Vessel

At Kharg

- 3 Missile Boats - Zoubin, Paykan, Joshan (Kaman Class)
- 1 Patrol Boat
- 3 Hydroplanes
- 1 Naval Infantry Detachment

At Khorramshar

- 2 Patrol Boats
- 3 Hydroplanes
- 1 Naval Infantry Battalion

=== Revolutionary Guards (Pasdaran) ===
Ground Forces of the Islamic Revolutionary Guard Corps

- 8th Najaf Ashraf Division (Najafabad County, Isfahan)
- 14th Imam Hossein Division (Isfahan)
- 17th Ali ibn Abi Taleb Division (Qom)
- 25th Karbala Division (Mazandaran)
- 27th Mohammad Rasulullah Division (Tehran)
- 31st Ashura Division (East Azarbaijan, West Azarbaijan, Ardabil)
- 33rd Al-Mahdi Brigade (Fars)
- 41st Tharallah Division (Kerman)
- unnamed others

=== Other forces ===
Iran was supported by the Iraqi Shia rebels and Lebanese Hezbollah. Shia volunteer fighters also came from Afghanistan, Pakistan, India, Kuwait, Bahrain and Iraq to help Iran during the war.

== Sources ==
- Tom Cooper & Farzad Bishop, with additional details from N. R., I Persian Gulf War: Iraqi Invasion of Iran, September 1980, Sep 9, 2003, 06:33, Air Combat Information Group
- Razoux, Pierre, The Iran-Iraq War, Harvard University Press, 2015, ISBN 978-0-674-08863-4.
