= List of ship commissionings in 1978 =

The list of ship commissionings in 1978 includes a chronological list of all ships commissioned in 1978.

	Operator	Ship	Flag	Class and type	Pennant	Other notes
9 January	Birka Line	Prinsessan	Finland	Ferry		Former Finnhansa with Finnlines
16 January	Sessan Linjen	Fennia	Finland	Ferry		Chartered from Svea Line (Finland)
February	Kefalliniki Sa	Ainos	Greece	Ferry		Ex-Manic with La Traverse Nord-Sud Ltd
4 March	United States Navy	Oldendorf		Spruance-class destroyer	DD-972	
11 March	United States Navy	Merrill		Spruance-class destroyer	DD-976	
11 March	United States Navy	Cincinnati		Los Angeles-class submarine	SSN-693	
15 March	Imperial Iranian Navy	Khadang		Kaman-class fast attack craft	P223	
23 March	Imperial Iranian Navy	Joshan		Kaman-class fast attack craft	P225	
31 March	Imperial Iranian Navy	Paykan		Kaman-class fast attack craft	P224	
31 March	Imperial Iranian Navy	Falakhon		Kaman-class fast attack craft	P226	
31 March	Imperial Iranian Navy	Shamshir		Kaman-class fast attack craft	P227	
3 April	Minoan Lines	Knossos	Greece	Ferry		Former Saga with Swedish Lloyd
24 April	Svea Line (Finland)	Fennia	Finland	Ferry		In Silja Line traffic
10 May	Polferries	Rogalin	Poland	Ferry		Ex-Aallotar chartered by Polferries from Effoa
13 May	DFDS Seaways	Dana Anglia	Denmark	Ferry		
20 May	United States Navy	John Young		Spruance-class destroyer	DD-973	
3 June	United States Navy	Briscoe		Spruance-class destroyer	DD-977	
9 June	P&O Normandy Ferries	nf Tiger	United Kingdom	Ferry		Ex-Katteget with Jydsk Færgefart A/S
5 August	United States Navy	Mississippi		Virginia-class cruiser	CGN-40	
5 August	United States Navy	Comte de Grasse		Spruance-class destroyer	DD-974	
19 August	United States Navy	Stump		Spruance-class destroyer	DD-978	
22 August	Imperial Iranian Navy	Gorz		Kaman-class fast attack craft	P228	
1 September	Stena Line	Stena Oceanica	Sweden	Ferry		Former Patricia with Swedish Lloyd. Heavily rebuilt before entered service.
26 October	Royal Netherlands Navy	Kortenaer		Kortenaer-class frigate	F807	
11 September	Imperial Iranian Navy	Gardouneh		Kaman-class fast attack craft	P229	
23 September	United States Navy	Belleau Wood		Tarawa-class amphibious assault ship	LHA-3	
14 October	United States Navy	Conolly		Spruance-class destroyer	DD-979	
21 October	United States Navy	Arkansas		Virginia-class cruiser	CGN-41	
9 November	Stena Line	Stena Baltica	Sweden	Ferry		Former Peer Günt with Aarhus-Oslo Linie
16 December	United States Navy	Moosbrugger		Spruance-class destroyer	DD-980	
