= RIM-67 Standard =

RIM-67 Standard ER
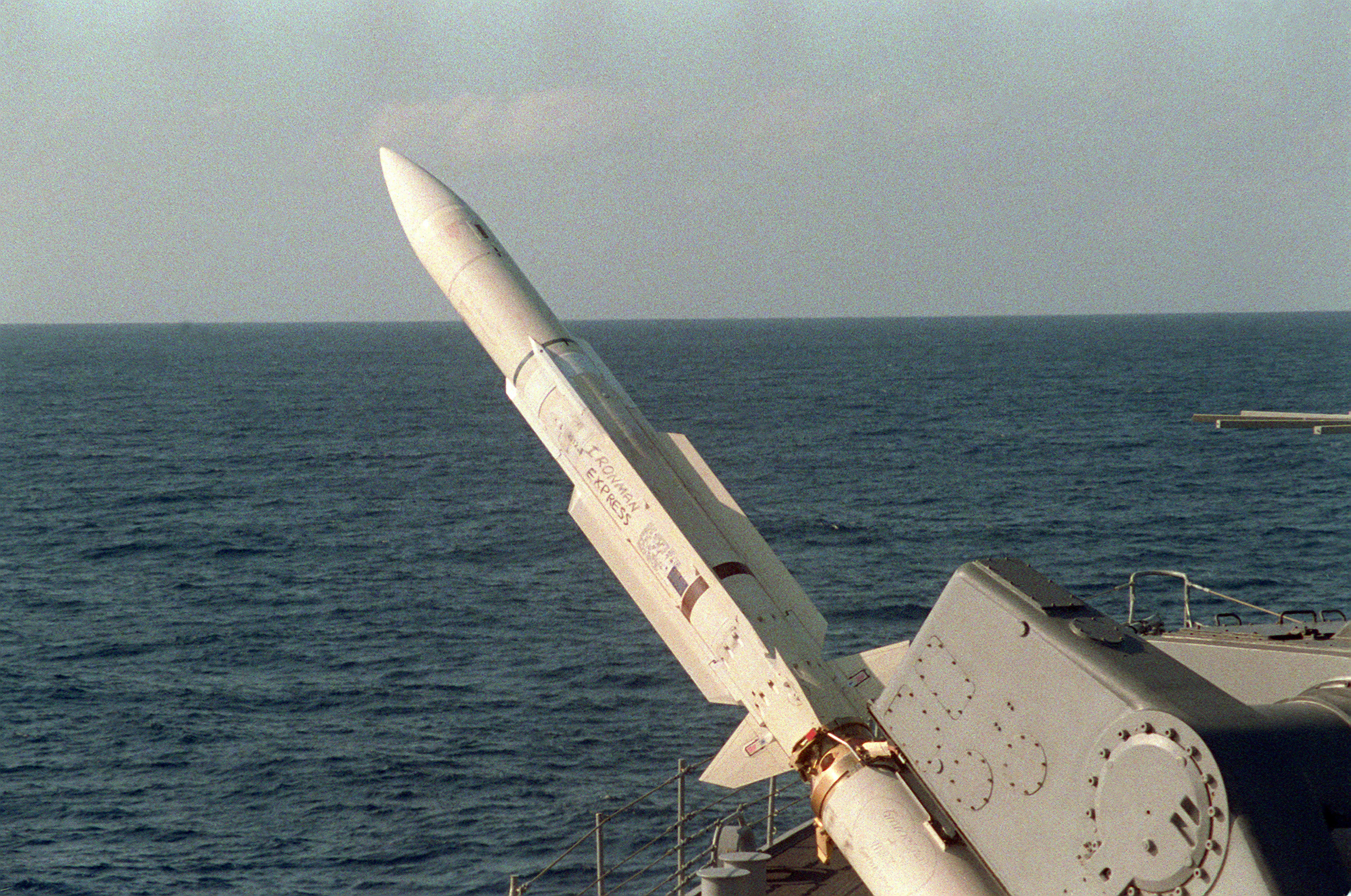
- Type: Extended range surface-to-air missile with anti-ship capability
- Place of origin: United States

Service history
- In service: 1981–present (RIM-67B), 1999–present (RIM-156A)

Production history
- Manufacturer: Raytheon Missiles & Defense
- Unit cost: $409,000

Specifications
- Mass: 2,980 lb (1,350 kg); SM-2ER Block IV: 3,225 lb (1,463 kg)
- Length: 26.2 ft (8.0 m); SM-2ER Block IV: 21 ft 6 in (6.55 m) with booster
- Diameter: SM-2ER Block IV: Main body: 13.5 in (34.3 cm); Booster: 21 in (53.3 cm)
- Wingspan: 5 ft 2 in (1.57 m); SM-2ER Block IV: 3 ft 6 in (1.07 m)
- Warhead: Radar proximity and contact fuse, high explosive 137 lb (62 kg) continuous rod, later blast fragmentation
- Engine: Two-stage, solid-fuel rocket; sustainer motor and booster motor
- Operational range: 65–100 nmi (120–185 km); SM-2ER Block IV: 100–200 nmi (190–370 km)
- Flight ceiling: 80,200 ft (24,400 m)
- Maximum speed: Mach 3.5
- Guidance system: Inertial/SARH
- Launch platform: Surface ship

The RIM-67 Standard ER (SM-1ER/SM-2ER) is an extended range surface-to-air missile (SAM) with a secondary anti-ship capability, developed for the United States Navy (USN) by Raytheon. The RIM-67 was developed from the RIM-66 Standard as replacement for the RIM-8 Talos long-range and RIM-2 Terrier medium-range missiles, which were 1950s systems deployed on a variety of USN ships. The RIM-66 Standard MR was essentially the same missile without a booster stage designed to replace the RIM-24 Tartar, another early medium-range missile. The RIM-66/67 series thus became the US Navy's universal SAM system, hence the designation "Standard Missile".

== RIM-67A SM-1 Extended Range ==
The RIM-67A (SM-1ER Block I) was the Navy's replacement for RIM-8 Talos missile. Improved technology allowed the RIM-67 to be reduced to the size of the earlier RIM-2 Terrier missile. Existing ships with the Mk86 guided missile fire control system, or "Terrier" were adapted to employ the new missile in place of the older RIM-2 Terrier missile. Ships that switched from the RIM-2 Terrier to the RIM-67A were still referred to as Terrier ships even though they were equipped with the newer missile.

== RIM-67B and RIM-156 SM-2 Extended Range ==
The second generation of Standard missile, the Standard Missile 2, was developed for the Aegis Combat System and for the New Threat Upgrade (NTU) program for existing Terrier and Tartar ships. It is the primary anti-air weapon of the US Navy.

The destroyer USS Mahan served as the test platform for the development of the CG/SM-2 (ER) missile program project. The principal change over the Standard Missile 1 is the introduction of inertial guidance until the terminal phase where semi-active homing takes over.

Terrier ships re-equipped as part of the New Threat Upgrade were refit to use the RIM-67B (SM-2ER Block I) missile.

The RIM-156A Standard SM-2ER Block IV with the Mk 72 booster was developed to provide a long range SAM for the Ticonderoga class of Aegis cruisers. The Mk 72 booster allows the RIM-156A to fit into the Mark 41 Vertical Launching System. This configuration is also be used for terminal phase ballistic missile defense.

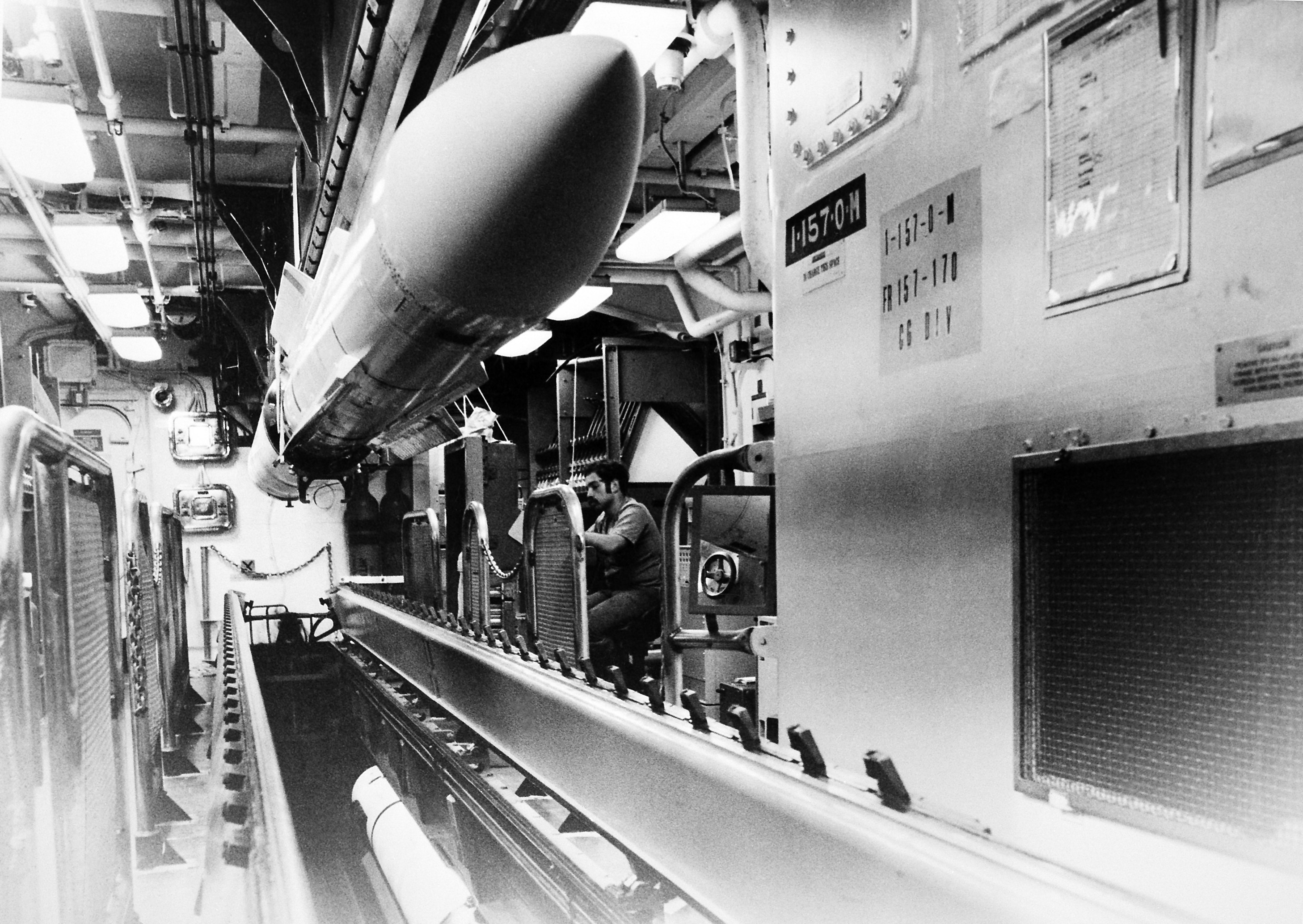
An SM-2ER on the rail inside USS Mahan.

There was a plan to build a nuclear armed standard missile mounting a W81 nuclear warhead as a replacement for the earlier Nuclear Terrier missile (RIM-2D). The USN rescinded the requirement for the nuclear armed missile in the 1980s, and the project was canceled.

The Standard can also be used against ships, either at line-of-sight range using its semi-active homing mode, or over the horizon using inertial guidance and terminal infrared homing.

The RIM-174 SM-6 ERAM is a new generation of Standard extended range missiles which became operational in 2013 designed to supplement the SM-2.

As of April 2025, the Navy is considering phasing out the SM-2 series and replacing them with the PAC-3 MSE variant of the MIM-104 Patriot missile system, which can be fired from the same VLS systems but is available in greater numbers, can be produced faster, requires fewer interceptors fired to achieve a kill, and has sufficient maneuverability to engage surface-skimming targets as close as 1 km away from the launch vessel – a part of the engagement envelope that the SM-6, which must first boost to high altitudes and dive on a target, cannot engage in as it requires a greater minimum distance.

== Operational history ==
During the Iran–Iraq War (1980–1988) the United States deployed Standard missiles to protect its navy, as well as other ships in the Persian Gulf from the threat of Iranian attacks. According to the Iranian Air Force, its F-4 Phantom IIs were engaged by SM-2ERs but managed to evade them, with one aircraft sustaining non-fatal damage due to shrapnel. During the same war the United States Navy mistakenly shot down an Iranian civilian airliner, Iran Air Flight 655, using two SM-2 missiles.

On April 18, 1988, during Operation Praying Mantis, the frigate USS Simpson fired four RIM-66 Standard missiles and the cruiser USS Wainwright fired two RIM-67 Standard missiles at Joshan, an Iranian Kaman-class (La Combattante II type) missile boat. The attacks destroyed the Iranian ship's superstructure but did not sink it.

=== Deployment ===
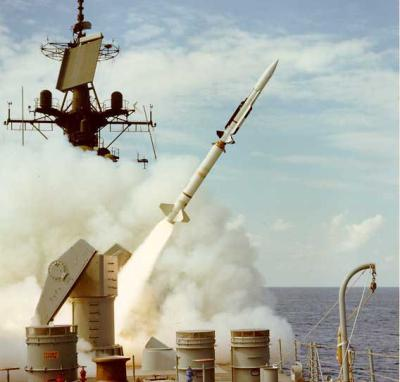
RIM-67A Launching

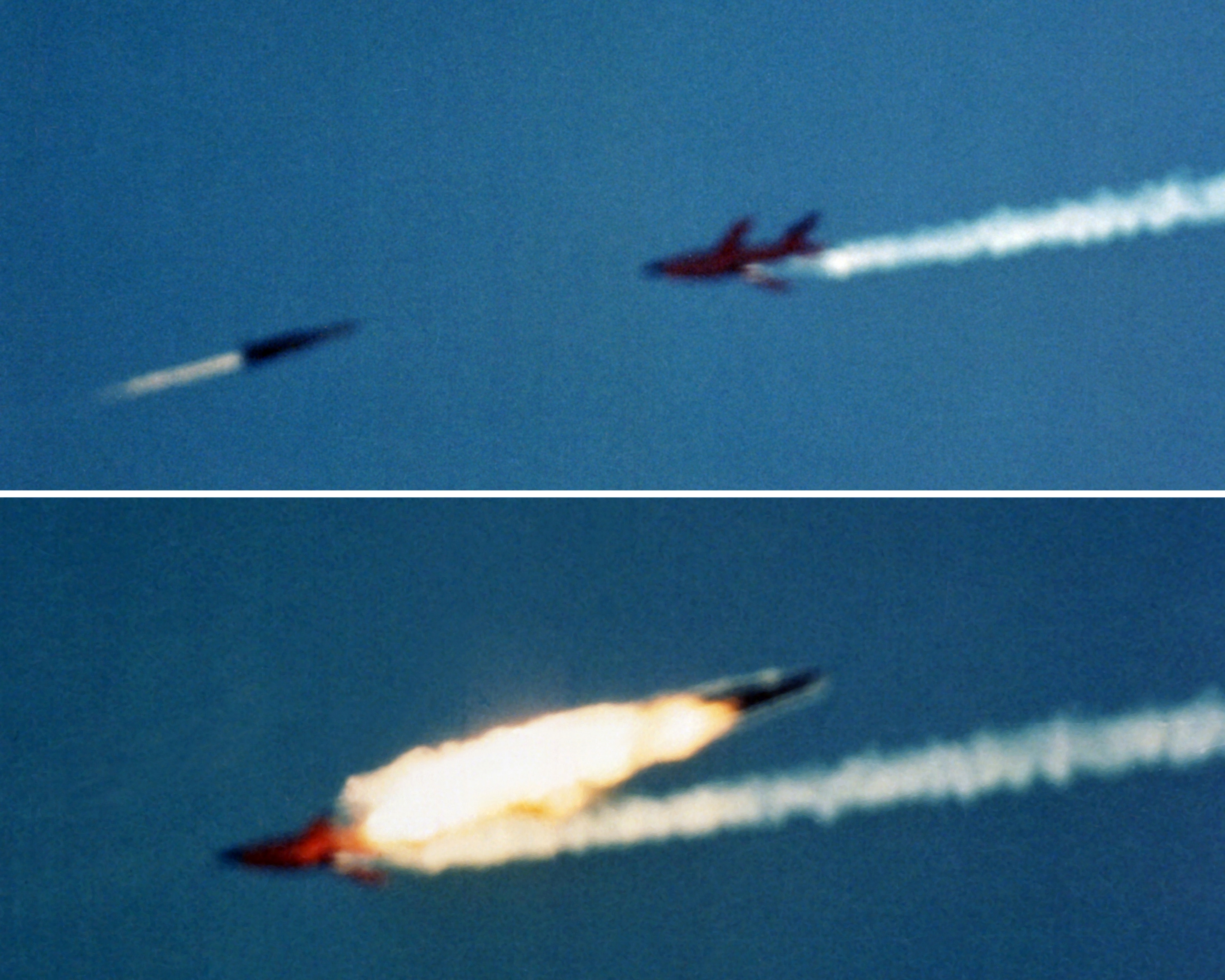
RIM-67 intercepting Firebee drone in 1980 test.

RIM-67 Standard was deployed on ships of the following classes, replacing the RIM-2 Terrier, and it never was VLS-capable. All of the ships used the AN/SPG-55 for guidance. The Mk10 guided missile launching system was used as the launching system. New Threat Upgrade equipped vessels operated the RIM-67B which used inertial guidance for every phase of the intercept except for the terminal phase where the AN/SPG-55 radar illuminates the target.

- USS Long Beach SM-1ER later SM-2ER with NTU.
- Farragut-class destroyers SM-1ER later SM-2ER with NTU.
- Leahy-class cruisers SM-1ER later SM-2ER with NTU.
- USS Bainbridge SM-1ER later SM-2ER with NTU.
- Belknap-class cruisers SM-1ER later SM-2ER with NTU.
- USS Truxtun SM-1ER later SM-2ER with NTU.
- USS America SM-1ER.
- Italian cruiser Vittorio Veneto SM-1ER Only.

The RIM-156 Standard Block IV, is a version that has been developed for the Aegis Combat System it has a smaller compact sized booster stage for firing from the Mk41 Vertical Launching System. Like the earlier RIM-67B it employs inertial/command guidance with terminal semi-active homing.

- Ticonderoga-class cruisers (VLS units only)
- Arleigh Burke-class destroyers

== Variants ==
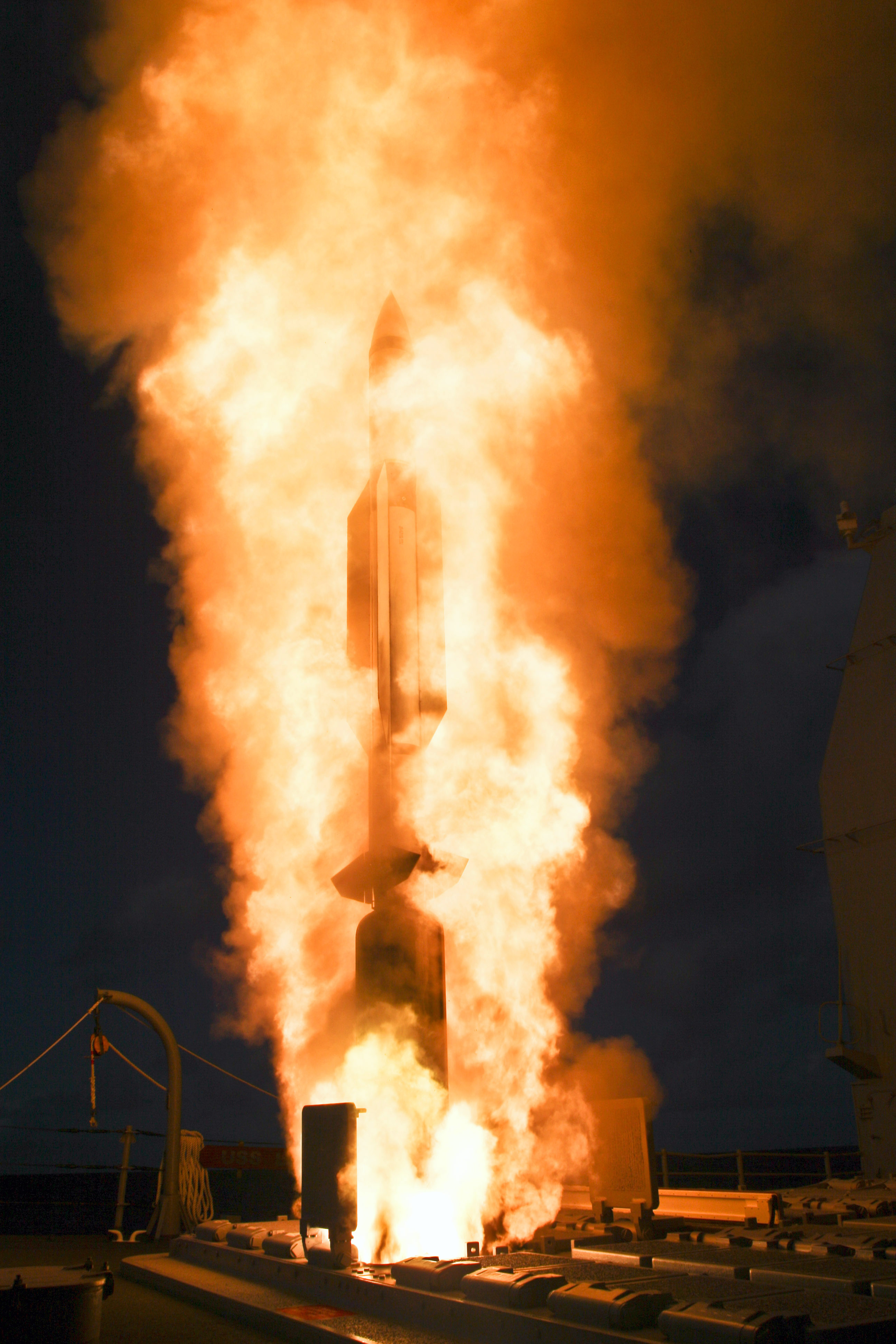
A RIM-156A (VLS version of the RIM-67) launching from a VLS cell on USS Lake Erie in 2008.

Designation	Block	Notes
RIM-67A	SM-1ER Block I	Terrier Upgrade: Essentially identical to the corresponding SM-1MR missile, except for the propulsion; Atlantic Research Corp. MK 30 solid-fuel rocket sustainer motor; Hercules MK 12 booster; MK 51 continuous-rod warhead
RIM-67B	SM-2ER Block I	New Threat Upgrade. Entered service in 1980.: Inertial Guidance System; Monopulse seeker for terminal homing
RIM-67C	SM-2ER Block II	New Threat Upgrade: Introduced Hercules MK 70 booster, almost doubling the effective range; MK 115 blast-fragmentation warhead
RIM-67D	SM-2ER Block III	New Threat Upgrade: MK 30 MOD 4 sustainer engine; MK 45 MOD 8 proximity fuze (also known as TDD – Target Detection Device)
RIM-156A (ex-RIM-67E)	SM-2ER Block IV	Designed for Aegis VLS ships. Initial Operational Capability was declared in August 1999.: Finless MK 72 booster that uses thrust-vectoring control; MK 45 MOD 10 TDD, for improved performance against high-performance, low-RCS threats; Guidance and control modifications for better performance in severe ECM environments; A developmental step toward the Navy Area Theater Ballistic Missile Defense (NATBMD) missile
RIM-156B	SM-2ER Block IVA	Designed for modified Aegis VLS ships capable of tracking both TBM's and aircraft.: Dual-mode RF/IIR (Radio Frequency/Imaging Infrared) seeker; Upgraded MK 125 warhead package; Enhanced autopilot for the anti-TBM mission; canceled as a part of the whole NATBMD program in December 2001.

== Gallery ==
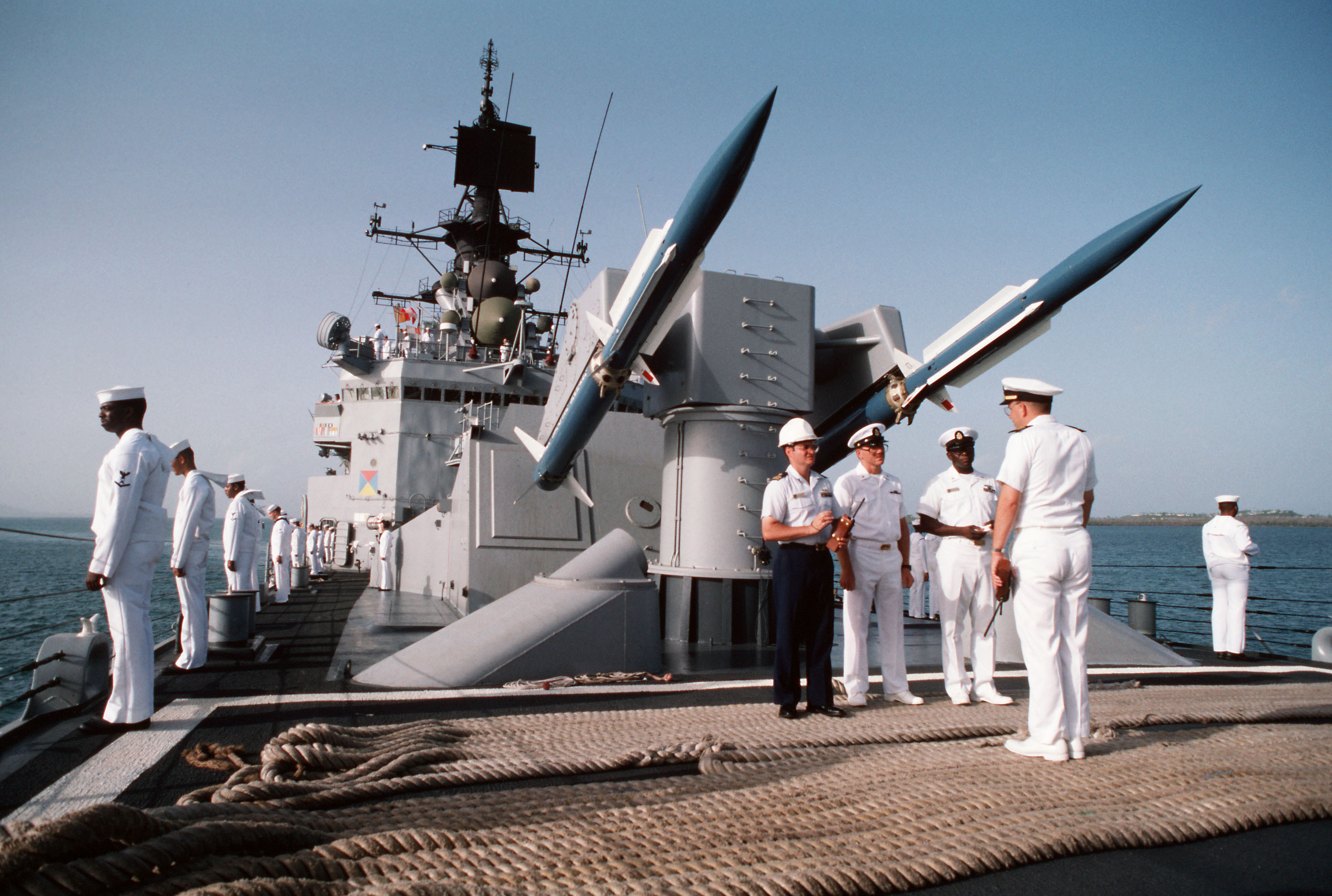
Blue training missiles on the rails of a MK-10 GMLS on USS Josephus Daniels

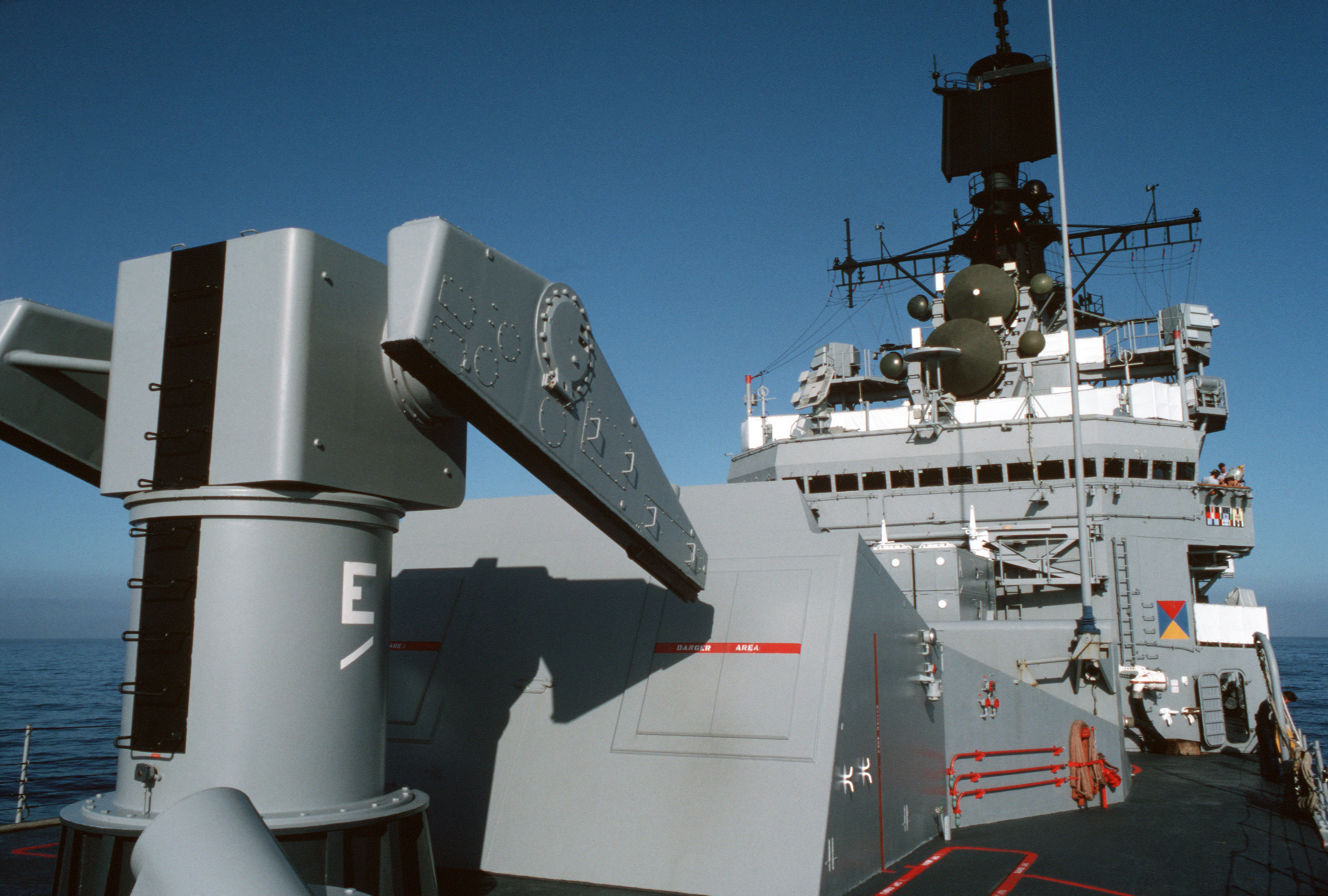
USS Worden showing the Mk 10 GMLS. Note the launcher at left, the blast doors behind launcher where the missiles exit the launcher feeder and AN/SPG-55 radars at middle right.

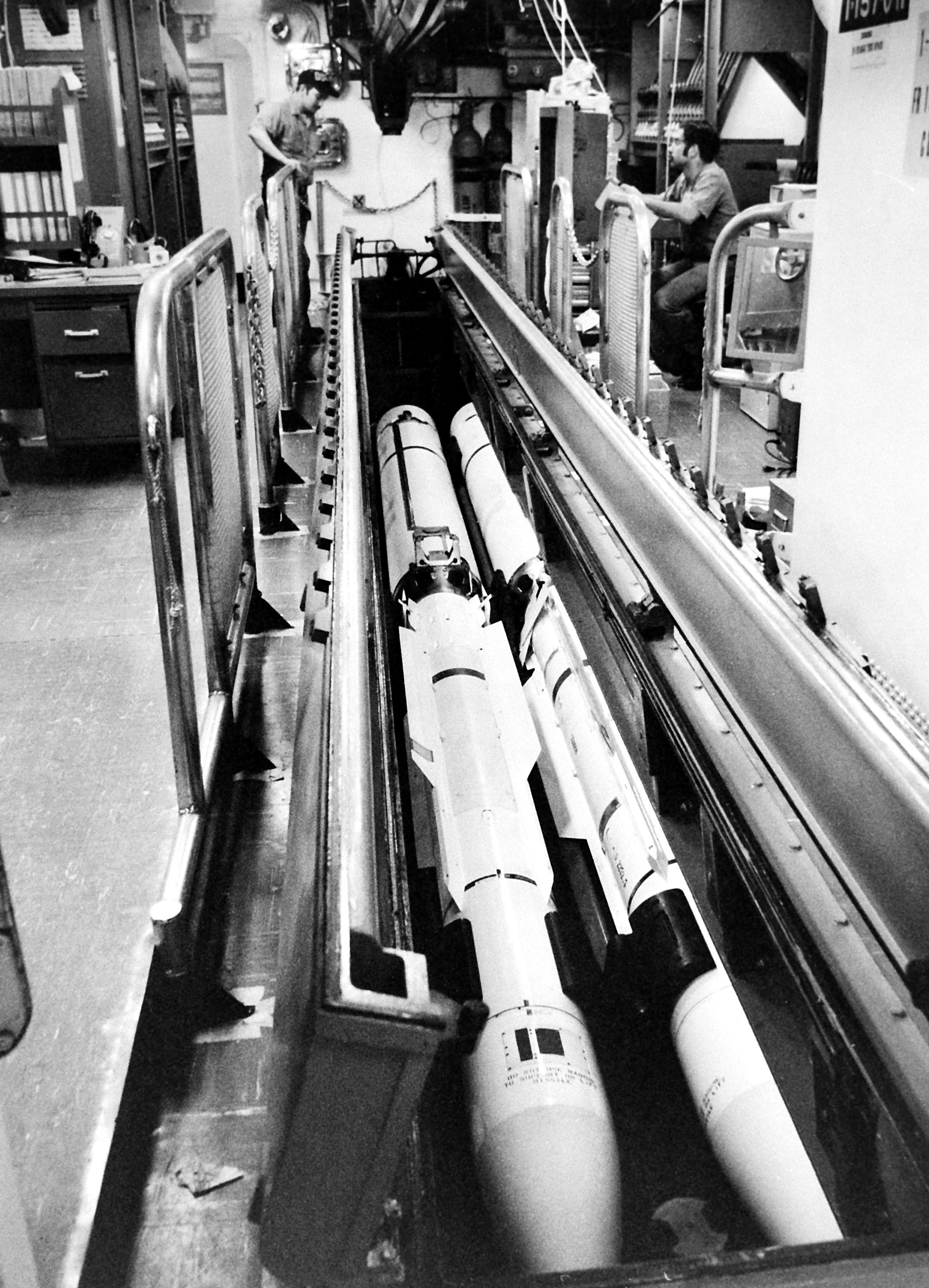
An SM-2ER in the magazine area, on a ready service ring of the Mk-10 GMLS on Mahan

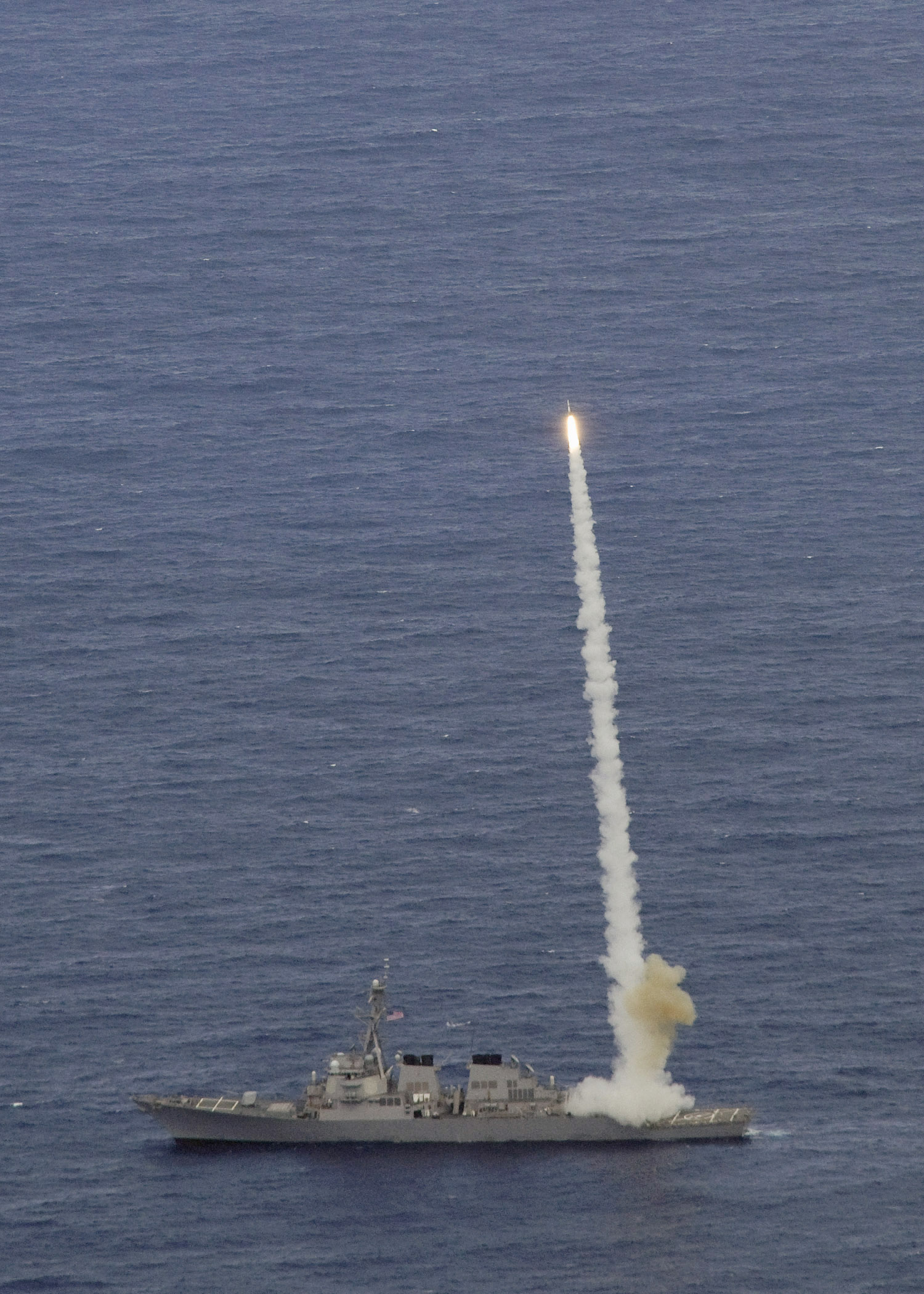
The guided-missile destroyer USS Curtis Wilbur launches a RIM-156 Standard SM-2 ER missile while conducting torpedo evasion maneuvers during Multi-Sail 2009

== See also ==
- RIM-2 Terrier – predecessor
- RIM-8 Talos – predecessor
- RIM-24 Tartar
- AGM-78 Standard ARM
- RIM-66 Standard Medium Range
- RIM-161 Standard SM-3
- RIM-174 Standard ERAM – successor
