= IRIS Zoubin =

Iranian naval vessel

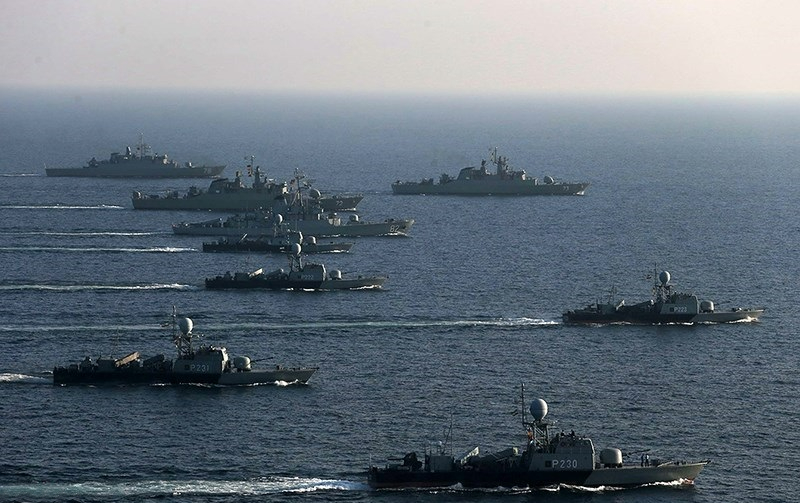
- IRIS Zoubin (fourth ship from the bottom) on exercise in the Strait of Hormuz in 2018

History

Iran
- Name: Zoubin
- Namesake: Zoubin
- Operator: Islamic Republic of Iran Navy
- Ordered: 19 February 1974
- Builder: Constructions de Mécaniques, Cherbourg
- Laid down: 4 April 1975
- Launched: 14 April 1976
- Commissioned: 12 September 1977
- Identification: P222
- Status: In service

General characteristics (as built)
- Class & type: Kaman-class fast attack craft
- Displacement: 249 tons standard; 275 tons full load
- Length: 47 m (154 ft 2 in)
- Beam: 7.1 m (23 ft 4 in)
- Draft: 1.9 m (6 ft 3 in)
- Installed power: 4 × MTU 16V538 TB91 diesels, 14,400 brake horsepower (10.7 MW)
- Propulsion: 4 × shafts
- Speed: 36 knots (67 km/h)
- Range: 2,000 miles (3,200 km) at 15 knots (28 km/h); 700 miles (1,100 km) at 33.7 knots (62.4 km/h)
- Complement: 30
- Armament: 4 × Harpoon (single cell); 1 × 76mm/65 (single compact); 1 × 40mm/70 Bofors gun
- Notes: As reported by Jane's (1979)

Zoubin (Persian: زوبین, lit. 'Javelin') is a Kaman-class fast attack craft in the Southern Fleet of the Islamic Republic of Iran Navy.

== Construction and commissioning ==
Zoubin was built by the French company Constructions Mécaniques de Normandie at Cherbourg, as one of the first six contracted on 19 February 1974. Her keel was laid down on 4 April 1975 and on 14 April 1976, she was launched. Falakhon was commissioned into the fleet on 12 September 1977.

== Service history ==
During Iran-Iraq War, her home port was Kharg Naval Base. She was one of the three vessels in her class, along with Paykan and Joshan that participated in Operation Morvarid against Iraqi Osa-class missile boats.

== See also ==
- List of current ships of the Islamic Republic of Iran Navy
- List of military equipment manufactured in Iran
