= Mahmoud Eskandari =

Iranian Pilot colonel

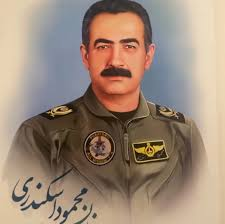
- Born: 1947; Karaj, Iran
- Died: 2001 (aged 53–54)
- Allegiance: The Imperial Iranian Air Force IIAF, then Islamic Republic of Iran Air Force IRIAF
- Branch: The Imperial Iranian Air Force IIAF, then Islamic Republic of Iran Air Force
- Rank: Lieutenant colonel
- Conflicts: Iran–Iraq War

Mahmoud Eskandari (Persian: محمود اسکندری; 1947–2001) was a Fighter aircraft pilot of the F-4 Phantom ll for IIAF and IRIAF.

== Military background ==
He served as an F-4E Phantom II pilot during the Iran–Iraq War and participated in several major air operations. He was involved in missions related to the liberation of Khorramshahr, the H-3 airstrike, and operations targeting Baghdad. He has been described in some sources as the “Man of the Impossible Missions” for his role in high-risk combat sorties.

During Baghdad operation, Eskandari managed to repeatedly pass through the firewall that was protecting Baghdad and return to Iran despite multiple damages to his airplane and severe, threatening injuries to him and his RIO, following the crash of Abbas Doran due to a SAM strike.

== Operations ==
- H-3 airstrike (April 6, 1981)
- Flying a F4E Phantom ll from Syria back to Iran, straight through Iraqi territory where Iraqi fighter jets were waiting for him at the borders with Turkey and then Iran. Instead, he flew straight through Iraq at a very low-altitude and at supersonic speed.
- Liberation of Khorramshahr (May 6, 1982) with his high-precision, successful bombing of a strategic bridge that other pilots had failed to hit.
- Battle of Khorramshahr (1982) (July 1982)
