= Southern Fleet (Iran) =

Southern Forward Naval Headquarters
- Location of current southern fleet bases
- Country: Iran
- Part of: Islamic Republic of Iran Navy
- Garrison/HQ: Bandar Abbas, Hormozgan Province
- Engagements: Anglo-Persian capture of Ormuz (1622); Afsharid Conquests in the Persian Gulf & Oman (1730s–1747); British invasion of Iran (1941); Iran–Iraq War (1980–1988); 2026 Iran War

Commanders
- Current commander: Vice Commodore Afshin Tashak

The Southern Fleet, which is under command of the Southern Forward Naval Headquarters (SNFHQ; Persian: قرارگاه مقدم ناوگان جنوب), compromises the 1st, the 2nd and the 3rd naval regions of the Islamic Republic of Iran Navy. The SNFHQ is based in Bandar Abbas, and is responsible for coordination across its three southern districts as a forward operating base, as well as presence of units in international missions off Iranian territorial waters.

== Structure ==
The jurisdiction and responsibilities of the navy was redefined in 2007, as a result, the southern fleet was reorganized.

=== Before 2007 ===
Prior to these changes, the organization of the southern fleet was as follows:

Region	Headquarters	Area of responsibility
1st Naval Region	Bandar Abbas, Hormozgan	Strait of Hormuz
2nd Naval Region	Bushehr, Bushehr	central Persian Gulf
3rd Naval Region	Mahshahr, Khuzestan	northern Persian Gulf
Chabahar Naval Base (independent)	Chabahar, Sistan and Baluchestan	Gulf of Oman

=== Since 2007 ===
The forces under command of the southern fleet currently operate under these districts:

Region	Namesake	Headquarters	Area of responsibility
1st Naval Region	Emamat	Bandar Abbas, Hormozgan	Strait of Hormuz
2nd Naval Region	Velayat	Jask, Hormozgan	western Gulf of Oman
3rd Naval Region	Nabovat	Konarak, Sistan and Baluchestan	eastern Gulf of Oman

== Commanders ==
- Commodore Abbas Ramzi Ataie
- Rear Admiral Kamal Habibollahi (October 1972–January 1976)
- Captain Mohammad-Hossein Malekzadegan (1983–1985)
- Commodore Ebrahim Ashkan (?–2017)
- Vice Commodore Afshin Tashak (2017–present)

== Order of battle ==
=== Submarines ===
- Kilo-class submarine
  - Taregh (reported out of water as of January 2021)
  - Nooh (reported out of water as of January 2021)
  - Yunes (reported out of water as of January 2021)
- Ghadir-class submarines (about 20 were believed to be operational as of 2020)
- Nahang (rarely seen on operation)

=== Surface combatants ===
- Alvand-class frigate
  - Alvand (sunk during 2026 Iran war)
  - Alborz (in dry dock as of 2026)
  - Sabalan (sunk during 2026 Iran war)
- Moudge-class frigate (formerly)
  - Jamaran (sunk during 2026 Iran war)
- Kaman-class fast attack craft
  - Kaman (active as of 2020)
  - Zoubin (active as of 2020)
  - Khadang (active as of 2020)
  - Falakhon (active as of 2020)
  - Shamshir (active as of 2020)
  - Gorz (active as of 2020)
  - Gardouneh (active as of 2020)
  - Khanjar (active as of 2020)
  - Tabarzin (active as of 2020)
- Sina-class fast attack craft
  - Zereh
