= IRIS Paykan =

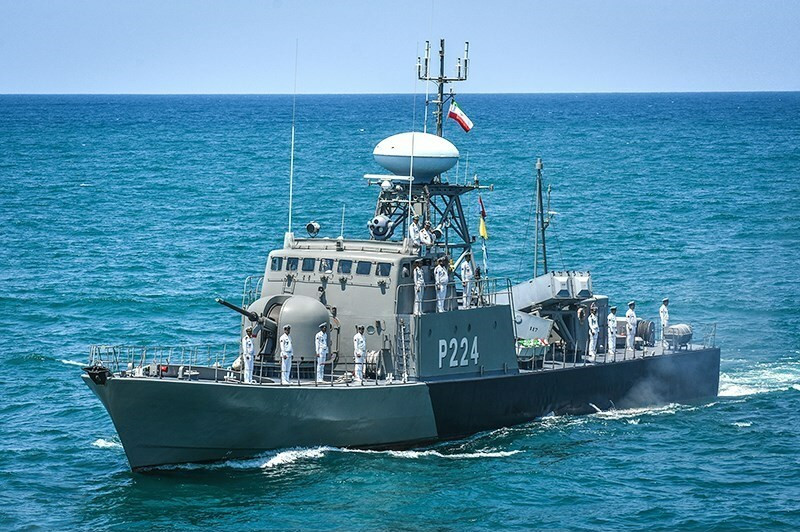
IRIS Paykan

Two ships of the Iranian Navy have borne the name Paykan

- Iranian missile boat Paykan (1977), a French-made Kaman-class missile boat sunk during Operation Morvarid in 1980
- Iranian missile boat Paykan (2003), a Sina-class missile boat
