= IRIS Khadang =

1978 Iranian fast attack craft

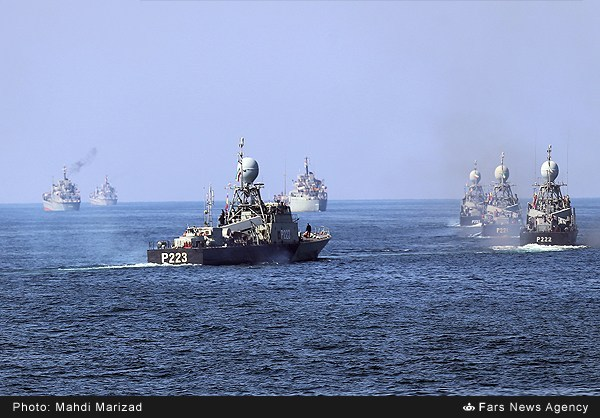

History

Iran
- Name: Khadang
- Namesake: Khadang
- Operator: Islamic Republic of Iran Navy
- Ordered: 19 February 1974
- Builder: Constructions de Mécaniques, Cherbourg
- Laid down: 20 June 1975
- Launched: 15 July 1976
- Commissioned: 15 March 1978
- Status: In service

General characteristics (as built)
- Class & type: Kaman-class fast attack craft
- Displacement: 249 tons standard; 275 tons full load
- Length: 47 m (154 ft 2 in)
- Beam: 7.1 m (23 ft 4 in)
- Draft: 1.9 m (6 ft 3 in)
- Installed power: 4 × MTU 16V538 TB91 diesels, 14,400 brake horsepower (10.7 MW)
- Propulsion: 4 × shafts
- Speed: 36 knots (67 km/h)
- Range: 2,000 miles (3,200 km) at 15 knots (28 km/h); 700 miles (1,100 km) at 33.7 knots (62.4 km/h)
- Complement: 30
- Armament: 4 × Harpoon (single cell); 1 × 76mm/65 (single compact); 1 × 40mm/70 Bofors gun
- Notes: As reported by Jane's (1979)

Khadang (Persian: خدنگ, lit. 'Arrowhead') is a Kaman-class fast attack craft in the Southern Fleet of the Islamic Republic of Iran Navy.

== Construction and commissioning ==
Khadang was built by the French company Constructions Mécaniques de Normandie at Cherbourg, as one of the first six contracted on 19 February 1974. Her keel was laid down on 20 June 1975 and on 15 July 1976, she was launched. Falakhon was commissioned into the fleet on 15 March 1978.

== Service history ==
During Iran–Iraq War, her home port was Bushehr Naval Base.

== See also ==
- List of current ships of the Islamic Republic of Iran Navy
- List of military equipment manufactured in Iran
