= IRIS Kaman =

Fast attack craft in the Iranian navy

History

Iran
- Name: Kaman
- Namesake: Kaman
- Operator: Islamic Republic of Iran Navy
- Ordered: 19 February 1974
- Builder: Constructions de Mécaniques, Cherbourg
- Laid down: 5 February 1975
- Launched: 8 January 1976
- Commissioned: 12 August 1977
- Status: In service

General characteristics (as built)
- Class & type: Kaman-class fast attack craft
- Displacement: 249 tons standard; 275 tons full load
- Length: 47 m (154 ft 2 in)
- Beam: 7.1 m (23 ft 4 in)
- Draft: 1.9 m (6 ft 3 in)
- Installed power: 4 × MTU 16V538 TB91 diesels, 14,400 brake horsepower (10.7 MW)
- Propulsion: 4 × shafts
- Speed: 36 knots (67 km/h)
- Range: 2,000 miles (3,200 km) at 15 knots (28 km/h); 700 miles (1,100 km) at 33.7 knots (62.4 km/h)
- Complement: 30
- Armament: 4 × Harpoon (single cell); 1 × 76mm/65 (single compact); 1 × 40mm/70 Bofors gun
- Notes: As reported by Jane's (1979)

Kaman (Persian: کمان, lit. 'Bow') is a fast attack craft in the Southern Fleet of the Islamic Republic of Iran Navy and the lead ship of her class.

== Construction and commissioning ==
Kaman was built by French Constructions Mécaniques de Normandie at Cherbourg, as one of the first six contracted on 19 February 1974. Her keel was laid down on 5 February 1975 and on 8 January 1976, she was launched. Falakhon was commissioned into the fleet on 12 August 1977.

== Service history ==
During the Iran–Iraq War, her home port was Bushehr Naval Base.

== See also ==
- List of current ships of the Islamic Republic of Iran Navy
- List of military equipment manufactured in Iran
