= HydroQuest =

French company developing river and tidal current turbines

HydroQuest SAS
- Industry: Renewable energy
- Founded: 2010; 16 years ago in Grenoble, France
- Headquarters: Meylan, France
- Key people: Thomas Jaquier (CEO)
- Products: Tidal turbines
- Website: hydroquest.fr/en/

HydroQuest SAS is a French developer of vertical-axis turbines that generate electricity from tidal stream currents. Founded in 2010 in Meylan, Grenoble, the company is based in the Inovallée science park.

HydroQuest has installed several small in-river turbines in France and French Guiana and tested a 1 MW tidal stream turbine off the coast of Brittany between 2019 and 2021. Together with partners, the company is developing the 17 MW FloWatt project, which will consist of six tidal stream turbines. The pilot farm is expected to be commissioned in 2028.

== Device concept ==
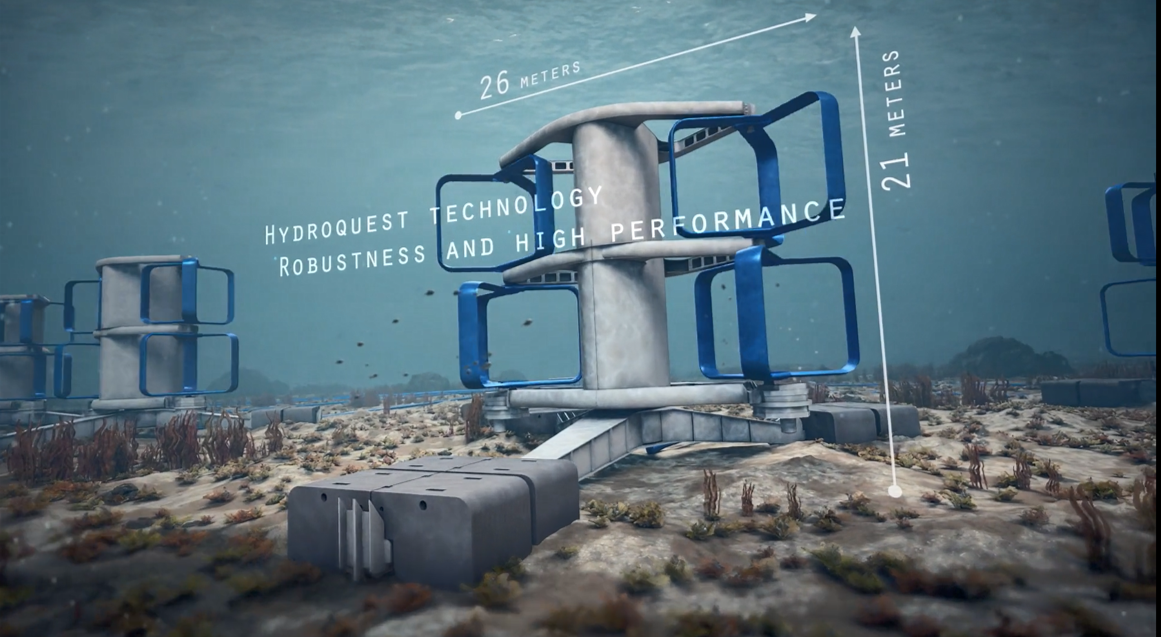
HydroQuest turbines under water

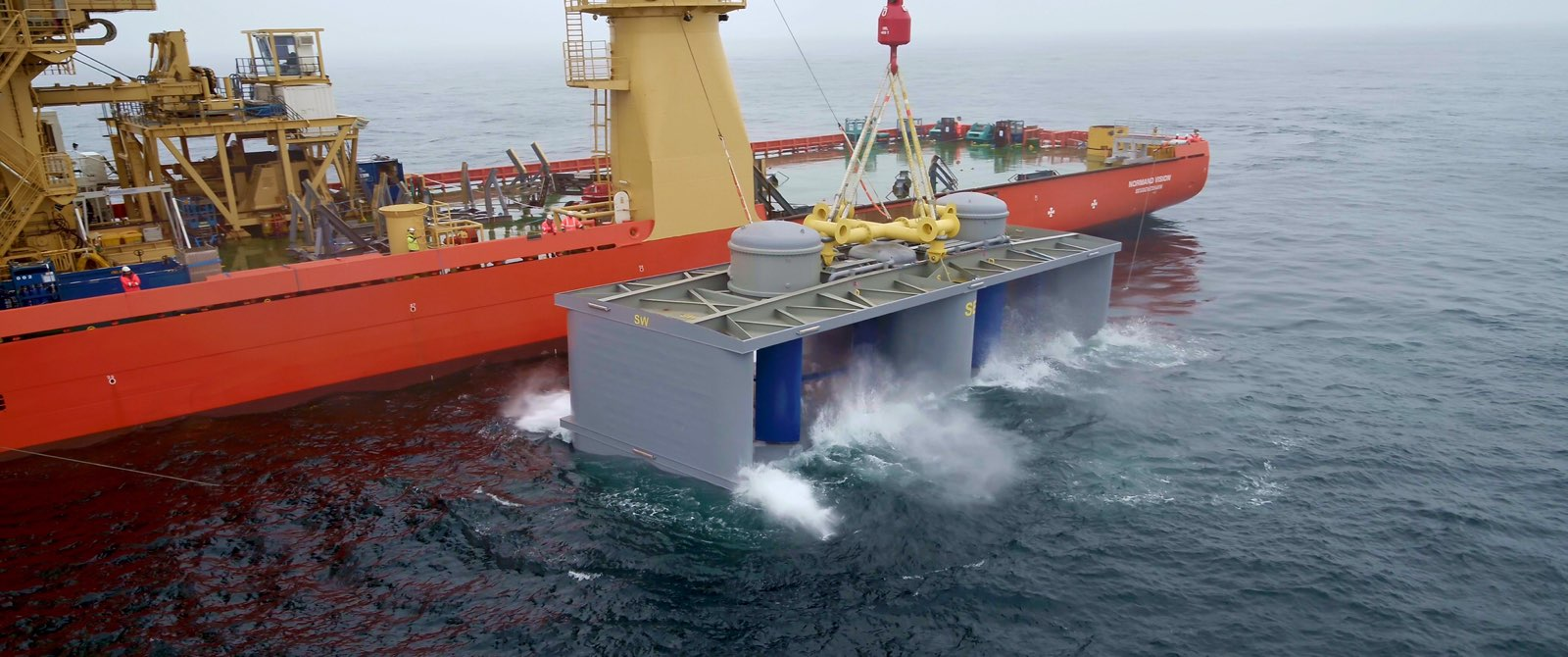
Immersion HydroQuest Ocean

The HydroQuest turbine is a double vertical-axis system with counter-rotating blades, drawing on Darrieus and Achard turbines concepts.

After gaining experience in river-current turbines, HydroQuest expanded into tidal-stream technology in 2016. The tidal stream design consists of two pairs of vertical-axis turbines stacked on two parallel shafts. Each turbine has three blades, with the upper rotor rotated 60° relative to the lower to minimise loading. The rotors were also designed to turn slowly, at around 10–15 rotations per minute, to reduce risk to marine wildlife.

The first-generation tidal turbine included lateral ducts, which were removed in the next-generation design for FloWatt to reduce weight, loads, and costs. The blades have also been redesigned to improve performance.

== History ==
HydroQuest was founded in 2010 in Grenoble to develop a robust vertical-axis turbine technology for river and tidal currents.

In 2013, HydroQuest installed a turbine in the Oyapock river in French Guiana, powering the 200 inhabitants of the Camopi village previously relying on a diesel generator.

A 40 kW HydroQuest 1.40 was tested in the Loire river in Orléans in late 2014, connecting it to the French electricity grid in September 2015. In 2016, it was reported to be the only operational grid-connected fluvial hydro-kinetic turbine in France, having operated for two years.

HydroQuest has collaborated with IFREMER since 2015. In January 2024, they launched the joint VERTI-Lab (vertical axis laboratory), to create specific analysis tools to support the development of vertical axis tidal stream turbines.

In 2024, HydroQuest joined the Ocean Energy Europe (OEE) Board of Directors as a lead partner.

=== River Rhône turbines ===
In 2018, the HydroQuest-Hydrowatt Group installed four grid-connected turbines in the river Rhône near Lyon. They were installed upstream of the Pont Raymond Poincaré near the Parc de la Feyssine. Each turbine was rated at 80 kW, a total of 320 kW, and the project was expected to produce 1 GWh of electricity, or around the average annual consumption of 400 households. The turbines were built by Constructions Mécaniques de Normandie (CMN) in Cherbourg. The farm was inaugurated on 21 December 2018.

A project to install a 2 MW project consisting of 39 HydroQuest turbines, located downstream of the Génissiat Dam on the Rhône, was approved in 2017 by the French Agency for Environment and Energy Management (ADEME). The planned installation was intended to generate enough electricity to supply approximately 2700 inhabitants. It was expected to be built in 2019, but the project appears to have stalled.

=== OceanQuest testing at Paimpol–Bréhat ===
A 1 MW OceanQuest turbine was tested at Paimpol–Bréhat between April 2019 and December 2021. It was again constructed by CMN in Cherbourg, and consisted of four vertical axis turbines each with three blades, mounted in pairs on two shafts. Each rotor was 3.8 m high with a 4 m radius. These were mounted in a frame 9.8 m high and 24.7 m wide, which housed two permanent magnet generators at the top of each shaft. The device sat on a tripod foundation. The power curve of the turbine was certified by Bureau Veritas against IEC TS-62600-200.

In 2025, the Paimpol–Bréhat tidal test site was transferred from its historical operator EDF to the Open-C Foundation, which now manages several French marine renewable energy platforms.

=== FloWatt project ===
In collaboration with CMN and renewable energy company Qair, HydroQuest is developing the FloWatt project, a tidal-stream farm to be located at Raz Blanchard, Normandy. This will consist of six HydroQuest turbine units, each rated at 2.8 MW, for a total capacity of 17 MW. The turbines will be constructed by CMN in Cherbourg. Each unit is 21 m tall, 26 m wide, with a pair of three-bladed turbines mounted on a vertical shaft either side of a central structure.

The Windstaller Alliance, a joint venture between Norwegian companies Aker Solutions, DeepOcean and Solstad Offshore, was contracted to undertake a front-end engineering design for the subsea power systems of the FloWatt project.

In early 2025, HydroQuest signed a contract with the Loire-Atlantique–based company Loiretech for the manufacture of 72 composite blades for the FloWatt pilot farm.

The French Government is supporting the project with €65m funding and dedicated revenue support for the electricity generated. In September 2023, HydroQuest launched a crowdfunding campaign, seeking to raise a further €1.5m for the project. In October 2024, it was announced that HydroQuest and Normandie Hydroliennes had been awarded €51m between them from the European Union's Innovation Fund to develop 29 MW of tidal stream capacity at Raz Blanchard.

Construction of the turbines will begin soon at the CMN shipyard in Cherbourg, with installation planned 3 km offshore at a depth of around 30 m. The pilot farm is expected to be commissioned in 2028, depending on successful deployment and grid connection.

== Company structure ==
HydroQuest is a French company headquartered in Meylan, near Grenoble. The company develops river and tidal stream turbines and is based in the Inovallée technology park. It is led by Thomas Jaquier.

HydroQuest is a subsidiary of CMN Naval, a French multinational company in the shipbuilding sector, which also includes Constructions Mécaniques de Normandie from Cherbourg.
