= IRIS Shamshir =

1978 Iranian fast attack craft

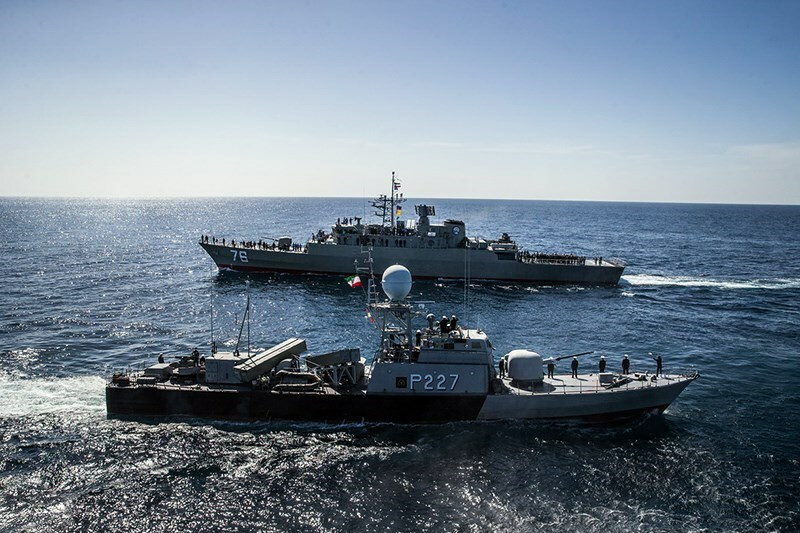
- Shamshir (front) with Jamaran (back)

History

Iran
- Name: Shamshir
- Namesake: Shamshir
- Operator: Islamic Republic of Iran Navy
- Ordered: 14 October 1974
- Builder: Constructions de Mécaniques, Cherbourg
- Laid down: 15 May 1976
- Launched: 12 September 1977
- Commissioned: 31 March 1978
- Refit: 2014
- Status: In service

General characteristics (as built)
- Class & type: Kaman-class fast attack craft
- Displacement: 249 tons standard; 275 tons full load
- Length: 47 m (154 ft 2 in)
- Beam: 7.1 m (23 ft 4 in)
- Draft: 1.9 m (6 ft 3 in)
- Installed power: 4 × MTU 16V538 TB91 diesels, 14,400 brake horsepower (10.7 MW)
- Propulsion: 4 × shafts
- Speed: 36 knots (67 km/h)
- Range: 2,000 miles (3,200 km) at 15 knots (28 km/h); 700 miles (1,100 km) at 33.7 knots (62.4 km/h)
- Complement: 30
- Armament: 4 × Harpoon (single cell); 1 × 76mm/65 (single compact); 1 × 40mm/70 Bofors gun
- Notes: As reported by Jane's (1979)

IRIS Shamshir (Persian: شمشیر, lit. 'Sword') is a Kaman-class fast attack craft in the Southern Fleet of the Islamic Republic of Iran Navy.

== Construction and commissioning ==
Shamshir was built by the French company Constructions Mécaniques de Normandie at Cherbourg, as one of the second six contracted on 14 October 1974. Her keel was laid down on 15 May 1976 and on 12 September 1977, she was launched. Together with Falakhon and Paykan, she was commissioned into the fleet on 31 March 1978.

== Service history ==
During Iran-Iraq War, her home port was Bushehr Naval Base.

Her refit was completed in c. 2014 and Iranian chief of naval operations was quoted as saying, "Shamshir missile-launcher warship is capable of firing different mid-range and long-range surface-to-surface missiles, including Nour and Qader, or any other type of missile after its recent overhaul... The warship also has a double-purpose surface-to-surface and surface-to-air artillery which has been built by Iranian industries and the defense ministry and was tested successfully in the drills". He also added that she is equipped with domestically built radars and new weapons systems, including 76mm caliber cannons.

Starting on 9 April 2014, Shamshir departed home for a six-day search and rescue joint drill with Pakistan Navy and Royal Navy of Oman vessels. Other Iranian vessels in this drill were Alvand, Bushehr and Atashbar, the latter of Revolutionary Guard Corps.

== See also ==
- List of current ships of the Islamic Republic of Iran Navy
- List of military equipment manufactured in Iran
