= IRIS Gardouneh =

Kaman-Class military watercraft

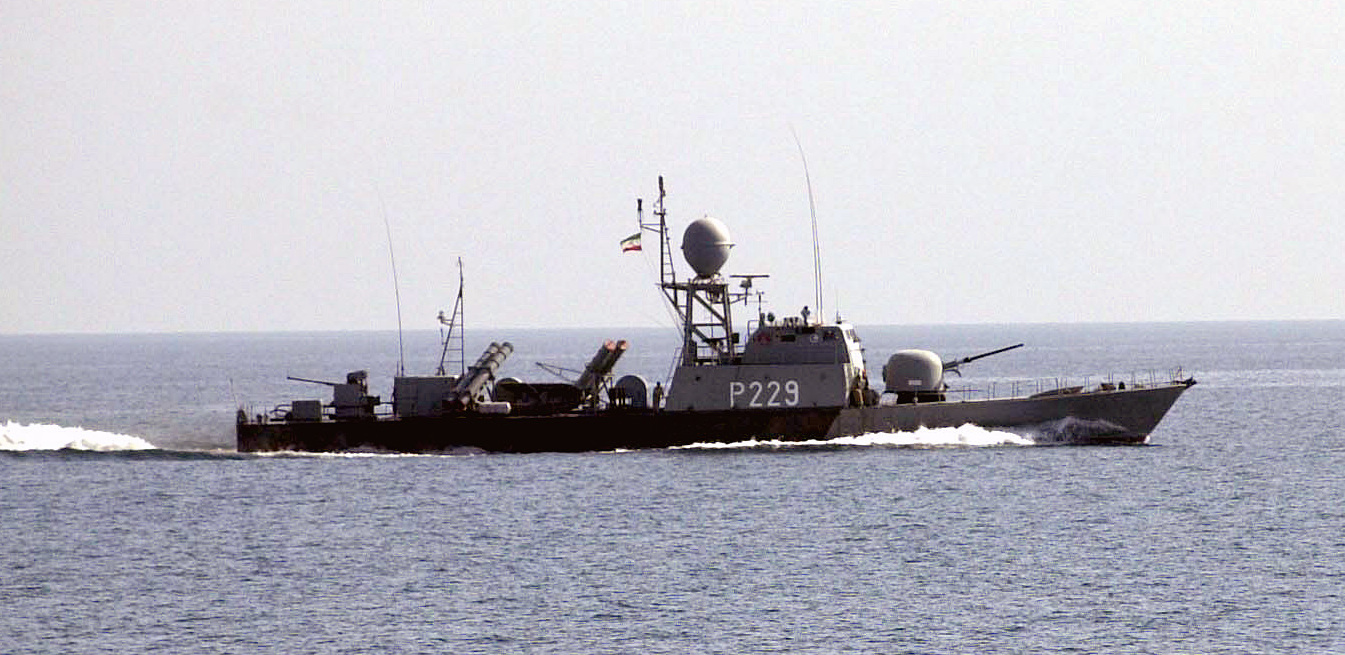
- Gardouneh in 2001

History

Iran
- Name: Gardouneh
- Operator: Islamic Republic of Iran Navy
- Ordered: 19 February 1974
- Builder: Constructions de Mécaniques, Cherbourg
- Laid down: 18 October 1976
- Launched: 23 February 1978
- Commissioned: 11 September 1978
- Status: In service

General characteristics (as built)
- Class & type: Kaman-class fast attack craft
- Displacement: 249 tons standard; 275 tons full load
- Length: 47 m (154 ft 2 in)
- Beam: 7.1 m (23 ft 4 in)
- Draft: 1.9 m (6 ft 3 in)
- Installed power: 4 × MTU 16V538 TB91 diesels, 14,400 brake horsepower (10.7 MW)
- Propulsion: 4 × shafts
- Speed: 36 knots (67 km/h)
- Range: 2,000 miles (3,200 km) at 15 knots (28 km/h); 700 miles (1,100 km) at 33.7 knots (62.4 km/h)
- Complement: 30
- Armament: 4 × Harpoon (single cell); 1 × 76mm/65 (single compact); 1 × 40mm/70 Bofors gun
- Notes: As reported by Jane's (1979)

IRIS Gardouneh (Persian: گردونه, lit. 'Roulette') is a Kaman-class fast attack craft in the Southern Fleet of the Islamic Republic of Iran Navy.

== Construction and commissioning ==
Gardouneh was built by the French company Constructions Mécaniques de Normandie at Cherbourg, as one of the first six contracted on 19 February 1974. Her keel was laid down on 18 October 1976 and on 23 February 1978, she was launched. Gardouneh was commissioned into the fleet on 11 September 1978.

== Service history ==
During Iran-Iraq War, her home port was Bushehr Naval Base. On 28 October 1980, Gardouneh and her sister ships Paykan and Joshan were deployed to attack Iraqi oil facilities at al-Faw, supported by a Sikorsky SH-3 Sea King. The operation was repeated again on October 31 by the same naval group. However, in this operation Iranian vessels were engaged with three Iraqi Osa-class missile boats, that fired Styx missiles at them and drew back with maximum speed. Gardouneh and the two other vessels managed to avoid the missiles but could not retaliate.
