= CMN Naval =

- Type: S.A.
- Industry: Ship and yacht construction
- Founded: April 4, 2022; 4 years ago
- Headquarters: Paris, France
- Key people: Pierre Balmer
- Number of employees: 1,200 (2024)
- Subsidiaries: Constructions mécaniques de Normandie, German Naval Yards, HydroQuest
- Website: cmnnaval.com

CMN Naval is a French multinational shipbuilding and yacht construction company. In 2024, CMN Naval employed 1,200 people in France, Germany, and the United Kingdom. The group is headed by Pierre Balmer.

== History ==
The shipbuilding company has been operating since 2022 under the name CMN Naval SA.

In 2025, CMN Naval created the joint venture ADN in collaboration with Edge Group, a company active in the field of defence systems.

== Company structure ==
CMN Naval is a private company with sites in Europe and the Middle East. The Board of Directors consists of Pierre Balmer, Jean Durand-Ruel and Amélie Klotz.

The CMN Naval Group is a European shipbuilding group that includes shipyards such as Constructions Mécaniques de Normandie (CMN) in France, German Naval Yards in Germany, and Isherwoods in the United Kingdom. In addition, the subsidiaries HydroQuest, AMT, and ACE are also part of CMN Naval.

== Products and services ==
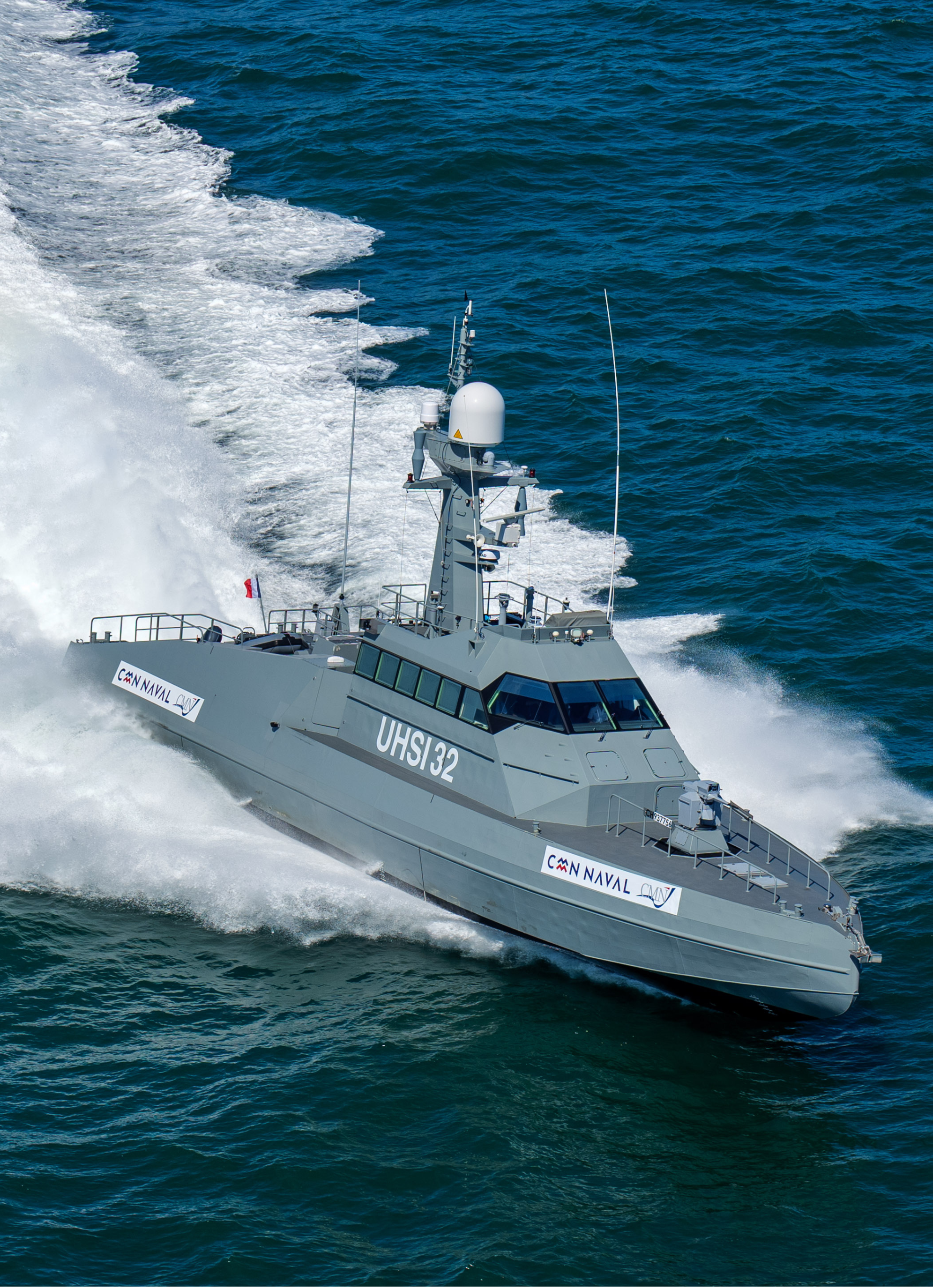
CMN Naval UHSI32

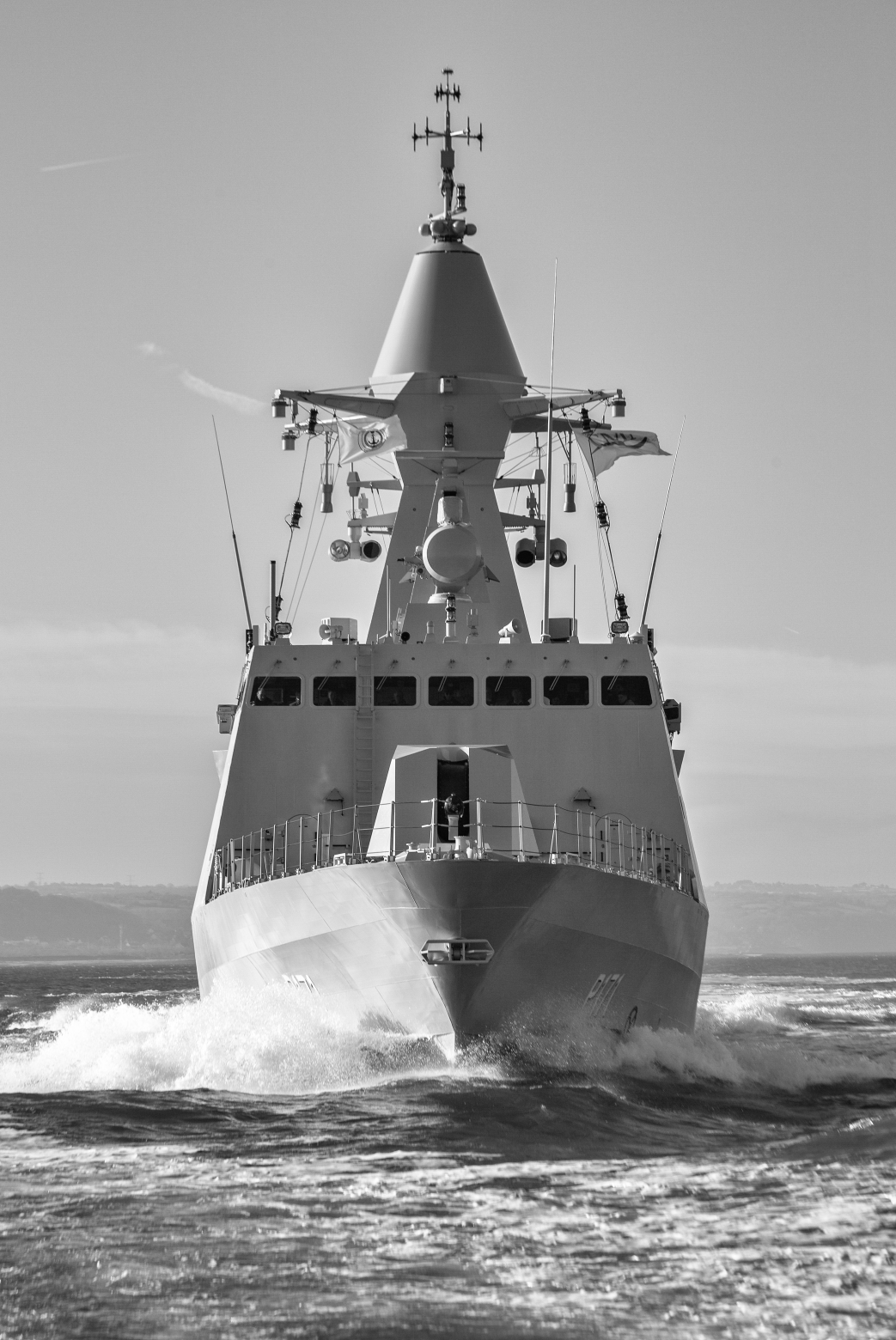
CMN Naval BR71 Baynunah class

CMN Naval operates in three main business areas: shipbuilding, renewable energy and integrated logistics support. The vessels sold include high-speed interceptors such as the HSI32, designed for operations such as naval strikes and search and rescue missions. The HSI32 was also developed as an unmanned version, UHSI32, which navigates autonomously but can also be operated via land-based remote control. For remote surveillance, CMN Naval offers, for example, the Ocean Eagle 43, which features a trimaran hull. The Vigilante class includes offshore patrol vessels suited to both coastal and high-seas operations. In the corvette sector, CMN Naval has developed the Seaguard 96. In addition to military vessels, CMN Naval also builds yachts.

CMN Naval offers integrated logistic support (ILS), technology transfer, nuclear power plant maintenance, refit and conversion, combat system integration, stealth technology, and technical and tactical training. With its subsidiary HydroQuest, CMN Naval also offers systems in the field of sustainable marine energy production, such as tidal turbines. These turbines convert energy from tidal currents into renewable and predictable electricity.
