= IRIS Gorz =

1978 Iranian fast attack craft

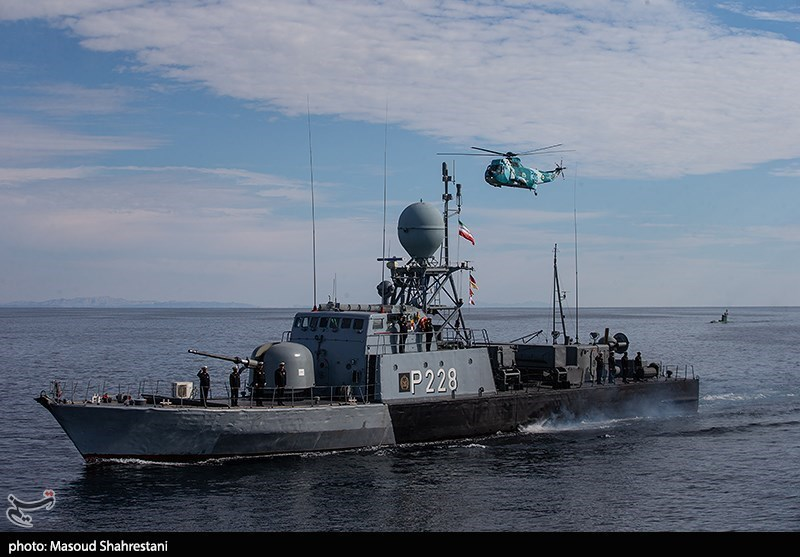

History

Iran
- Name: Gorz
- Namesake: Gorz
- Operator: Islamic Republic of Iran Navy
- Ordered: 14 October 1974
- Builder: Constructions de Mécaniques, Cherbourg
- Laid down: 5 August 1976
- Launched: 28 December 1977
- Commissioned: 22 August 1978
- Refit: 1996–1998
- Status: In service

General characteristics (as built)
- Class & type: Kaman-class fast attack craft
- Displacement: 249 tons standard; 275 tons full load
- Length: 47 m (154 ft 2 in)
- Beam: 7.1 m (23 ft 4 in)
- Draft: 1.9 m (6 ft 3 in)
- Installed power: 4 × MTU 16V538 TB91 diesels, 14,400 brake horsepower (10.7 MW)
- Propulsion: 4 × shafts
- Speed: 36 knots (67 km/h)
- Range: 2,000 miles (3,200 km) at 15 knots (28 km/h); 700 miles (1,100 km) at 33.7 knots (62.4 km/h)
- Complement: 30
- Armament: 4 × Harpoon (single cell); 1 × 76mm/65 (single compact); 1 × 40mm/70 Bofors gun
- Notes: As reported by Jane's (1979)

IRIS Gorz (Persian: گرز, lit. 'Mace') is a Kaman-class fast attack craft serving in the Southern Fleet of the Islamic Republic of Iran Navy. Being able to launch Mehrab (a reverse engineered version of RIM-66 Standard), she is considered the smallest warship in the world to operate such a missile. It is reportedly the only ship in her class that is capable of firing surface-to-air missiles, as of 2020.

== History ==
During Iran-Iraq War, Gorz was assigned to Bushehr Naval Base.

From 1996 to 1998, she was used for modernization trials.

In the wargame Velayat 90, on 1 January 2012, she fired the Mehrab missile for the first time, marking its first operational test. The ship was modernized in 2015–2021.

== See also ==
- List of current ships of the Islamic Republic of Iran Navy
- List of military equipment manufactured in Iran
