= Sa'ar 2-class missile boat =

Class of missile boats

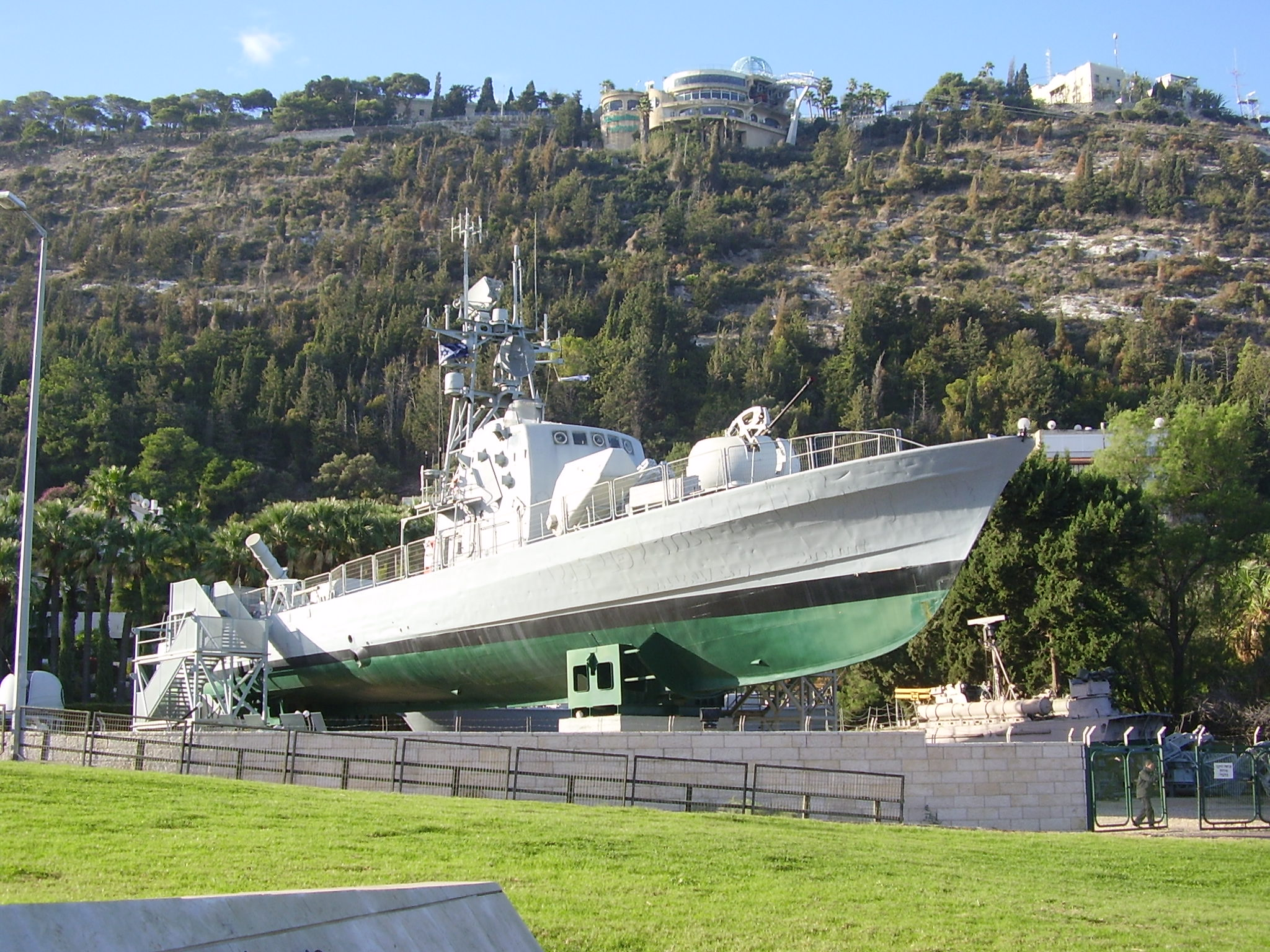
- INS Mivtach on display at the Clandestine Immigration and Naval Museum, Haifa

Class overview
- Name: Sa'ar 2 class
- Builders: Constructions Mécaniques de Normandie
- Operators: Israeli Navy
- Succeeded by: Sa'ar 3-class missile boat
- In commission: 1967-1997
- Completed: 6

General characteristics
- Type: Missile boat
- Displacement: 220 tons (250 tons loaded)
- Length: 45 m (148 ft)
- Beam: 7.62 m (25.0 ft)
- Draft: 1.8 m (5.9 ft)
- Propulsion: 4 MTU 16V 538 diesel engines, four shafts, total of 12,800 hp (9,500 kW)
- Speed: 40 knots (74 km/h; 46 mph)
- Range: 2,500 nmi (4,600 km; 2,900 mi) at 15 kn (28 km/h; 17 mph) 1,000 nmi (1,900 km; 1,200 mi) at 30 kn (56 km/h; 35 mph)
- Complement: 40
- Sensors & processing systems: Thomson-CSF Neptune THD 1040 air & surface surveillance radar; Selenia Orion RTN-10X fire-control radar; ELAC hull-mounted sonar; EDO 780 variable depth sonar
- Armament: 4 × RGM-84 Harpoon SSMs; and; 2 × Gabriel II SSMs; or; 5-8 x Gabriel II SSMs; 1 × Bofors L/70 40 mm gun; 2 × 0.30 in (7.62 mm) caliber M1919A4 Browning machine guns; 4 × 7.62 mm FN MAG 58 general-purpose machine guns

The Sa'ar 2 class ("Shalechet") is a class of missile boats built in Cherbourg, France at the Constructions Mécaniques de Normandie shipyard based on Israeli Navy modification of the German Navy's Jaguar-class fast attack craft. Three of the ships class were converted from Sa'ar 1-class patrol boats in 1974.

== Design and development ==
The Israeli naval command had reached the conclusion by the early 1960s that their old Second World War-era destroyers, frigates and corvettes were obsolete and new ships and vessels were needed. Yitzhak Shoshan, later to command the destroyer INS Eilat at the time of her sinking, surveyed the available torpedo boat designs and recommended the German Jaguar class. The Israeli Navy asked Lürssen, the shipyard which built the Jaguar class, to modify the wooden design by switching to steel construction, adding 2.4 metres (7.9 ft) to the length, and revising the internal compartmentalization. Due to Arab League pressure on the German government, this plan was not continued and a new builder was sought. The Israeli Navy discovered that the Cherbourg-based Constructions Mécaniques de Normandie shipyard owned by Félix Amiot had experience building patrol boats in cooperation with Lürssen and would build the boats, based upon the German designs and plans. The engines were imported from Germany. The project received the codename "Falling Leaves" (Hebrew: שלכת).

An initial group of six boats was ordered in 1965, with an armament of Bofors 40 mm guns and torpedo tubes and provision for fitting sonar. This group was designated the Sa'ar 1 class. When refitted with Gabriel anti-ship missiles, they became the Sa'ar 2 class. A second group of six boats, the Sa'ar 3 class, was ordered in 1968, with an OTO Melara 76 mm gun instead of the Bofors guns of the Sa'ar 1 class and with anti-submarine provisions omitted.

== Description ==
The boats were long, slender vessels. They measured 44.9 metres (147 ft 4 in) in length, with a beam of 7.62 metres (25 ft 0 in) and a draft of 1.7 metres (5 ft 7 in). Displacement is 220 long tons (220 t) standard and 250 long tons (250 t) full load. The boats were powered by four MTU 16V 538 diesel engines giving a total power of 13,500 bhp (10,100 kW) and driving four propeller shafts. This gave a maximum speed of 42 knots (78 km/h; 48 mph). Range was 2,500 nmi (4,600 km; 2,900 mi) at 15 kn (28 km/h; 17 mph) or 1,000 nautical miles (1,900 km; 1,200 mi) at 30 knots (56 km/h; 35 mph).

The vessels in the class come in two versions of armament. One version is equipped with five to eight Gabriel II surface-to-surface missiles (SSM), one Bofors L/70 40 mm gun, two 7.62 NATO caliber M1919A4 Browning machine guns and four 7.62 NATO FN MAG 58 general-purpose machine guns.

The other version is equipped with four RGM-84 Harpoon SSMs and two Gabriel II SSMs.

== Boats in the class ==
Sa'ar 2 class
Number	Name	Translation	Builder	Launched	Fate
311	INS Mivtach	Reliance	Constructions Mécaniques de Normandie	11 April 1967	Retired 1994
312	INS Miznak	Jet branch	Constructions Mécaniques de Normandie	1967	Retired 1994
313	INS Misgav	Stronghold	Constructions Mécaniques de Normandie	1967	Retired 1994
321	INS Eilat	Eilat	Constructions Mécaniques de Normandie	14 June 1968	Retired 1994
322	INS Haifa	Haifa	Constructions Mécaniques de Normandie	14 June 1968	
323	INS Akko	Akko	Constructions Mécaniques de Normandie	1968	

== See also ==
- List of ships of the Israeli Navy
