= IRIS Falakhon =

1978 Iranian fast attack craft

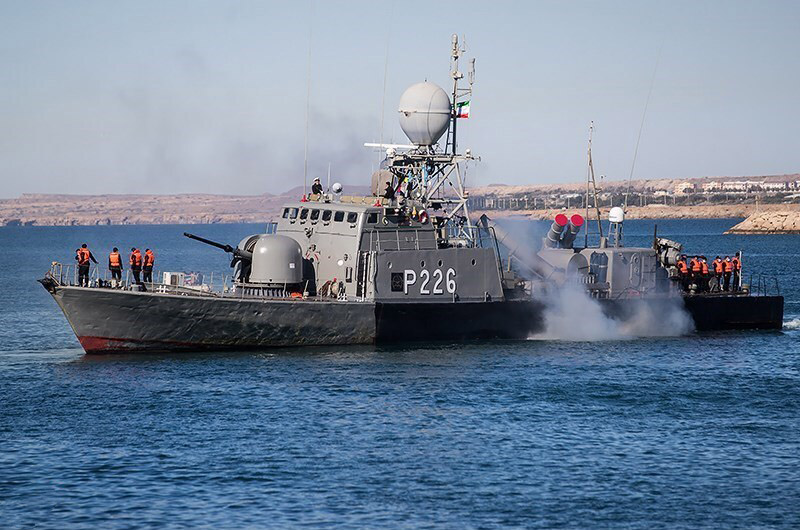

History

Iran
- Name: Falakhon
- Namesake: Falakhon
- Operator: Islamic Republic of Iran Navy
- Ordered: 19 February 1974
- Builder: Constructions de Mécaniques, Cherbourg
- Laid down: 15 March 1976
- Launched: 2 June 1977
- Commissioned: 31 March 1978
- Status: In service

General characteristics (as built)
- Class & type: Kaman-class fast attack craft
- Displacement: 249 tons standard; 275 tons full load
- Length: 47 m (154 ft 2 in)
- Beam: 7.1 m (23 ft 4 in)
- Draft: 1.9 m (6 ft 3 in)
- Installed power: 4 × MTU 16V538 TB91 diesels, 14,400 brake horsepower (10.7 MW)
- Propulsion: 4 × shafts
- Speed: 36 knots (67 km/h)
- Range: 2,000 miles (3,200 km) at 15 knots (28 km/h); 700 miles (1,100 km) at 33.7 knots (62.4 km/h)
- Complement: 30
- Armament: 4 × Harpoon (single cell); 1 × 76mm/65 (single compact); 1 × 40mm/70 Bofors gun
- Notes: As reported by Jane's (1979)

IRIS Falakhon (Persian: فلاخن, lit. 'Sling') is a Kaman-class fast attack craft in the Southern Fleet of the Islamic Republic of Iran Navy.

== Construction and commissioning ==
Falakhon was built by the French company Constructions Mécaniques de Normandie at Cherbourg, as one of the first six contracted on 19 February 1974. Her keel was laid down on 15 March 1976 and on 2 June 1977, she was launched. Falakhon was commissioned into the fleet on 31 March 1978, together with Shamshir and Paykan.

== Service history ==
During the Iran–Iraq War, her home port was the Bushehr Naval Base. She was part of the naval group — together with Khanjar (P230), Hendijan (1401), Deylam (424) and Ghadir (953) — that arrived at Karachi on 2 May 2014 for a five-day joint exercise with Pakistan Navy, and returned home on 14 May 2014. From 8 to 15 April 2017, along with Sabalan (73) and Lavan (514), she participated in a join naval drill with the Royal Navy of Oman.

== See also ==
- List of current ships of the Islamic Republic of Iran Navy
- List of military equipment manufactured in Iran
