= Abbas Doran =

Iranian fighter pilot (1950–1982)

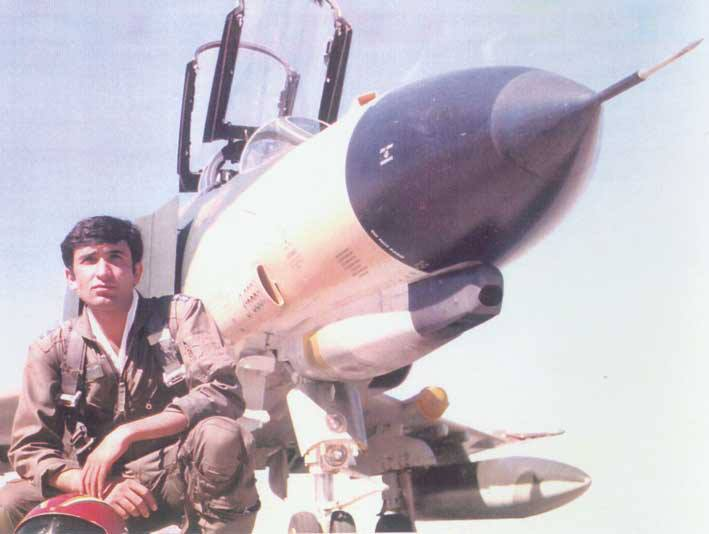
- Doran beside his F-4 Phantom II fighter jet
- Born: 22 October 1950; Shiraz, Imperial State of Iran
- Died: 21 July 1982 (aged 31); Baghdad, Ba'athist Iraq
- Military career
- Allegiance: Imperial State of Iran (1970–1979); Iran (1979–1982)
- Branch: Islamic Republic of Iran Air Force
- Service years: 1970–1982
- Rank: Lieutenant colonel
- Conflicts: Iran–Iraq War; Operation Fath ol-Mobin; Operation Morvarid; Operation Baghdad †

Abbas Doran (Persian: عباس دوران; October 22, 1950 – July 21, 1982) was an Iranian fighter pilot and war hero. Doran piloted an F-4 Phantom II in the Imperial Iranian Air Force and the Islamic Republic of Iran Air Force. He was killed in action during the Iran–Iraq War after he crashed his plane in a Baghdad city square whilst conducting a mission on the city.

== Education and career ==
Abbas Dowraan attended the Undergraduate Pilot Training Program at Columbus Air Force Base. He graduated in the autumn of 1972 as a member of Class 73–02.

While serving in the Iranian Air Force, he participated in air strikes against the Iraqi Navy during Operation Morvarid in October 1980. He was valued for planning IRIAF operations missions against the Iraqi military with a high rate of success. During the Iran-Iraq war he petitioned Islamic Republic political leaders, asking them to stop arresting and executing former Imperial Iranian Air Force pilots.

== Last mission ==
In 1982, in an attempt to show the world that Iraq was stable and safe and has the upper hand in the war, Saddam Hussein planned to host the 7th Summit of the international Non-Aligned Movement in Baghdad. The conference was planned to take place at Baghdad's Al-Rashid Hotel. Iran tried to show that Baghdad was vulnerable to IRIAF air strikes. On July 21, 1982, Doran flew his F-4E Phantom to Baghdad and attacked the Al-Doura refinery in Baghdad. His F-4E was then hit by a Roland 2 SAM. His weapon systems officer ejected from the aircraft and was taken prisoner. In order to force the cancellation of the conference and show Baghdad insecurity, Doran directed his aircraft into the Al-Rashid Hotel and crashed in a square near the hotel in Baghdad. To this date, no one really knows for certain why Abbas did not eject from his aircraft. Some people say that the ejection seat might have malfunctioned, while others believe that he did not want to go through the burden of evading Iraqis or becoming a prisoner. His actions caused the summit to be held in New Delhi instead of Baghdad.

== Legacy ==
Due to his actions and sacrifice during the war, General Dowraan became regarded as a hero of the IRIAF. Iraq returned Doran's remains (a leg bone) to Iran on 21 July 2002.

== See also ==
- Iranian aerial victories during the Iran-Iraq war
