= Operation Morvarid =

1980 Iranian strike in the Iran–Iraq War

- Part of the Iran–Iraq War
Date	27–28 November 1980 (1 day)
Location	Parts of the Persian Gulf and Iraq
Result	Iranian victory

Belligerents
Iran	Iraq

Commanders and leaders
(Iran) Bahram Afzali; (Iran) Javad Fakoori	(Iraq) Mohamed Al-Jeboury; (Iraq) Aladdin Al-Janabi

Units involved
Navy; Air Force; Army Aviation	Navy; Air Force

Strength
6 amphibious vessels 2 missile boats Unknown number of marines and aircraft	5 missile boats 4 torpedo boats Several MiG-23 and Su-22 fighters Several-SAM sites

Casualties and losses
1 missile boat sunk 1 F-4 Phantom downed Unknown marine losses	5 Osa II boats sunk 4 P-6 boats sunk 3 light patrol boats sunk 1 amphibious assault ship sunk 1 MiG-23s downed 1 Su-22 downed Several SAM-sites destroyed 2 strategic oil terminals destroyed +100 killed
- The day of the operation (28 November 1980) is celebrated in Iran as "the Navy Day"

Operation Morvarid (Persian: عملیات مروارید, lit. 'Operation Pearl') was an operation launched by the Iranian Navy and Air Force against the Iraqi Navy sites on 27 November 1980 in response to Iraq positioning radar and monitoring equipment on the Mina Al-Bakr and Khor-al-Amaya oil rigs to counter Iranian air operations. The operation resulted in a victory for Iran, which managed to destroy both oil rigs as well as much of the Iraqi Navy and inflicted significant damage to Iraqi ports and airfields.

== Background ==
In late November, the Iranians decided to respond to the Iraqi destruction of the Abadan Refinery by neutralizing the Kohr al-Amaya and Mina al-Bakr offshore oil terminals. As a result of these attacks, it was planned that Iraq's navy would be drawn into the open sea where Iran's air force and navy would destroy it.

== Battle ==
On 27 November 1980, after Iranian technicians prepared as many aircraft and helicopters as possible, Iranian F-4 Phantoms and F-5 Tiger IIs attacked Iraqi airfields around Basra.

During the night of 28 November, six ships of the Islamic Republic of Iran Navy's Task Force 421 deployed Iranian marines on the Iraqi oil terminals at Mina al Bakr and Khor-al-Amaya. The marines, supported by Army Aviation's AH-1J Cobras, Bell 214s and CH-47C Chinooks, eliminated most Iraqi defenders during a short firefight, then deployed a large number of bombs and mines. They were then evacuated by helicopter and left the Iraqi oil installations and early warning bases in flames. According to other sources, the oil terminas were captured by Iranian special forces delivered by three helicopters (two AB.212ASW and one ASH-3D Sea King), taking the defenders by surprise, and then Iranian reinforcements and engineers with explosives arrived by three hovercraft. The engineers placed demolition charges, and then the landing parties were evacuated to the hovercraft and returned to Bushehr, with a few dozens of Iraqi prisoners of war..

At the same time, two Iranian Kaman-class (La Combattante II type) missile boats (Paykan and Joshan) blockaded the ports of Al Faw and Umm Qasr, blocking 60 foreign ships and shelling both facilities.

In response, the Iraqi Navy deployed P-6 torpedo boats and Osa II-class missile boats for a counter-attack. The boats engaged the two Iranian missile boats which managed to sink two Osas with Harpoon missiles. The remaining three Osa-class missile boats continued to attack the missile boat Paykan. The crew of the Paykan called IRIAF for assistance which sent two F-4s (each armed with six AGM-65 Maverick missiles). By the time they arrived, however, Paykan had been sunk after being hit by two Iraqi P-15 Termit missiles. In response, the F-4s targeted the remaining Iraqi ships and sunk three Osa IIs and four P-6s. According to more thorough recent sources however, only one P-6 torpedo boat was sunk by Peykan's Harpoon missiles, and then only two Osa missile boats were sunk by F-4s.

Soon four more Iranian F-4s arrived from Shiraz Air Base, bombed the port of Al Faw, and, together with F-5s, destroyed the surrounding Iraqi SAM sites. One Iranian F-4 was downed while another was hit and damaged by an Iraqi SA-7 surface-to-air missile but managed to return to base.

At this time, the Iranian F-14 Tomcat formations joined the battle and, together with several F-4s, covered the withdrawal of Task Force 421 and bombed the Iraqi oil rigs. Next, they attacked the Mina al Bakr terminal. An Iraqi Su-22 attacked Paykan, which managed to shoot it down with its 76-mm gun turret. The Iraqis scrambled four MiG-23 Floggers to defend the terminal. Shortly after, an Iranian F-14 downed one of the MiGs, forcing the other three to flee.

== Aftermath ==
The destruction of Iraqi SAM sites and radar and monitoring equipment made it possible for the IRIAF to attack via southern Iraq again. The Iranian missile boat Joshan which took part in this operation was later sunk during Operation Praying Mantis by U.S. Navy warships.

== See also ==
- Abbas Doran
- Combat history of the F-14
- Operation Kaman 99 (1980)
- Attack on H3
