= La Combattante II type fast attack craft =

1976 class of French fast attack craft

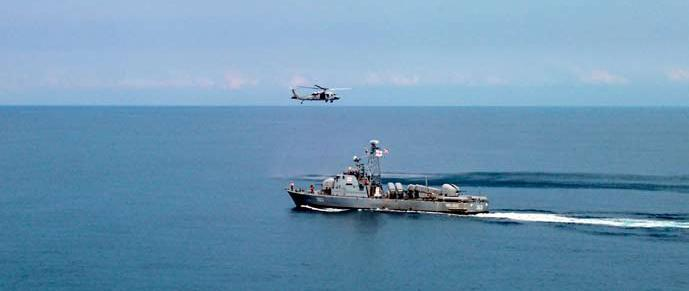
Patrol boat Fighter II Dioskuria

The La Combattante II patrol boat was a type of fast attack craft built in France for export during the 1970s. Some 37 were built in various classes for several navies around the world.

== Development ==
The La Combattante II type fast attack craft began as a German-French joint venture, proposed by the German government to combine a Lürssen-designed fast patrol boat with Aerospatiale's Exocet missile. These were intended for export to Israel. However the French government insisted on a French design from Constructions Mécaniques de Normandie (CMN) in Cherbourg and for half the boats in the order to be built in France. In the end the first group of 20 boats to be built were transferred to the German Bundesmarine, for political reasons. They were commissioned in 1968 as the Tiger class. A number of these were later sold on to the navies of Greece, Chile and Egypt.

Following this, between 1968 and 1974 CMN built a further 37 vessels for export. these were known as the La Combattante II type, after the vessel used for trials of the Exocet, the patrol craft La Combattante. These were built for the navies of Iran (12 Kaman class), Malaysia (four Perdana class) and Libya (nine Beir Grassa class). In the same period CMN built 12 fast attack craft to a similar design for Israel (the Sa'ar 1-3 classes) which are included by some sources in the type.

These vessels were typically of 234 tons displacement and 47 m (154 ft 2 in) in length, and a typical armament of one 76 mm (3 in) gun forward, four Exocet missiles in box launchers amidships, and a 40 mm (1.6 in) gun aft, though actual outfits varied according to the operators requirements.

== Ship list ==
=== Iran ===
Iran ordered 12 ships of the same class (known in Iran as Kaman class), nine of which were delivered in 1977 and 1978, and three of which were delayed until 1981 as a result of the 1979 Islamic Revolution. The Paykan was sunk during Operation Morvarid in 1980, while Joshan was sunk by USS Simpson during Operation Praying Mantis in 1988. These ships are not to be confused with the new Joshan and Paykan, which were named in their memories. Iran built a heavily upgraded version of this class called the Sina class. As of 2012 Iran has built four Sina-class vessels and is building five more of this class.

Kaman class
Pennant number	Name	Ordered	Laid down	Launched	Commissioned	Status
P221	Kaman	19 February 1974	5 February 1975	8 January 1976	12 August 1977	In service
P222	Xoubin	19 February 1974	4 April 1975	14 April 1976	12 September 1977	In service
P223	Khadang	19 February 1974	20 June 1975	15 July 1976	15 March 1978	In service
P225	Joshan	19 February 1974	5 January 1976	21 February 1977	23 March 1978	Sunk in 1988
P224	Paykan	19 February 1974	15 October 1975	12 October 1976	31 March 1978	Sunk in 1980
P226	Falakhon	19 February 1974	15 March 1976	2 June 1977	31 March 1978	In service
P227	Shamshir	14 October 1974	15 May 1976	12 September 1977	31 March 1978	In service
P228	Gorz	14 October 1974	5 August 1976	28 December 1977	22 August 1978	In service
P229	Gardouneh	14 October 1974	18 October 1976	23 February 1978	11 September 1978	In service
P230	Khanjar	14 October 1974	17 January 1977	27 April 1978	1 August 1981	In service
P231	Neyzeh	14 October 1974	12 September 1977	5 July 1978	1 August 1981	In service
P232	Tabarzin	14 October 1974	24 June 1977	15 September 1978	1 August 1981	In service
Source: Conway's All The World's Fighting Ships (1996)

=== Malaysia ===
Perdana class
Pennant number	Name	Commission Year	Class
3501	KD Perdana	21 December 1972	Perdana
3502	KD Serang	31 January 1973	Perdana
3503	KD Ganas	28 February 1973	Perdana
3504	KD Ganyang	28 March 1973	Perdana

=== Libya ===
A version called the Beir Grassa class, of which 10 were built and 8 were operational as of 1995, were used by the Libyan Navy. One had been sunk and another disabled during a 1986 confrontation with US forces.

Beir Grassa class
Pennant number	Name	Commissioned
518	Beir Grassa	
522	Beir Gzir	
524	Beir Gitfa	
526	Beir Glulud	
528	Beir Algandula	
532	Beir Ktitat	
536	Beir Alkardmen	
538	Beir Alkur	
542	Beir Alkuesat	

=== Israel ===
An initial group of six boats was ordered in 1965, with an armament of Bofors 40 mm guns, torpedo tubes and provision for fitting sonar. This group was designated the Sa'ar 1 class. When refitted with Gabriel anti-ship missiles, they became the Sa'ar 2 class.

A second group of six boats, the Sa'ar 3 class, was ordered in 1968, with an OTO Melara 76 mm gun instead of the Bofors guns of the Sa'ar 1 class and with anti-submarine provisions omitted.

== See also ==
- La Combattante-class fast attack craft
- Greek La Combattante IIa-class fast attack craft
