= Bushehr Naval Base =

- Active: 1971
- Country: Iran
- Allegiance: Armed Forces of the Islamic Republic of Iran
- Branch: Islamic Republic of Iran Army
- Type: Navy
- Role: Support unit
- Size: Naval base
- Part of: Islamic Republic of Iran Navy; 2nd Naval Region, Velayat
- Garrison/HQ: Bushehr, Bushehr Province
- Engagements: Iran–Iraq War

Commanders
- Commander: Rear Admiral 2nd Class Commando Morteza Darkhoran
- Deputy Commander: Captain 1st Class Amin Arshadi
- Notable commanders: Babak Amini; Jafar Tazakor; Ehsan Nasiri

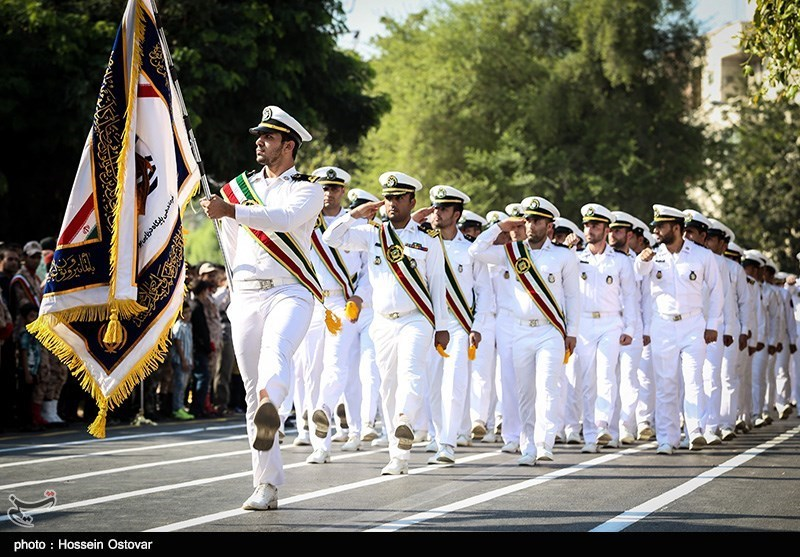
Parade of Bushehr Naval Base forces on the anniversary of the Iran–Iraq War, 2017, Bushehr

Bushehr Naval Base is one of the bases of the Islamic Republic of Iran Navy, operating under the command of the 2nd Naval Region, Velayat. The current commander is Rear Admiral 2nd Class Commando Morteza Darkhoran.

The base was established in the early 1970s by the Imperial Iranian Navy. During the Iran–Iraq War, Bushehr Naval Base served as a support unit of the army, and 266 of its personnel were killed in action.

In the past, the base was the second-largest naval region, with significant infrastructure and equipment. After the creation of the 2nd Naval Region, Velayat in Jask, most operational forces were transferred there, and the Bushehr naval region was downgraded to a base. Today, it still provides logistical support for the operational units of the 2nd Naval Region and is also used for advanced officer training.
