= Constructions Mécaniques de Normandie =

Shipyard in Cherbourg, France

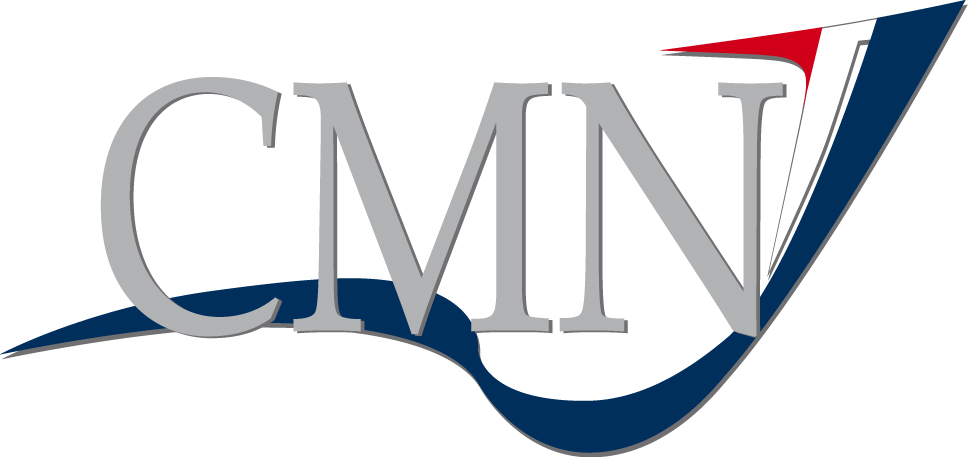
- Type: Subsidiary
- Industry: Shipbuilding
- Founded: 1946
- Founder: Félix Amiot
- Headquarters: Cherbourg, France
- Key people: Serge Quaranta
- Products: Combattante-class corvettes and offshore patrol boats, vigilante-class, tidal turbines
- Revenue: €158 million (2024)
- Net income: €24.4 million (2024)
- Number of employees: 450 (2024)
- Parent: CMN Naval
- Website: cmn-group.com

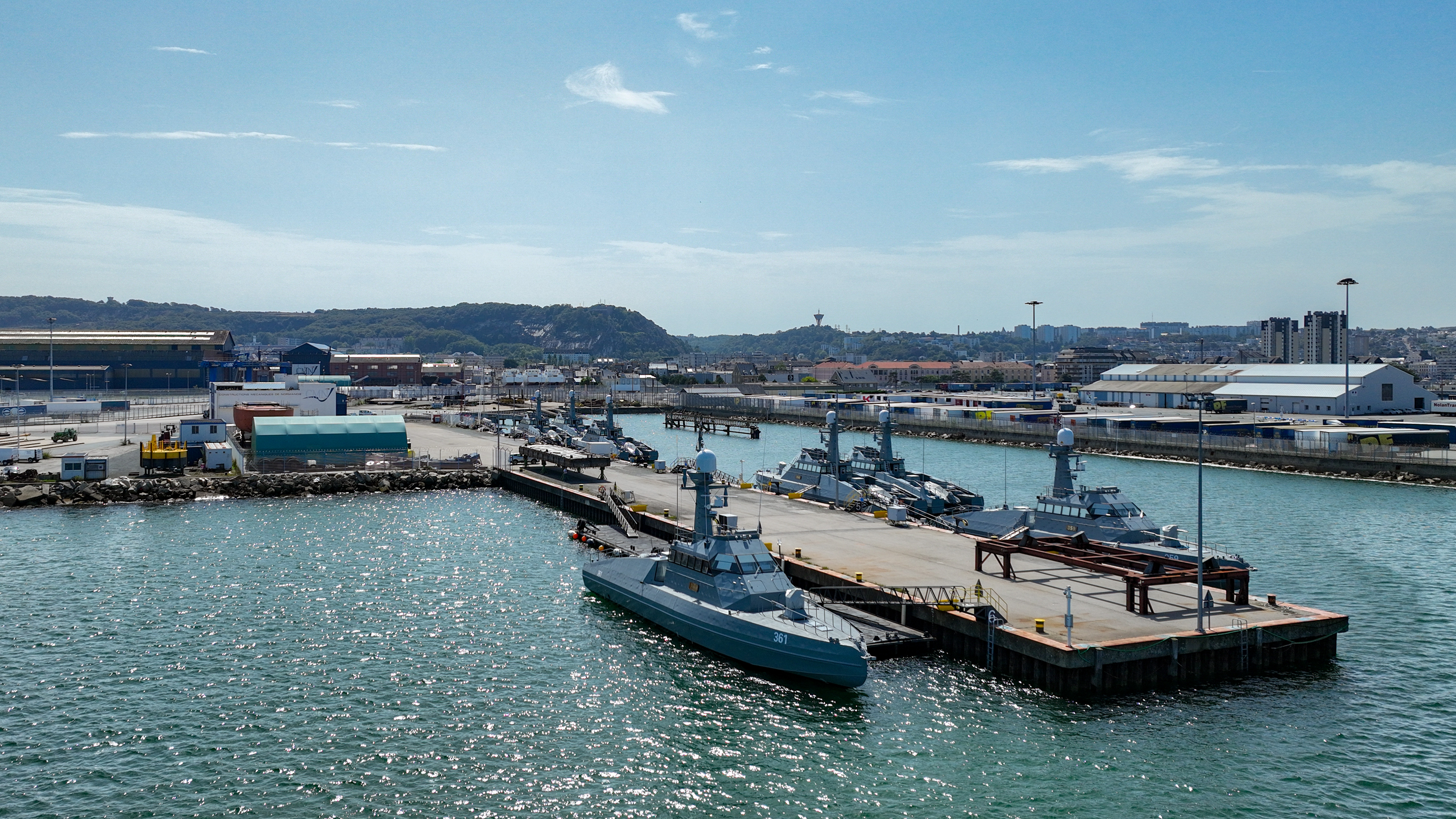
CMN slipway in Cherbourg

Constructions Mécaniques de Normandie (CMN) is a French shipyard located at Cherbourg. It employs approximately 450 employees covering the various specialities required for the construction of military vessels, research vessels and related naval services. It is a subsidiary of the CMN Naval group.

Since its foundation in 1946, the shipyard has delivered over 450 vessels.

== History ==
The shipyard was founded in 1946 by the French aircraft constructor, Félix Amiot in Cherbourg, France. The first vessel built by CMN was a wooden trawler which was launched on 23 June 1948 and soon diversified its products to minesweeperss, coast guard vessels, fishing boats, barges, patrol boats and fast attack crafts.

In the 1960s, the shipyard specialized in building vessels with the CMN patented "glued laminated wood technique", especially the minesweepers for the French and German navies. One of its major minesweeper series was the well-known Circé-class minehunters (the first one was launched on 15 December 1970, the following four between 1971 and 1972). The glued laminated technique was the best answer to the ship qualities in terms of non-magnetism, noise absorption or noise reflecting.

From 1967, Amiot diversified CMN's offerings with fast attack crafts with a wood-cored laminated hull. The incident that marked the beginning of a new class of fast attack craft in shipbuilding — La Combattante II, was the sinking of the Israeli destroyer INS Eilat on 21 October 1967 by two Egyptian Komar-class missile boats, as the destroyer sailed in international waters off Port Said.

In 1962, Lürssen of Germany signed an agreement to supply Israel with twelve of the Jaguar-class fast attack craft vessels. After the delivery of three of the twelve missile boats in 1964, Germany had to renounce the agreement owing to political pressures from Arab nations. The Germans, however, agreed that the boats could be constructed elsewhere and CMN was chosen to construct the remaining nine, which would be of La Combattante II class (Sa'ar-1-class Israeli Navy designate) fast attack crafts.

During the 1970s, the Bundesmarine (German Federal Navy), ordered 20 La Combattante II fast attack crafts. The Tiger-class fast attack craft is a modification of the French La Combattante II design.

In the 2000s, CMN developed the Combattante BR70 design, which formed the basis of the Baynunah-class corvettes for the United Arab Emirates Navy. The lead ship of the class was constructed at CMN’s Cherbourg shipyard, while the remaining vessels were built in Abu Dhabi by Abu Dhabi Ship Building (ADSB) under a transfer-of-technology programme.

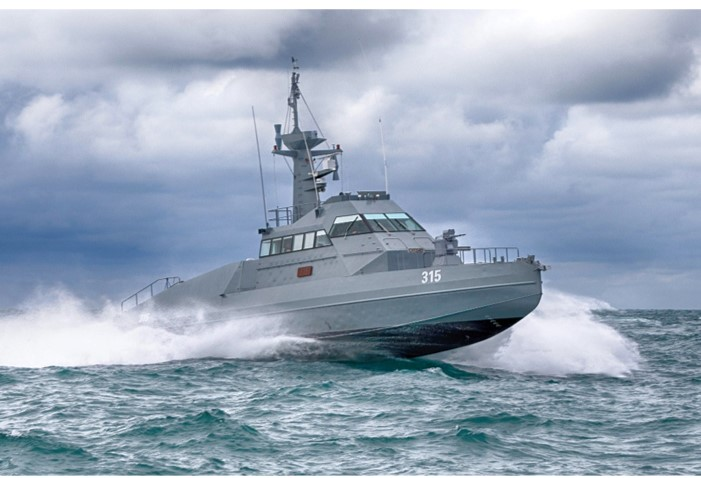
HSI32 Interceptor CMN

The shipyards delivered two warships to Saudi Arabia in 2019.

In March 2026 CMN launched the first-of-class BR71 Mk II corvette, NRA Ekuikui II (F 300), for the Angolan Navy. The BR71 Mk II was an updated version of the Baynunah-class corvettes, which is in service with the UAE Navy with six vessels as of 2026. EDGE Group’s naval part, ADSB, subcontracted the design and construction of the first and third vessels to CMN, while the second corvette will be built in Abu Dhabi by ADSB.

== Company Structure ==
CMN is part of CMN Naval, a multinational shipbuilding and yacht construction group. The group also includes shipyards such as German Naval Yards in Germany, and Isherwoods in the United Kingdom. In addition, the subsidiaries HydroQuest, AMT, and ACE are also part of CMN Naval.

== Operations ==
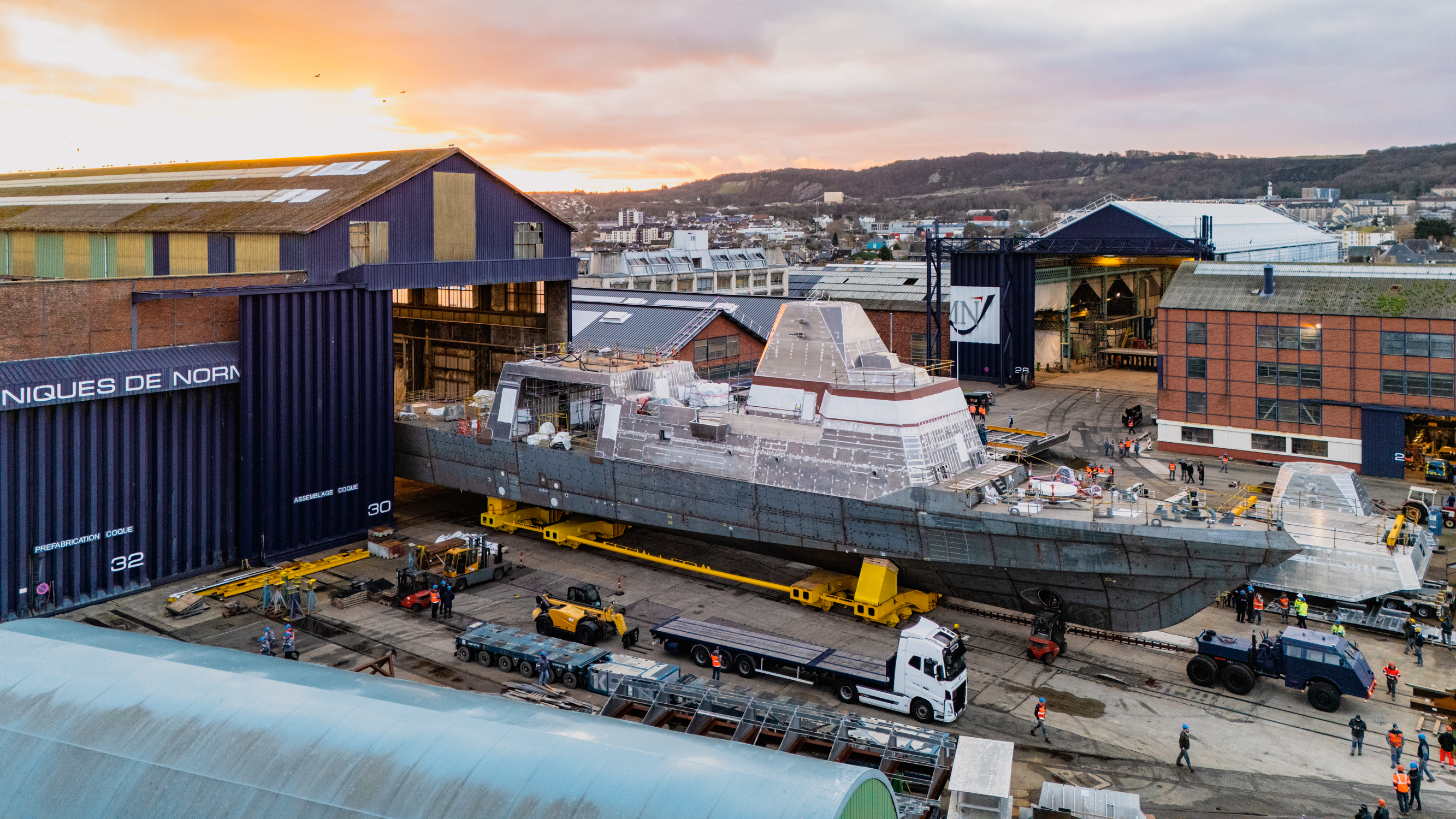
BR71 Combattante CMN Vessel

CMN builds naval vessels and research vessels and is also active in the field of marine energy through its subsidiary HydroQuest.

At its Cherbourg site, CMN has several production halls (a total of around 48,000 m^{2} of covered space, with a site area of approx. 110,000 m^{2}) as well as special facilities such as a slipway for ships under 700 tonnes and a Syncrolift with a lifting capacity of 3,000 tonnes.

== See also ==
- CMN Naval
