= List of equipment of the Islamic Revolutionary Guard Corps Navy =

This is a list of equipment of the Navy of the Islamic Revolutionary Guard Corps and does not include the vessels of the Iranian Navy.

== Principal surface combatants ==
Name	Origin	Picture	Class	Displacement	Notes
Drone carrier (1)
IRIS Shahid Bagheri	(South Korea) (Iran)		Shahid Bagheri	41,978 tons	Commissioned in February 2025 US forces sank the ship on 2 March 2026.
Corvette (6)
Shahid Soleimani	(Iran)		Shahid Soleimani-class	600 tons	Domestically built, commissioned in September 2022; Destroyed by the USMC during the 2026 Iran War.
Hassan Bagheri	(Iran)		Shahid Soleimani-class	600 tons	Domestically built, commissioned in February 2024 Sunk by US forces in March 2026.
Sayyad Shirazi	(Iran)		Shahid Soleimani-class	600 tons	Domestically built, commissioned in February 2024. Sunk by US forces on 4 March 2026.
Ra'is-Ali Delvari	(Iran)		Shahid Soleimani-class	600 tons	Domestically built, commissioned in February 2025. Sunk by US forces in March 2026.
Abu Mahdi al-Muhandis	(Iran)		Abu Mahdi al Muhandis-class	300 tons	Domestically built, commissioned in September 2022. Sunk by US forces around 10 March 2026.
IRIS Shahid Nazeri	(Iran)			800 tonnes	Domestically commissioned 13 September 2016
Fast attack craft (11)
Shahid Mahdavi Shahid Kord Shahid Shafiei Shahid Tavassoli Shahid Hojjatzadeh Shahid Dara Shahid Absalan Shahid Raeisi Shahid Golzam Shahid Sohrabi	(China)		Tondar-class	205 tons	At least one unit sunk during 2026 Iran War
Shahid Rouhi	(Iran)		Unknown	205 tons	Domestically built, commissioned in September 2022

== Amphibious ships ==
Name	Origin	Picture	Class	Displacement	Note
Landing Ship, Logistics (2)
Hejaz Karbala	(Netherlands)		Hormoz 21-class	1,280 tons	
Landing Ship, Tank (3)
Farsi Sardasht Sab Sahel	(South Korea)		Hormoz 24-class	2,014 tons	

== Auxiliary ships ==
Name	Origin	Picture	Class	Displacement	Note
Transport ship (4)
Nasser 111 Nasser 112 Nasser 113	(Iran)		Nasser-class	40 tons	
IRIS Shahid Siyavashi (2)	(Iran)		Unknown	Unknown	

== Patrol speedboat forces ==
Class	Picture	Origin	Displacement	Speed	Arms	Note
Azarakhsh (C14)		(China) (Iran)	17 tons	50 knots (93 km/h)	2 × twin launcher (Kowsar/Nasr)	Prototype delivered in 2000, commissioned in 2001, domestically built
MK-13		Unknown	Unknown	Unknown	2 × single launcher (Nasr); 2 × single 324mm torpedo tube	Possibly built by China, delivered in 2006
Peykaap I or Zoljenah (IPS-16)		(North Korea) (Iran)	13.75 tons	52 knots (96 km/h)	2 × single 324mm torpedo tube	North Korean IPS-16, first six were delivered on 8 December 2002
Bavar / Peykaap II		(Iran)	≈ 13.75 tons	≈ 52 knots (96 km/h)	2 × single launcher (Kowsar/Nasr); 2 × single 324mm torpedo tube	Modified version of North Korean IPS-16, domestically built At least three units confirmed destroyed during 2026 Iran War
Zolfaghar (Peykaap III)		(Iran)	13.75 tons	Unknown	2 × single launcher (Kowsar/Nasr)	Modified version of North Korean IPS-16, domestically built. They are supplied alongside Heidar-class boats and Meead-class boats.
Rezvan (Kashdom)		(Iran)	≈ 17.5 tons	≈ 50 knots (93 km/h)	1 × 23mm machine gun 1 × 12.7mm machine gun 1 × multiple rocket launcher (optional)	Possibly a domestic modification of Chinese C14
Tir (IPS-18)		(North Korea) (Iran)	≈ 17.5 tons	≈ 50 knots (93 km/h)	2 × single 533mm torpedo tube 1 × 12.7mm machine gun	North Korean IPS-18, first two were delivered on 8 December 2002
Pashe (MIG-G-1900)		(Iran)	30 tons	36 knots (67 km/h)	2 × 20mm cannon (80)	Modified version of American MK II, domestically built
Ghaem (MIG-S-1800)		(Iran)	60 tons	18 knots (33 km/h)	1 × Oerlikon 20mm cannon 2 × 7.62mm machine gun	Domestically built
Gahjae (Taedong-C)		(North Korea) (Iran)	≈ 7 tons	≈ 50 knots (93 km/h)	2 × torpedo tube (lightweight)	Semi-submersible naval vessel, three delivered on 8 December 2002
Kajami (Taedong-B)		(North Korea) (Iran)	≈ 30 tons	≈ 50 knots (93 km/h)	Unknown	Semi-submersible naval vessel, first two were delivered on 8 December 2002
Tarlan (Ya Mahdi)		(Iran)	8.5 tons	50 knots (93 km/h)	Unknown	Domestically built, first reported in 2005
Taregh (Boghammar)		(Sweden) (Iran)	6.4 tons	46 knots (85 km/h)	3 × 12.7mm machine gun 1 × 106mm recoilless rifle 1 × 12-barrelled 107mm rocket launcher	First ordered in 1983 and completed in 1984–85
Ashura (MIG-G-0800)		(Iran)	1.3 tons	90 knots (170 km/h)	Various: 1 × 12.7mm machine gun 1 × 12-barrelled 107mm rocket launcher	Domestically built based on design by Watercraft (UK) and manufacture of Boston Whaler
Ra'ad or Murce (MIG-G-0900)	IRGC Ra'ad	(Iran)	3.5 tons	30 knots (56 km/h)	3 × 12.7mm machine gun 1 × 106mm recoilless rifle 1 × 12-barrelled 107mm rocket launcher	
Seraj (Bladerunner)		(United Kingdom) (Iran)	1 ton	70 knots (130 km/h)	1 × DShK 12.7mm machine gun 1 × 12-barrelled 107mm rocket launcher	Domestically built, modified and armed version of British powerboat Bladerunner 51 which was acquired by Iran in 2009
Ashura-33 (FB RIB-33)		(Italy) (Iran)	1 ton	Unknown	Unknown	
MIL 40 (FB 42' STAB)		(Italy) (Iran)	6 tons	62 knots (115 km/h)	Unknown	
Cougar		(United Kingdom) (Iran)	9 tons	60 knots (110 km/h)	2 × 12.7mm machine gun	
		(Iran)	Unknown	Unknown	2 × twin ZU-23-2	13 m catamaran-hulled patrol craft
Zulfighar (Air-Defence boat)	Nearest to camera	(Iran)	16 tons	60 knots (110 km/h)	4 × Nawab missiles (VLS); 1 × 12.7mm machine gun	Based on British Bladerunner 51

== See also ==
- List of former Iranian naval vessels
- List of current ships of the Islamic Republic of Iran Navy
