= Hormuz-class vessel =

Two ship classes of the Navy of the Islamic Revolutionary Guard Corps have been named Hormuz:

- Hormuz 21 class
- Hormuz 24 class
