= IRIS Shahid Soleimani =

Iranian warship, commissioned 2022

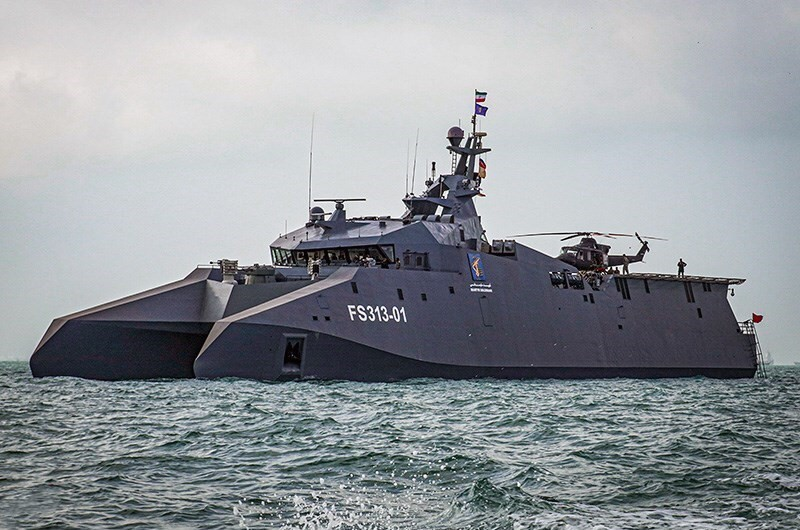
- Shahid Soleimani in 2022

History

Iran
- Name: Shahid Soleimani
- Namesake: Qasem Soleimani
- Owner: Iran
- Operator: Navy of the Islamic Revolutionary Guard Corps
- Builder: Shahid Mahallati Shipyard, Bushehr
- Commissioned: 5 September 2022
- Home port: Bandar Abbas, Iran
- Identification: Hull number: FS313-01
- Fate: Destroyed

General characteristics
- Class & type: Shahid Soleimani-class missile corvette
- Displacement: ~600 tonnes
- Length: 65.0 m (213 ft 3 in)
- Beam: 14.5 m (47 ft 7 in)
- Installed power: Diesel engine
- Propulsion: 4 × engines
- Speed: 32 knots (59 km/h)
- Range: 5,000 nmi (9,300 km)
- Sensors & processing systems: Radars and latest electronics
- Electronic warfare & decoys: Unknown EW; 2 × Chaff dispensers
- Armament: 1 × 30 mm autocannons; 4 × 20 mm gatling guns (3 barrelled); 6 × Anti-ship missiles (4 long-range, 2 mid-range); 16 × surface to air missiles (Sayad2/3 and a short-range SAM; 6 × Surface to surface missiles (Abu-Mahdi SSM)
- Aircraft carried: 1 × helicopter
- Notes: Ability to carry 3 × Fast attack boats.

IRIS Shahid Soleimani (Persian: شهید سلیمانی) was the lead ship of an Iranian class of missile corvettes with the same name. It was built by the Shahid Mahallati Shipyard and is operated by the Islamic Revolutionary Guard Corps Navy of Iran.

== History ==
After the end of construction at the Shahid Mahallati Shipyard on 14 June 2022, it underwent sea trials. At that time, it was equipped with four 12.7 mm machine guns which were later replaced with four 20 mm gatling guns.

On 5 September 2022, Shahid Soleimani was commissioned into IRGC's navy branch in a commissioning ceremony.

On 11 March 2026, US CENTCOM confirmed that all Shahid Soleimani-class corvettes were sunk or destroyed.

== Design ==
=== Hull ===
The ship has a catamaran (twin hull) design with sharp angles to give it a more stealthy design. Its design has been compared to the Chinese Type 22 missile boat and the Taiwanese Tuo Chiang class. According to Iranian officials the ship's hull is made of aluminium instead of steel which decreases the weight and is a new innovation in the Iranian shipbuilding industry.

=== Armament ===
This warship is equipped with six anti-ship cruise missiles including four long-range ones (likely Noor or Ghadir) and two short-range anti-ship missiles (likely Nasir) in an order of two long-range and one short-range box launchers on each side behind the superstructure. It is also the first Iranian warship to be equipped with a vertical launching system (VLS). Its VLS includes 6 bigger cells for surface-to-surface cruise missiles and 16 smaller ones for surface-to-air missiles all of which are located behind the command bridge. The warship Shahid Soleimani is also equipped with four 23 mm gatling guns (likely Asef), one 30 mm auto-canon and two chaff dispensers. According to Commodore Alireza Tangsiri, the Shahid Soleimani-class vessels have been equipped with different missiles with ranges of 200, 300 and 750 kilometers, as well as with a new 2,000-kilometer-range cruise missile named Ghadr-474. Tangsiri later said that Sayyad Shirazi and Hassan Baqeri are equipped with 16 Navvab vertically-launched missiles and 6 Sayyad-3 missiles.

=== Radars and electronics ===
Intelligence and reconnaissance monitoring, surface and subsurface and air traffic monitoring are among the duties of this vessel and it is equipped with Iran's most advanced electronic warfare systems.

=== Propulsion ===
Shahid Soleimani is powered by four indigenous diesel engines which gives it a top speed of 32 knots (59 km/h; 37 mph) and a range of 5,000 nautical miles (9,300 km; 5,800 mi).

=== Other equipment ===
The warship also has a helipad and a crane under it which is used to launch and retrieve fast attack boats. The ship can carry three fast attack boats and has the ability to retrieve and rearm them.

== See also ==
- IRIS Shahid Nazeri
- IRIS Abu Mahdi al-Muhandis
