= IRIS Shahid Rais-Ali Delvari =

Shahid Soleimani-class corvette

History

Iran
- Name: Shahid Rais-Ali Delvari
- Namesake: Rais-Ali Delvari
- Operator: Navy of the Islamic Revolutionary Guard Corps
- Builder: Shahid Mahallati Shipbuilding Industries
- Commissioned: 27 February 2025
- In service: 2025–Present
- Home port: Bandar Abbas
- Identification: FS313-04
- Status: Unknown

General characteristics
- Class & type: Shahid Soleimani-class corvette
- Length: 67 m (219 ft 10 in)
- Beam: 20 m (65 ft 7 in)
- Speed: 32 knots (59 km/h; 37 mph)
- Armament: 30 mm single-barreled automatic cannon; Six 20 mm Asefa Gatling guns; Sayyad-3, Qadr, Nasir and Nawab missiles

Shahid Rais-Ali Delvari is a Shahid Soleimani-class corvette manufactured by IRGC Marine Industries in Bandar Abbas. It was named after Iranian military leader and hero Rais-Ali Delvari.

== History ==
The ship was incorporated into the Southern Fleet of the Islamic Revolutionary Guard Corps Navy on February 27, 2025, during a ceremony attended by the Commander-in-Chief of the IRGC, Hossein Salami.

On 11 March 2026, the United States claimed that all IRGCN Soleimani class ships, of which this ship is one, were destroyed during 2026 Iran war. No specific details on the Shahid Rais-Ali Delvari were provided.

== Overview ==
The light missile-launching vessel, constructed in a catamaran design, is engineered for exceptional mobility in challenging sea conditions. Measuring 67 meters (219 ft 10 in) in length and 20 m (65 ft 7 in) in width, it has an empty displacement of approximately 600 tons. When fully loaded, its displacement can exceed 1,000 tons, which classifies the Shahid Soleimani class as corvettes. Shahid Rais-Ali Delvari is powered by four diesel engines, each with a capacity of 3,600 horsepower (2,700 kW), driving two shafts and propellers. This propulsion system enables the ship to achieve speeds of around 32 knots (59 km/h; 37 mph). The vessel is capable of operating over a distance of 5,000 miles.

A notable characteristic of this class is the helicopter landing deck, which measures approximately 14 meters (45 ft 11 in) in width. This feature enables the deployment of larger helicopters for various operations, including reconnaissance, search and rescue, and combat support missions. The vessel can accommodate helicopters such as the Bell 412, Bell 206, Shahed 285, and Shahed 278. Additionally, other attack helicopters like the Cobra and Toofan are also capable of functioning from this ship.

Shahid Rais-Ali Delvari, featuring a sophisticated double-hull design, is equipped for prolonged maritime endurance, essential for operations like safeguarding vessels and trade routes. Notably, prior to its formal introduction, this vessel was sent to Sharjah, United Arab Emirates, as a component of the Peace Fleet, alongside the frigate Abu Mahdi al-Muhandis, the army's armored frigate, and the support vessel Shahid Sattar of the IRGC.
