= Abu Mahdi al Muhandis-class corvette =

Iranian naval ship class

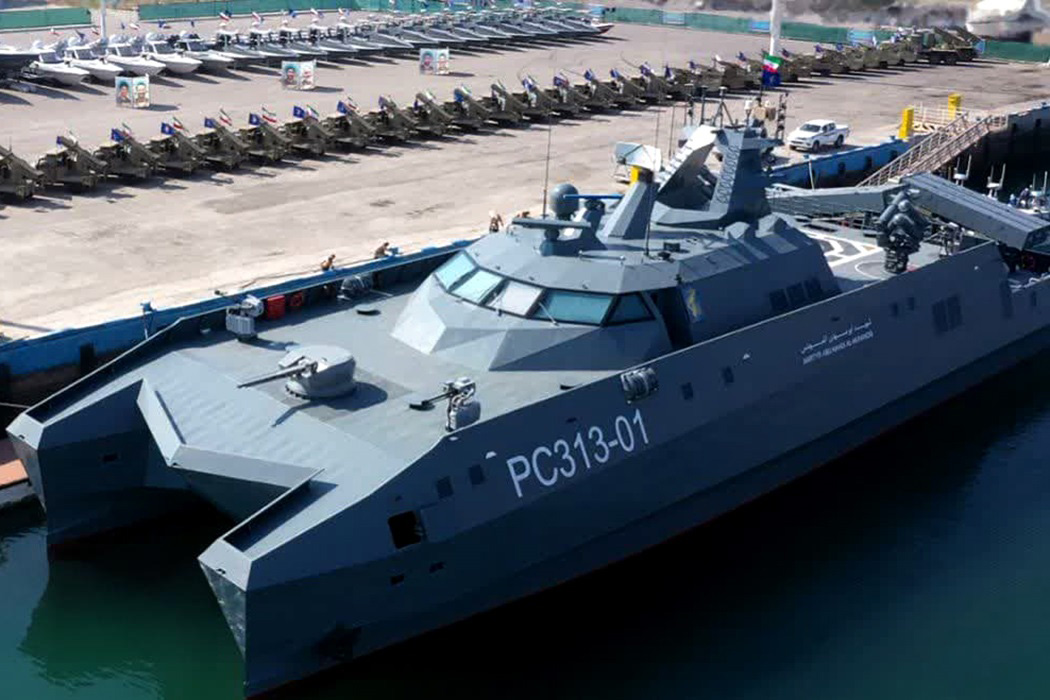
- The lead ship, Abu Mahdi al-Muhandis

Class overview
- Builders: Shahid Mahallati Shipyard, Bushehr
- Operators: Islamic Republic of Iran Navy
- Built: 2021–present
- In commission: 2023–present
- Planned: 4
- On order: 3
- Completed: 1
- Active: 0
- Lost: 1

General characteristics
- Type: Missile corvette
- Displacement: 300 tonnes (est.)
- Length: 48.0 m (157 ft 6 in)
- Beam: 12 m (39 ft 4 in)
- Installed power: Diesel engine
- Propulsion: 4 × engines
- Speed: 37 knots (69 km/h)
- Range: 2,000 nmi (3,700 km)
- Endurance: 14 days
- Sensors & processing systems: Radars and latest electronics
- Electronic warfare & decoys: Unknown EW; 2 × Chaff dispensers
- Armament: 1 × 30 mm auto-canon 2A42; 4 × 20 mm gatling guns (3 barrelled); 6 × Anti-ship cruise missiles; 8 × surface to air missiles Kosar
- Aircraft carried: VTOL drones

The Abu Mahdi al Muhandis class is a class of Iranian missile corvette. It is a missile corvette which is third in the series of indigenous high-aspect-ratio twin-hull (HARTH) class of vessel, alongside Shahid Nazeri class commissioned in 2016 and the Shahid Soleimani class commissioned in 2022 respectively. The lead ship of the class was named after Abu Mahdi al-Muhandis and was unveiled on 6 January 2024 in Bandar Abbas by Iran. However, the ship was sunk on March 10 during the 2026 Iran war. Abu Mahdi al Muhandis was the former deputy head of Iraq's Popular Mobilization Units, who was assassinated alongside Qasem Soleimani in a drone strike on 3 January 2020 by the United States. Like the other two classes of ships, this class is also in service with IRGC as principal combatant ships. As of now three more ships are planned.

== Design ==
The corvette Abu Mahdi al Muhandis, like the IRGC Shahid Soleimani-class corvettes, profits from a catamaran design and features stealth capabilities, aimed at eluding enemy detection. The Abu Mahdi al Muhandis class of HARTH ships at 300 tons are a smaller variant of Shahid Soleimani-class missile catamarans that displace 600 tons. The special design of the missile boat makes it difficult for enemy radar and reconnaissance systems to detect its presence in the waters. The ship can cruise within a 2,000-nautical-mile (3,700 km; 2,300 mi) radius without being detected by enemy radars and reconnaissance systems. However, unlike other two HARTH classes, this ship lacks aviation facilities and can only handle VTOL unmanned aerial vehicles (UAVs) like Meraj-313. The warship is designed to operate even in Sea State 6 conditions. The ship, unlike Shahid Soleimani-class missile corvettes, cannot carry three interceptor boats in its belly.

== Armament ==
The catamaran warship is equipped by various types of armaments including 30, 23, and 20 mm cannons, anti-ship guided missiles with a range of 300 km, long-range cruise missiles capable of targeting up to 750 km, and for air defense is equipped with a close range anti-aircraft system called Kowsar. The ship among other things can carry lightweight torpedoes, 6 canisters for Iranian anti-ship cruise missiles like the Noor missile, Qadir or Ghadir missile, a 30 mm 2A42 cannon, four 20 mm Gatling-type guns operating at 1,500 rpm, and 8 canisters housing Kowsar IR guided anti-ship missiles, or close-range surface-to-air missiles (SAMs), potentially enhancing its air defense. The Kowsar/SAMs launchers on the ship seem to have the capability to rotate, facilitating alignment and missile locking.

== Ships ==
Name	Laid down	Launched	Displacement	Builder	Commission	Fleet	Notes
IRIS Abu Mahdi al-Muhandis	2021	2023	300 tons	Shahid Mahallati Shipyard, Bushehr	7 January 2024	Southern Fleet	Sunk around March 10 during the 2026 Iran war.
