= Sariwon-class corvette =

1960 Soviet vessel used by North Korea

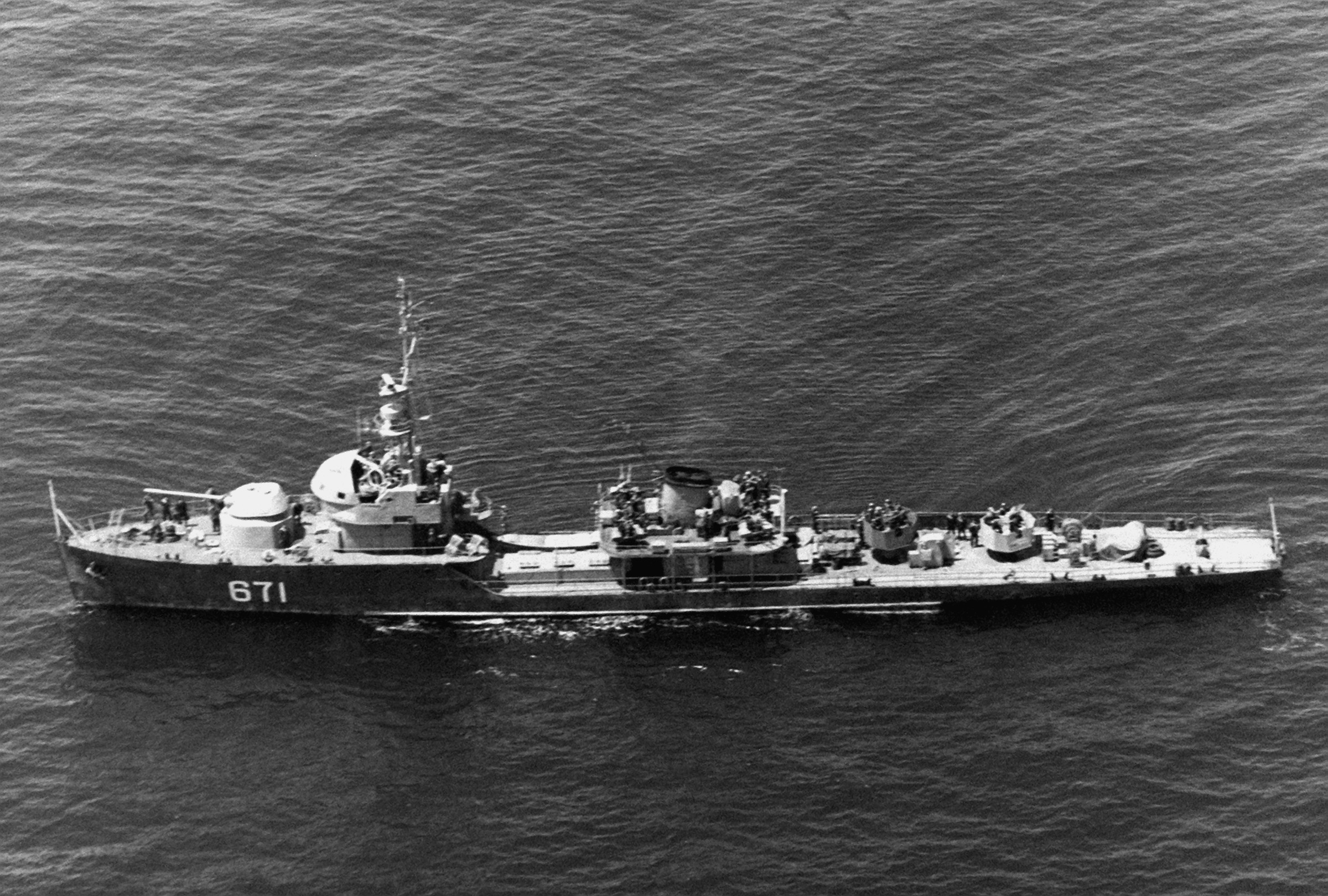
- Aerial port side view of a North Korean Navy T-Class patrol combatant. T-8 Cheka was a Project 53 Fugas or Tral Class minesweeper built in 1938 for the Soviet Navy and transferred to North Korea in December 1953.

Class overview
- Name: PG Sariwon-Class
- Builders: Unknown - built somewhere in North Korea
- Operators: KPA Naval Force
- In service: 1960s
- Completed: 5
- Active: 5

General characteristics (as per Janes)
- Type: Corvette
- Tonnage: 450 tons
- Displacement: 650 tons full load
- Length: 61.5 metres (202 ft)
- Beam: 7.5 metres (25 ft)
- Draught: 2.4 metres (7.9 ft)
- Installed power: 2 x diesel engines
- Propulsion: conventional
- Speed: 16 knots (30 km/h)
- Range: 2,700 nautical miles (5,000 km) at 16 knots (30 km/h)
- Boats & landing craft carried: One, mounted on davits in break in superstructure
- Sensors & processing systems: Surface search: ?; Navigational: Type 351 Radar
- Electronic warfare & decoys: None - only 4 x 6lbs decoy RL
- Armament: Four 57 mm/80 (2 twin); Four 37 mm/6 (2 twin); 16 14.5 mm machine guns (4 quad); Two depth charge rails; 30 RBU-1200 mines
- Notes: Based on Soviet 1930s Fugas-class Tral-type minesweeper. Ships in class include: 611, 612, 613, 614, 671

The Sariwon class corvette(사리원급 초계함) is a Soviet-designed corvette used by North Korea.

The class is based on the Soviet Fugas-class Tral type fleet minesweepers, but were built in North Korea in the 1960s. It is believed five ships of this type are currently active in the Korean People's Navy.

Stationed on the east coast, these ships were likely built at either Mayang-do Naval Shipyards or Bong Dao Bo Shipyards in nearby Sinpo on the mainland.

Believed to be the last surviving Fugas-class minesweeper, the T-8 Cheka or Kaeson (개선) in North Korean service appeared during the commissioning ceremony of North Korea's new destroyer, Kang Kon, in Wonsan in September 2026. It is expected to be preserved as a museum ship.

== See also ==
- Fugas-class minesweeper
