= IRIS Shahid Sayyad Shirazi =

Iranian warship

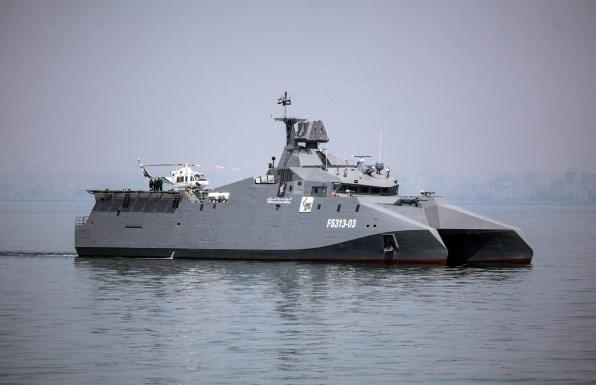

History

Iran
- Name: Shahid Sayyad Shirazi
- Namesake: Ali Sayyad Shirazi
- Operator: IRGC Navy
- Builder: Shahid Mahallati Shipbuilding Industries
- Commissioned: February 2024
- Home port: Bandar Abbas
- Identification: FS313-03
- Fate: Damaged by US airstrike, 4 March 2026
- Status: Out of service

General characteristics
- Class & type: Shahid Soleimani-class corvette
- Length: 68 m (223 ft 1 in)
- Beam: 20 m (65 ft 7 in)
- Speed: 32 knots (59 km/h)
- Boats & landing craft carried: 3 fast boats
- Armament: Combat helicopter; Navab missile system; Sayad cruise missile
- Aviation facilities: Helipad

IRIS Shahid Sayyad Shirazi is a Shahid Soleimani-class warship operated by the Islamic Revolutionary Guard Corps Navy of Iran.

== History ==
The construction of this naval vessel took place at the Specialized Naval Center in Bushehr.

The ship was unveiled on 19 February 2024 during a ceremony in Bandar Abbas, which was attended by then Chief of Staff of the Iranian Armed Forces Mohammad Bagheri and Commander of the IRGC Navy Alireza Tangsiri.

In early to mid-March 2025, Iran, Russia, and China conducted a collaborative naval exercise named Security Belt-2025, which took place near the port of Chabahar in southeastern Iran. The Islamic Revolutionary Guard Corps Navy was expected to deploy Shahid Sayyad Shirazi for this exercise.

On 4 March 2026, during the 2026 Iran war, footage released by the United States Central Command appeared to show a strike on Shahid Sayyad Shirazi. Iranian authorities did not immediately provide detailed official confirmation regarding the extent of the damage or possible casualties.

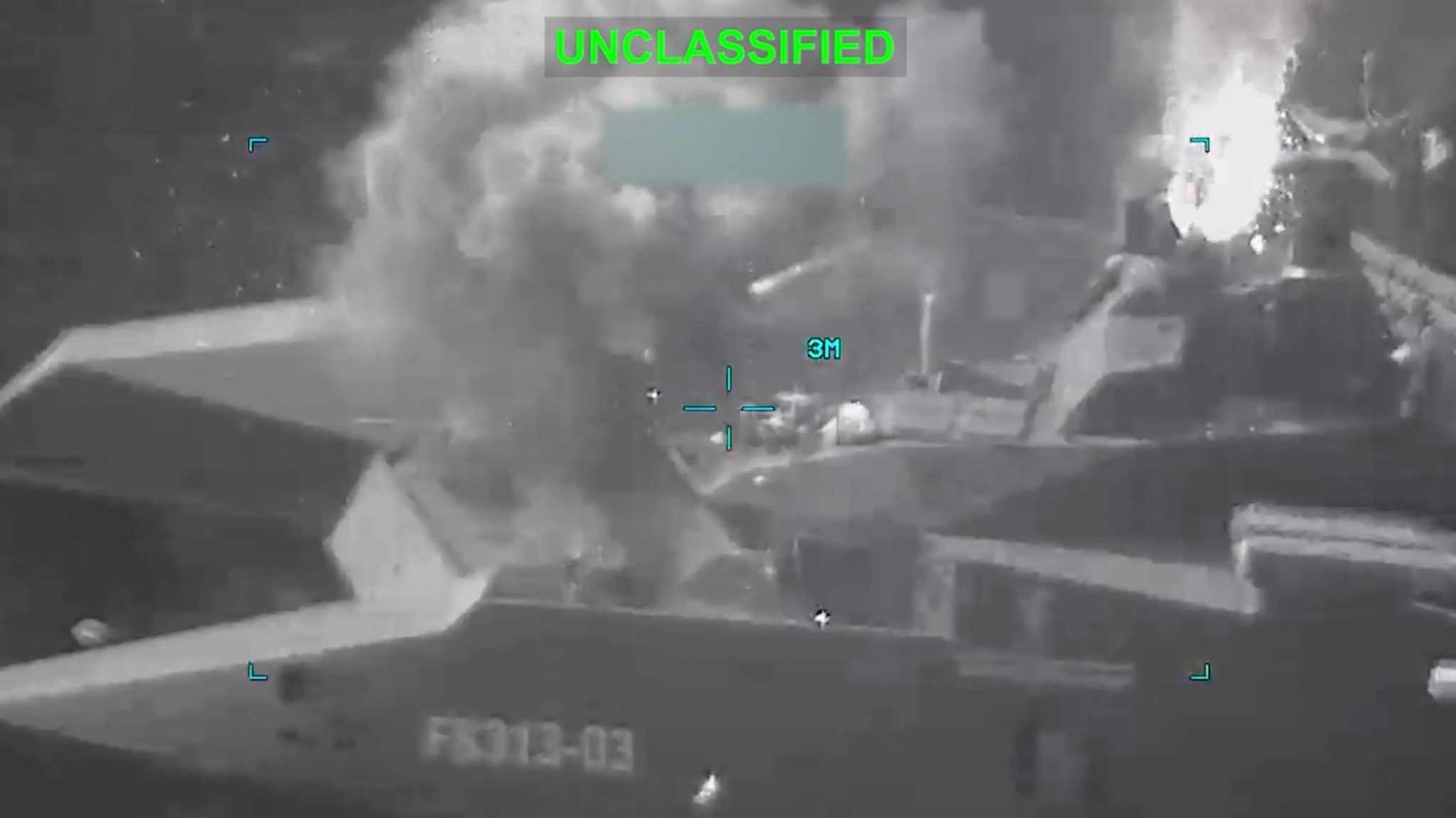
Strike on the Islamic Revolutionary Guard Corps Navy catamaran corvette IRIS Shahid Sayyad Shirazi (FS313-03) during the 2026 Iran war. Image released by United States Central Command.

Footage released by the United States Central Command appeared to show a strike on the vessel during the incident. Imagery published alongside the statement showed an explosion and fire on the deck area of a catamaran-style vessel identified as Shahid Sayyad Shirazi. According to USA the ship sunk after the strike.

== Overview ==
This domestically manufactured warship boasts several features, including stealth capabilities that reduce its detection by enemy radar and detection systems, as well as the capacity to patrol an area spanning 5,500 nautical miles (10,200 km; 6,300 mi). Measuring 67 meters (220 ft) in length, 20 m (66 ft) in width, and displacing 600 tons, Shahid Sayyad Shirazi is powered by four engines and has the capability to accommodate a combat helicopter. They can also deploy with three rocket-armed fast boats. Designed in a catamaran style for oceanic operations, it can achieve a maximum speed of 45 knots (83 km/h; 52 mph).

Additionally, the ship is outfitted with the Nawab missile system featuring vertical launch capabilities, as well as the Sayad cruise missile, which has a range of 700 kilometers (430 mi).

== See also ==
- IRIS Hassan Bagheri
- IRIS Shahid Nazeri
