= Shahid Soleimani-class corvette =

Iranian warship class, commissioned 2022

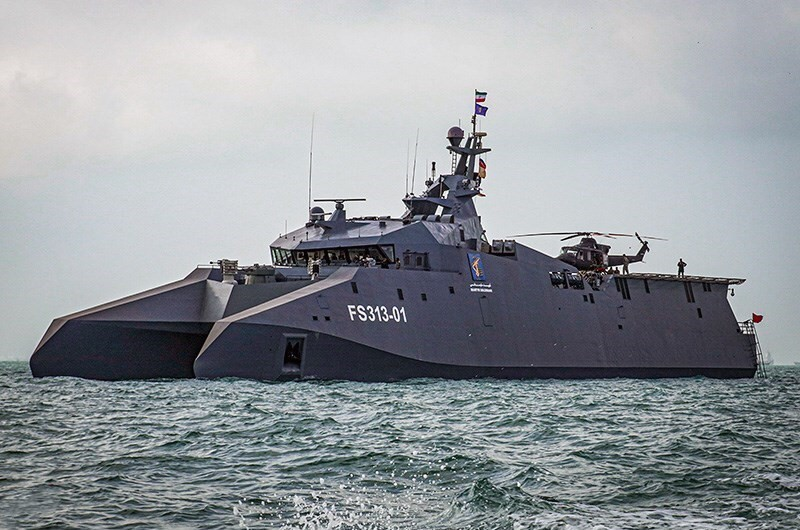
- The lead ship, Shahid Soleimani, in 2022

Class overview
- Builders: Shahid Mahallati Shipyard, Bushehr
- Operators: IRGC-Navy
- Built: 2022–present
- In commission: 2022–present
- Planned: 4+
- Completed: 4
- Active: 0
- Lost: 4

General characteristics
- Type: Missile corvette
- Displacement: ~600 tonnes
- Length: 65.0 m (213 ft 3 in)
- Beam: 14.5 m (47 ft 7 in)
- Installed power: Diesel engine
- Propulsion: 4 × engines
- Speed: 32 knots (59 km/h)
- Range: 5,000 nmi (9,300 km)
- Sensors & processing systems: Radars and latest electronics
- Electronic warfare & decoys: EW; 2 × Chaff dispensers
- Armament: 1 × 30 mm autocannon; 6 × 20 mm gatling guns (3 barrelled); 6 × Anti-ship cruise missiles (4 long-range, 2 mid-range); 16 × surface to air missiles (Sayad2/3 and a short-range SAM; 6 × Surface to surface missiles (Abu-Mahdi SSM)
- Armour: kevlar BPV
- Aircraft carried: 1 × helicopter
- Notes: Ability to carry 3 × fast attack boats

The Shahid Soleimani class (Persian: شهید سلیمانی) were the principal surface combatant ships of the Islamic Revolutionary Guard Corps Navy of Iran. These were an Iranian class of missile corvettes and bore the name of Qasem Soleimani, a prominent Iranian military officer, who was the commander of Islamic Revolutionary Guard Corps Quds Force from 1998, until he was assassinated on 3 January 2020 by the United States in Baghdad, Iraq alongside Abu Mahdi al-Muhandis. These ships were being built by various shipyards in Bushehr, Qeshm and Bandar Abbas and were operated by the IRGC Navy.

== Design ==
=== Hull ===
These ships are known for their unique catamaran (twin hull) design with sharp angles for a more stealthy design. The design has been compared to the Chinese Type 22 missile boat and the Taiwanese Tuo Chiang class. According to Iranian officials, these warships have aluminum hulls instead of the regular steel, which decreases their weight. The use of aluminum is an innovation in the Iranian shipbuilding industry, adopted in the past few years.

=== Armament ===
These warships are equipped with six anti-ship cruise missiles including four long-range ones (likely Noor or Ghadir) and two short-range anti-ship missiles (likely Nasir). Two long-range and one short-range box launchers are on each side behind the superstructure. These warships are the first Iranian warship to be equipped with a vertical launching system (VLS). The VLS armament component includes six bigger cells for surface-to-surface cruise missiles and 16 smaller ones for surface-to-air missiles, all located behind the command bridge.

The lead warship, Shahid Soleimani, was equipped with six 23 mm gatling guns (likely Asef), one 30 mm autocannon and two chaff dispensers. These are also incorporated in other warships of the class. According to Commodore Alireza Tangsiri, Shahid Soleimani-class vessels have been equipped with different types of missiles, with ranges of 200, 300 and 750 kilometers respectively, and a new 2,000-kilometer-range cruise missile named Ghadr-474, to boost their firepower. Tangsiri later said that Sayyad Shirazi and Hassan Baqeri, the other two warships of the class, were equipped with 16 Navvab vertically-launched missiles and 6 Sayyad-3 missiles.

=== Radars and electronics ===
Intelligence and reconnaissance monitoring, surface and subsurface and air traffic monitoring are among the duties of these vessels and are equipped with Iran's most advanced electronic warfare systems. The main fire-control radars of the built ships are yet to be installed.

=== Propulsion ===
The Shahid Soleimani class of warship were powered by four indigenously developed diesel engines, which gives a top speed of 32 knots (59 km/h; 37 mph) and a range of 5,000 nautical miles (9,300 km; 5,800 mi).

=== Other equipment ===
The warship has aviation facilities, a helipad, and a crane to launch and retrieve fast attack boats. The ships can carry three fast attack boats, and have the ability to retrieve and rearm them.

== History ==
After the end of construction at the Shahid Mahallati Shipyard in June 2022, the lead ship IRIS Shahid Soleimani, underwent rigorous sea trials. During sea trials, the lead ship was equipped with four 12.7 mm machine guns which were later replaced with four 20 mm gatling guns. On 5 September 2022, Shahid Soleimani was commissioned into IRGC's navy branch in a commissioning ceremony.

A screenshot of footage from the strike on the IRIS Shirazi, showing its hull number FS313-03

IRIS Shahid Sayyad Shirazi (FS313-03) was damaged in strikes by United States Armed Forces on 3 March 2026, during the 2026 Iran war. In a post made to X on 4 March, United States Central Command said that it had struck IRIS Shahid Sayyad Shirazi (FS313-03) on the previous night. That same day, U.S. Secretary of Defense Pete Hegseth announced that the Soleimani, and not the Shirazi, had been not only damaged but destroyed. This was likely a confusion of the ship's class and name as images released of the strike show the hull numbers of the Shirazi.

On 11 March 2026, CENTCOM stated that all IRGCN Soleimani class ships were destroyed by the United States during the 2026 Iran war.

== Ships in class ==
List of Shahid-Soleimani-class corvettes
| Ship | Hull No. | Commissioned | Homeport | Status |
|---|---|---|---|---|
| Shahid Soleimani | FS313-01 | 2022 | Bandar Abbas | Destroyed |
| Hassan Bagheri | FS313-02 | 2024 | Bandar Abbas | Destroyed |
| Shahid Sayyad Shirazi | FS313-03 | 2024 | Bandar Abbas | Destroyed |
| Shahid Rais-Ali Delvari | FS313-04 | 2025 | Bandar Abbas | Destroyed |

== See also ==
- IRIS Shahid Nazeri
- IRIS Abu Mahdi al-Muhandis
