= Ashura-class speedboat =

Iranian class of patrol boat

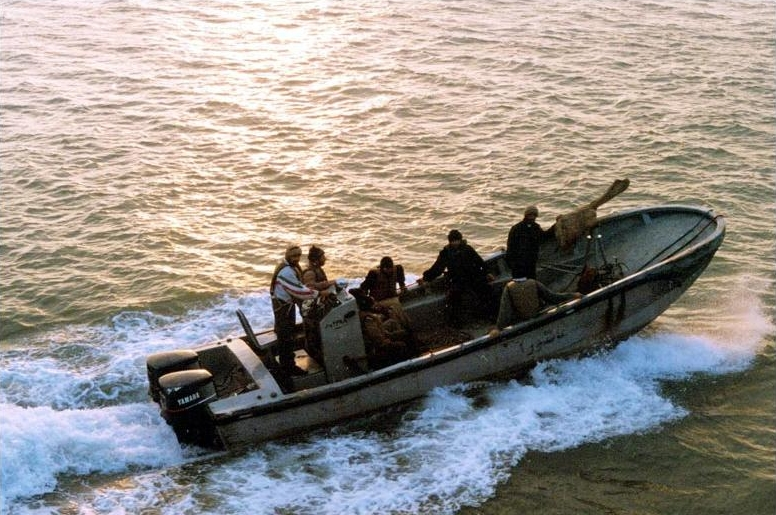

Class overview
- Builders: Marine Industries Organization
- Operators: Navy of the Islamic Revolutionary Guard Corps; Islamic Republic of Iran Navy; Sudanese Armed Forces

General characteristics
- Type: Fast patrol boat
- Displacement: 1 ton full load
- Length: 6.7 m (22 ft 0 in)
- Beam: 2.3 m (7 ft 7 in)
- Draught: 0.4 m (1 ft 4 in)
- Installed power: Diesel
- Propulsion: 2 × outboard engines, 240 horsepower (0.18 MW)
- Speed: 90 knots (170 km/h) (estimate)
- Complement: 4
- Armament: Various, including: 1 × 12.7mm machine gun; 1 × 107mm 12-barelled MRL

The Ashura (Persian: عاشورا, also known as MIG-G-0800) is a class of fast patrol boat used by naval forces of Iran. It is a Boston Whaler type vessel based on a Watercraft UK design, and is manufactured domestically with hulls made of glass-reinforced plastic.

== Types ==
Ashura speedboats are able to carry various guns, including heavy machine guns and multiple rocket launchers. There are versions with installed ZU-23-2 autocannon, DShK machine gun, and modified to carry a single naval mine.

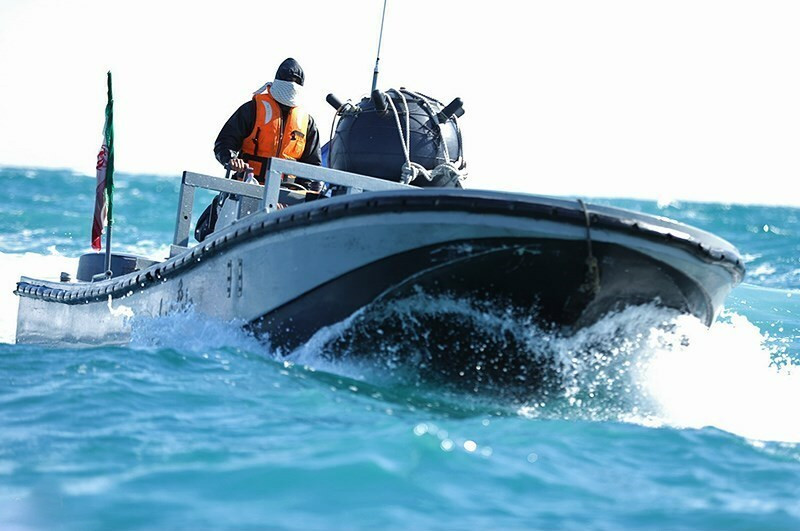
Minelayer version

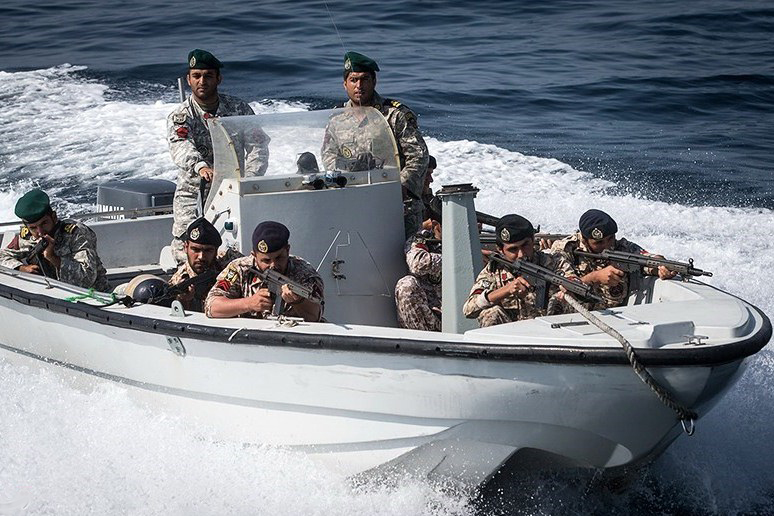
Trooper version

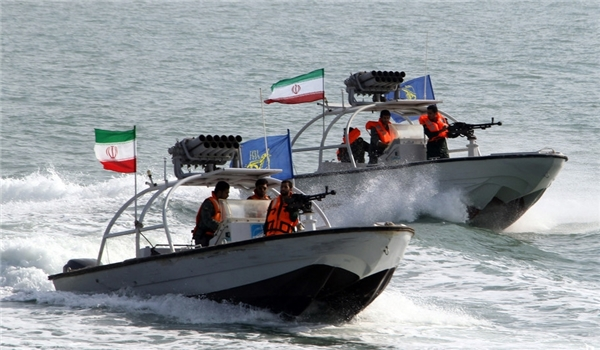
MLR and machine gun equipped version

== Export ==
From 1992 to 1994, Sudan purchased at least seven Ashura boats from Iran.
