= Zolfaghar-class vessel =

Two ship classes of the Navy of the Islamic Revolutionary Guard Corps have been named Zolfaghar:

- Peykaap III-class missile boat
- Kajami-class torpedo boat
