= Nasser-class ship =

Iranian class of auxiliary ships

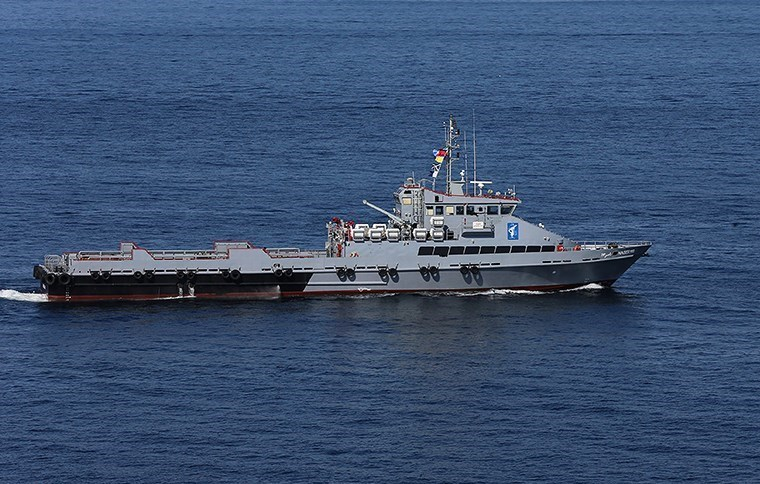

Class overview
- Builders: Arvandan Shipbuilding Co.
- Operators: Navy of the Islamic Revolutionary Guard Corps

General characteristics
- Type: Auxiliary ship
- Displacement: 35 tons of supplies
- Length: 33 m (108 ft 3 in)
- Beam: 8 m (26 ft 3 in)
- Draught: 1.5 m (4 ft 11 in)
- Installed power: Diesel
- Propulsion: 2 × diesel engines; 2 × shafts
- Speed: 27 knots (50 km/h)
- Complement: 86 troops
- Armament: 1 × 12.7mm machine gun

Nasser (Persian: ناصر, lit. 'helper') is a class of auxiliary ships built by Iranian shipyard Arvandan and operated by the Navy of the Islamic Revolutionary Guard Corps.

== Type ==
Arvandan Shipbuilding Co., the manufacturer of these vessels, is a civilian shipyard that specializes in light passenger ferries. According to Jane's Fighting Ships, the ships in the class are yard auxiliary general (YAG), while the International Institute for Strategic Studies classifies them as transport ship (AP). The U.S. Navy has variously described the class as "auxiliary patrol vessel" or "light personnel transport".

== Design ==
=== Dimensions and machinery ===
The class design is 33 m (108 ft) long, would have a beam of 8 m (26 ft) and a draft of 1.5 m (4 ft 11 in). It uses two shafts coupled with two diesel engines that provide power for a top speed of 27 knots (50 km/h). Nasser vessels can carry 86 troops or 35 tons of supplies.

=== Armament ===
Joseph Trevithick, a fellow at GlobalSecurity.org, says the vessels seem "lightly armed", adding that it "did not necessarily mean it might not have been threatening". Trevithick also opines that they could be used as minelayers. The 2015 edition of Jane's mentions that the ships are equipped with one 12.7mm machine gun, as well as unknown electro-optic systems.

== Ships in the class ==
Known ships of the class include:

Name	Hull №	Code letters	Commissioned	Status
Unknown	111	Unknown	Unknown	In service
Unknown	112	Unknown	Unknown	In service
Unknown	113	Unknown	March 2011	In service
Unknown	114	Unknown	Unknown	In service
Unknown	115	Unknown	Unknown	In service
Shahid Nasserinejad	116		Unknown	In service
Shahid Basir	TBD	TBD	TBD	Under construction
