= Tondar-class fast attack craft =

Class of attack boats

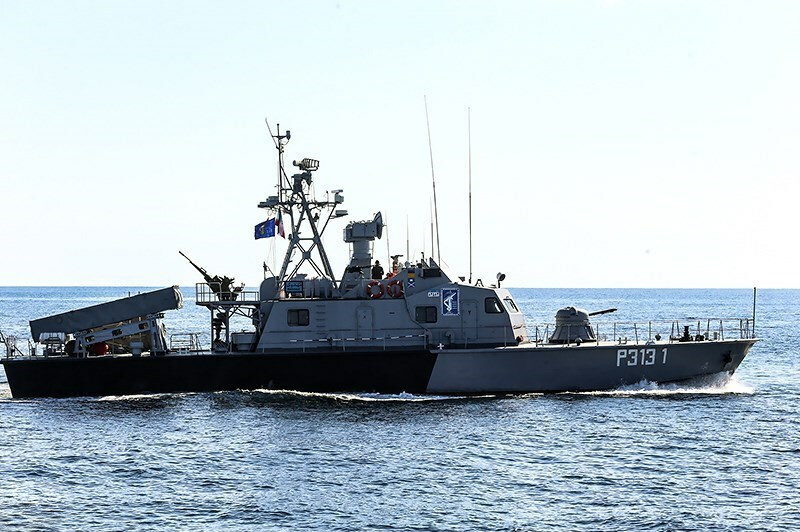

Class overview
- Builders: Zhanjiang Shipyard, China
- Operators: Navy of the Islamic Revolutionary Guard Corps
- Preceded by: Type 021-class missile boat
- Built: 1991–1996
- In service: 1994–present
- Planned: 10
- Completed: 10
- Active: 10

General characteristics
- Type: Fast attack craft
- Displacement: 174 tons standard; 208 tons full load
- Length: 38.6 m (126 ft 8 in)
- Beam: 6.8 m (22 ft 4 in)
- Draught: 2.7 m (8 ft 10 in)
- Installed power: Diesel
- Propulsion: 3 × diesel engines, 8,025 horsepower (5.984 MW); 3 × shafts
- Speed: 35 knots (65 km/h)
- Complement: 3 officers and 25 sailors
- Sensors & processing systems: Active radar homing; SR-47A surface search radar; RM 1070-A navigation system; Type 341 Radar
- Armament: 2 × twin missile launchers; 2 × twin AK-230 guns; 2 × twin 23mm guns

The Tondar class (Persian: تندر, lit. 'thunder', also known as Houdong class) consists of ten fast attack crafts operated by Navy of the Islamic Revolutionary Guard Corps of Iran.

== History ==
The negotiations to sign a contract for the vessels started in 1991, but was delayed for some time over the type of missiles installed on the ships. The ships were manufactured at Zhanjiang Shipyard, China and were delivered to Iran in two batches, the first five in September 1994 and the remaining in March 1996.

== Design ==
=== Dimensions and machinery ===
The ships have a standard displacement of 174 tonnes (171 long tons) and 208 t (205 long tons) at full load. The class design is 38.6 m (127 ft) long, would have a beam of 6.8 m (22 ft) and a draft of 2.7 m (8 ft 10 in) and would have used three propeller shafts, powered by three diesel engines. This system was designed to provide 8,025 horsepower (5.984 MW) for a top speed of 35 knots (65 km/h).

=== Armament ===
According to the 2020 edition of "The Military Balance" published by the IISS, the ships are equipped with two twin launchers that fire Iranian-made AShM, Ghader. 2015–16 version of Jane's Fighting Ships however, had reported that the ships carry four Noor missiles. The missiles rely on active radar homing to 120 kilometres (65 nmi) at 0.9 Mach.

The close-in weapon system on the ships consists of two 30mm/65 twin AK-230 guns, while the secondary armament is two 23mm/87 twin guns.

=== Sensors and processing systems ===
Tondar-class vessels use Chinese SR-47A surface search radar and RM 1070-A navigation system, both working on I-band. For fire control, they use Type 341 Radar (also known as Rice Lamp) on I/J-band.

== Ships in the class ==
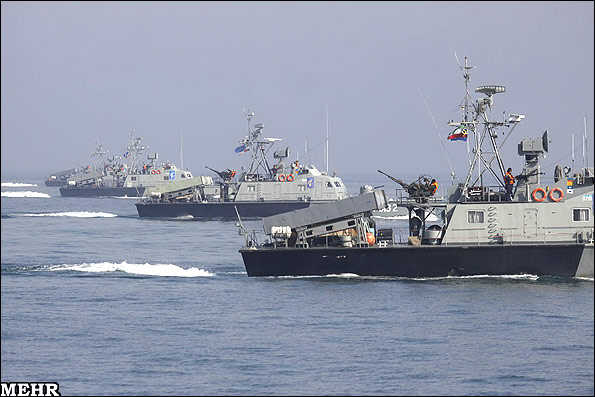
Four ships in the class sailing in formation

The ships in the class which were renamed in c. 2006, are:

Ship	Namesake	Pennant number	Commissioned	Status
Shahid Mahdavi (ex-Fath)	Nader Mahdavi	P313-1 (ex 301)	September 1994	In service
Shahid Kord (ex-Nasr)	Bijan Kord	P313-2 (ex 302)	September 1994	In service
Shahid Shafiei (ex-Saf)	Nasrollah Shafiei	P313-3 (ex 303)	September 1994	In service
Shahid Tavassoli (ex-Ra'd)	Gholam-Hossein Tavassoli	P313-4 (ex 304)	September 1994	In service
Shahid Hojjatzadeh (ex-Fajr)		P313-5 (ex 305)	September 1994	In service
Shahid Dara (ex-Shmas)	Eshagh Dara	P313-6 (ex 306)	March 1996	In service
Shahid Absalan (ex-Me'raj)	Khodadad Absalan	P313-7 (ex 307)	March 1996	In service
Shahid Raeisi (ex-Falaq)	Asadollah Raeisi	P313-8 (ex 308)	March 1996	In service
Shahid Golzam (ex-Hadid)		P313-9 (ex 309)	March 1996	In service
Shahid Sohrabi (ex-Qadr)		P313-10 (ex 310)	March 1996	In service
