= Hormuz 24-class landing ship =

Class of landing ship tank

Hormoz 24-class landing ship
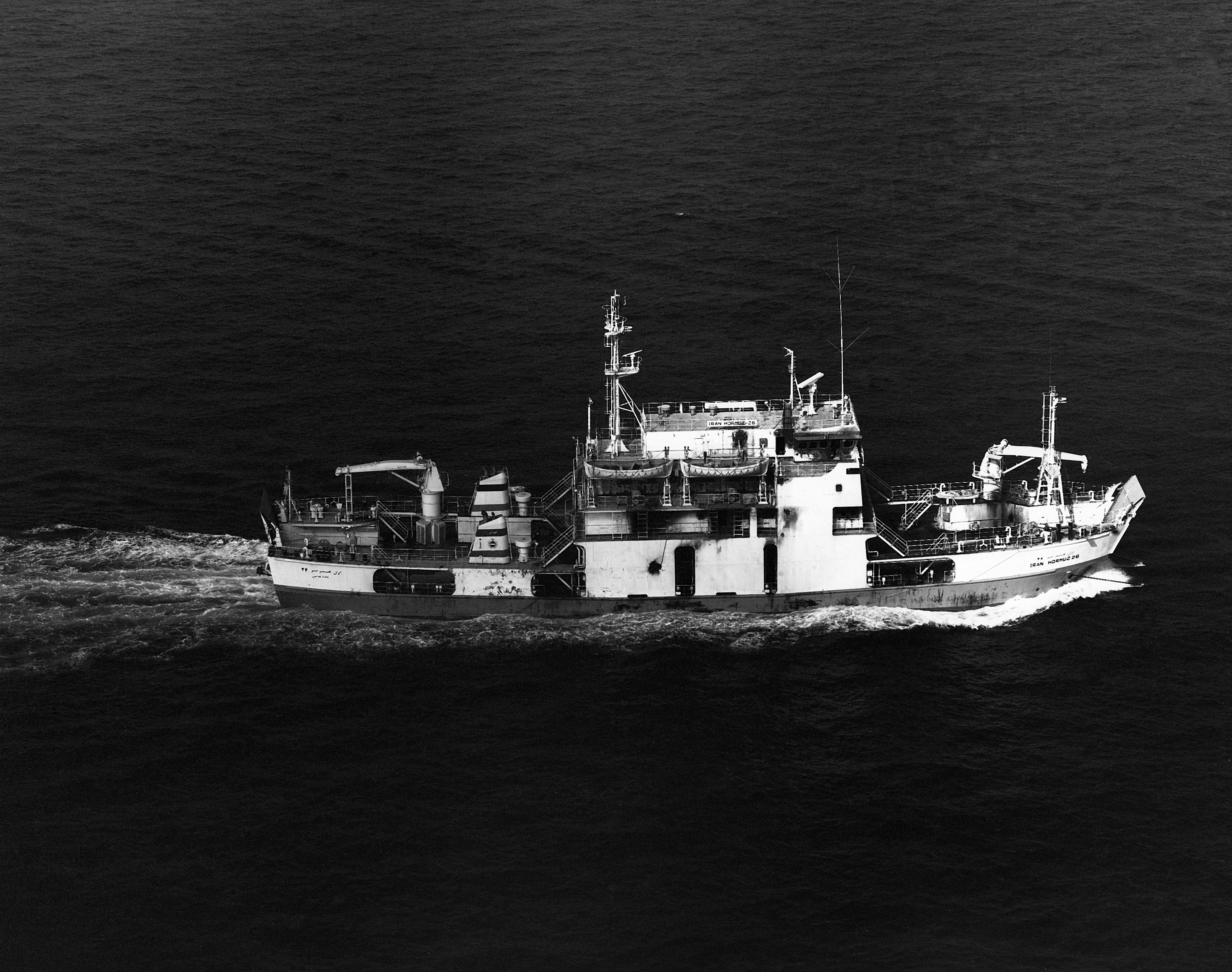

Class overview
- Operators: Navy of the Islamic Revolutionary Guard Corps
- Built: 1985–1986
- Completed: 3
- Active: 3

General characteristics
- Type: Landing ship, tank
- Displacement: 2,046 tons full load
- Length: 73.1 m (239 ft 10 in)
- Beam: 14.2 m (46 ft 7 in)
- Draught: 2.5 m (8 ft 2 in)
- Installed power: Diesel
- Propulsion: 2 × Daihatsu 6DLM-22 engines, 2,400 horsepower (1.8 MW); 2 × shafts
- Speed: 12 knots (22 km/h)

Iran Hormoz 24 (Persian: ایران هرمز ۲۴) is a class of landing ship tank operated by the Navy of the Islamic Revolutionary Guard Corps.

== History ==
The vessels were built at a shipyard in Inchon, South Korea between 1985 and 1986. The vessels are reportedly registered as merchant ships in official documents. All three were launched on 20 December 1985, and were given placeholder names Hormoz 24, Hormoz 25 and Hormoz 26.

== Description ==
Having 110 spare berthings, Hormoz 24 vessels are able to carry 9 tanks or 140 troops.

== Ships in the class ==
The vessels of this class in IRGC service are:

Ship	Namesake	Hull number	Status
Farsi	Farsi Island	24	In service
Sardasht	Sardasht	25	In service
Sab Sahel	Unknown	26	In service
