= Hormuz 21-class landing ship =

Military landing craft

Hormoz 21-class landing ship
Class overview
- Builders: Ravestein B.V., Netherlands
- Operators: Navy of the Islamic Revolutionary Guard Corps
- Built: 1984–1985
- Completed: 2
- Active: 2

General characteristics
- Type: Landing ship
- Displacement: 1,301 tons full load
- Length: 65 m (213 ft 3 in)
- Beam: 12 m (39 ft 4 in)
- Draught: 2.6 m (8 ft 6 in)
- Installed power: Diesel
- Propulsion: 2 × MWM TBD 604 V12 or MAN V12V-12.5/14 engines, 1,460 horsepower (1.09 MW); 2 × shafts
- Speed: 9 knots (17 km/h)

Iran Hormoz 21 (Persian: ایران هرمز ۲۱, also known as MIG-S-5000) is a class of landing ship tank (LST) or landing craft tank (LCT) operated by the Navy of the Islamic Revolutionary Guard Corps.

== History ==
Two of these ships were ordered to Ravestein B.V. shipyard in Deest, Netherlands for civilian use, and were built between 1984 and 1985. The Marine Industries Organization has built the class ingeniously, but all of its products are in commercial use. One was launched in mid-1995 and another in 1997.

== Ships in the class ==
The vessels of this class in IRGC service are:

Ship	Namesake	Hull number	Status
Hejaz	Hejaz	21	In service
Karbala	Karbala	22	In service
