= IRIS Abu Mahdi al-Muhandis =

Iranian missile corvette

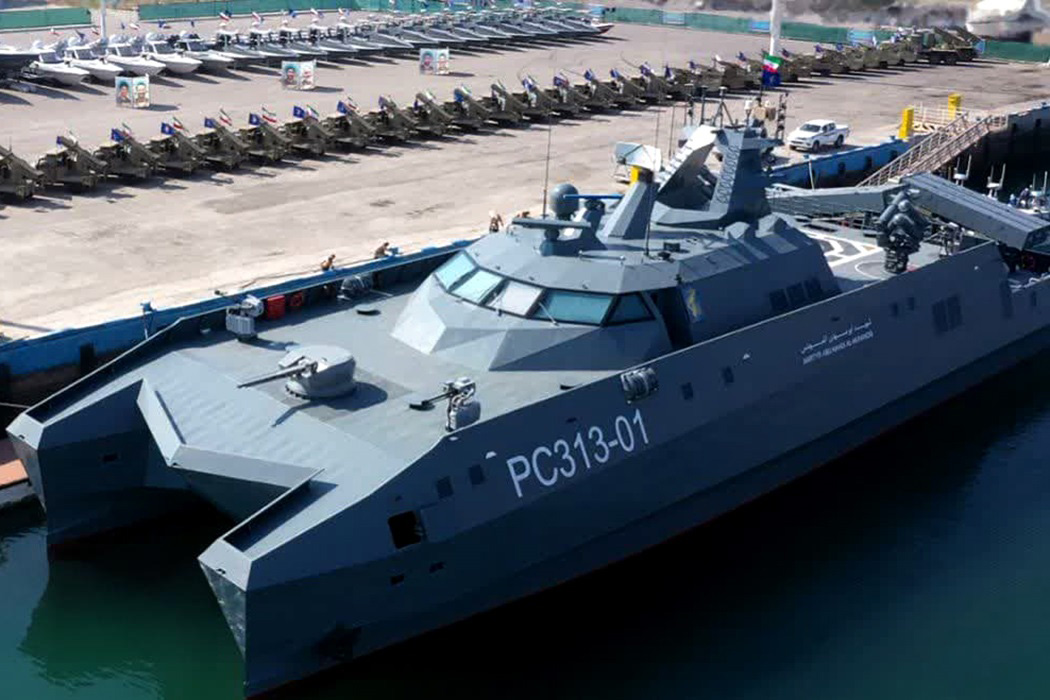
- Abu Mahdi Al-Muhandis

History

Iran
- Name: Abu Mahdi al-Muhandis
- Namesake: Abu Mahdi al-Muhandis
- Owner: Iran
- Operator: Navy of the Islamic Revolutionary Guard Corps
- Builder: Shahid Mahallati Shipyard, Bushehr
- In service: 2024–2026
- Home port: Bandar Abbas, Iran
- Fate: Sunk during the 2026 Iran war
- Status: Destroyed
- Notes: Hull number: PC313-01

General characteristics
- Type: Missile corvette
- Displacement: 300 tonnes
- Length: 48.0 m (157 ft 6 in)
- Beam: 12 m (39 ft 4 in)
- Installed power: Diesel engine
- Propulsion: 4 × engines
- Speed: 37 knots (69 km/h)
- Range: 2,000 nmi (3,700 km)
- Endurance: 14 days
- Sensors & processing systems: Radars and latest electronics
- Electronic warfare & decoys: Unknown EW; 2 × Chaff dispensers
- Armament: 1 × 30 mm autocannon 2A42; 4 × 20 mm rotary cannons (3 barrelled); 6 × anti-ship missiles; 8 × surface to air missiles Kosar
- Aircraft carried: VTOL drones

IRIS Abu Mahdi al-Muhandis was an Iranian missile corvette with hull number PC313-01. It was the lead ship of the Abu Mahdi al-Muhandis class of missile corvettes. It is the third indigenous high-aspect-ratio twin-hull (HARTH) class of vessel unveiled on 6 January 2024 in Bandar Abbas by Iran after the Shahid Nazeri class commissioned in 2016 and Shahid Soleimani class commissioned in 2022. The lead ship was named after Abu Mahdi al-Muhandis who was the former deputy head of Iraq's Popular Mobilization Units, and was assassinated alongside Qasem Soleimani in the US drone strike on 3 January 2020. Like the other two classes of ships, this ship was also in service with IRGC.

== Design ==
Abu Mahdi al-Muhandis, like the Shahid Soleimani-class corvettes profits from a catamaran design and features stealth capabilities, aimed at eluding enemy detection, but is half the size of the latter. The special design of the missile boat makes it difficult for enemy radar and reconnaissance systems to detect its presence in the waters. Unlike the other two HARTH classes in service with IRGC, this ship lacks proper aviation facility and can only handle VTOL unmanned aerial vehicles (UAVs).

== 2026 Iran War ==
On 11 March 2026, CENTCOM released video of the ship's destruction during a US airstrike, while she was pierside.
