= Nasir (missile) =

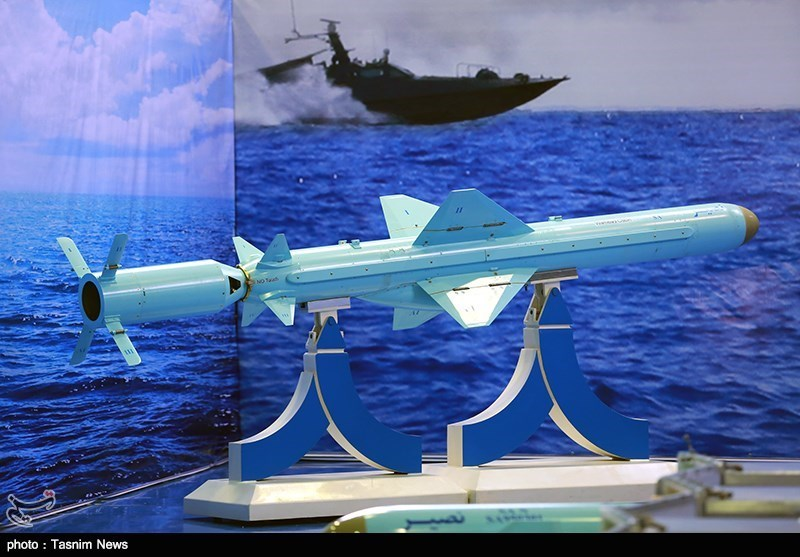
- A Nasir display model
- Type: Cruise missile
- Place of origin: Iran

Service history
- In service: 2017-present

Production history
- Designer: Ministry of Defence and Armed Forces Logistics (Iran)
- Manufacturer: Ministry of Defence and Armed Forces Logistics (Iran)

Specifications
- Mass: 351 kg
- Diameter: 180 mm
- Effective firing range: 90 km
- Warhead weight: 130 kg
- Maximum speed: Mach 0.8
- Guidance system: Active radar

The Nasir (Persian: نصیر) is an Iranian cruise missile. It is manufactured by the Ministry of Defence and Armed Forces Logistics (Iran).

== History ==
The Nasir was formally unveiled on 15 April 2017 during the survey of Iran's president from the exhibition of the achievements of the Ministry of Defense on 22 April 2017. It was handed over in bulk to the Islamic Revolutionary Guard Corps on 2 May 2017.

The Nasir was tested in a field exercise known as Welayat-95 in 2017.

== Design ==
The Nasir can be used as a coast-to-sea or sea-to-sea cruise missiles. According to IRGC Air Force officer Hossein Dehghan, it can be mounted on speedboats, be prepared quickly for launch, enjoys high precision, and has an advanced radar system.

=== Variants ===
The CM-90 is an export model of the Nasir.

== Operators ==
- Iran: Used by the Iranian Navy and the IRGC Navy.
- Venezuela: Uses the CM-90 version for the Venezuelan Navy.
