= Corvette =

Small warship

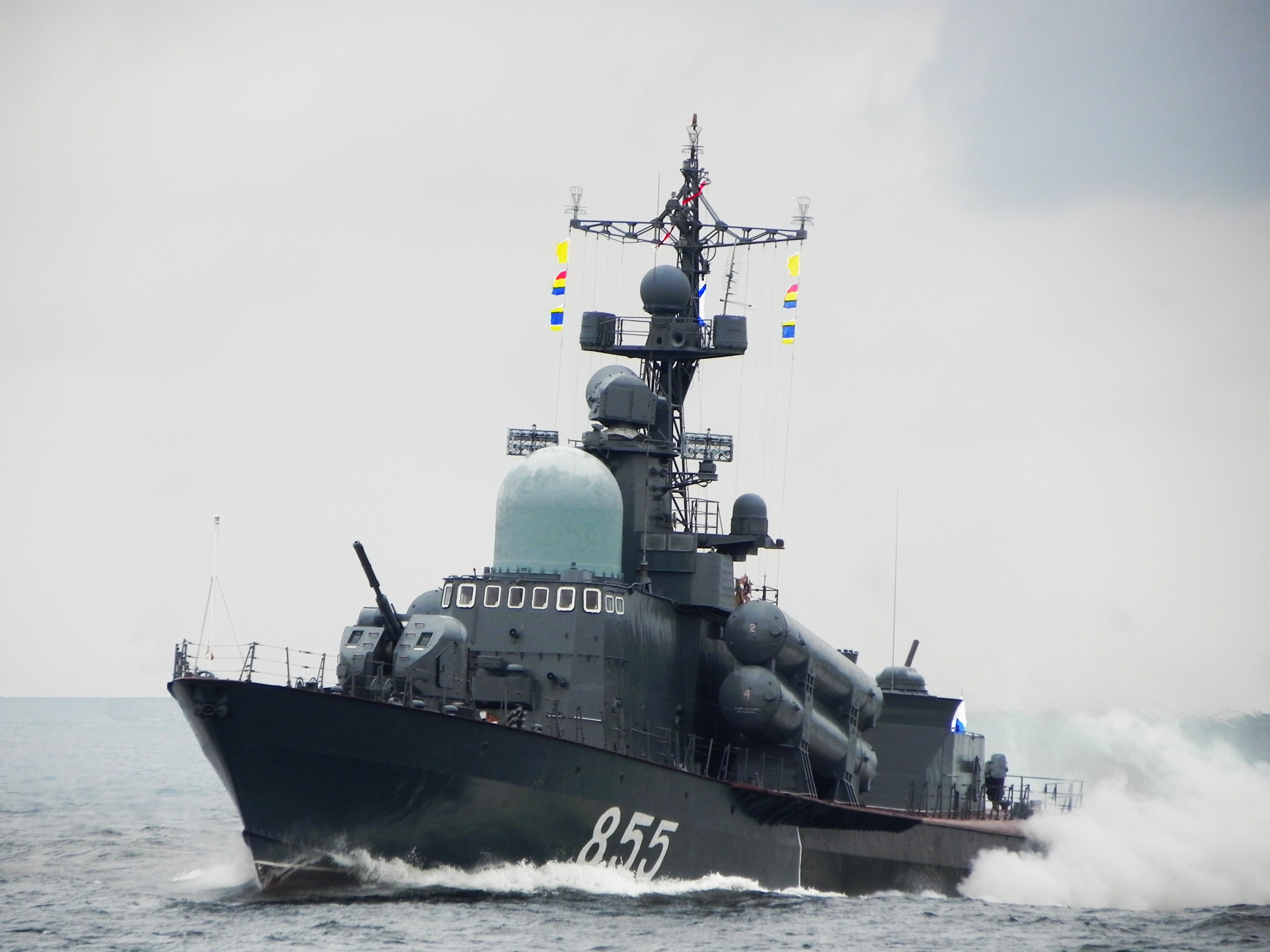
The Tarantul class and its variants are the most widely used corvettes in the 21st century.

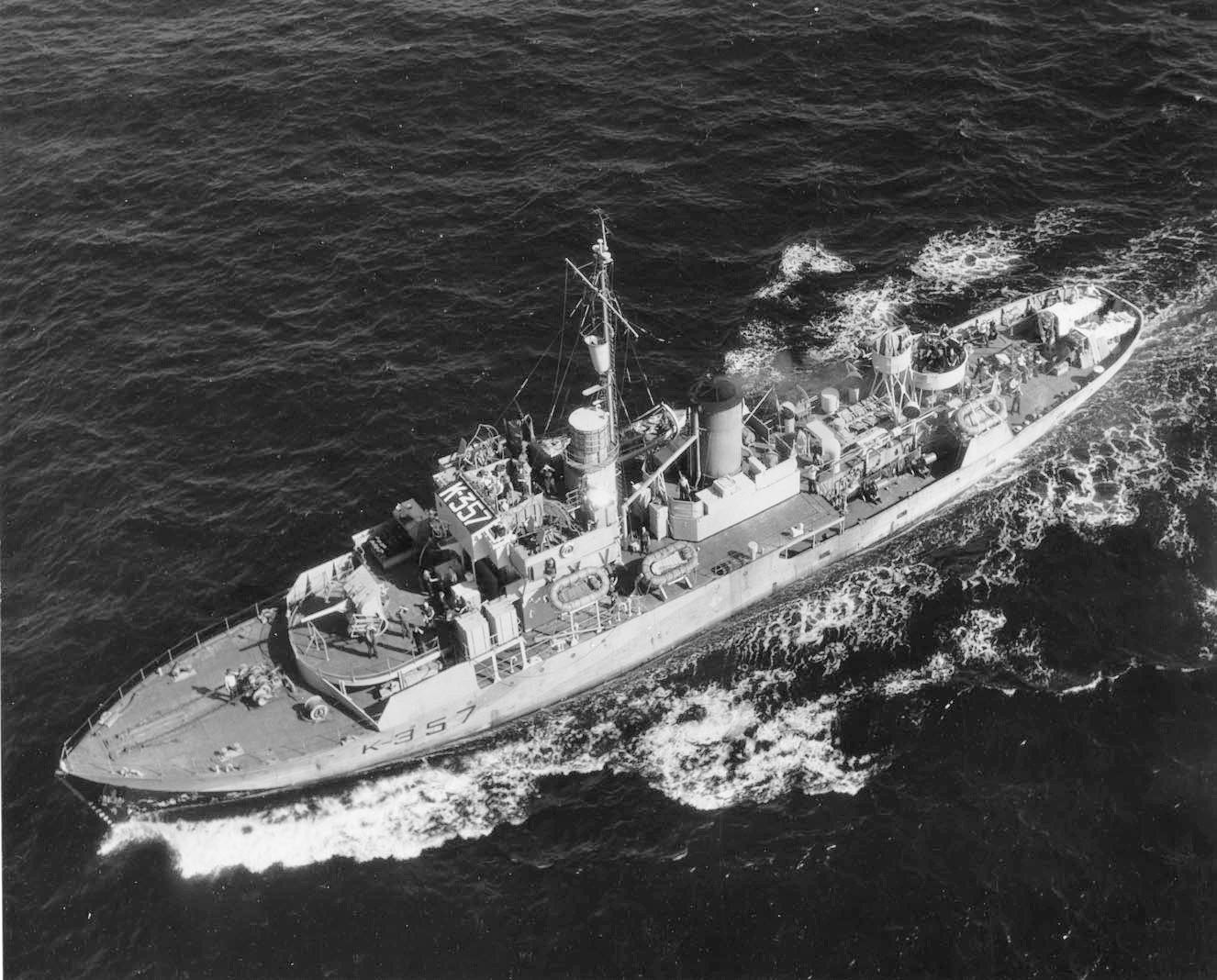
The 294 Flower-class corvettes of the Second World War might be the best known type.

A corvette (Note: Formerly also spelled corvet.) is a small warship. It is traditionally the smallest class of vessel considered to be rated a warship. The warship class above the corvette is that of the frigate, while the class below was historically that of the sloop-of-war.

The modern roles that a corvette fulfills include coastal patrol craft, missile boat and fast attack craft. These corvettes are typically between 500 and 2,000 tons. Recent designs of corvettes may approach 3,000 tons and include a hangar to accommodate a helicopter, having size and capabilities that overlap with smaller frigates. However unlike contemporary frigates, a modern corvette does not have sufficient endurance or seaworthiness for long voyages. The word "corvette" is first found in Middle French, a diminutive of the Dutch word corf, meaning a "basket", from the Latin corbis.

The rank "corvette captain", equivalent in many navies to "lieutenant commander", derives from the name of this type of ship. The rank is the most junior of three "captain" ranks in several European (e.g.; France, Spain, Italy, Germany, Croatia) and South American (e.g., Argentina, Chile, Brazil, Colombia) navies, because a corvette, as the smallest class of rated warship, was traditionally the smallest class of vessel entitled to a commander of a "captain" rank.

== Sailing vessels ==
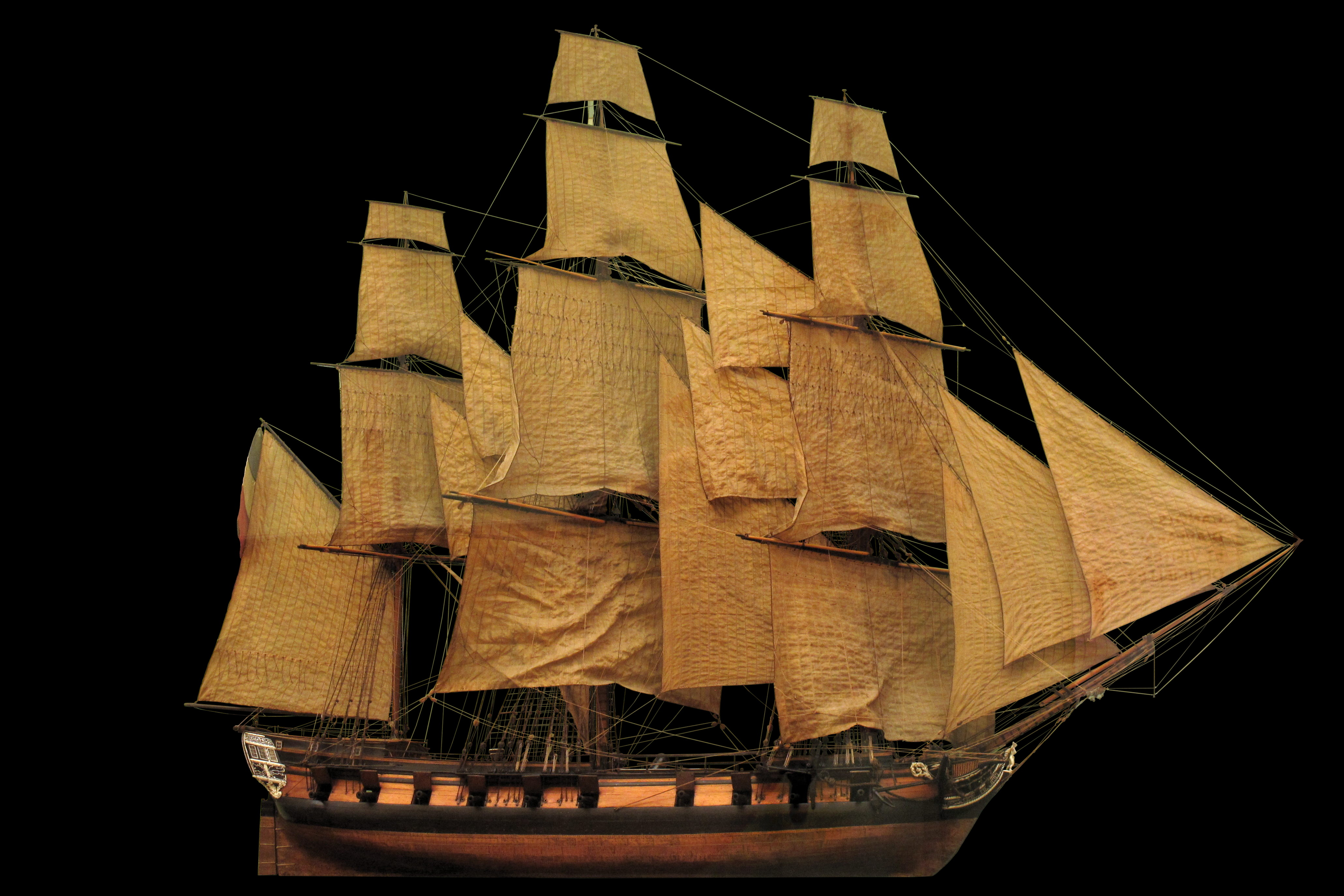
A corvette in the Trianon model collection

During the Age of Sail, corvettes were one of many types of warships smaller than a frigate and with a single deck of guns. They were very closely related to sloops-of-war. The role of the corvette consisted mostly of coastal patrol, fighting minor wars, supporting large fleets, or participating in show-the-flag missions. The Royal Navy began using small ships in the 1650s, but described them as sloops rather than corvettes. The first reference to a corvette was with the French Navy in the 1670s, which may be where the term originated. The French Navy's corvettes grew over the decades and by the 1780s they were ships of 20 guns or so, approximately equivalent to the British navy's post ships. The Royal Navy did not adopt the term until the 1830s, after the Napoleonic Wars had ended, to describe a small sixth-rate vessel somewhat larger than a sloop.

The last vessel lost by France during the American Revolutionary War was the corvette Le Dragon, scuttled by her captain to avoid capture off Monte Cristi Province, Saint-Domingue on January 1783. Most corvettes and sloops of the 17th century were 12 to 18 m (40 to 60 ft) in length and measured 40 to 70 tons burthen. They carried four to eight smaller guns on single decks. Over time, vessels of increasing size and capability were called "corvettes"; by 1800, they reached lengths of over 30 m (100 ft) and measured from 400 to 600 tons burthen.

== Steam ships ==
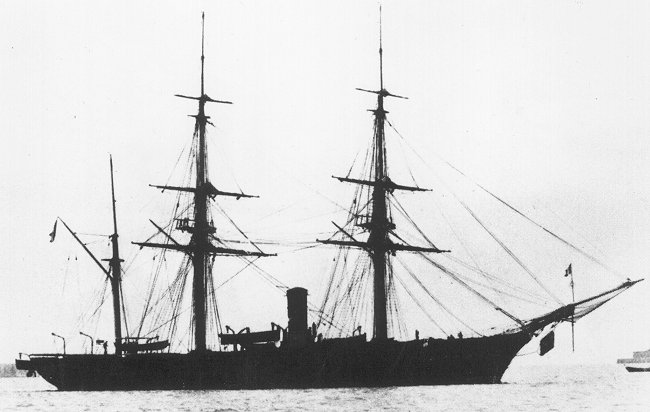
French steam corvette Dupleix (1856–1887)

Ships during the steam era became much faster and more manoeuvrable than their sail ancestors. Corvettes during this era were typically used alongside gunboats during colonial missions. Battleships and other large vessels were unnecessary when fighting the indigenous people of the Far East and Africa.

== World War II ==
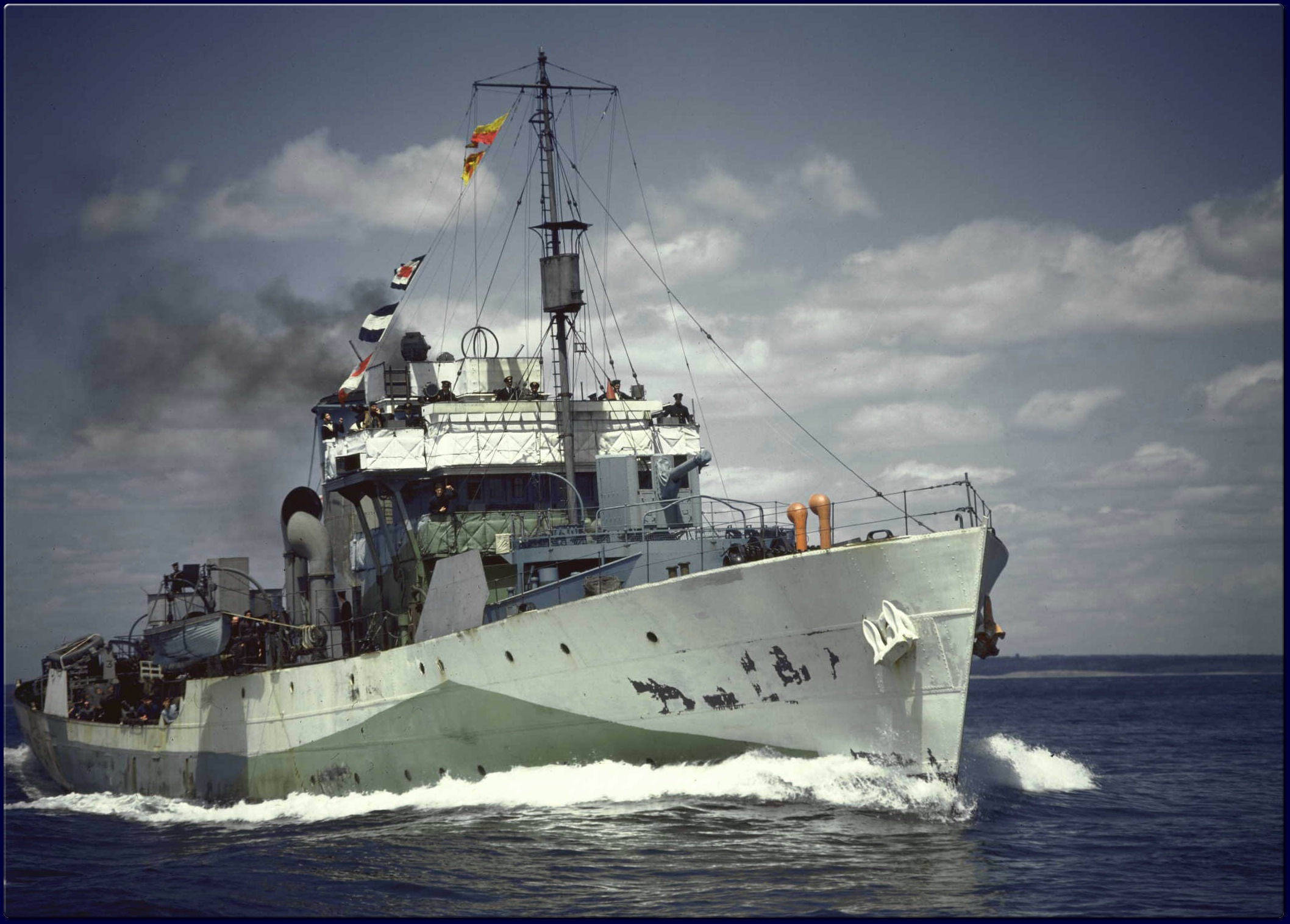
HMCS Regina, a Flower-class corvette

The modern corvette appeared during World War II as an easily-built patrol and convoy escort vessel. The British naval designer William Reed drew up a small ship based on the single-shaft Smiths Dock Company whale catcher Southern Pride, whose simple design and mercantile construction standards lent itself to rapid production in large numbers in small yards unused to naval work. First Lord of the Admiralty Winston Churchill, later Prime Minister, had a hand in reviving the name "corvette".

During the arms buildup leading to World War II, the term "corvette" was almost attached to the Tribal-class destroyer. The Tribals were so much larger than and sufficiently different from other British destroyers that some consideration was given to resurrecting the classification of "corvette" and applying it to them.

This idea was dropped, and the term applied to small, mass-produced antisubmarine escorts such as the Flower class of World War II. (Royal Navy ships were named after flowers, and ships in Royal Canadian Navy service took the name of smaller Canadian cities and towns.) Their chief duty was to protect convoys throughout the Battle of the Atlantic and on the routes from the UK to Murmansk carrying supplies to the Soviet Union. HMCS Sackville is the only remaining member of the class. She is preserved as a museum ship in Halifax, Nova Scotia, Canada.

The Flower-class corvette was originally designed for offshore patrol work, and was not ideal when pressed into service as an antisubmarine escort. It was shorter than ideal for oceangoing convoy escort work, too lightly armed for antiaircraft defence, and the ships were barely faster than the merchantmen they escorted. This was a particular problem given the faster German U-boat designs then emerging. Nonetheless, the ship was quite seaworthy and maneuverable, but living conditions for ocean voyages were challenging. As a result of these shortcomings, the corvette was superseded in the Royal Navy as the escort ship of choice by the frigate, which was larger, faster, better armed, and had two shafts. However, many small yards could not produce vessels of frigate size, so an improved corvette design, the Castle class, was introduced later in the war, with some remaining in service until the mid-1950s.

The Royal Australian Navy built 60 Bathurst-class corvettes, including 20 for the Royal Navy crewed by Australians, and four for the Indian Navy. These were officially described as Australian minesweepers, or as minesweeping sloops by the Royal Navy, and were named after Australian towns.

The Bird-class minesweepers or trawlers were referred to as corvettes in the Royal New Zealand Navy, and two, Kiwi and Moa, rammed and sank a much larger Japanese submarine, I-1, in 1943 in the Solomon Islands.

In Italy, the Regia Marina, in dire need of escort vessels for its convoys, designed the Gabbiano-class corvette, of which 29 were built between 1942 and 1943 (out of 60 planned); they proved apt at operations in the Mediterranean Sea, especially in regards to their anti-air and anti-submarine capability, and were so successful that the class survived after the war into the Marina Militare Italiana until 1972.

== Modern corvettes ==
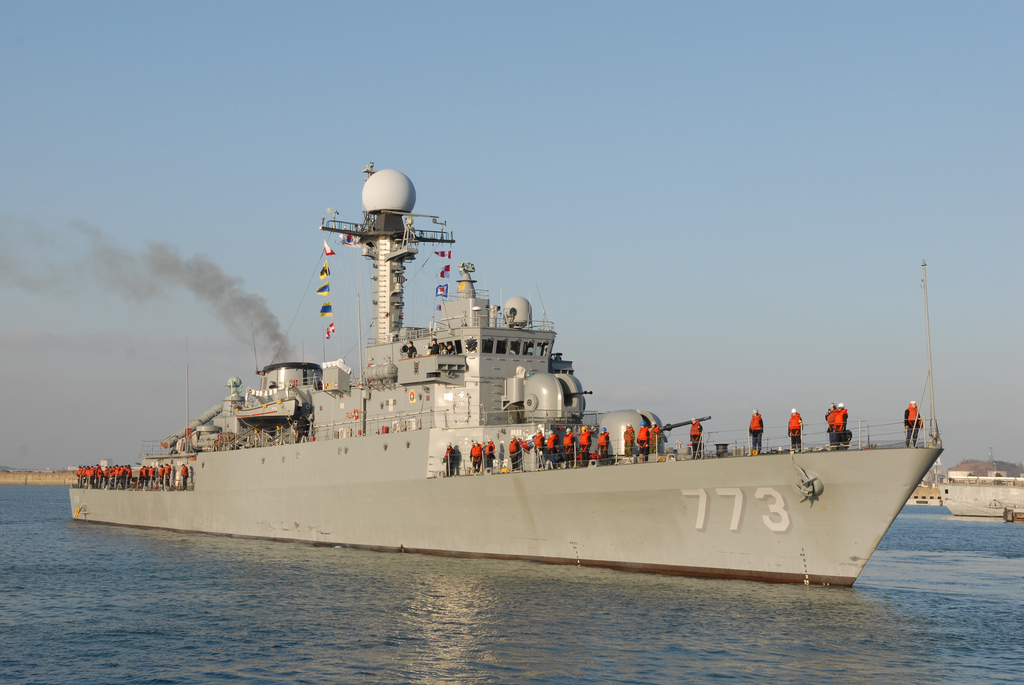
Korean Pohang-class corvette

Modern navies began a trend in the late 20th and early 21st centuries of building corvettes geared towards smaller more manoeuvrable surface capability. These corvettes have displacements between 550 and 3,310 short tons (500 and 3,000 t) and measure 55–128 m (180–420 ft) in length. They are usually armed with medium- and small-calibre guns, surface-to-surface missiles, surface-to-air missiles (SAM), and anti-submarine weapons. Many can accommodate a small or medium anti-submarine warfare helicopter, with the larger ones also having a hangar. While the size and capabilities of the largest corvettes overlap with smaller frigates, corvettes are designed primarily for littoral deployment while frigates are ocean-going vessels by virtue of their greater endurance and seaworthiness.

Most countries with coastlines can build corvette-sized ships, either as part of their commercial shipbuilding activities or in purpose-built yards, but the sensors, weapons, and other systems required for a surface combatant are more specialized and are around 60% of the total cost. These components are purchased on the international market.

=== Current corvette classes ===
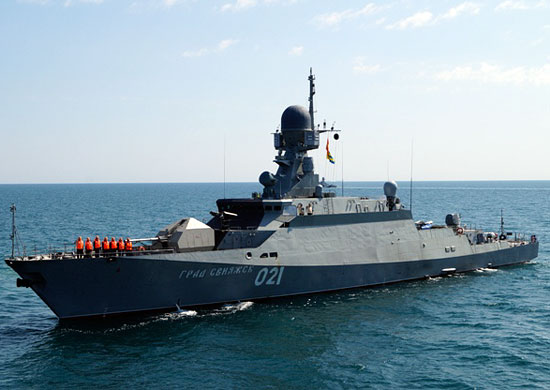
Russian Buyan-M-class corvette

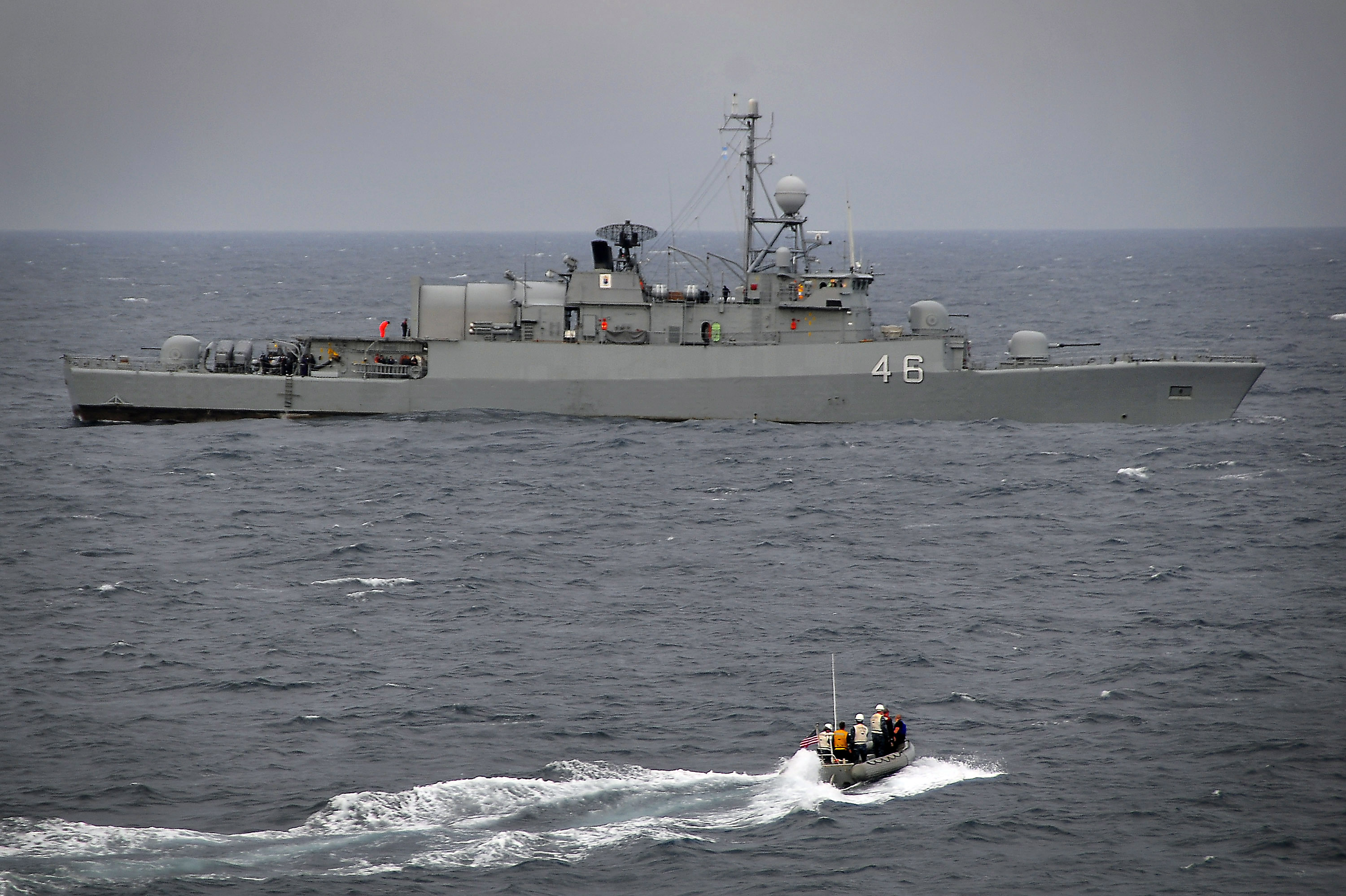
Argentine MEKO Espora-class corvette

Many countries today operate corvettes. Countries that border smaller seas, such as the Baltic Sea or the Persian Gulf, are more likely to build the smaller and more manoeuvrable corvettes, with Russia operating the most corvettes in the world.

In the 1960s, the Portuguese Navy designed the João Coutinho-class corvettes as multi-role small frigates intended to be affordable for a small navy. The João Coutinho class soon inspired a series of similar projects – including the Spanish Descubierta, the German MEKO 140, the French A69 and the Portuguese Baptista de Andrade – adopted by a number of medium- and small-sized navies.

The first operational corvette based on stealth technology was the Royal Norwegian Navy's Skjold class. The Swedish Navy introduced the similarly stealthy Visby class.

Finland has plans to build four multi-role corvettes, currently dubbed the Pohjanmaa class, in the 2020s as part of its navy's Project Squadron 2020. The corvettes will have helicopter carrying, mine laying, ice breaking, anti-aircraft and anti-ship abilities. They will be over 100 metres (330 ft) long and cost a total of 1.2 billion euros.

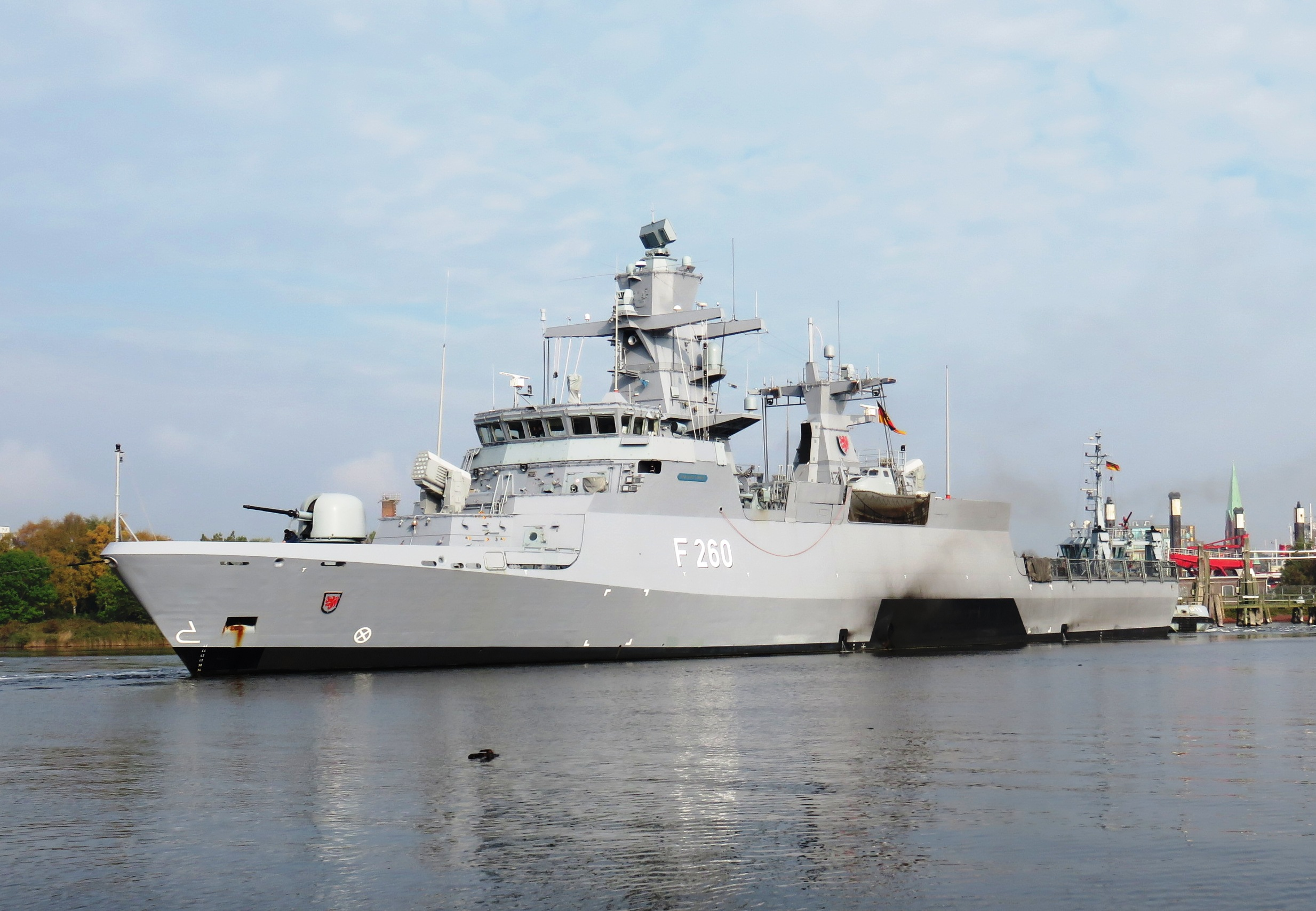
Corvette Braunschweig of the German Navy

The new German Navy Braunschweig class is designed to replace Germany's fast attack craft and also incorporates stealth technology and land attack capabilities. The Israeli Navy has ordered four of these, named Sa'ar 6-class corvettes and a more heavily armed version of the type, deliveries commenced in 2019.

The Greek Navy has categorised the class as fast attack missile craft. A similar vessel is the Kılıç-class fast attack missile craft of the Turkish Navy, which is classified as a corvette by Lürssen Werft, the German ship designer.

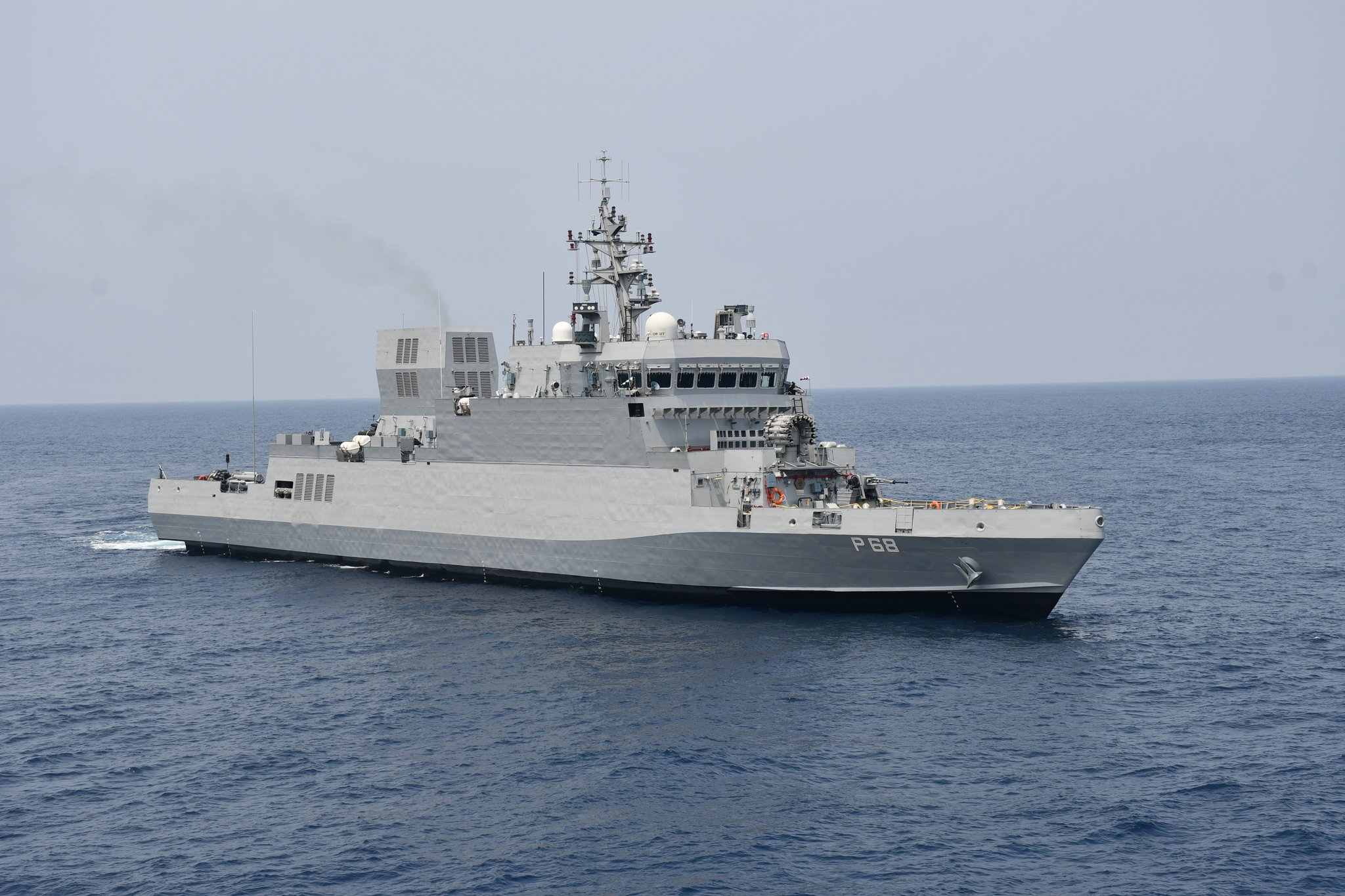
Dedicated Anti-Submarine Warfare Shallow Water Craft of the Indian Navy

The Indian Navy operates four Kamorta-class corvettes built by Garden Reach Shipbuilders and Engineers. All of them were in service by 2017. Also Anti-Submarine Warfare Shallow Water Craft corvettes are getting inducted into service.

The Israeli Navy operates three Sa'ar 5-class corvettes and four Sa'ar 6-class corvettes. The Sa'ar 5's were built in the U.S. to an Israeli design, they each carry one helicopter and are well-armed with offensive and defensive weapons systems, including the Barak 8 SAM, and advanced electronic sensors and countermeasures. They displace over 1,200 tons at full load. The Sa'ar 6's were built in Germany to an Israeli design. They are equipped with a 76 mm main gun, anti-ship missiles, torpedoes, and defence systems like the "Naval Dome" for missile interception, making them exceptionally well-armed for their size of 1,900 tons.

Turkey began to build MİLGEM-class corvettes in 2005. The MİLGEM class is designed for anti-submarine warfare and littoral patrol duty. The lead ship, TCG Heybeliada, entered navy service in 2011. The design concept and mission profile of the MİLGEM class is similar to the Freedom class of littoral combat ships of the United States.

In 2004, to replace the Ardhana-class patrol boat, the United Arab Emirates Ministry of Defence awarded a contract to Abu Dhabi Ship Building for the Baynunah class of corvettes. This class is based on the CMN Group's Combattante BR70 design. The Baynunah class is designed for patrol and surveillance, minelaying, interception and other anti-surface warfare operations in the United Arab Emirates territorial waters and exclusive economic zone.

The United States is developing littoral combat ships, which are essentially large corvettes, their spacious hulls permitting space for mission modules, allowing them to undertake tasks formerly assigned to specialist classes such as minesweepers or the anti-submarine Oliver Hazard Perry-class frigate.

== Current operators ==
- Albanian Naval Force operates a single Cassiopea-class corvette
- Algerian National Navy operates three Adhafer-class and four Djebel Chenoua-class corvettes
- Argentine Navy operates six Espora-class corvettes
- Royal Bahraini Naval Force operates two Al-Manama-class corvettes
- Bangladesh Navy operates two modified Castle-class patrol vessels purchased from the United Kingdom, which were upgraded to guided-missile corvettes and four Type 056 Shadhinota-class corvettes.
- Bangladesh Coast Guard operates four Minerva-class corvettes purchased from Italy
- Brazilian Navy operates one Imperial Marinheiro-class and two Inhaúma-class corvettes
- Republic of China Navy operates six Ching Chiang-class and seven Tuo Chiang-class corvettes
- Colombian National Navy operates a single Donghae-class corvette purchased from South Korea
- Ecuadorian Navy operates six Esmeraldas-class corvettes
- Egyptian Navy operates four Gowind-class corvettes
- Navy of Equatorial Guinea operates a single Bata-class corvette
- French Navy operates five D'Estienne d'Orves-class avisos
- Indian Navy operates three Anti-Submarine Warfare Shallow Water Craft, plus seven Veer-class, two Khukri-class, four Kora-class, and four Kamorta-class corvettes
- Indonesian Navy operates fourteen Parchim-class corvettes purchased from East Germany, three Fatahillah-class and four Diponegoro-class corvettes purchased from the Netherlands, three Bung Tomo-class corvettes purchased from the UK, and two Bung Karno-class corvettes built locally, with KRI Bung Karno (369) being a presidential corvette.
- Israeli Navy operates three Sa'ar 5-class and four Sa'ar 6-class corvettes
- Iraqi Navy operates two Assad-class corvettes
- Korean People's Navy operates two Amnok-class, four Sariwon-class, and two Nampo-class corvettes; plus a single Fugas-class minesweeper/corvette
- Royal Malaysian Navy operates six Kedah-class, two Kasturi-class, and four Laksamana-class corvettes
- Mexican Navy operates four Sierra-class corvettes
- Royal Norwegian Navy operates six Skjold-class corvettes
- Royal Navy of Oman operates three Khareef-class, and two Qahir-class corvettes
- Pakistan Navy operates four Yarmook-class, and four Babur-class corvettes
- Peruvian Navy operates six PR-72P-class corvettes
- Philippine Navy operates three Jacinto-class corvettes purchased from the United Kingdom, and one Pohang-class corvette
- Polish Navy operates one Kaszub-class, and one Gawron-class corvette
- Qatari Emiri Navy operates four Doha-class corvettes
- Romanian Naval Forces operate two Admiral Petre Bărbuneanu-class, and two Rear-Admiral Eustațiu Sebastian-class corvettes
- Russian Navy [as of 2025] operates sixteen Grisha-class, six Parchim-class, five to seven Nanuchka-class, sixteen Tarantul-class, three Buyan-class, twelve Buyan-M-class, six Karakurt-class, and two Bora-class; plus one Gremyashchiy-class, and nine Steregushchiy-class corvettes [both classified by NATO as frigates]
- Russian Coast Guard operates two Pauk-class corvettes
- Royal Saudi Navy operates five Al Jubail-class, and four Badr-class corvettes
- Republic of Singapore Navy operates six Victory-class corvettes
- Swedish Navy operates five Visby-class, and two Stockholm-class corvettes
- Royal Thai Navy operates one Ratanakosin-class, one Tapi-class, and three Khamronsin-class corvettes
- Turkish Naval Forces operates four Ada-class corvettes
- Turkmen Naval Forces operates a single Turkmen-class corvette
- Ukrainian Sea Guard operates a single Pauk-class corvette
- United Arab Emirates Navy operates one Abu Dhabi-class, two Muray-Jib-class, and six Baynunah-class corvettes

=== Tarantul-class corvette ===
- Russian Navy operates sixteen Tarantul-class, and two Tarantul-IV-class [as of 2025]
- Foreign Operators:
  - Bulgarian Navy operates one Tarantul-class, and two Pauk-class
  - Cuban Revolutionary Navy operates one Pauk-class
  - Romanian Naval Forces operate three Tarantul-class
  - Indian Navy operates seven Veer-class, and one Abhay-class
  - Turkmen Naval Forces operates two Molniya-class
  - Vietnam People's Navy operates eight Molniya-class, and four Tarantul-I-class
  - Yemeni Navy possesses one Tarantul-I-class, currently out of operation

=== Pohang-class corvette ===
- Republic of Korea Navy operates two Batch VI; plus four Batch V, and four Batch IV as reserve & training ships
- Foreign Operators:
  - Colombian National Navy operates one Batch IV
  - Egyptian Navy operates one Batch III
  - Peruvian Navy operates one Batch II, and one Batch IV
  - Philippine Navy operates one Batch III, and one Batch IV
  - Vietnam People's Navy operates two Batch III, and one Batch IV

=== Descubierta-class corvette ===
- Foreign Operators:
  - Egyptian Navy operates two ships
  - Royal Moroccan Navy operates one ship

=== Jiangdao-class corvette (Type 056) ===
- China Coast Guard operates twenty-two ships
- People's Liberation Army Navy operates forty-nine ships
- Foreign Operators:
  - Algerian National Navy operates one ship
  - Bangladesh Navy operates four ships
  - Nigerian Navy operates two ships

=== Braunschweig-class corvette ===
- German Navy operates eight ships
- Foreign Operators:
  - Israeli Navy operates four Sa'ar 6-class

=== Khukri-class corvette ===
- Indian Navy operates two ships
- Foreign Operators:
  - Vietnam People's Navy operates one ship

=== Nanuchka-class corvette ===
- Russian Navy operates five to seven ships [as of 2025]
- Foreign Operators:
  - Algerian National Navy operates three ships

== Former operators ==
- Royal Australian Navy decommissioned its last Bathurst-class corvette in 1960.
- Belgian Navy returned both its Flower-class corvettes to the United Kingdom in 1944.
- Royal Canadian Navy decommissioned all its Flower-class corvettes and Castle-class corvettes in 1945, following World War II.
- Chilean Navy decommissioned its last Flower-class corvette in 1967.
- Royal Danish Navy decommissioned its last Niels Juel-class corvette in 2009.
- Dominican Navy decommissioned its last Flower-class corvette in 1979.
- Finnish Navy decommissioned its last Turunmaa-class corvette in 2002.
- Volksmarine sold all of its 16 Parchim-class corvettes to Indonesia in 1992.
- Border Police of Georgia decommissioned its two Grisha-class corvettes in 1995.
- Hellenic Navy decommissioned its last Flower-class corvette in 1952.
- Islamic Republic of Iran Navy lost its fleet of one Hamzeh-class and two Bayandor-class corvettes to combat action in the 2026 Iran War
- Islamic Revolutionary Guard Corps Navy lost its fleet of one Abu Mahdi al Muhandis-class and three Shahid Soleimani-class corvettes to combat action in the 2026 Iran War
- Irish Naval Service decommissioned its two Peacock-class corvettes in 2022.
- Italian Navy decommissioned its last Minerva-class corvette in 2019.
- Lithuanian Naval Force decommissioned both its Grisha-class corvettes in 2009.
- Namibian Navy decommissioned its lone Imperial Marinheiro-class corvette in 2012.
- Royal Netherlands Navy decommissioned its last Bathurst-class corvette in 1958.
- Royal New Zealand Navy decommissioned both its Flower-class corvettes in 1948.
- Portuguese Navy decommissioned its last Baptista de Andrade-class corvette in 2026.
- South African Navy decommissioned its lone Flower-class corvette in 1967.
- Spanish Navy decommissioned its last Descubierta-class corvette in 2024.
- Royal Navy decommissioned its last Peacock-class corvette in 1996.
- Ukrainian Navy last Grisha-class corvette Vinnytsia was sunk in Ochakiv in 2022.
- United States Navy decommissioned all its Flower-class corvettes in 1945 following World War II.
- National Navy of Uruguay decommissioned its lone Castle-class corvette in 1975.
- Bolivarian Navy of Venezuela decommissioned its last Flower-class corvette in 1962.
- Yugoslav Navy returned its lone Flower-class corvette to the United Kingdom in 1949.

== Future development ==
- Algerian National Navy will receive three Steregushchiy-class corvettes from Russia and six Jiangdao-class corvettes from China.
- Angolan Navy will receive three Baynunah-class corvettes from the United Arab Emirates.
- Royal Canadian Navy is planning to build its Continental Defense Corvette
- Republic of China Navy is planning to build 11 more Tuo Chiang-class corvettes.
- Egyptian Navy is will commission three more Gowind-class corvettes.
- Finnish Navy is currently planning to build four Pohjanmaa-class corvettes.
- French Navy is a partner nation in the European Patrol Corvette project.
- German Navy is building an additional five Braunschweig-class corvettes.
- Hellenic Navy is a partner nation in the European Patrol Corvette project. Greece is also planning on receiving a number of Themistocles-class corvettes, a variant of the Israeli Sa'ar 72 class. Greece has also ordered three Gowind 2500-class corvettes from France.
- Indian Navy has begun research into its NGC (Next-Gen Corvette) project. India is also building 16 Anti-Submarine Warfare Shallow Water Craft (ASW-SWC) corvette, and has signed contracts to build a further 6 corvettes under Next Generation Missile Vessels project.
- Indonesian Navy has approved the procurement proposal of up to three Pohang-class corvettes from South Korea.
- Israeli Navy is building five new Reshef-class corvettes.
- Italian Navy is leading the development of the European Patrol Corvette in a joint project with other European Union partners.
- Pakistan Navy has ordered four Ada-class corvettes from Turkey.
- Philippine Navy purchased an additional Pohang-class corvette from South Korea, but is awaiting transfer due to lack of funding. The Philippines have also ordered two new corvettes from Hyundai.
- Romanian Naval Forces is a partner nation in the European Patrol Corvette project.
- Spanish Navy is a partner nation in the European Patrol Corvette project.
- Swedish Navy has ordered four Luleå-class vessels.
- Russian Navy is building (as of 2025) corvettes in six separate classes, including: an updated Tarantul IV version of the Tarantul-class, the Karakurt class, Bykov class, Steregushchiy class, Gremyashchiy class and Derzky class (the latter three classed as frigates by NATO).
- Ukrainian Navy has ordered an unspecified number of Ada-class corvettes from Turkey.
- United Arab Emirates Navy has ordered two Gowind-class corvettes.

== Museum ships ==
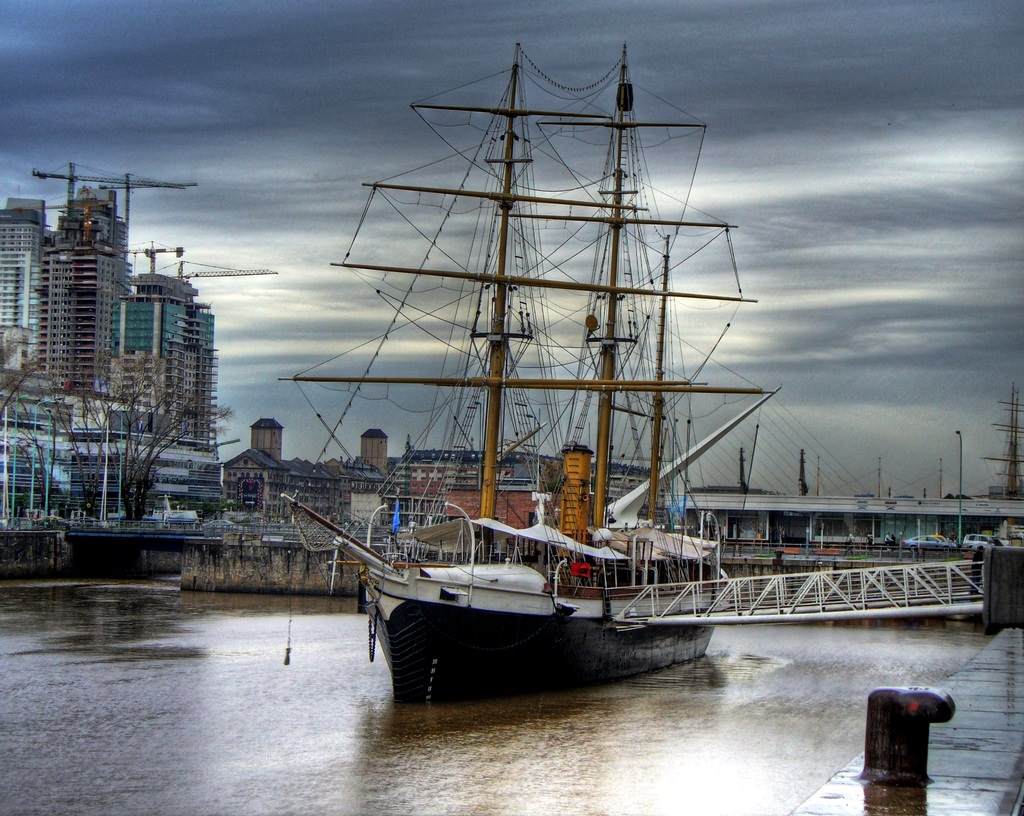
ARA Uruguay, an Argentine corvette from 1874, has been a museum ship in Buenos Aires since 1967.

- Chilean corvette Esmeralda 1854, (Replica from 2011), in Iquique, Chile.
- ARA Uruguay, 1874 steam and sail barque, Buenos Aires, Argentina.
- HTMS Maeklong (1937) in Samut Prakan Province, Thailand.
- HMAS Castlemaine, 1941 Bathurst-class corvette, Williamstown, Victoria, Australia.
- HMCS Sackville, 1941 Flower-class corvette, Halifax, Nova Scotia, Canada.
- HMAS Whyalla, 1941 Bathurst-class corvette, Whyalla, South Australia.
- Solimões, 1955 Imperial Marinheiro-class corvette, Belém, Para, Brazil.
- Karjala, 1968 Turunmaa-class corvette, Turku, Finland.
- ROKS Pohang, 1984 Pohang-class corvette in Pohang, South Korea.
- Hans Beimler, 1986 Tarantul-class corvette in Peenemünde, Germany.
- Tamboviskiy Komsomolets, 1987 Tarantul-class corvette in Kronstadt, Russia.
- Cheboksary, 1987 Pauk-class corvette in Cheboksary, Russia.
- ROKS Jinhae, 1988 Pohang-class corvette in Jinhae, South Korea.
- ROKS Cheonan, 1988 Pohang-class corvette, was sunk by a North Korean submarine on March 26, 2010, and later raised, is on display in Pyeongtaek, South Korea.
- INS Khukri (P49), 1989 Khukri-class missile corvette in Diu, India.
- INS Nishank (K43), 1989 Tarantul-class missile corvette at the National Maritime Heritage Complex, Lothal, India.

=== Former museum ships ===
- Imperial Marinheiro, 1955 Imperial Marinheiro-class corvette, Porto Velho, Brazil - Scrapped in 2023, after partially sinking at her moorings.
- Hiddensee, 1984 Tarantul-class missile corvette, Fall River, Massachusetts, US - Scrapped in 2023 due to severe hull deterioration.

== See also ==
- List of corvette classes
- List of corvette and sloop classes of the Royal Navy
- List of corvettes of the Second World War
- List of Escorteurs of the French Navy
- Corvette 31, a sailboat named in honour of the warship class.
