= Second Battle of Latakia =

1973 naval battle of the Yom Kippur War

- Part of Yom Kippur War
| Date | 11 October 1973 |
| Location | Latakia, Syria |
| Result | Syrian victory |

Belligerents
| Israel | (Ba'athist Syria) Syria |

Commanders and leaders
| (Israel) Michael Barkai | (Ba'athist Syria) Unknown |

Units involved
| Sa'ar 2-class, Sa'ar 3-class, and Sa'ar 4-class missile boats armed with Gabriel anti-ship missiles | Komar- and Osa-class missile boats armed with P-15 Termit (SS-N-2 Styx) anti-ship missiles |

The Second Battle of Latakia was a small naval battle of the Yom Kippur War fought on 11 October 1973 between Israel and Syria. The Israeli Navy force consisted of Sa'ar 2-class, Sa'ar 3-class, and Sa'ar 4-class missile boats armed with Gabriel anti-ship missiles while the Syrian Navy force consisted of Soviet-made Komar- and Osa-class missile boats armed with Soviet-manufactured P-15 Termit (NATO reporting name SS-N-2 Styx) anti-ship missiles.

== Prelude ==
After losing three missile boats during the first Battle of Latakia on 7 October 1973, the Syrian Navy refused to engage the Israeli Navy in open battle at sea. Instead, it used its missile boats on short forays from harbor mouths to launch missiles, relying on coastal artillery batteries for defense. To provoke the Syrian missile boats into open combat, the commander of the Israeli Navy missile-boat flotilla, Michael Barkai, was dispatched with seven missile boats to launch a night attack on Syrian ports. Oil tanks at the ports were marked as secondary targets.

Barkai split his force, assigning two Sa'ar 4-class missile boats to attack the Port of Banias and another two boats to attack the Syrian naval base at Mina Al-Baida. He assigned the other three missile boats, the Sa'ar 3-class boats INS Hetz and INS Herev and the Sa'ar 2-class boat INS Haifa, to attack Latakia again.

== Battle ==
As the boats began their attack, Barkai ordered them to turn their electronic countermeasures (ECM) on and at the same time proceed to their targets at 40 knots. As they had been during the earlier battle, Syrian radar operators were confused, believing they were tracking five groups of targets with a combined 17 ships between 12 and 15 nautical miles off the coast. The Syrian Navy dispatched two missile boats from Banias and two from Latakia to fire their missiles at the targets.

Upon reaching Latakia, the Israelis found that the Syrian missile boats were using foreign merchant ships anchored off the harbor for protection, darting in and out from among the ships to fire their missiles. The Israeli boats were ordered to fire on the Syrian boats despite the risk of hitting the unarmed merchant ship. As a result, Israeli Gabriel missiles sank two of the merchant ships, one Japanese and one Greek.

INS Hetz sighted one Styx missile missing her overhead, and a gunner on Hetz shot down another Styx. The battle lasted for almost two hours, with the Israeli boats zigzagging around the port trying to evade fire from the Syrian missile boats and coastal artillery, while at the same time alternately shooting at either the Syrian missile boats or at the oil tanks on shore.

The Israelis ultimately failed to ignite any of the oil tanks and could only account for probable hits on one Osa-class and one Komar-class boat. Only the attack on the Port of Banias was successful in igniting the oil tanks on shore.
