= Cherbourg Project =

Escape of Israeli of fast attack craft from France

- The route of the boats from Cherbourg to Israel
- Location: CMN Shipyard, Cherbourg, France
- Planned by: Rear Admiral Mordechai Limon
- Objective: Extract five embargoed Sa'ar 3-class missile boats and sail them to Haifa, Israel
- Date: 24 December 1969
- Executed by: Israeli Navy; Israeli Air Force
- Outcome: Successful extraction

The Cherbourg Project (or Boats of Cherbourg) was an Israeli military operation that took place on 24 December 1969 and involved the escape of five remaining armed Sa'ar 3 class boats from the French port of Cherbourg (Cherbourg-Octeville since 2000, Cherbourg-en-Cotentin since 2016). The boats had been paid for by the Israeli government but had not been delivered due to the French arms embargo in 1969. The operation was planned by the Israeli Navy, and was codenamed Operation Noa, after the daughter of Captain Binyamin "Bini" Telem.

== Background ==
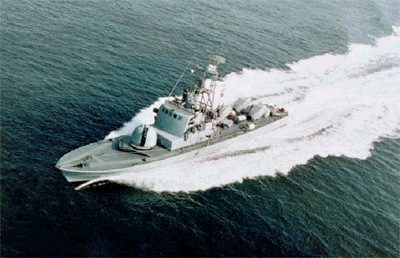
A Sa'ar 3 boat

The Israeli naval command had reached the conclusion by the early 1960s that their old Second World War-era destroyers, frigates and corvettes were obsolete and new ships and vessels were needed. A survey was undertaken and the West German shipyard of Lürssen was recommended. The shipyard was asked to design a new generation of small missile boat platforms and to modify the suggested wooden Jaguar-class torpedo boats according to Israeli Navy requirements.

Due to Arab League pressure on the West German government, this plan was not continued and a new builder was sought. The Israeli Navy survey recommended that the Cherbourg-based CMN shipyard owned by Félix Amiot would build the boats, based upon the Israeli requirements. The boats were constructed by the French and the MTU engines were German-designed. The project received the codename "Autumn".

Crews were sent to France in early 1965. The technical team was headed by Commander Haim Schachal. The administrative and operational side was headed by then-Captain Binyamin (Bini) Telem, who later became the Israeli Navy's commander in chief during the Yom Kippur War.

The deal was entered into during the "Golden Age" of Franco-Israeli relations. Prior to the Six-Day War in 1967, France had been Israel's closest ally. In the wake of Israel's victory, relations began to worsen. In 1968, Israeli paratroopers commanded by then-Colonel Raphael Eitan (who later became IDF chief of staff), carried out a raid on Beirut airport during operations against the Palestine Liberation Organization (PLO). In response, French President Charles de Gaulle ordered a full arms embargo on Israel.

The problem of the Cherbourg boats was left aside. President de Gaulle was irritated by what he considered an Israeli lack of respect for Franco-Israeli agreements and he was eager to reinforce France's relations with the Arab world. The resignation of de Gaulle and the election of Georges Pompidou to be the president of France inspired hope among the Israelis. The Israeli government assumed that Pompidou would lift the embargo, but were proved wrong.

While the embargo was ordered, construction of the boats continued according to the original plan; and while the Israeli naval mission was in Cherbourg, controlling the project, Israeli crews were aboard the completed boats and the whole project was fully paid for by Israel.

The build-up of the Egyptian Navy with Soviet assistance during the 1960s and their procurement of new missile boats such as the Osa and Komar classes had, by the early days of the War of Attrition, changed the balance of power in the Mediterranean theatre in favour of Arab navies and away from the Israeli Navy. There was by now an urgent need for a new generation of vessels for the Israeli Navy. Israel had been developing seaborne surface-to-surface missiles, but the new vessels they would be launched from were now being built at Cherbourg. Their delivery was considered a high priority by the Israeli Navy.

The loss of the destroyer INS Eilat during an attack by Komar-class missile boats in October 1967 and the accidental loss of the submarine INS Dakar in 1968, as well as the general aging of the Israeli fleet, brought naval planners to the conclusion that the boats had to be taken from France by deception.

== The operation ==
=== Preparations ===
The plan to take the boats was formulated by retired Rear Admiral Mordechai "Mokka" Limon, formerly the Israeli Navy's commander in chief, who was the head of the Israel Defense Forces mission in Paris. Limon's affiliation with the Rothschild family provided him with important connections in France with the French government, and more widely in Europe as well.

During that period, several events worked in favor of the Israelis. In 1967, the first of the twelve boats ordered, INS Mivtach (Reliance), was completed and launched. A telecom from Israeli Navy command informed the Israelis in Cherbourg that the embargo was expected to escalate, and the boats would have to sail immediately to Haifa during sea trials, ignoring the French protocols for leaving port. This angered the French, and they ordered the Israeli Navy and the other boats to leave the French harbour, and dock instead at the commercial port, which was unguarded.

The boats were transferred to a front company called Starboat, registered in Panama, allegedly a Norwegian oil drill company. The front company was Limon's idea, aided by his connections with Mila Brenner (1921–1999), a retired naval officer with a rank of commander and the co-owner of the Israel-based Maritime Fruit Carriers Company, a company that operated cargo ships transporting fruit. Mila Brenner knew the Norwegian businessman Martin Siem, who was able to provide assistance.

The front company feigned interest in the boats as potential survey ships for searching for oil, and declared that the boats' specifications met their needs. To add to the deception Limon pretended to have "tough negotiations" with Starboat. The terms agreed were that the boats would be transferred to Starboat and would be crewed by members of the Israeli Navy due to their experience with the boats. The boats were sold and transferred legally by the government of Israel to the front company with the approval of Michel Debré, the French Defense Minister.

The next stage of the operation was to build a day-to-day routine with the aim of ultimately misleading the French at Cherbourg. Israeli skeleton crews took over the boats and maintained a routine of short voyages, heading north into the Atlantic. The skeleton crews were secretly reinforced by 80 Israeli officers, ratings and sailors in civilian clothes who arrived in groups of two at different destinations throughout Europe as tourists, and then travelled to Cherbourg. It was feared that sending them all to Cherbourg at once would alert French intelligence. They were ordered to keep moving between hotels, and not to stay in any one hotel for more than one night. The crews travelled on Israeli passports so that in the event they were caught, they could not be charged with passport fraud. By 23 December, all crews had arrived, and were scattered around the city. Mossad director-general Meir Amit considered the risk to the operation to be very high, recalling "it just needed one suspicious French policeman to ask why so many Jews were coming to Cherbourg for Christmas and the whole operation could be blown."

Prior to the escape, the boats had to be fuelled with a large amount of diesel and stocked with enough food to sustain an eight-day voyage. Stocking and fuelling this amount all at once could have alerted observers to the fact that a long voyage was planned. Commander Rinat, the head of operations, instead ordered the boats to be gradually fuelled using a small 5-ton tank truck. A quarter of a million litres of fuel was smuggled in drums and hidden belowdecks. By 24 December, the boats had been fully fuelled and stored. The supply officer bought fresh and dry food from local grocery stores to stock on the boats. To prevent arousing suspicion, the supplies were purchased in small quantities each time.

Since sudden engine noise during the night of the escape would alert the French, the operation's commander, Captain Hadar Kimhi, ordered the boats' engines to be regularly started at nights, causing the inhabitants of Cherbourg to become accustomed to the noise. The local police visited the boats in response to inhabitants' complaints, and received the explanations that the electrical supply from the shore was not enough to warm the boats during the cold days of December. The boats received an authorization from the electrical company and police to operate their engines at night. The noise was loud with twenty Maybach main engines running.

Meanwhile, the ZIM navigation company Europe Lines were approached to help in providing fuel, once the boats had left Cherbourg. Assistance was provided by Edmond Wilhelm Brillant, a retired navy officer and a naval architect. He designated MV Lea to provide fuel at Gibraltar and MV Nahariya as a backup in the Bay of Biscay, both general cargo ships that were available. The main difficulty at this stage of the plan was the conversion of MV Lea into a fuelling ship carrying 200,000 litres of light diesel fuel. This was solved by conversion of the ballast tank in the ship's bow and bottom into a fuel tank.

The pump system was converted to operate as both a fire fighting and fuelling pump. Special high pressure hoses were used. A fuelling drill was developed prior sailing to the rendezvous point near Gibraltar. According to international maritime regulations, MV Lea could not sail since safety regulations banned ships from carrying fuel in the bow as fuel vapour may cause an explosion. This issue was solved by Brillant with the aid of Kirstine shipyards and a Lloyd's Register surveyor.

A special filter was needed to make sure no dirt from tanks would contaminate the boat's tanks and engines. This filter was improvised by Brillant. It was capable of fuelling five boats, but only two at a time were fuelled at the ship's stern. The overall conversion and drill took twelve hours. Other Zim divisions provided the Dan, a Ro-Ro ship sister of MV Nili, which would provide fuel near Lampedusa. The captain of MV Dan was Yosef Dror, a retired navy commander and Shayetet 13 commando frogman. In this case, tanker trailers were loaded in the ship's garage. These Zim ships sailed with additional crew made up of members of the Israeli Navy.

=== Escape ===
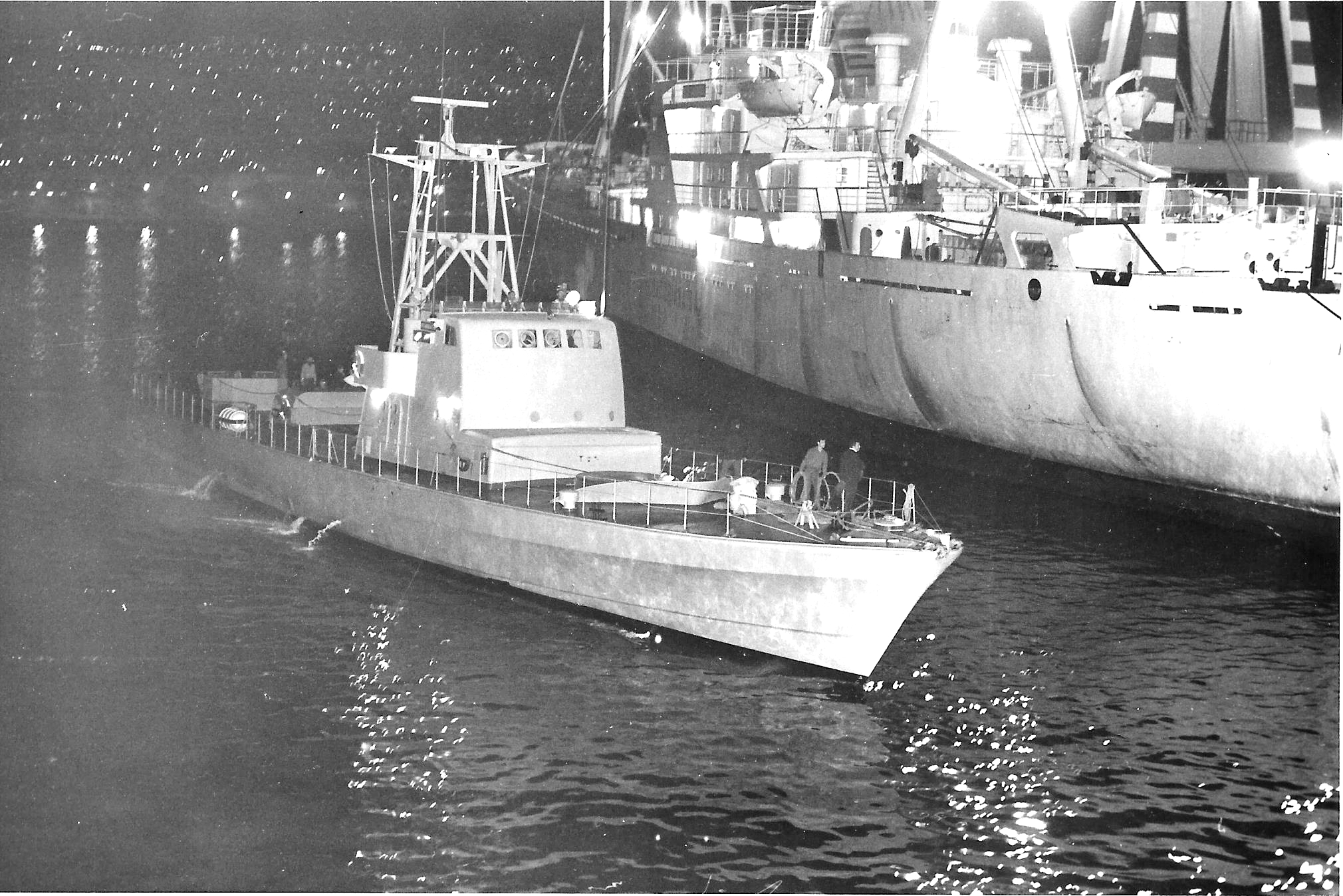
One of the boats arriving in Haifa

The boats were to escape on Christmas Eve. On the eve of the escape, the skeleton crews continued to maintain the boats, while the 80 crews who came to reinforce them hid belowdecks. The Israelis feared that the boats could sink while sailing through the Bay of Biscay in severe winter conditions. The group had a meteorologist assigned to them, who monitored all British, French and Spanish weather forecasts. Despite a forecast predicting rain from the south-west, the crews were ordered to sail out at 20:30. By 19:30, all crews were aboard.

There was a force 9 storm on the night of the escape, and after the weather worsened, the departure time was extended to 22:30, but the escape was again delayed by worsening weather. Captain Hadar Kimhi received urgent coded messages from Israel ordering him to set sail despite the weather, but he decided to wait. At midnight, the meteorologist picked up a BBC report indicating that the storm would die down in two hours. At 02:30, the boats left Cherbourg and headed slowly out to sea.

The French were initially unaware that the Israeli boats had left port, and their absence was noticed by a reporter who visited the port and saw that all the boats were missing. He immediately reported it to the BBC almost 12 hours after the escape, and so the French authorities learned of the boats' disappearance from the BBC. The empty berths and an absence of any announcement of the embargo's termination caused speculation that Israel had taken the boats. A television news team flew out over the North Sea to see if the boats were heading towards Norway, to where they had ostensibly been sold, while other news crews headed out over the Mediterranean.

The boats crossed the Bay of Biscay before turning south and crossing into the Mediterranean, meeting Israeli support ships along the way. During fuelling by MV Lea at Gibraltar, one of the Israeli Navy crew members mistakenly allowed water into the fuel tanks of INS Hetz (Arrow). It was not initially known whether the water was seawater; if it was, it could not be drained and might damage the engines. Commander Rinat asked the crew to taste the fuel and to indicate if it was salty or not. Having determined that it was not seawater, the tanks were drained.

As the boats passed Gibraltar into the Mediterranean, the British monitoring station flashed a signal, asking the boats to identify themselves. The boats gave no reply, and a Lloyd's helicopter circling over them detected no flags or identity numbers. The British personnel, who had heard the media reports of the disappearance of the Israeli boats from Cherbourg, correctly guessed the boat's nationalities and true destination, then flashed the signal "bon voyage". The Israelis took it as a signal that the British understood who they were. The boats were spotted by television crews in the Mediterranean as they travelled fast towards Israel, hugging the coast of North Africa. Near Crete, Israeli Air Force F-4 Phantom fighters met up with the boats and flew low overhead in escort.

French Defence Minister Michel Debré ordered an air strike to sink the boats. The French Chief of Staff refused to obey and replied he would resign rather than obey the order. The order was countermanded by Prime Minister Jacques Chaban-Delmas, who prevented any further escalation. Although the French government was furious, it realized that there was little that could be done, since the boats were already on the high seas when the ruse was uncovered. French Foreign Minister Maurice Schumann warned that if the boats appeared in Israel, "the consequences will be very grave indeed".

The Israeli boats sailed a total of 3,145 nmi (5,825 km; 3,619 mi), beginning in the English Channel, and arriving at the Kishon Shipyard port in Haifa bay on 31 December. The boats were met with public jubilation when they arrived in Israel.

The navy's commander in chief during the operation was Rear-Admiral Avraham Botzer (Cheetah). The commanding officer of the operation was Captain Hadar Kimhi (later commodore commander of Haifa Navy-Base and naval attaché in Britain during the 1973 Yom Kippur War), with Commander Ezra Kedm Krishinski, nicknamed Karish (Shark) as his deputy (later commodore and commander of the Red Sea theatre). The boats were:

- INS Sufa (Storm), skipper Lt. Ronna Arie
- INS Ga'ash (Volcano), skipper Lt. Gil Koren
- INS Herev (Sword), skipper Lt. Commander Gadi Ben Zeev
- INS Hanit (Spear), skipper Lt. Commander Haim Shaked
- INS Hetz (Arrow), skipper Commander Moshe Tabak

Two young officers in the operation, Micha Ram and Alex Tal, went on to become commanders in chief of the navy.

The boats' names while being operated by the oil drilling company were Starboat 1, 2, 3, 4 and 5. The boats joined the already acquired INS Sa'ar to form the Sa'ar 3-class missile boats.

=== International repercussions ===
The French government expelled Mordechai Limon from France. It was said that the French president stated "I do not like tea with Lemon and Mokka coffee". Generals Louis Bonte and Bernard Cazelles were suspended by the government. Instead Israel turned to American supplies of weapons and support. The Israeli Air Force began to be equipped by American aircraft, while the United States Navy started to train the Israeli Navy's high command and increased the level of naval cooperation.

According to British intelligence writer Gordon Thomas, following the affair, Mossad agents were watched "as closely as any terrorist" when they were deployed to France to track down and kill Middle Eastern terrorists. Many times, terrorists would escape after being tipped off by a pro-Arab French intelligence officer.

== Missile boat flotilla ==
The boats taken from Cherbourg were still unarmed platforms on their arrival in Israel. They were brought into the navy and armed with Gabriel missiles and ECM and EW systems produced by MABAT and RAFAEL. Their commissioning into the Israeli Navy was overseen by Commodore Yehoshua Lahav Schneidemesser, a Haganah member who had volunteered with the Royal Navy during the Second World War, and who was at the time the division head of Equipment and Platforms.

The flotilla's working up was overseen by Captain Hadar Kimhi, who was later promoted to commodore commanding the Naval base of Haifa. New concepts of sea missile warfare were developed by the navy and new ECM/EW techniques were developed with the leadership of Captain Herut Zemach who was awarded the Israel Defense Prize for his efforts, creating a new generation of missile boats. Later, new Israeli Sa'ar boats were developed and built in Haifa Shipyards under the leadership of Haim Schachal, the chief engineer of the Israel Shipyards.

Two of the boats were launched a few months before the Yom Kippur War, INS Reshef (Flash) and INS Keshet (Bow), Sa'ar 4 class missile boats. For his leadership, Schachal was awarded the Israel Defense Prize. The Israeli Navy went on to win the sea battles with the Egyptian and Syrian navies with zero casualties and losses. The Israeli Navy became a pioneer in modern naval missile warfare, resulting in their successes in the Yom Kippur War in 1973.

== See also ==
- Israeli Navy
- INS Dakar
- Military equipment of Israel
- France–Israel relations

== Videos and recordings ==
- Experiments of RAFAEL Gabriel Missile
- Geva News arrival of the boats to Kishon harbor Haifa December 1969
- Video taken from INS Gaash (Vulcano) showing fueling from M.V Lea stern.The officer with the radio is Commander Ezra Kedem Carish (Shark)
- Video of the boats arrival to Haifa and Charles De Gaulle's speech in the French TV and Israeli TV
- The Boats Story Press Conference of Georges Jean Raymond Pompidou French TV on YouTube
- IDF Radio an interview with Mordechai Mokka Limon, start time 45:13 in Hebrew
- The Boats of Cherbourg Documentary on YouTube
- The Boats of Cherbourg with Mokka Limon, Tabbak, Ezra Kedem "Karish"and French Officials on YouTube
- Diving to Sufa part 1 in French on YouTube
- Diving to Sufa part 2 in French on YouTube
- Diving to Sufa part 3 in French on YouTube

== Retrofits for Noa Operation ==
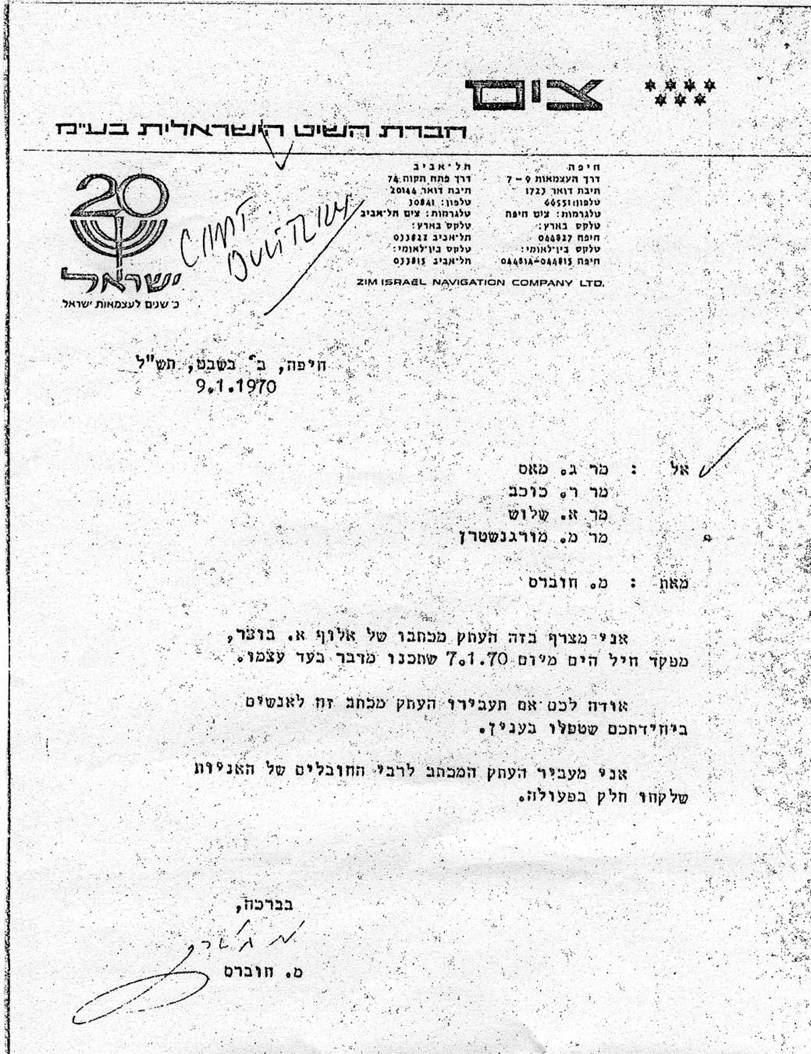
Internal message sent by ZIM Chief Operation Officer Mr. Hovars notifying about the letter of Rear Admiral Avraham Botzer awarding ZIM for its contribution on operation Noa

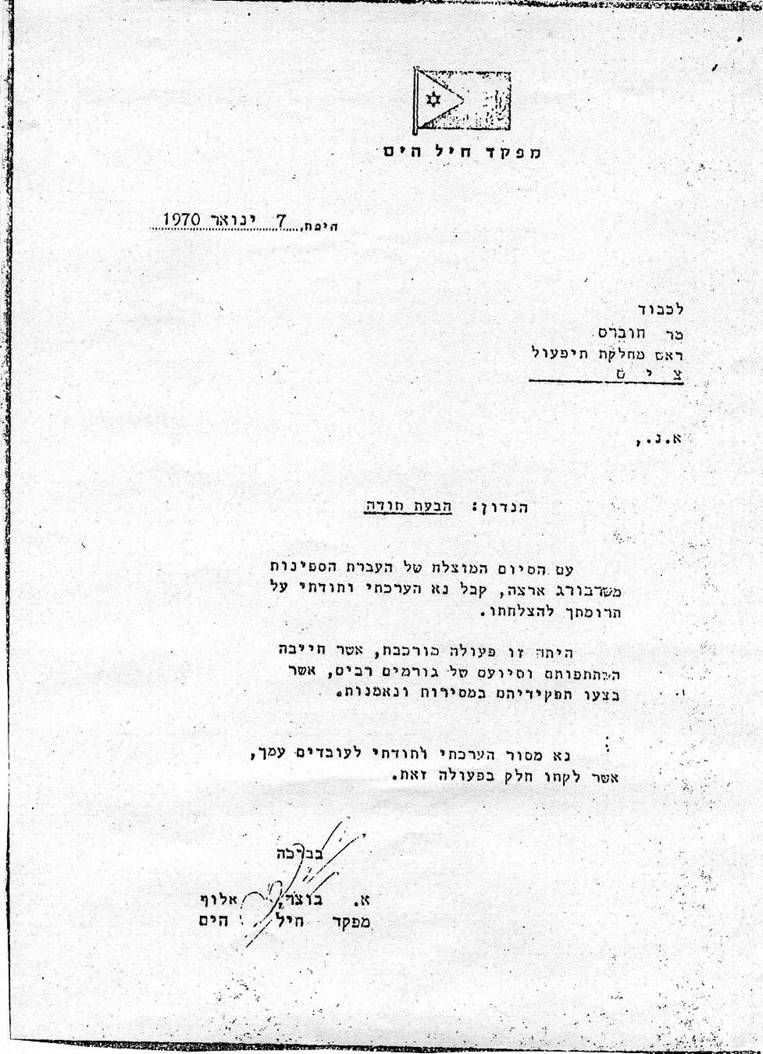
The letter of Awards from Rear Admiral Avraham Botzer to Zim Navigation Company Chief Engineer Alexander Zviren and Naval Architect Edmond Wilhelm Brillant
