= Avraham Botzer =

Israeli Navy general (1929–2012)

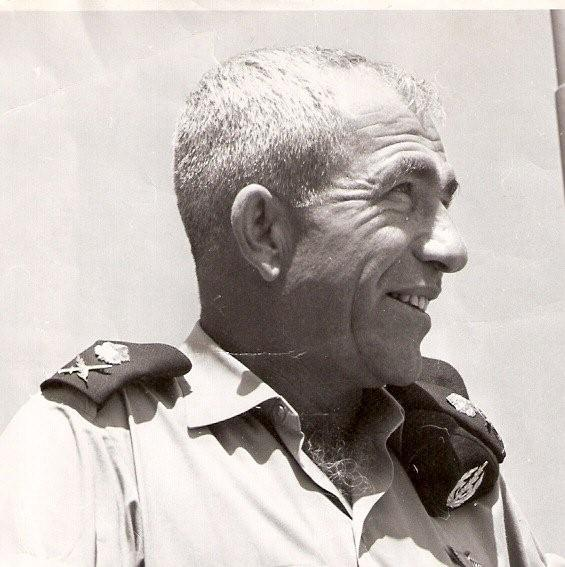
- Native name: אברהם בוצר
- Born: 25 July 1929; Łuków, Poland
- Died: 2 June 2012 (aged 82) Tel Aviv, Israel
- Allegiance: Israel
- Branch: Israeli Navy
- Service years: 1946–1972
- Rank: Aluf
- Commands: Commander of the Israeli Navy
- Conflicts: 1947–1949 Palestine war Suez Crisis; Six-Day War; War of Attrition
- Other work: CEO of the Trans-Israel pipeline

Avraham Botzer (Hebrew: אברהם בוצר; 25 July 1929 – 2 June 2012) was the Commander of the Israeli Navy between 1968 and 1972.

== Biography ==
=== Pre-establishment of the State of Israel ===
Botzer was born in 1929 in Poland and was taken to Palestine in 1936 at the age of 7. In 1946 he joined the Palmach and in 1947 he took part in operations to smuggle Jews from post-Holocaust Europe into Mandate Palestine (the British prohibited Jewish emigration to Palestine, see White Paper of 1939). In one of his operations Botzer was caught and expelled to Cyprus internment camps, after two weeks he was sent back to Palestine because of his young age.

=== Post-establishment of the State of Israel ===
With the outbreak of the 1947–1949 Palestine war, Botzer joined the newly formed Israeli Navy. After the war, Botzer remained in the navy and by 1952 he was promoted to the rank of Captain. Botzer continued to serve in the Israeli Navy taking part in operations and the Suez Crisis.

During the Six-Day War, Botzer command the Red Sea Fleet in which his forces conquered Sharm el-Sheikh.

=== Commander of the Israeli Navy ===
In September 1968, Botzer was promoted to the rank of Aluf and given command of the Israeli Navy.

Botzer commanded the Israeli Navy during the War of Attrition. His most important operations were as follows:

Operation Bulmus 6 – a military raid conducted by special operations units of the Israel Defense Forces (IDF) against an Egyptian early warning radar and ELINT station located on a small island in the Gulf of Suez on the night of 19 July 1969.

Operation Escort – on 7 September 1969, Israeli commandos blew up Egyptian Navy torpedo boats in the northern tip of the Gulf of Suez. This was necessary in order for the IDF to carry out Operation Raviv, a highly successful invasion of the western shore of the Gulf.

Operation Raviv – on 9 September 1969, Israeli Navy landing craft vehicles allowed for the Israeli raid against Egypt's Red Sea coast.

Cherbourg Project – the Boats of Cherbourg (Hebrew: ספינות שרבורג) was an Israeli military operation which took place on 24 December 1969, and involved the escape of five class 3 missile boats from the French port of Cherbourg. The boats had been paid for by the Israeli government but had not been delivered due to the French arms embargo in 1969. The whole operation was planned by the Israeli Navy, and was codenamed "Operation Noa", after the daughter of Captain Binyamin (Bini) Telem.

Botzer helped build up the Israeli Navy tremendously. Up until his time the Navy had always been second to the ground and air forces of the IDF, under Botzer they would become just as important. Under his command the Israeli Navy bought three submarines, missile boats, corvettes, state of the art torpedoes and missiles, all of which would prove to be imperative during the Yom Kippur War.

On 1 September 1972, Botzer resigned from his post as Commander of the Israeli Navy.

=== After retirement ===
Botzer became the CEO of the Trans-Israel pipeline where he worked for over 20 years. He also studied law and became a successful attorney. He died (by committing suicide) on June 2nd, 2012.
