= Alex Tal =

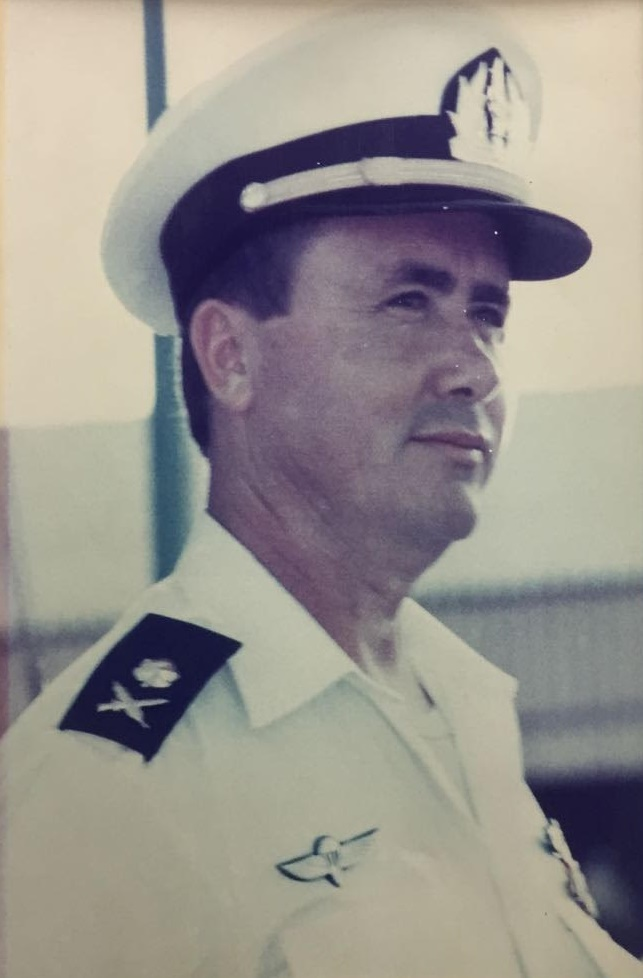
- Native name: אלכס טל
- Born: 1946 (age 79–80); Lviv, Ukrainian SSR, USSR
- Allegiance: Israel
- Branch: Israeli Navy
- Service years: 1964–1996
- Rank: Aluf
- Commands: Commander of the Israeli Navy
- Conflicts: Six-Day War; War of Attrition; Yom Kippur War; 1982 Lebanon War; South Lebanon conflict First Intifada

Alex Tal (Hebrew: אלכס טל; born 1946 USSR) was the Commander of the Israeli Navy.

== Naval career ==
Alex Tal made aliyah from the Soviet Union in 1964 and enlisted in the Israeli Navy. After his training he served on the first Missile boat the Israeli Navy received. He also participated in the Cherbourg Project. During the Yom Kippur War, he participated in Battle of Latakia as a captain of one of the missile boats. After the war, Tal continued to serve in the Israeli Navy. His posts included Commander of the missile boat fleet and the IDF Military attaché to Chile.

In 1996, he was promoted to the rank of Aluf and became Commander of the Israeli Navy. Under Tal's command the INS Dakar, whose location remained a mystery for nearly thirty years, was found. In 2000, Tal's term as commander of the Israeli Navy ended and he retired from the IDF.

Tal has a Master's degree in Economics from Bar-Ilan University, and a master's degree in Geography from the University of Haifa.
