= Latakia (disambiguation) =

Latakia is a city in Syria.

Latakia also may refer to:

- Latakia (tobacco), originally produced in Syria
- Battles fought in or near the city:
  - Battle of Latakia (7 October 1973), a naval battle of the Yom Kippur War
  - Second Battle of Latakia (11 October 1973), a naval battle of the Yom Kippur War
  - Siege of Latakia (August 2011), Syrian Arab Spring, Syrian Civil War
  - Latakia offensive (disambiguation), Syrian Civil War
- Zones in or near the city:
  - Latakia Camp, a Palestinian refugee camp
  - Latakia Ridge, tectonic plate in the region
  - Latakia Sports City, a sport complex in Latakia, Syria
  - Latakia Air Base, a Russian airbase in the Syrian airforce base Khmeimim Air Base
- Other governmental divisions named for the city:
  - Modern:
    - Latakia District, a Syrian district (mantiqah) administratively belonging to Latakia Governorate
    - Latakia Governorate, a governorate in Syria
  - Ancient Roman Laodicea in Syria, AKA Laodicea ad mare
