= Latakia offensive =

The Latakia offensive refer to a series of battles to take control of the Latakia Governorate during the Syrian Civil War:

- 2013 Latakia offensive: A failed rebel offensive launched in August 2013 to capture the Latakia Governorate from Government forces.
- 2014 Latakia offensive: The second rebel offensive in the Latakia Governorate launched on 21 March 2014 by rebel Islamist groups including Al-Nusra Front.
- 2015–16 Latakia offensive: A Syrian Government offensive launched in November 2015 to capture rebel-held territory bordering Turkey.
- 2016 Latakia offensive: A failed rebel counter-offensive launched in June 2016 to seize the territory previously lost in the 2015–16 offensive.

== See also ==
- Battle of Latakia (7 October 1973), a naval battle of the Yom Kippur War
- Second Battle of Latakia (11 October 1973), a naval battle of the Yom Kippur War
- Siege of Latakia (August 2011), Syrian Arab Spring, Syrian Civil War
- Latakia (disambiguation)
