= October-class missile boat =

Egyptian naval vessel

Class overview
- Name: October class
- Builders: Alexandria Shipyard, Egypt; Vosper Thornycroft, United Kingdom
- Operators: Egyptian Navy
- Preceded by: Komar class
- Built: 1975–1976
- In commission: 1979–present
- Planned: 6
- Completed: 6
- Active: 4
- Laid up: 2

General characteristics
- Type: Missile boat
- Displacement: 71 long tons (72 t) standard; 82 long tons (83 t) full load
- Length: 84 ft (26 m)
- Beam: 20 ft (6.1 m)
- Draught: 5 ft (1.5 m)
- Propulsion: 4 CRM 12 D/SS diesel engines; 4 shafts, 5,400 hp (4,000 kW)
- Speed: 38 knots (70 km/h; 44 mph)
- Range: 400 nmi (740 km; 460 mi) at 30 knots (56 km/h; 35 mph)
- Complement: 20
- Sensors & processing systems: Marconi S 810 surface search radar; Marconi/ST 802 fire control radar
- Armament: 2 × OTO Melara Otomat surface-to-surface missiles; 2 × twin Type 32 30 mm/75 AA guns

The October class is a series of six missile boats constructed for the Egyptian Navy in the mid-1970s as a replacement for the aging Komar-class missile boats. The design of the vessels is based on the Komar class and the six ships were constructed at Alexandria, Egypt and completed by Vosper Thornycroft at Portsmouth, United Kingdom. They entered service in the late 1970s. Two were removed from service and four are still active.

== Design and description ==
The October class is based on the Soviet Komar-class missile boats, which had been acquired by the Egyptian Navy in 1962. The October class have wooden hulls and have a standard displacement of 71 long tons (72 t) and 82 long tons (83 t) at full load. Their small size leads to very cramped conditions for the crew, with access to the engine room through a removable operations room. The missile boats are 84 feet (26 m) long with a beam of 20 feet (6.1 m) and a draught of 5 feet (1.5 m). The vessels are propelled by four CRM 12 D/SS diesel engines turning four shafts, rated at 5,400 horsepower (4,000 kW). This gives them a maximum speed of 38 knots (70 km/h; 44 mph) and a range of 400 nmi (740 km; 460 mi) at 30 knots (56 km/h; 35 mph). The missile boats have a complement of 20.

Missile boats in the class are armed with two OTO Melara Otomat surface-to-surface missiles and four Type 32 30 mm/75 guns in two twin mounts for anti-aircraft (AA) defence. The October class are fitted with Marconi S 810 surface search radar and Marconi/ST 802 fire control radar. They also mount a Racal Cutlass radar warning system and two Protean fixed decoy launchers.

== Vessels in class ==
October class
Name	Builder	Status
781	Alexandria Shipyard, Alexandria, Egypt	In service
783	Alexandria Shipyard, Alexandria, Egypt	In service
785	Alexandria Shipyard, Alexandria, Egypt	Laid up
787	Alexandria Shipyard, Alexandria, Egypt	In service
789	Alexandria Shipyard, Alexandria, Egypt	In service
791	Alexandria Shipyard, Alexandria, Egypt	Non-operational

== Construction and history ==
Six October-class missile boats were ordered by the Egyptian Navy to replace the Komar-class missile boats already in service. They were constructed at the shipyard in Alexandria, Egypt and launched in 1975–1976. The incomplete missile boats were then taken to Portsmouth, United Kingdom to have the missiles and electronics installed by Vosper Thornycroft and the vessels completed between 1979 and 1981. The October-class vessels were initially named 207, 208, 209, 210, 211 and 212. The final pair to complete, 207 and 212 arrived in Egypt on 25 April 1981. The ships were renumbered to their current names and 791, while being carried aboard a freighter, was lost overboard during the delivery voyage on 16 December 1980. The missile boat was salvaged on 30 June 1981. 791 then underwent repairs, which were completed on 13 August 1982. By 2009, 785 was laid up and 791 was non-operational.
