= P-15 Termit =

P-15 Termit SS-N-2 Styx
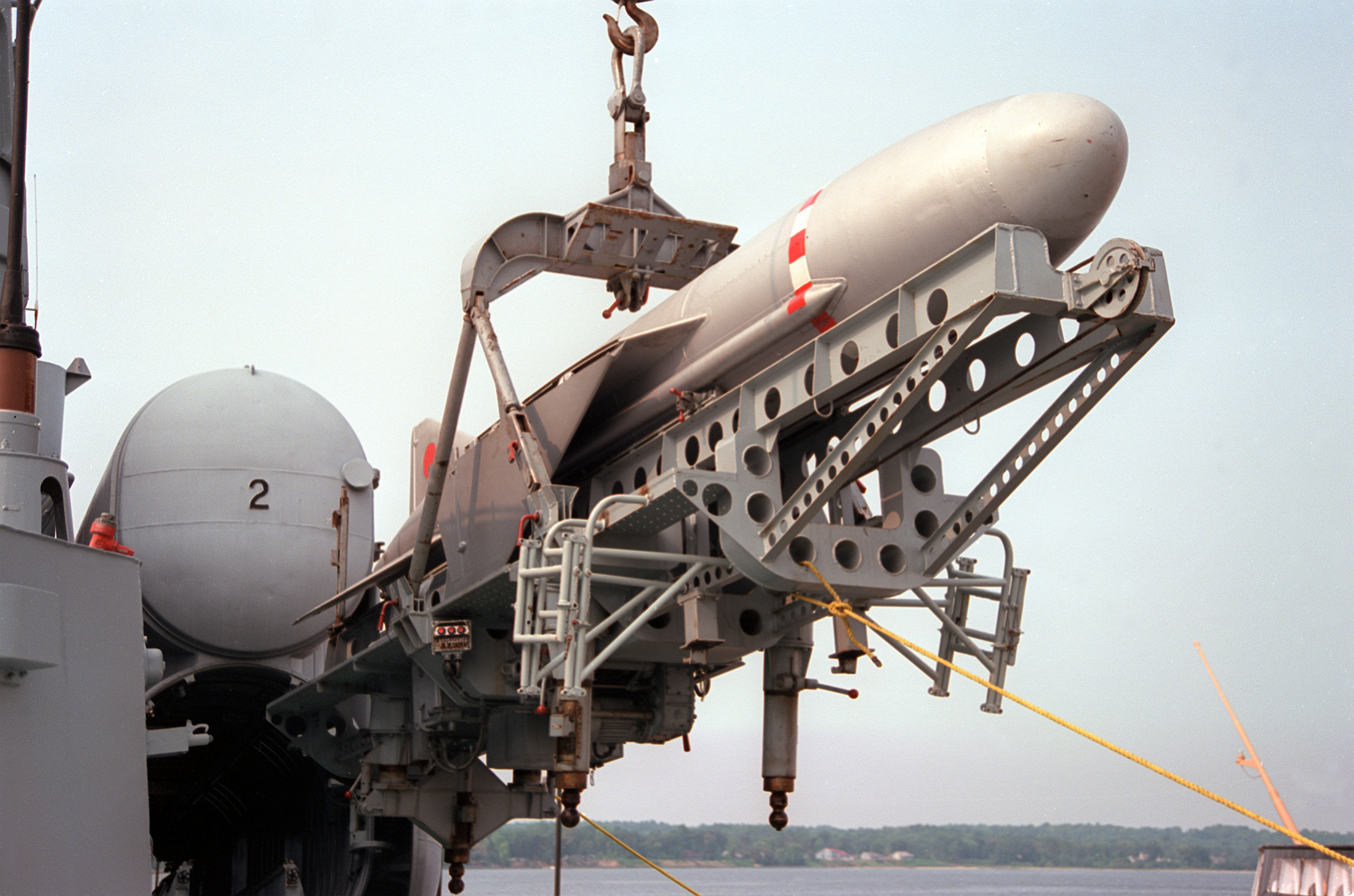
- A P-15M missile (SS-N-2c) being unloaded from a former East German Navy Tarantul-class missile boat
- Type: Anti-ship missile Cruise missile
- Place of origin: Soviet Union

Service history
- In service: 1960–present

Production history
- Manufacturer: MKB Raduga

Specifications
- Mass: 2,580 kg (5,690 lb)
- Length: 5.8 m (19 ft)
- Diameter: 0.76 m (2 ft 6 in)
- Wingspan: 2.4 m (7 ft 10 in)
- Warhead: 454 kg (1,001 lb) hollow charge high explosive
- Engine: Liquid-propellant rocket, solid-propellant rocket booster
- Operational range: 40 kilometres (25 mi) / 80 kilometres (50 mi)
- Flight altitude: 25 to 100 metres (82 to 328 ft)
- Maximum speed: Mach 0.95
- Guidance system: INS, active radar homing, supplemented in some with infrared homing
- Launch platform: naval ships, ground launch

The P-15 Termit (Russian: П-15 "Термит"; English: termite) is an anti-ship cruise missile developed by the Soviet Union's Raduga design bureau in the 1950s. Its GRAU designation was 4K40, its NATO reporting name was Styx or SS-N-2. China acquired the design in 1958 and created at least four versions: the CSS-N-1 Scrubbrush and CSS-N-2 versions were developed for ship-launched operation, while the CSS-C-2 Silkworm and CSS-C-3 Seersucker were used for coastal defence. Other names for this basic type of missile include: HY-1, SY-1, and FL-1 Flying Dragon (Chinese designations typically differ for export and domestic use, even for otherwise identical equipment), North Korean local produced KN-1 or KN-01, derived from both Silkworm variants and Russian & USSR P-15, Rubezh, P-20 P-22 .

Despite its large size, thousands of P-15s were built and installed on many classes of ships from missile boats/fast attack craft to destroyers, coastal batteries, and bomber aircraft (Chinese versions).

== Origins ==
The P-15 was not the first anti-ship missile in Soviet service; that distinction goes to the SS-N-1 Scrubber, and to the aircraft-launched AS-1 Kennel. The SS-N-1 was a powerful but rather raw system, and it was soon superseded by the SS-N-3 Shaddock. This weapon was fitted to 4,000-ton Kynda-class cruisers and replaced an initial plan for 30,000-ton battlecruisers armed with 305 mm (12.0 in) and 45 mm (1.8 in) guns. Rather than rely on a few heavy and costly ships, a new weapons system was designed to fit smaller, more numerous vessels, while maintaining sufficient striking power. The P-15 was developed by the Soviet designer Beresyniak, who helped in the development of the BI rocket interceptor.

== Design ==
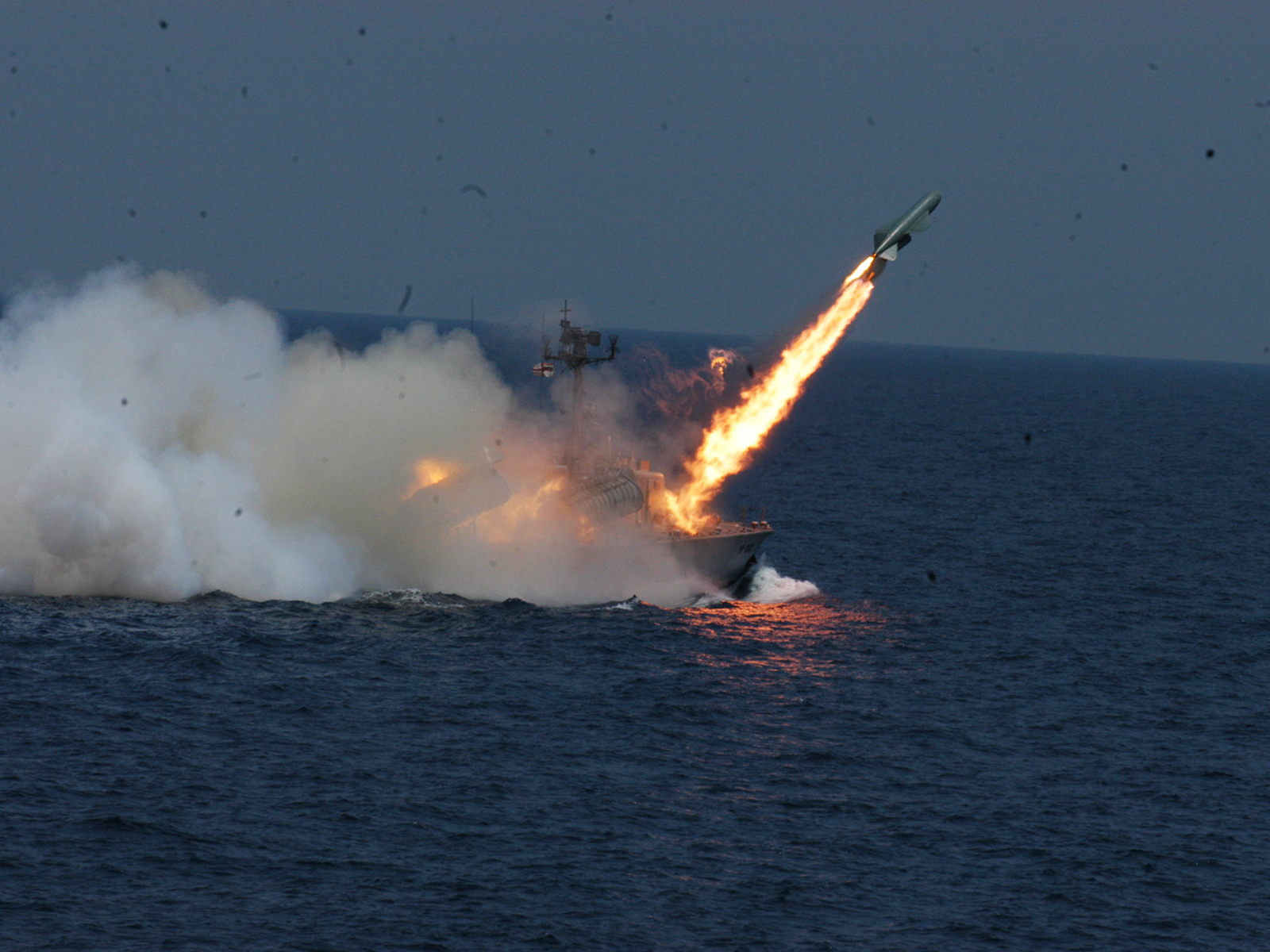
INS Chamak of the Indian Navy fires a P-15 Termit missile

The first variant was the P-15, with fixed wings. The basic design of the missile, retained for all subsequent versions, featured a cylindrical body, a rounded nose, two delta wings in the center and three control surfaces in the tail. It was also fitted with a solid-fueled booster under the belly. This design was based on the Yak-1000 experimental fighter built in 1951.

The weapon was meant to be cheap, yet still give an ordinary missile boat the same 'punch' as a battleship salvo. The onboard electronics were based on a simple analog design, with a homing conical scanning radar sensor. It used a more reliable rocket engine with acid fuel in preference to a turbojet.

Some shortcomings were never totally solved, due to the liquid propellant of the rocket engine: the acid fuel gradually corroded the missile fuselage. Launches were not possible outside a temperature range of −15 to 38 °C (5 to 100 °F).

The missile weighed around 2,340 kilograms (5,160 lb), had a top speed of Mach 0.9 and a range of 40 kilometres (25 mi). The explosive warhead was behind the fuel tank, and as the missile retained a large amount of unburned fuel at the time of impact, even at maximum range, it acted as an incendiary device.

The warhead was a 500-kilogram (1,100 lb) shaped charge, an enlarged version of a high-explosive anti-tank (HEAT) warhead, larger than the semi-armour piercing (SAP) warhead typical of anti-ship missiles. The launch was usually made with the help of electronic warfare support measures (ESM) gear and Garpun radar at a range of between 5.5 and 27 kilometres (3.4 and 16.8 mi) due to the limits of the targeting system. The Garpun's range against a destroyer was about 20 kilometres (12 mi).

The onboard sensor was activated at 11 kilometres (6.8 mi) from impact, the missile would begin to descend at 1–2° to the target, because the flight pattern was about 120 to 250 metres (390 to 820 ft) above sea level. In minimum range engagements there was the possibility of using active sensors at shorter distances, as little as 2.75 kilometres (1.71 mi). The P-15U was introduced in 1965, with improved avionics and folding wings, enabling the use of smaller containers. It was replaced by the P-15M in 1972, which was a further development of the P-15U, with enhanced abilities (its export simplified variants were designated P-21 and P-22, depending on the sensor installed, and a whole export system was designated the P-20M).

== Versions ==
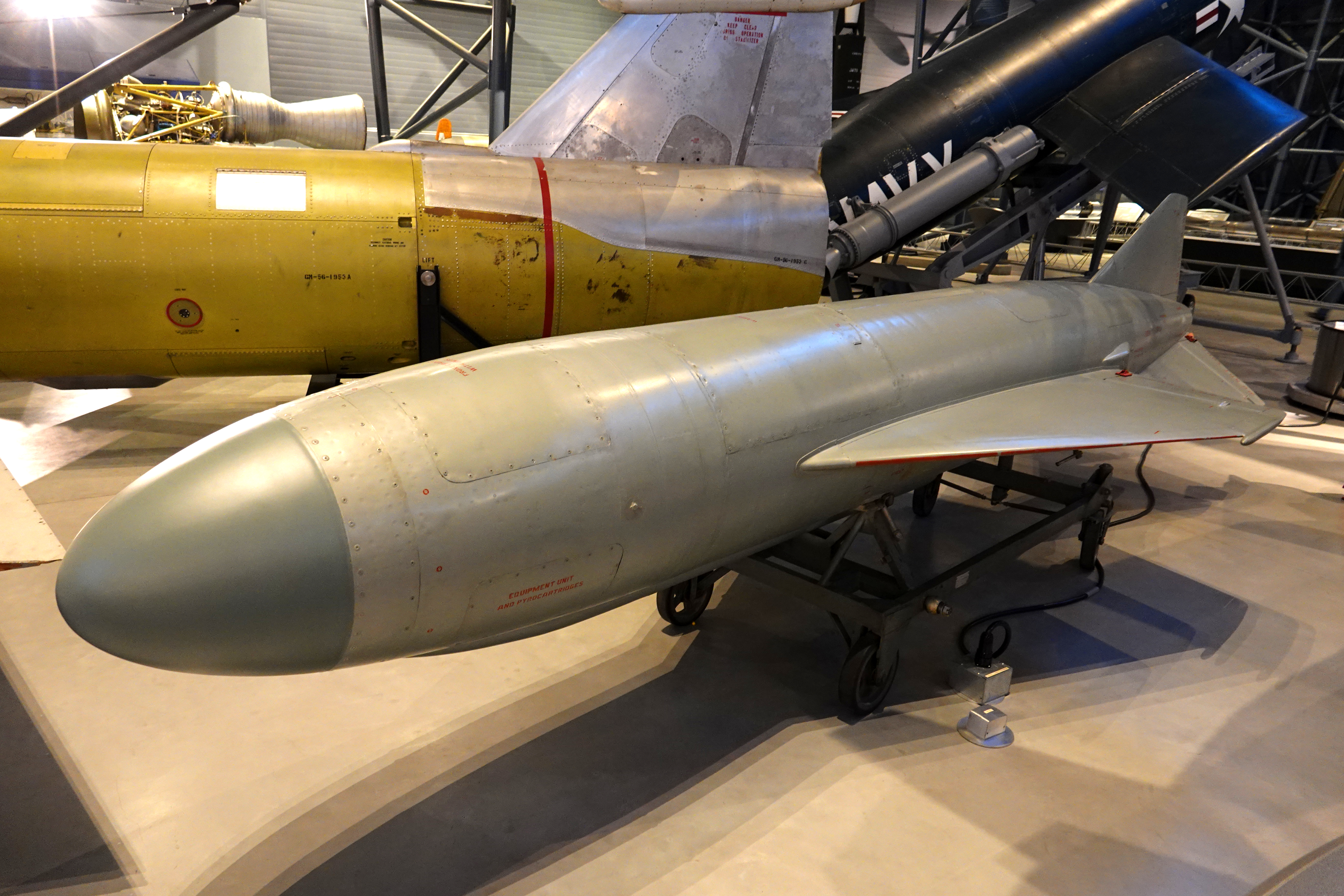
P-15 missile, Steven F. Udvar-Hazy Center

=== Russia ===
In total, the P-15 family had the following models:

- P-15: A basic (SS-N-2A) with I-band, a conical search sensor and 40 km (25 mi) range.
- P-15M: (SS-N-2C), heavier and longer than the P-15, it had a range of 80 km (50 mi) and several minor improvements.
- P-15MC: Essentially a P-15M, coupled with a Bulgarian-made electronic countermeasure package for that country's navy.
- P-20: A P-15 updated with the new guidance system but with the original shorter range. They were perhaps known as SS-N-2B and used by Komar and Osa-class boats.
- P-20K: A P-15M with a new guidance system.
- P-20M: A surface version of the P-20L with folding wings. This was the definitive version of the P-15M with radar guidance.
- P-22 other development of or along P-20; other variants P-21, P-27
- 4K51 Rubezh and 4K40, SS-N-2C SSC-3 Styx, using P-20 and P-22, Self-propelled missile

=== North Korea ===
- KN-1 or KN-01 locally produced Geum Seong-1 Korean 금성-1호, derived from both Silkworm and Russian P-15 Termit, Rubezh, P-20 P-22 .

=== Iraq ===
In 1989, during the Baghdad International Exhibition for Military Production Iraq unveiled a series of coastal defense missiles under the name Faw, most likely built with technical assistance from Yugoslavia and some help from Egypt, China and the Soviet Union:

- Faw-70: A locally built version of the P-20 or P-21 missile with a 513 kg (1,131 lb) warhead, minimum range of 5.4 km (3.4 mi) and maximum range of 70 km (43 mi). An autopilot guided the missile mid-course while the terminal phase guidance was either an active I-band radar or a passive infrared depending on the seeker head used.
- Faw-150: An improved version of the Faw-70, with an increased length from 6.5 m (21 ft) to 7.4 m (24 ft) and enlarged fuel tanks extending maximum range to 150 km (93 mi).
- Faw-200: Another extended-range variant of the Faw-70 with a length of 8 m (26 ft) and a maximum range of 200 km (120 mi).

After the 1991 Gulf War, the Faw missile remained in service with the Iraqi Armed Forces, although it was largely obsolete prior to the 2003 invasion of Iraq.

== Launch platforms ==
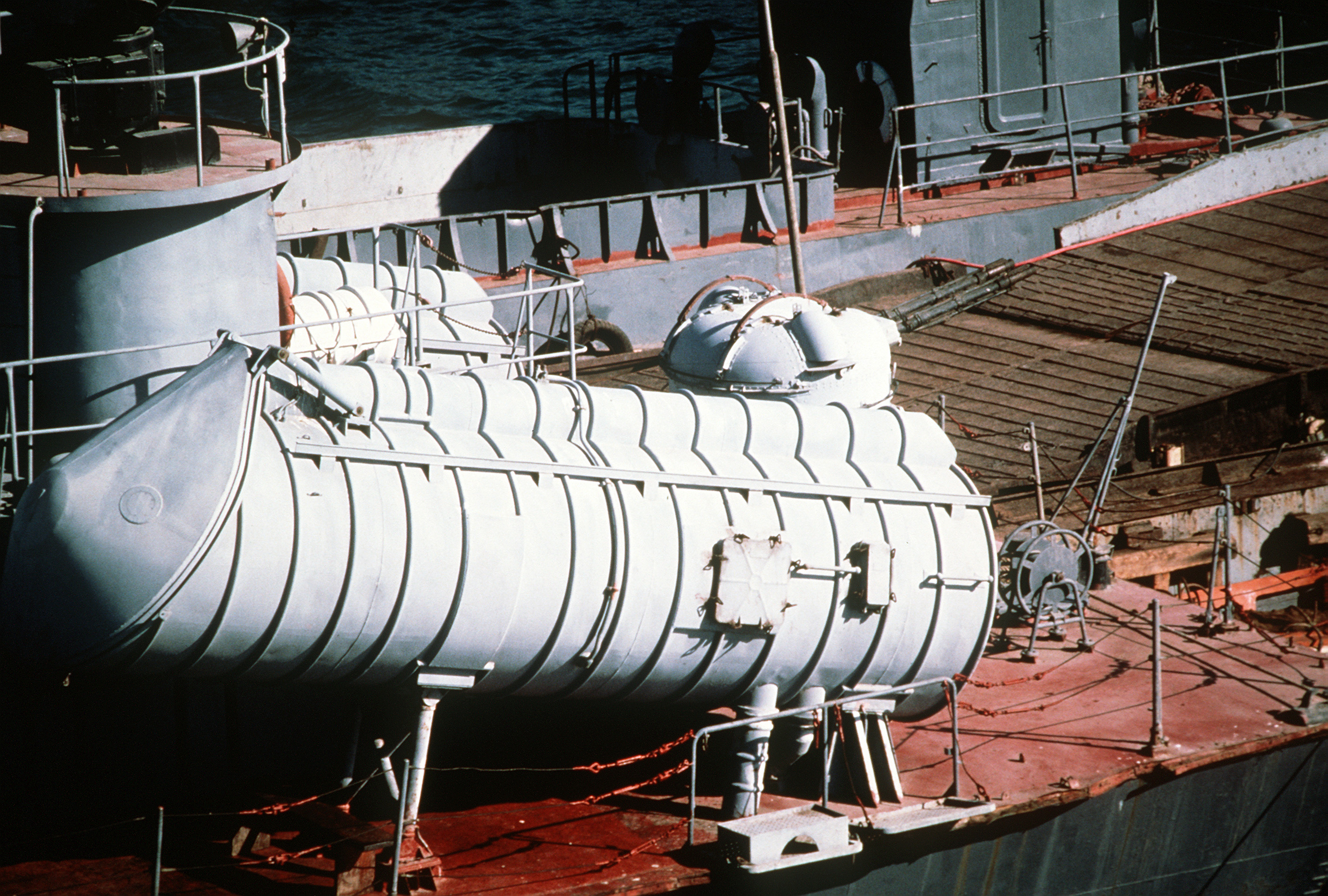
P-20 launcher on an Osa II-class fast attack craft, with wings folded

This missile, despite its mass, was used in small and medium ships, from 60 to 4,000 tons, shore batteries and (only for derived models) aircraft and submarines. The main users were:

- Komar-class missile boats
- Osa-class missile boats
- Vidyut-class missile boats (Indian version of OSA-1 class)
- Chamak-class missile boat (Indian version of OSA-2 class)
- Tarantul-class corvette
- Veer-class corvette (Indian licence built version of Tarantul class)
- Nanuchka-class corvettes
- Durg-class corvette (Indian derivative of Nanuchka class)
- Koni-class frigates
- Kotor-class frigates
- The frigate Mărășești
- Kildin-class destroyers
- Kashin-class destroyers
- Rajput-class destroyers (Indian version of Kashin class)

== Operational usage ==
=== War of Attrition ===
On 21 October 1967, four months after the Six-Day War, Egyptian Komar-class missile boats based on Port Said fired four P-15 missiles against INS Eilat. Three missiles hit their target, which sank with a loss of 47 crew members and leaving 90–100 wounded. This was the first time anti-ship missiles were used in combat.

In May 1968, missile boats sank the Israeli fishing boat Orit off El Arish with a P-15, showing that the guidance system was capable of tracking small targets. In response, the Israeli military began developing electronic countermeasures.

=== Indo-Pakistani War ===
During the Indo-Pakistani War of 1971, Indian Osa-class missile boats raided the port of Karachi in two different occasions. On the intervening night of 4–5 December 1971, INS Nirghat, INS Nipat, and INS Veer sank the destroyer Khaibar, while the destroyer Badr was damaged. The Pakistanis later reported that six wrecks were located in the harbor approaches, including the Liberian-registered SS Venus Challenger, which sank with all hands after being struck by a single P-15. On the night of 8 December 1971, the Indian missile boats launched P-15 missiles against an oil tank farm at Kemari and nearby ships, including the British SS Harmattan which was hit by a missile and set on fire while on anchor, and the Greek ship Gulf Star which sank after being struck by two missiles.

=== Vietnam War ===
In April 1972 the United States Navy claimed to have been attacked by a North Vietnamese SS-N-2 Styx missile during the Battle of Đồng Hới and shot it down with Terrier missiles, though the aerial target itself was never visually confirmed. According to Couper, it appears that North Vietnam did not receive any Styx missiles during the Vietnam War, making the US Navy claims dubious.

=== Yom Kippur War ===
Despite these early successes, the 1973 Yom Kippur War saw P-15 missiles used by the Egyptian and Syrian navies prove ineffective against Israeli ships. The Israeli Navy had phased out their old ships, building a fleet of Sa'ar 3-class fast attack craft: faster, smaller, more maneuverable and equipped with new missiles and countermeasures.

Although the range of the P-15 was twice that of the Israeli Gabriel, allowing Arab ships to fire first, radar jamming and chaff degraded their accuracy. In the Battle of Latakia and Battle of Baltim, several dozen P-15s were fired and all missed. Arab ships did not possess heavy firepower required for surface combat against enemy vessels, usually only 25 and 30 mm guns, and Osa and Komar boats were not always able to outrun their Israeli pursuers.

=== Iran–Iraq War ===
P-15 variants, including the Chinese duplication "Silkworm", were employed by Iran against Iraq in the 1980–1988 Iran–Iraq War, with some success. The length of the Iranian coastline allowed their missile shore batteries to control a large part of the Persian Gulf, especially around the Straights of Hormuz.

Iraq also acquired Silkworms, some with an IR homing ability. Iraqi Osa-class missile boats equipped with SS-N-2 used them against the IRIN navy, managed to hit and sink an Iranian Kaman-class fast attack craft, but sustained heavy losses, especially from Iranian Harpoons and Mavericks. Iraqi forces combined SS-N-2 (P-15 Termit) launched from Tu-22, Exocet missiles launched from Mirage F1 and Super Etendard, as well as Silkworm missiles and C-601 missiles launched from Tu-16 and H-6 bombers, bought from the Soviet Union and China to engage the Iranian Navy and tankers carrying Iranian oil.

=== Gulf War (1990–1991) ===
During the First Gulf War the Iraqis fired two Silkworms against Coalition ships on 25 February 1991. One suffered a mechanical failure and crashed into the sea, while the other headed for battleship USS Missouri, which was escorting a fleet of minesweepers engaged in coastal anti-mine operations. USS Missouri launched flares and chaff to spoof the missile while HMS Gloucester engaged the Silkworm with a salvo of Sea Dart missiles which destroyed it after it had missed its target.

== Operators ==
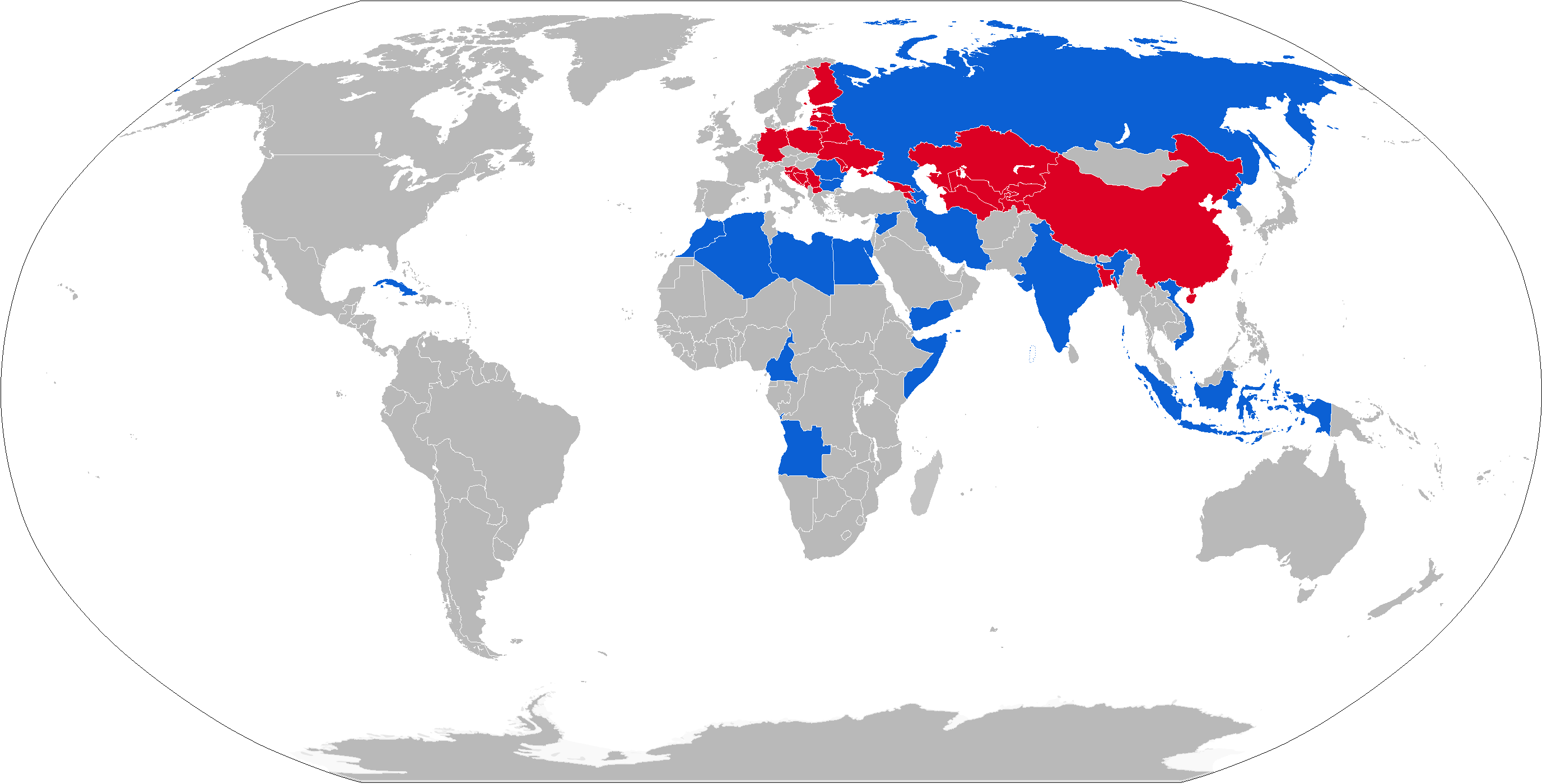
Map with P-15 Termit operators in blue and former operators in red

The P-15 missile family and their clones were widely deployed from the 1960s.

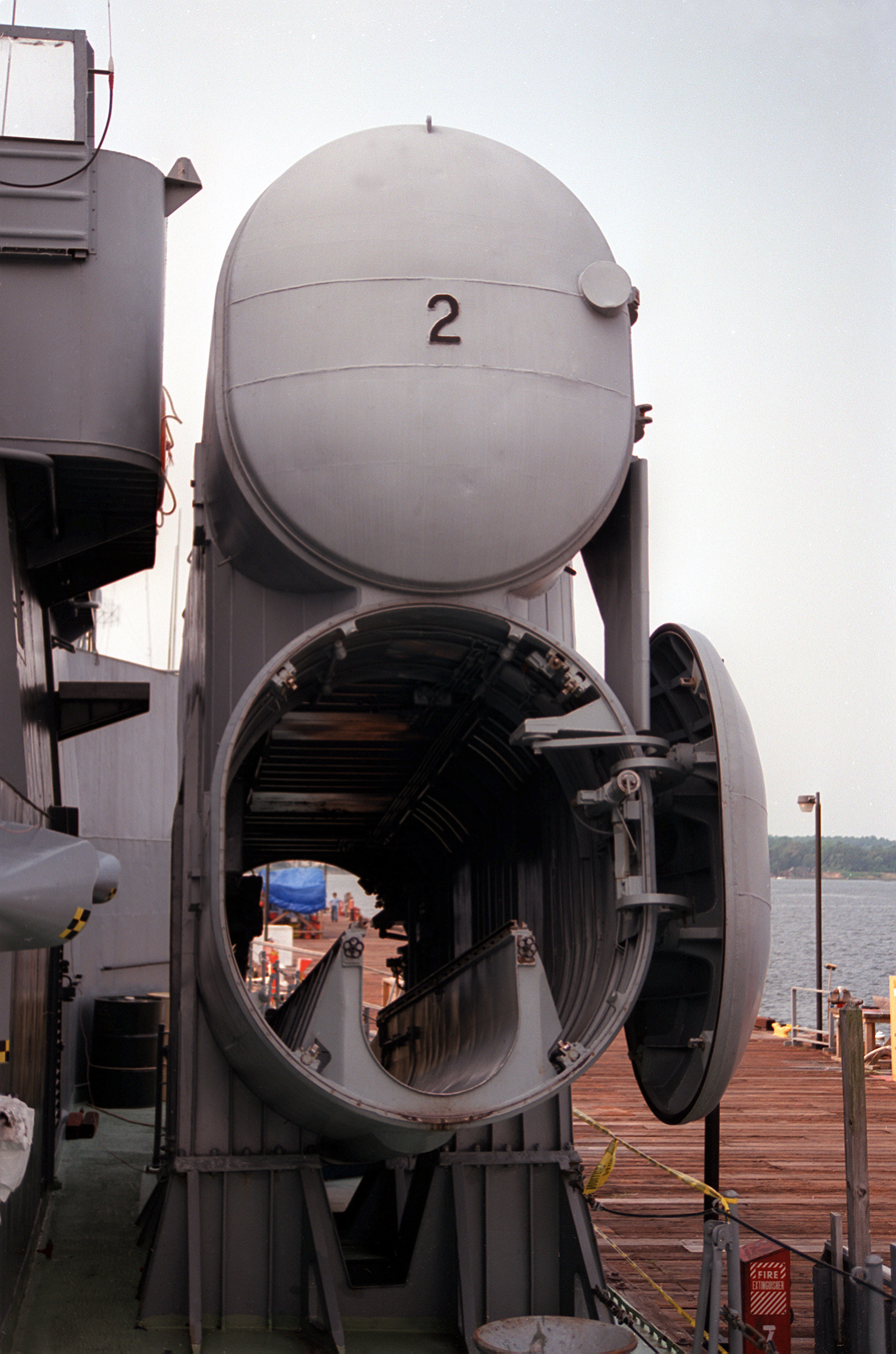
A twin vertical launcher aboard the German corvette Hiddensee. Note the support for the ventral booster.

The German Navy, after reunification, gave its stock of almost 200 P-15s to the United States Navy in 1991, these weapons being mainly the P-15M/P-22. They were used for missile defence tests.

=== Current ===
- Algerian National Navy – P-20U and 4K51 Rubezh.
- Cuban Revolutionary Navy – P-22, P-20U, and 4K51 Rubezh.
- Egyptian Navy – P-20.
- Indian Navy – P-27 Termit-R mounted on destroyers and corvettes.
- Islamic Republic of Iran Navy – HY-2.
- Libyan Navy – P-22.
- Korean People's Navy – P-15, P-20, HY-1 and Kumsong-3.
- People's Liberation Army Navy – HY-1, HY-2, and HY-4.
- Romanian Naval Forces – P-22.
- Russian Navy – P-22 Mounted on Tarantul-class corvettes and 4K51 Rubezh on coastal batteries.
- Syrian Navy – P-15M and P-22.
- Vietnam People's Navy – P-15, P-20, and 4K51 Rubezh.

=== Former ===
- Angolan Navy – retired from service.
- Azerbaijani Navy – retired from service.
- Bangladesh Navy – HY-1 and HY-2 used on Type 021-class missile boats and Type 024 missile boats, retired from service.
- Bulgarian Navy – P-22, used until 2021.
- Finnish Navy – retired from service.
- Volksmarine – passed on to Germany.
- German Navy – used on the Hiddensee (ex-Rudolf Egelhofer).
- Border Police of Georgia – P-15M missiles transferred from Ukraine in 1999 for the Matka-class missile boat, Tbilisi.
- Ethiopian Navy – passed on to Eritrea.
- Eritrean Navy – acquired from Ethiopia. Out of service in 2004.
- Indonesian Navy – used on Komar-class missile boats.
- Iraqi Navy – HY-2, Faw-70, Faw-150, and Faw-200 missiles included.
- Montenegrin Navy – retired from service.
- Polish Navy – P-21/22 used until 2014.
- Somali Navy – out of service after the Somali Civil War.
- South Yemen – passed on to the unified Yemeni state.
- Soviet Navy – passed on to successor states.
- Ukrainian Navy – operated some prior to the Russian invasion of Ukraine.
- Yemeni Navy – acquired after the Yemeni unification. Non-operational after the civil war.
- Yugoslav Navy – passed on to successor states.

=== Captured-only operators ===
- United States Navy, for experimental activities.
- Pakistan Navy, acquired from Egyptian Navy for experimental activities only, no deployment.
