= Micha Ram =

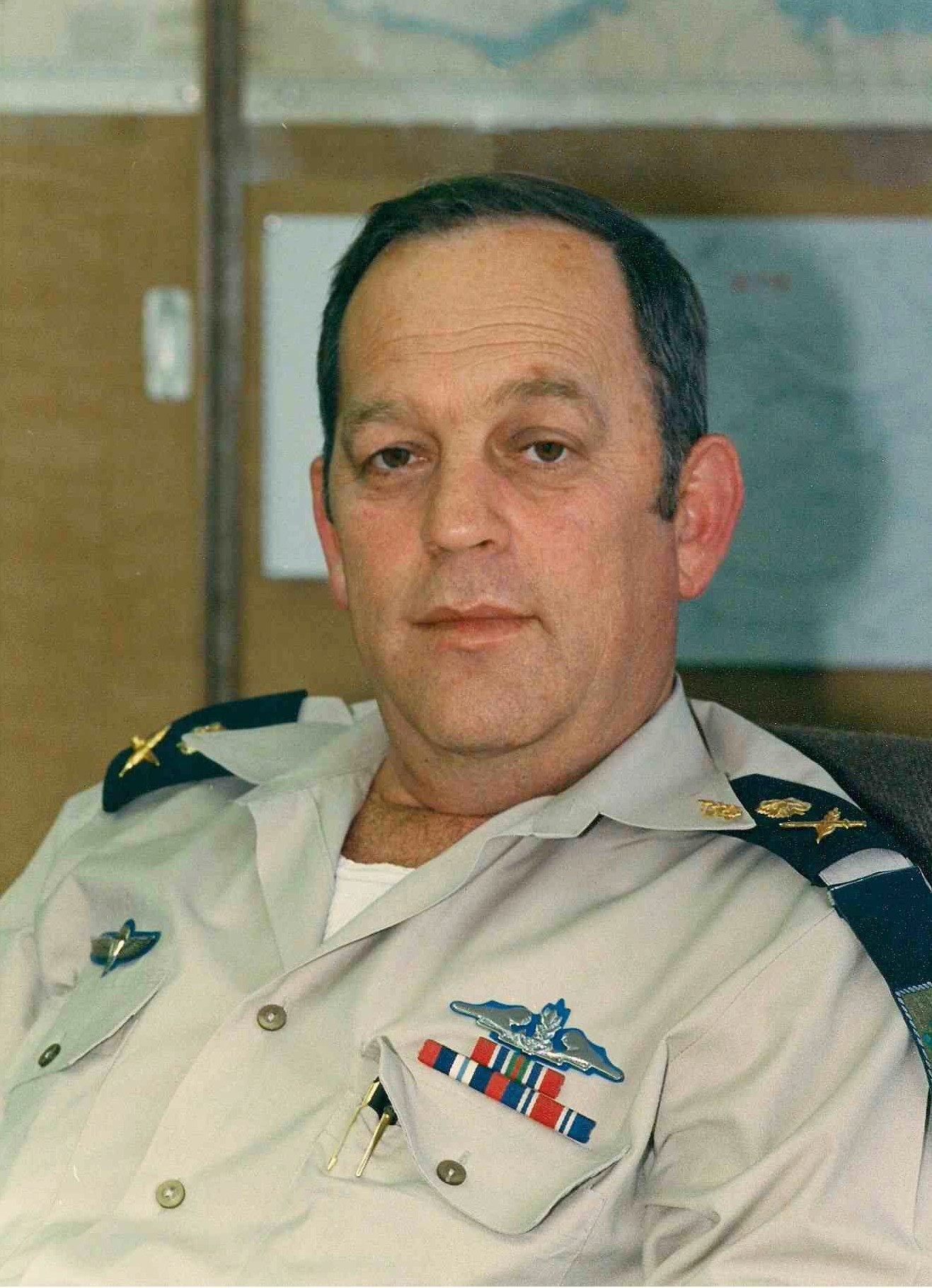
- Native name: מיכה רם
- Born: 4 July 1942; Kfar Bialik, Mandatory Palestine
- Died: 14 January 2018 (aged 75)
- Allegiance: Israel
- Branch: Israeli Navy
- Service years: 1956–1992
- Rank: Aluf
- Commands: Sa'ar 4 class missile boat, Commander Israeli missile boat fleet, Assistant Commander of the Israeli Naval Fleet in the Red Sea, Commander of the Israeli Naval Intelligence arm, Israel's Military attaché to the United States, Commander of the Israeli Navy
- Conflicts: Suez Crisis; Six-Day War; War of Attrition; Yom Kippur War; 1982 Lebanon War; South Lebanon conflict First Intifada

Micha Ram (Hebrew: מיכה רם; July 4, 1942 – January 14, 2018) was an Israeli Aluf (Military reserve) in the Israel Defense Forces. He was the Commander of the Israeli Navy in the years 1989–1992.

== Early life and education ==
In 1956, at age 14, Ram joined a Naval Academy in Akko. He joined the missile fleet of the Israeli Navy. In early 1973, he became the commander of a Sa'ar 4 class missile boat. During the Yom Kippur War, his missile boat, along with four other missile boats under the command of General Michael Barkai, took part in the historic naval Battle of Latakia against the Syrian Navy. Two days later he was involved in Battle of Baltim.

== Career ==
By the 1970s, Ram became in charge of many roles in the command center of the Israeli Navy, and in 1975 he was given command of the Israeli missile boat fleet. In 1977, he was promoted to the rank of Aluf mishne and he became the assistant commander of the Israeli Naval Fleet in the Red Sea.

In 1980, he was promoted to the rank of Tat aluf and he became commander of the Israeli Naval Intelligence arm. After Operation Peace for the Galilee in 1982 Ram became Israel's Military attaché to the United States.

After his friend from basic training Avraham Ben-Shoshan became Commander of the Israeli Navy, Ram became in charge of Naval operations. Under his command, the Israeli Navy bought the new Sa'ar 5-class corvettes and the new Dolphin class submarine.

In 1989, Micha Ram became Commander of the Israeli Navy. Under his command, the Israeli Navy upgraded its Sa'ar 4 class missile boat to Sa'ar 4.5 class missile boat. The Israeli Navy took part in the Gulf War and the First Intifada. Under Ram the Israeli Navy transformed in order to combat the new threat of Palestinian terrorism.

In 1992, Ram finished his term as Commander of the Israeli Navy and subsequently retired from the Israeli Navy after 32 years of service.

=== Personal life ===
Ram was married to Chayah from the Simkin family, who were one of the founders of Petach Tikva. The couple had three children.
