= Benjamin Telem =

Israeli naval officer

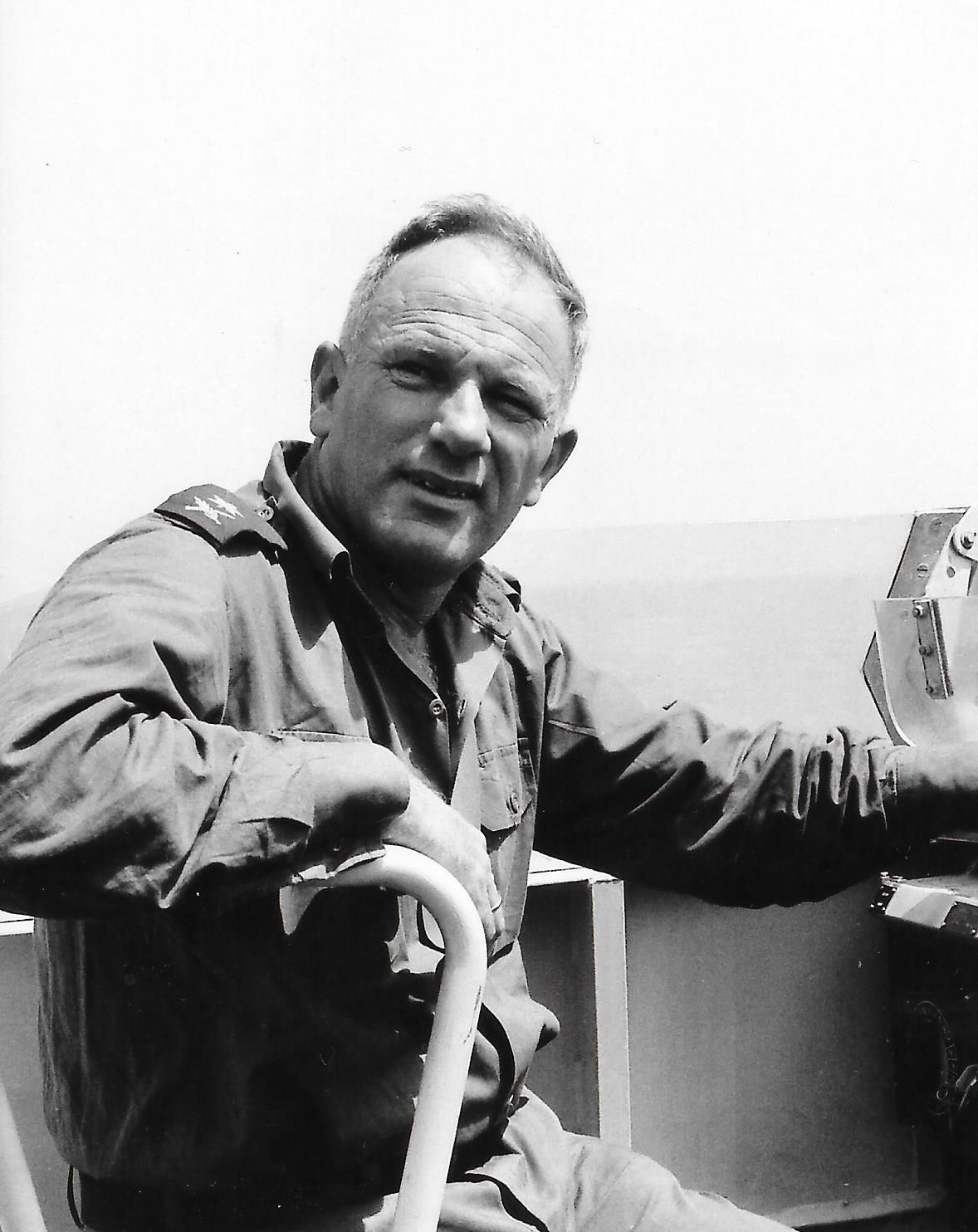
- Native name: בנימין תלם
- Born: 1928; Dessau, Province of Saxony, Prussia, Germany
- Died: 16 June 2008 (aged 79–80)
- Allegiance: Israel
- Branch: Israeli Navy
- Service years: 1950–1976
- Rank: Aluf
- Commands: Commander of the destroyer INS Yaffo, Commander of the Israeli Navy
- Conflicts: 1948 Arab-Israeli War; Suez Crisis; Six-Day War; War of Attrition; Yom Kippur War
- Other work: Assistant to the Ambassador to South Africa, CEO of Israel Military Industries

Benjamin Telem (Hebrew: בנימין תלם; 1928 – 16 June 2008) was the 9th Commander of the Israeli Navy (1972–1976).

== Early life and education ==
Born Benjamin Blumenthal in Dessau, Germany, in 1928, Telem immigrated to Haifa, during the Mandate era, as a child in 1933. He attended the Haifa Naval School, joining the Palyam shortly after graduation. Later on in his career Telem would complete officer courses in England.

== Career in the Navy ==
In 1956, during the Suez Crisis, Telem served as head of branch operations of the Navy, and shortly after the war, in 1957, was appointed commander of the destroyer Yaffo, a position he held for two years.

Telem also took part in the Six-Day War, the Cherbourg Project, and the War of Attrition as a Navy officer. In 1972 he was promoted in rank to Major General and elevated to Commander of the Navy.

=== Yom Kippur War ===
Telem's skill as Commander was quickly tested by the 1973 Yom Kippur War. Contrary to the opinion of others in the IDF intelligence, Telem insisted on preparing for the war, the outbreak of which came as a surprise to most in the Israeli establishment. Although the war as a whole did not result in outright victory for either side, the Israeli Navy did not lose a single ship (while sinking multiple enemy ships) and only suffered three casualties.

== After the Navy ==
Telem retired from the Navy in 1976. Then-Defense Minister Shimon Peres appointed Telem special assistant to the ambassador to South Africa, where he conducted several weapons deals.

In 1979, he left government service, and served as CEO of Israel Military Industries from 1980 until his retirement in 1991.

Telem died on 16 June 2008. An autobiography, "תלם בים" (A Trail ("Telem") at Sea), was published posthumously.
