= Komar-class missile boat =

1957 Soviet small missile boat class

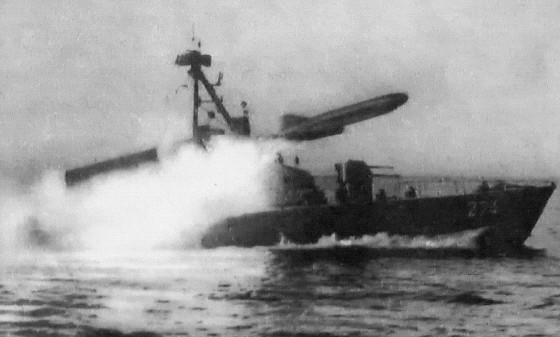
- A Komar-class missile boat launching a Styx missile

Class overview
- Name: Komar (Project 183R)
- Operators: Soviet Navy; Algerian National Navy; Cuban Revolutionary Navy; Egyptian Navy; Indonesian Navy; Iraqi Navy; Myanmar Navy; Korean People's Navy; People's Liberation Army Navy; Syrian Navy; Vietnam People's Navy
- Succeeded by: Osa class
- Subclasses: Project 183 (MTB)
- Built: 1952-1960
- In commission: 1952-2002
- Completed: 112 missile boats

General characteristics
- Type: Missile boat
- Displacement: 61.5 tons standard, 66.5 tons full load
- Length: 25.4 m (83 ft 4 in)
- Beam: 6.24 m (20 ft 6 in)
- Draught: 1.24 m (4 ft 1 in) (Note: Other sources have the draught being 2 m (6 ft 7 in))
- Propulsion: 4 shaft M-50F diesels 4,800 hp (3,600 kW)
- Speed: 44 knots (81 km/h; 51 mph)
- Range: 600 nmi (1,100 km; 690 mi) at 32 knots (59 km/h; 37 mph)
- Crew: 17 (3 officers)
- Sensors & processing systems: MR-331 Rangout radar; Nikhrom IFF
- Armament: 2 × 25 mm 2M-3M guns in a twin gun mount (1,000 rounds); 2 × KT-67 missile launchers containing 1 P-15 Termit (SS-N-2 "Styx") anti-ship missile each

The Soviet Project 183R class, more commonly known as the Komar class, its NATO reporting name, meaning "mosquito", is a class of missile boats, the first of its kind, built in the 1950s and 1960s. Notably, they were the first to sink another ship with anti-ship missiles in 1967.

== Export ships ==
- Algerian National Navy - 6 boats 1967
- People's Liberation Army Navy - 8 boats (1961) plus about 40 built under licence. The Chinese also built a steel-hulled derivative as the Type 024 class missile boat
- Cuban Revolutionary Navy - 18 boats
- Egyptian Navy - 7 boats (1962–67), retired in the early 1990s; The Egyptian Navy built 6 derivative boats equipped with western weapons and electronics in the early 1980s as the October class
- Indonesian Navy - 12 boats (1961–65)
- Iraqi Navy - 3 boats (1972)
- Myanmar Navy - 6 boats donated between 1969 and 1974, all retired between 1998 and 2002.
- Korean People's Navy - 10 boats
- Syrian Navy - 9 boats
- Vietnam People's Navy - 4 boats

== Combat use ==
- 1967 October 21 - Egyptian Navy Komar-class missile boats sank Israeli destroyer Eilat in the first combat use of P-15 Termit anti-ship missiles. This was the first time a ship had sunk another ship using guided missiles.
- 7 October 1973 - Two Syrian Navy Komar-class missile boats along with an Osa I-class missile boat, a K-123 torpedo boat and a T43-class minesweeper fought unsuccessfully against four Israeli Navy Sa'ar 3-class missile boats and one Sa'ar 4-class missile boat in the Battle of Latakia. Other Syrian missile boats fired missiles from within the harbor that mistakenly or due to malfunction hit civilian craft in the harbour.
- 1974 January 19 - 4 People's Liberation Army Navy Komar-class joined Battle of the Paracel Islands in Vietnam War

== See also ==
- List of ships of the Soviet Navy
- List of ships of Russia by project number
