= Osa-class missile boat =

1960s Soviet missile boat super-class

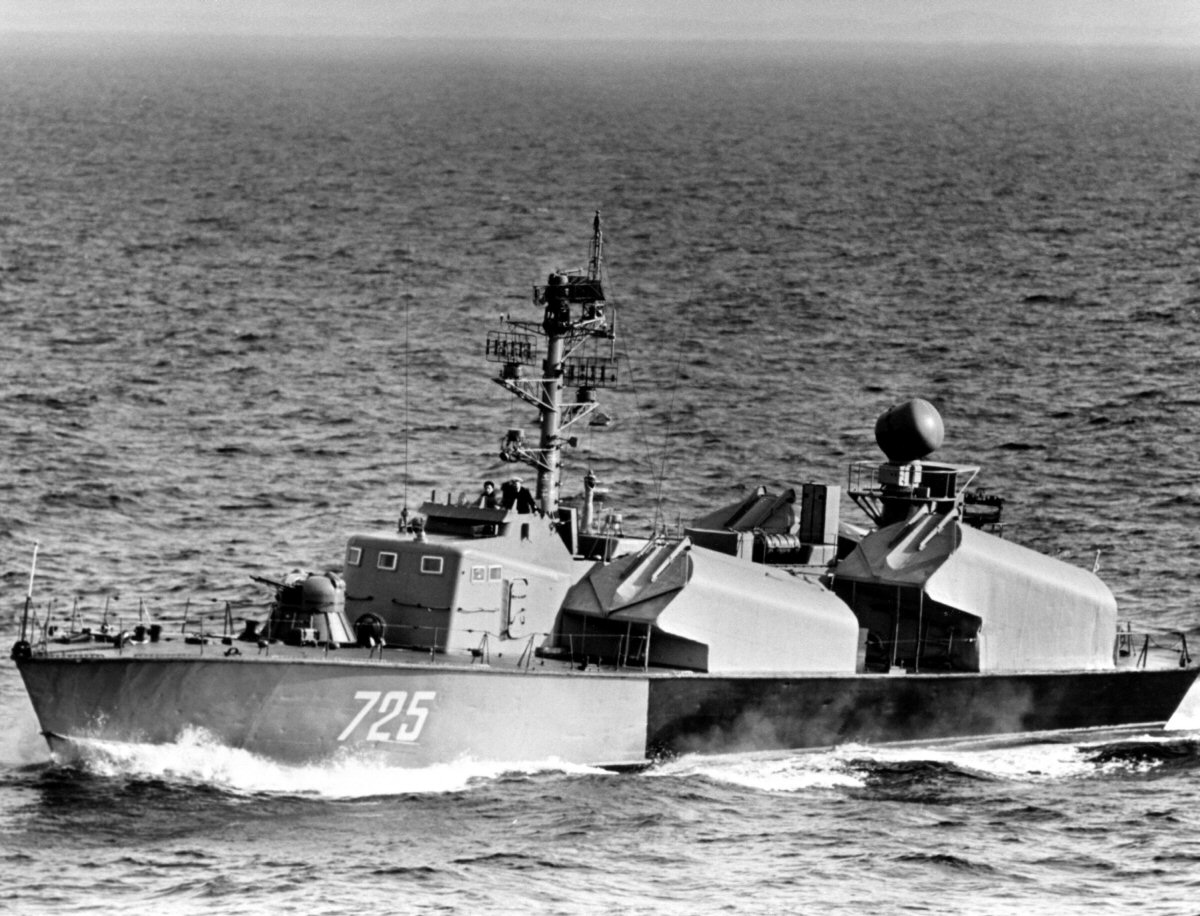
- Osa 1 (Project 205) craft

Class overview
- Name: Osa class
- Builders: Vostochnaya Verf
- Operators: see below
- Preceded by: Komar-class missile boat
- Succeeded by: Tarantul-class corvette
- Subclasses: Osa 1, Osa 2
- Built: 1960–1973
- In service: 1960–present
- Completed: 400+

General characteristics
- Type: Missile boat
- Displacement: Osa 1; 171.5 (with M-504B – 184) tons standard; 209 (with M-504B – 226) tons full load; Osa 2; 192 tons standard; 235 tons full load
- Length: 38.6 m (127 ft)
- Beam: 7.64 m (25.1 ft)
- Draught: 1.73 m (5.7 ft) (with M-504B – 1.84 m (6.0 ft))
- Installed power: 3 × 4,000 hp (3.0 MW) M-503G diesel engines (205); 3 × 5,000 hp (3.7 MW) M-504B diesel engines (205U onwards)
- Propulsion: 3 shafts
- Speed: 38.5 knots (71.3 km/h) (M-503G); 42 knots (78 km/h) (M-504B)
- Range: 1,800 nmi (3,300 km) at 14 knots (26 km/h), 800 nmi (1,500 km) at 30 knots (56 km/h), 500 nmi (930 km) at 35 knots (65 km/h)
- Endurance: 5 days
- Complement: 28 (4 officers) (Osa 1); 29 (4 officers) (Osa 2)
- Sensors & processing systems: MR-331 Rangout (Square Tie) radar; Klyon fire-control system for P-15 Termit; Nickel IFF; MR-104 Rys (Drum Tilt) fire-control radar for AK-230; ARP-58SV radio direction finder
- Electronic warfare & decoys: Nikhrom-RRM IFF/ESM
- Armament: 2 × AK-230 twin 30 mm CIWS (2,000 rounds); 4 × P-15 Termit (SS-N-2 Styx) anti-ship missiles

The Project 205 Moskit (mosquito) more commonly known by their NATO reporting name Osa, are a class of missile boats developed for the Soviet Navy in the late 1950s. Until 1962 this was classified as a large torpedo boat.

The Osa class is probably the most numerous class of missile boats ever built, with over 400 vessels constructed between 1960 and 1973 for both the Soviet Navy and for export to allied countries. Osa means wasp in Russian, but it is not an official name. The boats were designated as "large missile cutters" in the Soviet Navy.

== Origins ==
While the earlier Komar class were cheap and efficient boats (and the first to sink a warship with guided missiles, destroying the Israeli Navy's Eilat), their endurance, sea keeping, and habitability were modest at best, and the missile box was vulnerable to damage from waves. Among their other weak points were the wooden hull, the radar set lacking a fire control unit, and an inadequate defensive armament consisting of two manually operated 25 mm guns with only a simple optical sight in a single turret.

The Komars' offensive weapons were a set of two P-15 Termit (NATO: SS-N-2 "Styx") missiles, and there was insufficient capacity to hold the more modern longer-ranged P-15Ms. The sensors were not effective enough to use the maximum range of the missiles, and the crew of 17 was not large enough to employ all the systems efficiently.

In order to remedy all these shortcomings, it was felt that bigger boats were needed to mount the necessary equipment and to provide more space for a larger crew.

== Project ==
The Project 205 boats are bigger than the pioneering Project 183R (NATO: Komar class) boats, with a mass four times greater, and nearly double the crew. They were still meant to be 'minimal' ships for the planned tasks.

The hull was made of steel, with a low and wide superstructure made of lighter AMG alloys, continuous deck, and a high free-board. The edges of the deck were rounded and smooth to ease washing off radioactive contamination in case of nuclear war. The hull was quite wide, but the Project 205 boats could still achieve high speeds as they had three Zvezda M503 radial diesel engines capable of a combined 12,000 hp (15,000 hp on Project 205U onward) driving three shafts.

The powerful engines allowed a maximum speed of about 40 knots together with reasonable endurance and reliability. There were also three diesel generators. Two main engines and one generator were placed in the forward engine room, the third main engine and two generators in the aft engine room. There was a control compartment between the two engine rooms.

The problem related to the weak anti-aircraft weaponry of the earlier Project 183R was partially solved with the use of two AK-230 turrets, in the fore and aft deck. An MR-104 Rys (NATO: "Drum Tilt") fire-control radar was placed in a high platform, and controlled the whole horizon, despite the superstructures that were quite wide but low. Even if placed in the aft, this radar had a good field of view all around.

The AK-230 turrets were unmanned, each armed with two 30 mm guns capable of firing 2,000 rpm (400 practical) with a 2,500 m practical range. Use against surface targets was possible, but as with the previous Komar ships, once all missiles were expended it was planned to escape and not fight. Truly effective anti-surface gun weaponry was not available until the introduction of the Project 12341.1 Molniya (NATO: "Tarantul") class corvettes, with 76 mm guns.

The offensive armament consisted of four P-15 Termit (NATO: SS-N-2 "Styx") missiles, each protected from bad weather conditions inside an enclosing box-shaped launcher. This doubled the available weapons compared to the Project 183R, giving greater endurance. The missiles were controlled by a MR-331 Rangout (NATO: "Top Bow") radar and a Nikhrom-RRM (NATO: "Square Tie") ESM/IFF that even allowed targeting over the horizon, if the target's radar was turned on.

With all these improvements, these ships were considerably more effective. They had one of the first, if not the first close-in weapon systems (CIWS). The survivability rating was improved to 50%, and the required volley of 12 missiles could be launched by only three ships. Sinking a destroyer was therefore regarded as 'assured' using only six ships (two squadrons of three vessels), making the Project 205 vessels easier to coordinate and even cheaper than would be the required number of Project 183R boats to achieve the same effectiveness.

As a result of these improvements, Project 205 boats were without equal in the late 1950/early 1960s. Over 400 were made in USSR, and another 120 in China. Some of the improved Project 205U (Osa 2) were equipped with the 9K32 Strela-2 (NATO: SA-N-5 "Grail") surface-to-air missiles in MTU-4 quadruple launchers in an attempt to improve air defence. This new model also had improved, more powerful engines, and new cylindrical missile boxes, with the improved P-15U missiles. The later 205M and 205 mod boats had longer tubes for the further-improved P-15M missiles.

== Variants ==
The Project 205's hull proved to be very versatile and were used as the basis for a whole series of Soviet fast attack craft and patrol boats.

- Project 205 ("Osa 1"): Original missile boat, recognisable by the box-shaped missile launchers for the P-15/P-15T Termit missiles. 160 built.
- Project 205E: Project 205 with 4 KT-62K missile launchers for P-25 missiles and a forward hydroplane, making it capable of reaching up to 50 kn (93 km/h). 1 built.
- Project 205Ch: Project 205 with electric equipment on 400 Hz. 1 built.
- Project 205U ("Osa 2"): Upgraded Project 205 with tube-shaped missile launchers for the improved P-15U missile. 32 built.
- Project 205ER: Main export version of the Project 205U. Nikhrom-RRM IFF/ESM, Nickel IFF, and ARP-58SV radio direction finder removed.
- Project 205M: Longer missile tubes for P-15M missiles with new Graviy radar complex instead of Rangout/Rys complex. 1 built.
- Project 205mod: P-15M missile instead of P-15U. 19 built.
- Project 205P Tarantul ("Stenka"): Anti-submarine patrol boat version.

In addition to the above, the Project 206 family of fast attack craft (NATO: Shershen, Turya, and Matka class) are based on the Project 205 and share a common engine room design.

== Combat service ==
These missile boats saw action during the War of Attrition, Yom Kippur War, and Indo-Pakistani War of 1971.

The Israeli Saar missile-boats sank a Syrian Osa class missile-boat during the Battle of Latakia in 1973 and three Egyptian Osa class missile-boats in the Battle of Baltim. No Israeli ships were damaged in these battles.

In contrast, the Indian Navy Osa missile-boats were very successful in 1971 against the Pakistani Navy in Operation Trident, with a total of five ships sunk, two damaged beyond repair, an oil facility destroyed and Karachi Port held under blockade for no losses. During Operation Python, Indian Missile boats also struck the key port facilities at Karachi.

Osas were also used in the Iran–Iraq War, with a few losses, especially in a single battle in 1980 when several were destroyed by F-4s with AGM-65s. This battle occurred on 29 November 1980 and the Iraqi Navy incurred some damage. Iraq lost only five missile boats during the eight years of war. During the Gulf War, most of the Iraqi Navy was sunk or disabled by Coalition airstrikes, while one Osa-class boat managed to escape to Iran. According to Sharpe, the remaining Osas in Iraqi service were decommissioned by February 1991.

Syrian Osa 2's were used in the Syrian Civil War. Osa 2s were filmed firing their deck guns into the city of Latakia in August 2011. On December 10, 2024, several were sunk by the Israeli Air Force during the destruction of the Syrian Navy.

The shortcomings that the export Osas had were mainly the low efficiency of their missiles against small and ECM-equipped targets, as seen in the Battle of Latakia. In this conflict, Osas and Komars fired first, thanks to the longer range of missiles and favourable radar propagation conditions, but missed the targets due to jamming, and were not capable of escaping due to some engine malfunctions. The lack of medium caliber gun hampered defence against gunboats, even though the USSR had 37, 45 and 57 mm guns capable of being fitted in place of one 30 mm gun, as happened in some other vessels, such as the Poti ASW corvettes. Effective anti-missile systems were never equipped even though there was no significant size or weight difference between the AK-230 and the AK-630 CIWS.

The successor project was the Project 1241 Tarantul class corvette, with twice the displacement and a higher cost, but still initially armed with only four P-15s. They finally had a better electronic suite and a 76 mm gun with high rate of fire, along with newer P-270 Moskit and Kh-35 supersonic missiles, AK-630 CIWS, and 'Bass Tilt' radars. Fewer were built however, and so the Osas, after replacing the old Komars, remained widely in service up to the turn of the 21st century.

== Operators ==
Approximately 175 Osa 1 and 114 Osa 2 boats were built for the Soviet Navy, the last were decommissioned in about 1990 in the main Soviet fleet. Amongst the post-Soviet countries, one boat remained in service with the Azerbaijan Navy and two with service with the Latvian Navy.

=== Osa 1 ===
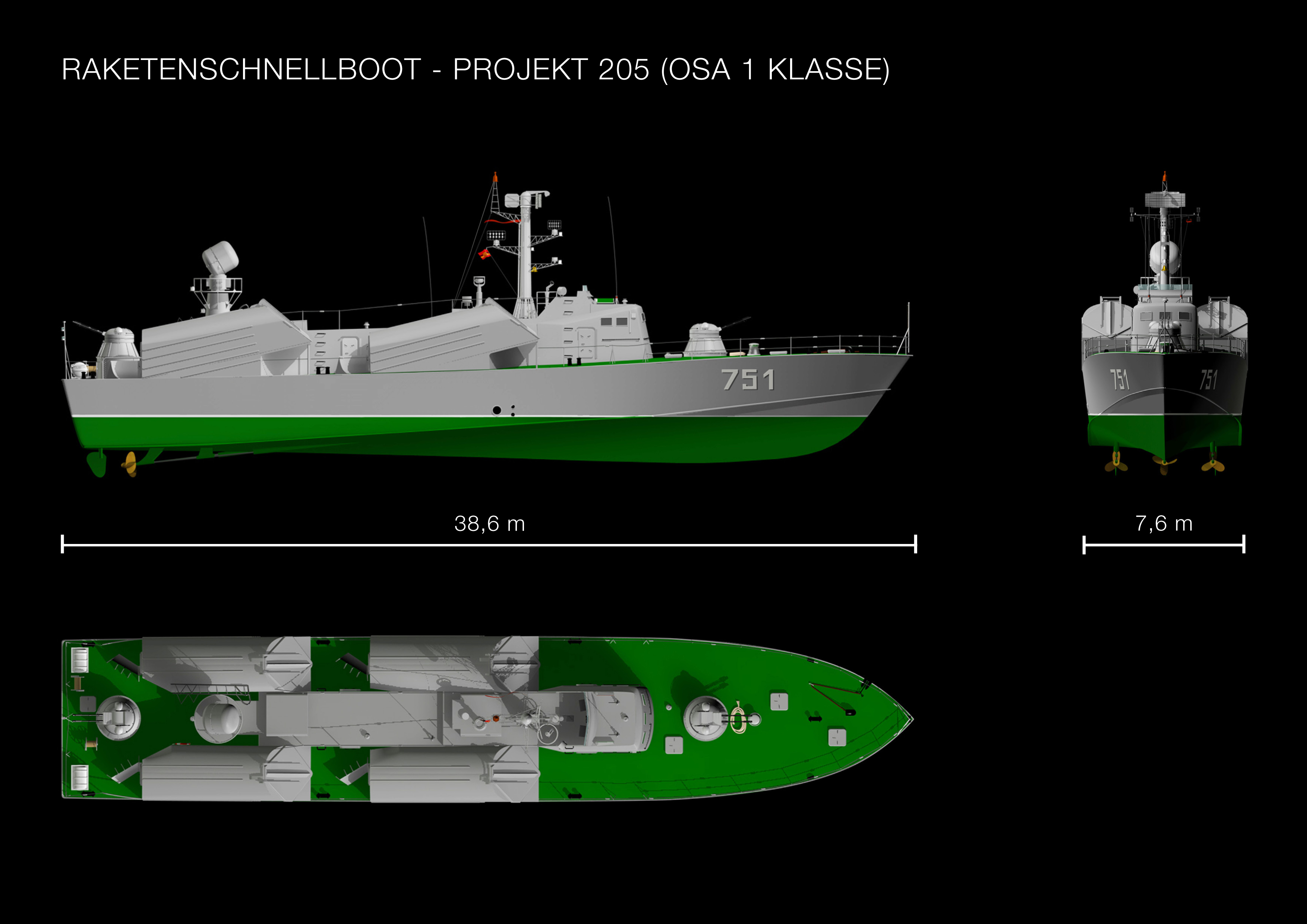
Osa 1 (Project 205) craft in Volksmarine colours, cross sections.

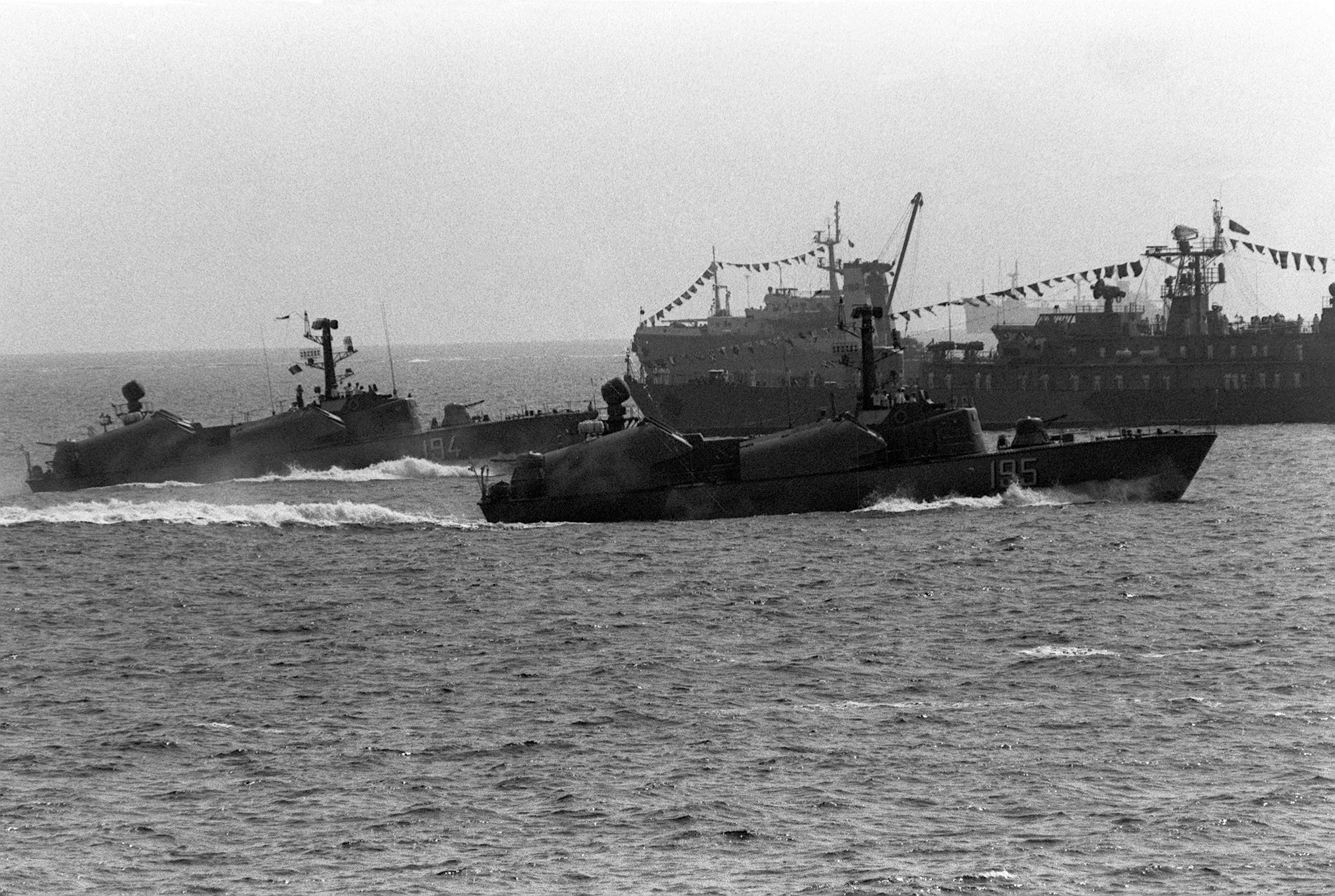
Romanian Osa 1 (Project 205) missile boats, 1992

Bangladesh
Bangladesh Navy – 5 boats, all decommissioned.
China
People's Liberation Army Navy – 4 boats in early 1960s plus over 130 license-produced.
Cuba
Cuban Revolutionary Navy− 6 boats transferred to Cuba between 1972 and 1976. One was decommissioned in 1981, while the remaining boats were scrapped by 1999
Egypt
Egyptian Navy – 3 boats (plus two in reserve) remain as of 2007 from 13 transferred from the Soviet Union in 1966–68, some of which were sunk during the Yom Kippur War in 1973. The survivors were re-engined in 1994 and given Litton Triton radar intercept systems. 5 ex-Yugoslav boats were bought in 2004 for less than $1m a piece, refitted in Montenegro and delivered in 2007.
East Germany
Volksmarine – 15 boats transferred 1962–1971 – decommissioned 1981–1990
India
Indian Navy – 9 boats transferred 1968-1971. Known as Vidyut-class missile boats. Decommissioned 1983–1997.
Iraq
Iraqi Navy − 2 boats, all lost after the Gulf War in 1991
Latvia
Latvian Naval Forces – 5 ex-East German boats: two were refitted and modernized as the Ziben-class while the others were cannibalized for spare parts. decommissioned in 2001
North Korea
Korean People's Navy – 12 boats transferred 1968–1973
Poland
Polish Navy – 13 boats transferred 1964–1975 – decommissioned 1984–2006
Romania
Romanian Naval Forces – 6 boats in service 1964–2004
Serbia and Montenegro
Yugoslav War Navy − 5 boats in 1996. Passed on to Montenegro after breakup in 2006.
Soviet Union
Soviet Navy – 22 boats in 1991. Passed on to successor states
Syria
Syrian Navy – 8 boats received in 1966, all decommissioned.
Yugoslavia
Yugoslav Navy – 10 boats in 1991. Two were captured by Croatia and four were cannibalized for spare parts by 1996

Croatia
Croatian Navy – One was decommissioned in 1994. None in service by 2004
Montenegro
Montenegrin Navy – All boats were sold to Egypt

=== Osa 2 ===
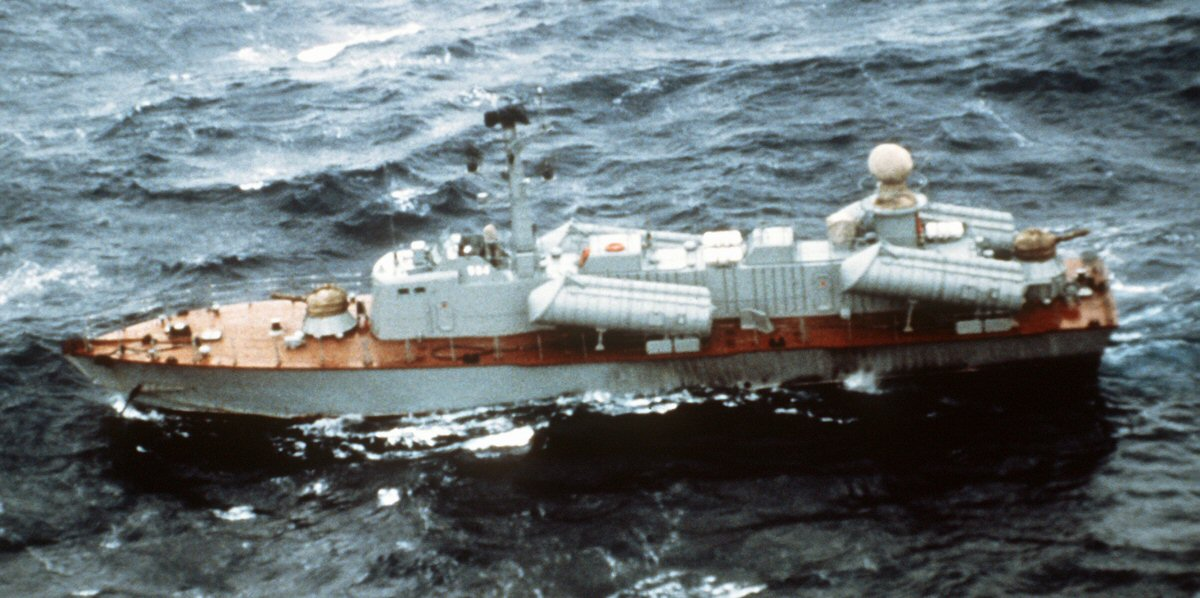
Osa 2 (Project 205U) craft, 1982

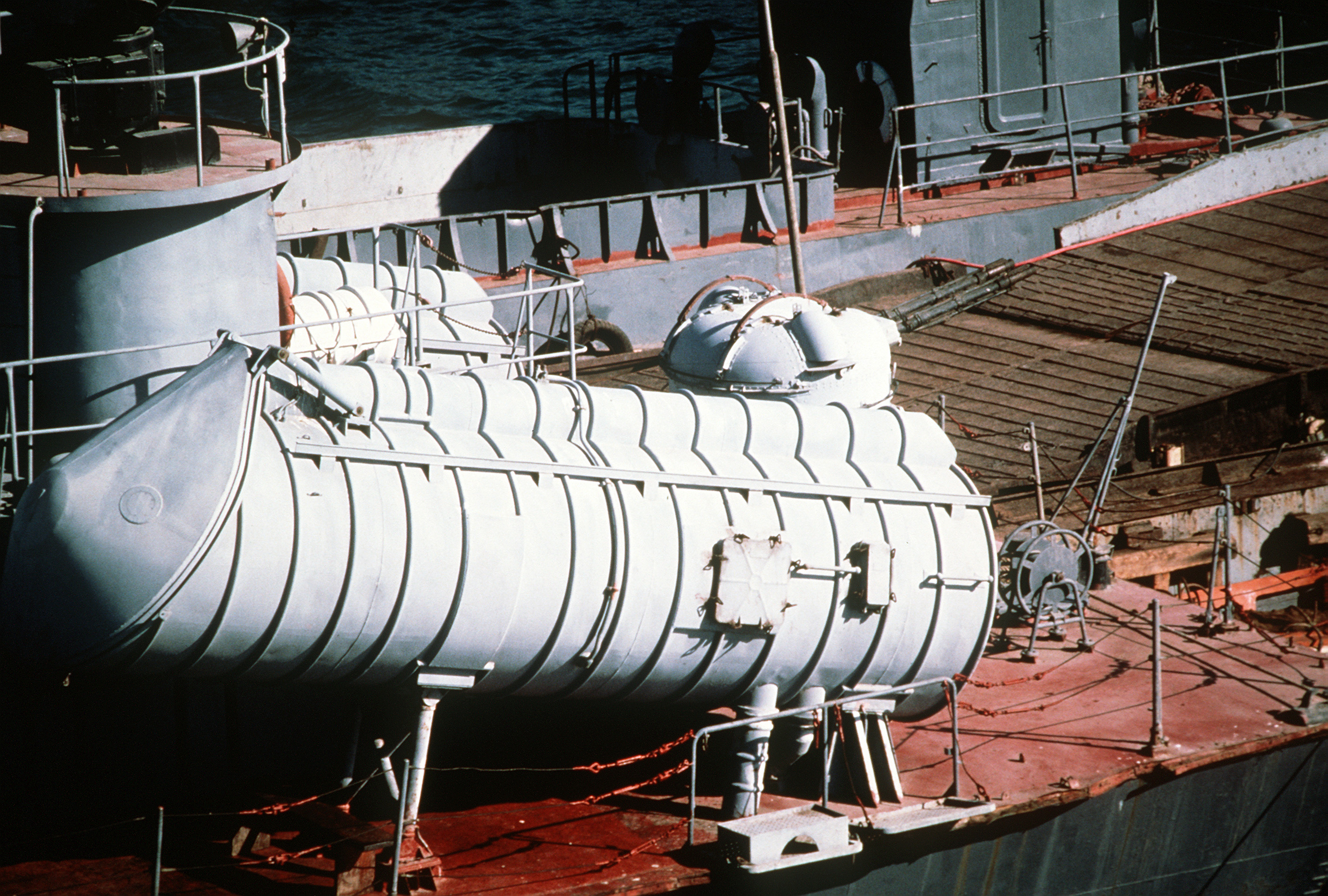
P-15M launcher on an Osa 2 class fast attack craft, 1981

Algeria
Algerian National Navy – 8 boats transferred 1978
Angola
Angolan Navy – 6 boats transferred 1982–1983, According to Sharpe, they were "in various stages of terminal decay" by 1996
Azerbaijan
Azerbaijani Navy – 1 boat
Bulgaria
Bulgarian Navy – 3 boats (all decommissioned starting in 2008)
Cuba
Cuban Revolutionary Navy – 13 boats in 1991
Egypt
Egyptian Navy – 4 boats (See note from Finland's Tuima class missile boat)
Ethiopia
Ethiopian Navy − 4 boats transferred from the Soviet Navy between 1978 and 1981. By 1996, only two were based at Djibouti while the rest were sunk or scuttled
Eritrea
Eritrean Navy – 5 boats
Finland
Finnish Navy – 4 boats transferred 1974–75. Known as Tuima class missile boats. Decommissioned in 2003 and sold to Egyptian Navy, to be used as minelaying boats after being retrofitted.
India
Indian Navy – 8 boats transferred 1976–77. Known as Chamak-class missile boats. decommissioned 1999–2003
Iraq
Iraqi Navy – 5 boats prior to the Gulf War. All lost by 1991
Libya
Libyan Navy – 4 boats in 2011
Libya
National Liberation Army – Unknown
Russia
Russian Navy – Passed on from Soviet Navy
Somalia
Somali Navy – 2 boats in 1991
Soviet Union
Soviet Navy – 24 boats in 1991. Passed on to successor states
Syria
Syrian Navy − 10 boats received between 1978 and 1984. At least six were destroyed by Israeli airstrikes following the Fall of the Assad regime
Vietnam
Vietnam People's Navy – 8 boats
Yemen
Yemeni Navy – 8 boats, currently out of commission

== See also ==
- List of ships of the Soviet Navy
- List of ships of Russia by project number
