= Sa'ar 3-class missile boat =

Missile boats built in Cherbourg, France for the Israeli navy

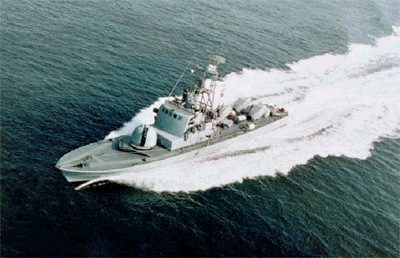
- A Sa'ar 3-class missile boat underway

Class overview
- Name: Sa'ar 3
- Builders: Constructions Mécaniques de Normandie
- Operators: Israeli Navy; Chilean Navy
- Preceded by: Sa'ar 2 class
- Succeeded by: Sa'ar 4 class
- In commission: 1969–1991
- Completed: 6

General characteristics
- Type: Missile boat
- Displacement: 220 tons; 250 tons loaded
- Length: 45 m (148 ft)
- Beam: 7.62 m (25.0 ft)
- Draft: 1.8 m (5.9 ft)
- Propulsion: 4 MTU 16V 538 diesel engines; 4 shafts, total of 12,800 hp (9,500 kW)
- Speed: 40 knots (74 km/h)
- Range: 2,500 nmi (4,600 km) at 15 kn (28 km/h); 1,000 nmi (1,900 km) at 30 kn (56 km/h)
- Complement: 40
- Sensors & processing systems: Thomson-CSF Neptune THD 1040 air & surface surveillance radar; Selenia Orion RTN-10X fire-control radar
- Armament: 4 × RGM-84 Harpoon SSMs; and; 3 × Gabriel II SSMs; or; 6 × Gabriel II SSMs; 1 × OTO Melara 76 mm naval gun; 2 × 0.30 in (7.62 mm) caliber M1919A4 Browning machine guns; 4 × 7.62 mm FN MAG 58 general-purpose machine guns

The Sa'ar 3 class ("Cherbourg") is a series of missile boats built in Cherbourg, France at the Amiot Shipyard based on an Israeli Navy modification of the German Navy's Jaguar-class fast attack craft. They are also known as the stars of Cherbourg.

== Design and development ==
The Israeli naval command had reached the conclusion by the early 1960s that their old Second World War-era destroyers, frigates and corvettes were obsolete and new ships and vessels were needed. Yitzhak Shoshan, later to command the destroyer INS Eilat at the time of her sinking, surveyed the available torpedo boat designs and recommended the German Jaguar class. The Israeli Navy asked Lürssen, the shipyard which built the Jaguar class, to modify the wooden Jaguar-class design by switching to steel construction, adding 2.4 metres (7 ft 10 in) to the length, and revising the internal compartmentalization. Due to Arab League pressure on the German government, this plan was not continued and a new builder was sought. The Israeli Navy discovered that the Cherbourg-based Constructions Mécaniques de Normandie owned by Félix Amiot had experience building patrol boats in cooperation with Lürssen and would build the boats, based upon the German designs and plans. The engines were imported from Germany. The project received the code name "Falling Leaves" (Hebrew: שלכת). After the last 5 built were placed under embargo by the government of France, they were retrieved in the Cherbourg Project.

== Operational history ==
The Sa'ar 3 boats' first battle engagements were made during the October 1973 Yom Kippur War. During this war, the first surface-to-surface missile naval engagements took place. The first was at the Battle of Latakia where the Israeli Navy defeated many Syrian boats and coastal targets using Otobreda 76 mm guns and missiles. This was followed shortly thereafter by Israeli defeat of Egyptian forces at the Battle of Baltim.

In the 1980s, one of the Sa'ar boats got stuck in the Coastal waters of Saudi Arabia. Saudi Arabian authorities allowed the Israeli navy to free the ship and to take it away.

== Vessels in the class ==
- INS Sa'ar (Tempest)
- INS Sufa (Storm)
- INS Ga'ash (Volcanic Storm)
- INS Herev (Sword)
- INS Hanit (Spear) - sold to Chile in 1988, renamed Iquique
- INS Hetz (Arrow) - sold to Chile in 1988, renamed Covadonga

== See also ==
- Cherbourg Project
