= Missile boat =

Small warship armed with anti-ship missiles

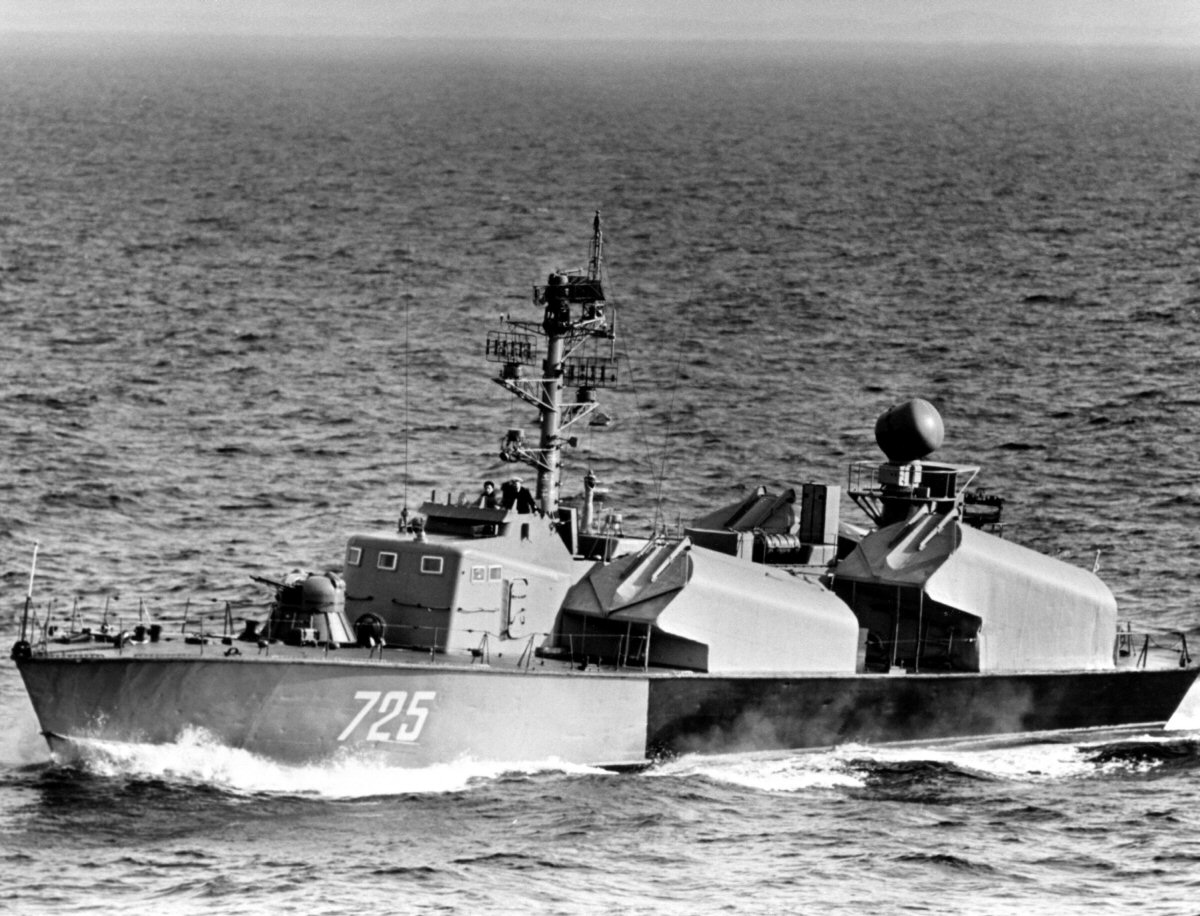
An Osa I class missile boat in 1983. The Osa class are probably the most numerous class of missile boats to have been built.

Wave-piercing catamaran design of the People's Liberation Army Navy Type 22 missile boat armed with 8 YJ-83 anti-ship missiles

A missile boat or missile cutter is a small, fast warship armed with anti-ship missiles. Being smaller than other warships such as destroyers and frigates, missile boats are popular with nations interested in forming a navy at lower cost. They are similar in concept to the torpedo boats of World War II; in fact, the first missile boats were modified torpedo boats with the torpedo tubes replaced by missile tubes.

The doctrine behind the use of missile boats is based on the principle of mobility over defence and firepower. The advent of proper guided missile and electronic countermeasure technologies gave birth to the idea that warships could now be designed to outmaneuver their enemies and conceal themselves while carrying powerful weapons.

Previously, increasing the potency of naval artillery required larger projectiles, which required larger and heavier guns, which in turn called for larger ships to carry these guns and their ammunition and absorb their recoil. This trend culminated in the giant battleships of World War II. Even as World War II was taking place, submarines and aircraft, particularly those launched from aircraft carriers, had made it clear that large warships were little more than targets in a major war. Guided bombs and then anti-ship missiles further reduced the usefulness of large warships outside the carriers.

Missile boats, when equipped with sophisticated anti-ship missiles, and especially when used in a swarm, can pose a significant threat to even the largest of capital ships, and do so at much greater ranges than is possible with torpedoes.

== Design and history ==
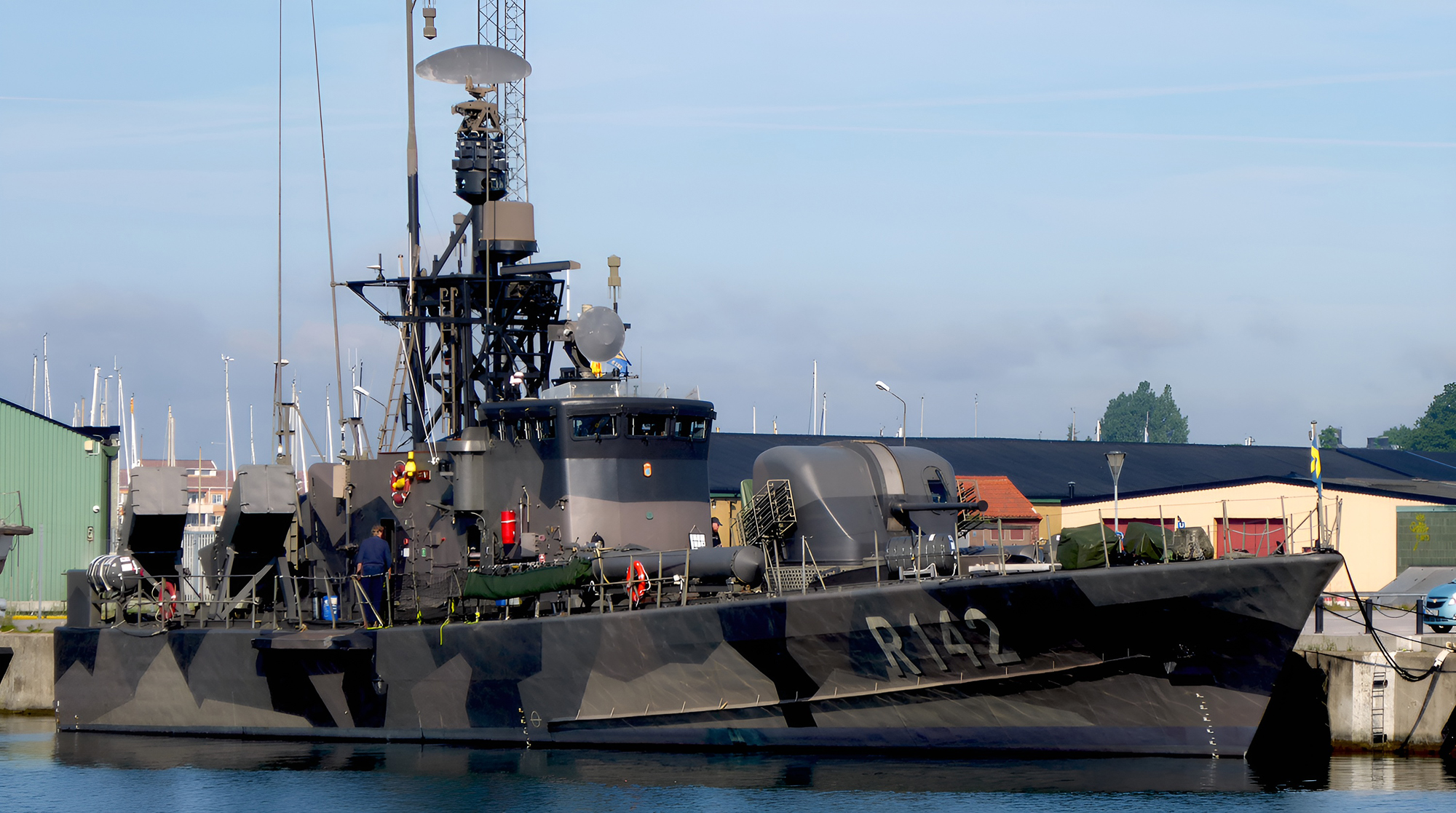
HSwMS Ystad of the Swedish Navy 2017.

Missile boats were invented and first manufactured by the Soviet Union in the 1950s, beginning with "Project 183R" which developed into the Komar-class missile boat, mounting two P-15 Termit (Styx) anti-ship missiles in box launchers and a twin 25mm autocannon on a 25-metre (82 ft) wooden hull displacing 66.5 tonnes (65.4 long tons; 73.3 short tons) Four diesel engines gave the Komars 4,800 bhp (3,600 kW) and a top speed of around 44 knots (81 km/h; 51 mph). Endurance was limited to 1,000 nautical miles (1,900 km; 1,200 mi) at 12 knots (22 km/h; 14 mph) and the vessels had fuel and supplies for only five days at sea. 112 Komar-class vessels were produced, while over 400 examples were built of the following Osa-class missile boat, with a significant number of both types being sold to pro-Soviet nations.

Being relatively small and constructed of wood, the Komar-class boats had a very small radar cross-section. Its sophisticated radar enabled the missile boat, with its low radar reflectivity, to detect a larger enemy ship before the latter was aware of its presence, fire its missiles and speed away.

Soviet naval architects had designed them with these characteristics to give the small boats this advantage against much larger American naval ships should they attempt to attack the Russian coast. The boats were designed for coastal operations, with limited endurance.

The first combat use of missile boats was by the Egyptian Navy operating Komar-class craft, which fired four Styx missiles (hitting with three) at the Israeli destroyer Eilat on October 21, 1967, shortly after the Six-Day War, sinking the Eilat with 47 dead and over a hundred wounded out of a crew of 199.

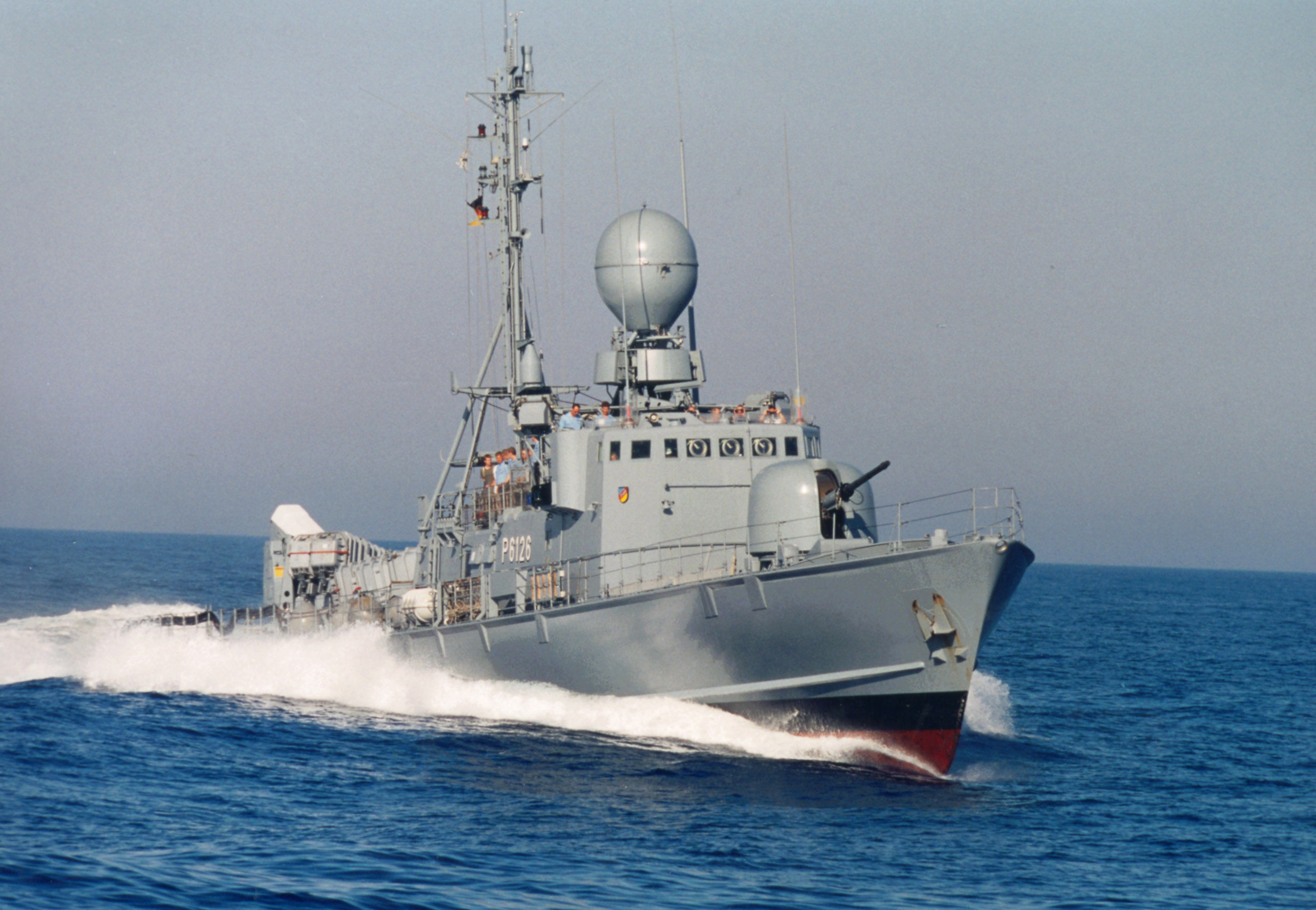
A Gepard-class vessel of the German Navy

The Soviet-built boats prompted a NATO response, which became more intense after the sinking of Eilat. The Germans and French worked together to produce their own missile boat, resulting in the La Combattante class. These were built on a 47-or-49-metre (154 or 161 ft) hull with 12,000 bhp (8,900 kW) of MTU diesel engines driving four shafts; a common weapon loadout would have four MM-38 Exocet missiles in two sets of two box launchers, in line and offset to the right and left with a 76 mm gun forward and 40 mm twin guns aft. Built until 1974, a total of 68 Combattante IIs were launched. The design was immediately followed by the Combattante III (1975 - 1990) which added 9 metres (30 ft) to hull length but kept the same armament (plus two twin 30mm autocannon), 43 of this type were produced. Several other countries produced their own versions of the Combattante, notably Israel with the Sa'ar 3 and the Sa'ar 4 variants.

During the Indo-Pakistani War of 1971, the Indian Navy's 25th Missile Boat Squadron, operating Vidyut-class missile boats, played a crucial role in the devastating Indian attacks on Karachi in December 1971. The two key operations in which these vessels played an active role were Operation Trident and Operation Python. Indian attacks destroyed half of the Pakistani Navy and most of Pakistan's naval fuel reserves in the port's fuel storage tanks which cleared the way for the decisive victory of the Indian Armed Forces.

The world's first naval battles between missile-armed warships occurred between Israeli Sa'ar 3-class and Sa'ar 4-class missile boats (using indigenously-developed Gabriel missiles), and Syrian Komar- and Osa-class missile boats during the October 1973 Yom Kippur War. The first of these engagements became known as the Battle of Latakia. During this and later battles, some fifty Gabriels and a similar number of Styx missiles were fired; seven Syrian ships were sunk, with zero Israeli losses.

At the Battle of Bubiyan in 1991 Iraqi missile boats were destroyed by British air-to-surface missiles.

Later designs, such as the German Gepard class and Finnish Hamina class are equipped with surface-to-air missiles and countermeasures.

The size of missile boats has increased, with some designs now at corvette size, 800 tonnes including a helicopter, giving them extended modes of operation. In April 1996 during Israel's Operation Grapes of Wrath, IDF naval forces used Sa'ar 4 and Sa'ar 4.5 boats to shell the Lebanese coast with 76 mm fire, in conjunction with artillery and air attacks.

== Current operations ==
Iran and North Korea have some of the largest numbers of missile boats in operation today. North Korea alone operates more than 300, while Iran has been developing "swarm boats" to be used as harassing vessels in the heavily contested littoral waters of the Persian Gulf. To counter the threat, the US Navy has been developing an ASUW Littoral Defensive Anti-Surface Warfare doctrine, along with vessels such as the littoral combat ship.

The People's Liberation Army Navy of China also has a large fleet of missile craft, which include Type 22 missile boats, Type 037IG Houxin-class missile boats and Type 037II Houjian-class missile boats, with a total of 109 units.

The Republic of China Navy based in Taiwan has also deployed the Kuang Hua VI-class missile boat to act as missile carriers in their fleet to counter big navies with naval version of "Shoot-and-scoot" technique along with their more than two hundred fishing ports. Originally, they plan to add so called Micro-class missile assault boat to their fleet under Admiral Lee Hsi-ming, yet the plan was halted due to budgetary issues.

== See also ==
- List of missile boat classes
- Fast attack craft
- Motor torpedo boat
- Motor gunboat
- Ballistic missile submarine (sometimes called a "missile boat")
