= Battle of Latakia =

1973 naval battle of the Yom Kippur War

Coordinates: 35.52105°N 35.726114°E

- Part of the Yom Kippur War
- Diagram outlining the Battle of Latakia
Date	7 October 1973
Location	near Latakia, Syria
Result	Israeli victory

Belligerents
Israel	Syria

Commanders and leaders
(Israel) Michael Barkai	Fadal Hussein

Strength
5 ships	5 ships

Casualties and losses
None	All vessels sunk Unknown casualties

The Battle of Latakia (Arabic: معركة اللاذقية; Hebrew: קרב לטקיה) was a small but revolutionary naval action of the Yom Kippur War, fought on 7 October 1973 between Israel and Syria. It was the first naval battle in history to see combat between surface-to-surface missile-equipped missile boats and the use of electronic deception.

== Background ==
At the outset of hostilities, the Israeli Navy set out to destroy the naval capabilities of the Syrians, who were equipped with Soviet Komar-class and Osa-class missile boats. The Syrian missile boats were equipped with Soviet manufactured P-15 Termit (NATO reporting name: SS-N-2 Styx) anti-ship missiles with twice the range of the Israeli Gabriel anti-ship missiles.

== Battle ==
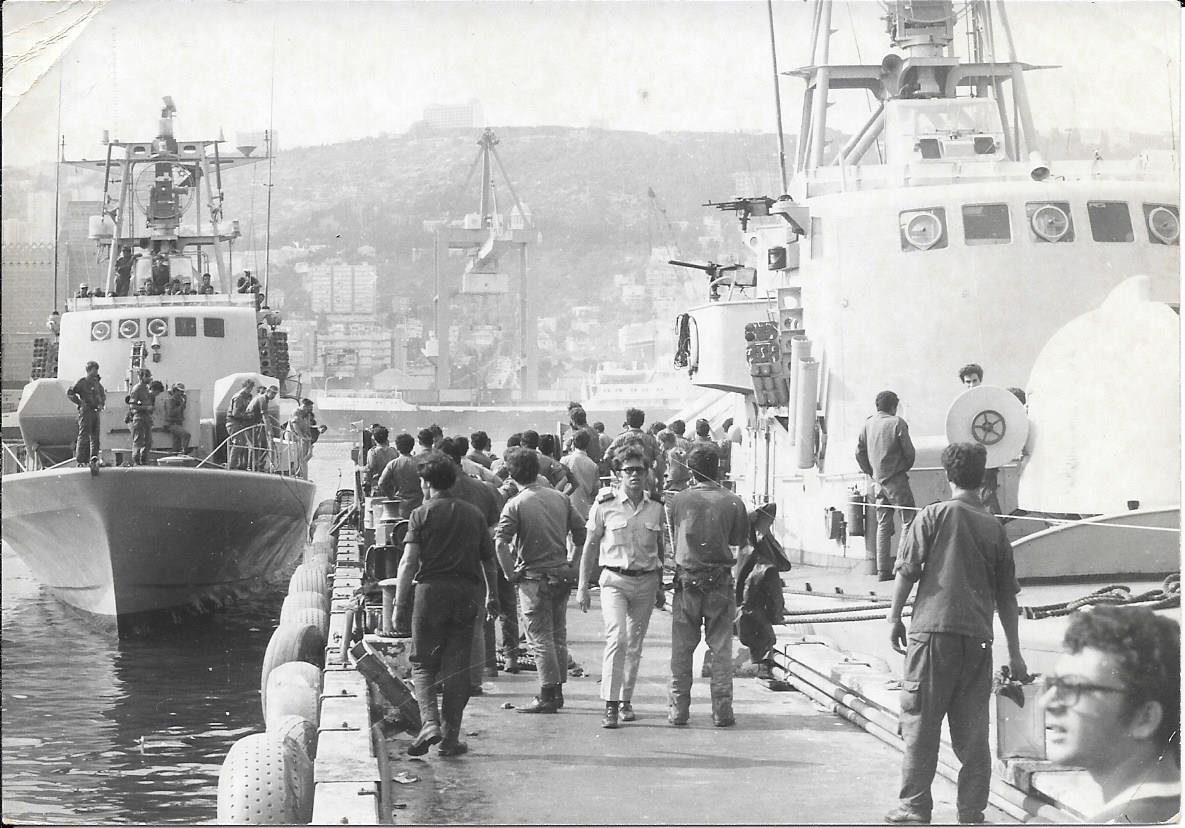
The Israeli missile boats return to their base in Haifa following the battle

At the beginning of the Yom Kippur War, the Israeli Navy carried out a raid against the Syrian port of Latakia. For this, the Israelis sent five missile boats and two landing ships with four helicopters. The helicopters had ESM, chaff, and mechanical–electronic echo enhancement equipment. The aim of the strike force was to carry out missile and gun attacks on the Syrian port. The helicopters were to be used for surface surveillance, EW, and gun spotting and as decoys.

The four Israeli Navy Sa'ar 3-class and one Sa'ar 4-class missile boats headed towards the Syrian port of Latakia in two parallel columns. In the western column were the missile boats Miznak (Blast), Ga'ash (Storm), and Hanit (Spear); the eastern column was composed of the missile boats Mivtach (Reliance) and Reshef (Spark).

The Israeli missile boats were detected by a patrolling Syrian torpedo boat and this detection was reported to the base. But before any reinforcements could be sent, at 22:28 hours the Israelis encountered the Syrian K-123 torpedo boat which was attacked using Gabriel SSMs and sunk by 76 mm gunfire from Mivtach and Hanit. As they headed toward the shore, the Israeli ships engaged a 560-ton Syrian T43-class minesweeper and also sank it, this time using four Gabriel anti-ship missiles. At 23:30, the Israelis made contact with two Syrian Komar-class and one Osa-class missile boats. The Israeli force turned East South Eastwards, and the helicopters climbed high so as to be detected by the shore radar at Latakia. In the meantime, three patrolling Syrian missile boats from off Bans were vectored northwest to attack the Israeli formation of seven radar contacts (three chaff clouds and four helicopters). At about 2330, the Syrians launched eight to twelve Styx missiles at the Israeli formation, which subsequently disappeared from the Syrian radar. The Syrian missile boats fired their Styx missiles at long range, but as the missiles approached, the Israelis employed electronic countermeasures and launched chaff rockets to successfully decoy the missiles. When the Israeli ships closed the range, they fired five Gabriel missiles, sinking one Komar and the Osa immediately and damaging the second Komar. The surviving Syrian Komar tried to escape, but it ran aground in shallow water and was destroyed by 76 mm cannon fire at 00:26 hours.

During this naval clash, other Syrian missile boats launched missiles from within the port limits of Latakia (actually launched while the missile boats were moored between merchant ships in port). However, these missiles malfunctioned or lost guidance, and two foreign (one Greek and one Japanese) merchant vessels anchored along the piers were hit. Both vessels were struck in the engine rooms.

The Syrian Navy remained bottled up in its home ports for the rest of the war.

While the Battle of Latakia was the first naval battle in history between missile boats, it was not the first incident in which a missile boat sank another ship using missiles. That had happened when two Egyptian Navy Komar-class missile boats sank the British-built Israeli destroyer Eilat on 21 October 1967, shortly after the Six-Day War, using four P-15 Termit surface-to-surface missiles.
