= List of missile boat classes =

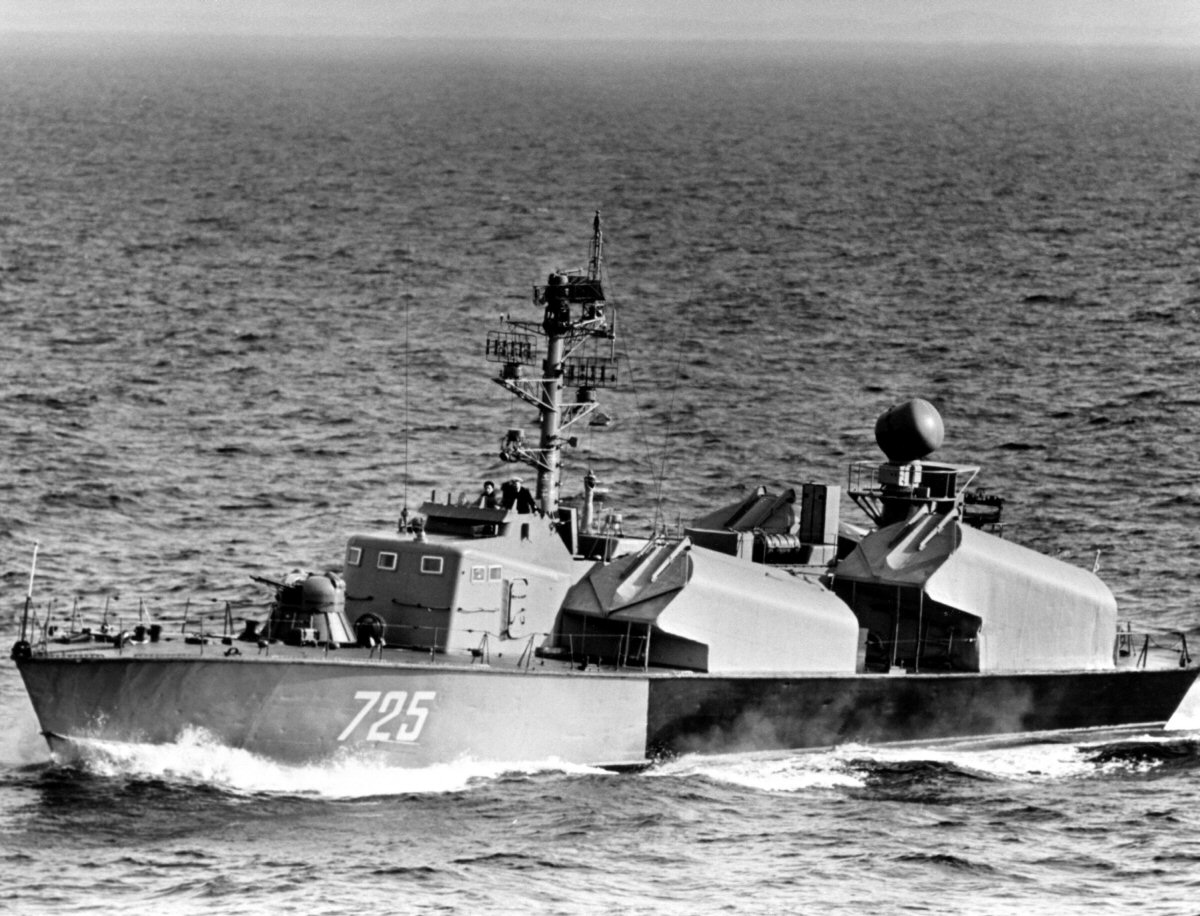
A Soviet Osa-I class missile boat. Being produced in large numbers and widely exported around the world, it saw combat in a number of naval engagements.

A list of classes of missile boats used by naval forces around the world.

== China ==
- Houbei class (Type 022), the first combat vessel with a catamaran hull.
- Type 037-II class
- Type 037-IG class

== Croatia ==
- Kralj class

== Egypt ==
- Ambassador MK III class
- Ramadan class
- October class

== Finland ==
- Tuima class - modified version of the Osa class
- Helsinki class
- Rauma class
- Hamina class

== France ==
- La Combattante II type fast attack craft - built for export
- La Combattante III class - built for export

== Germany ==
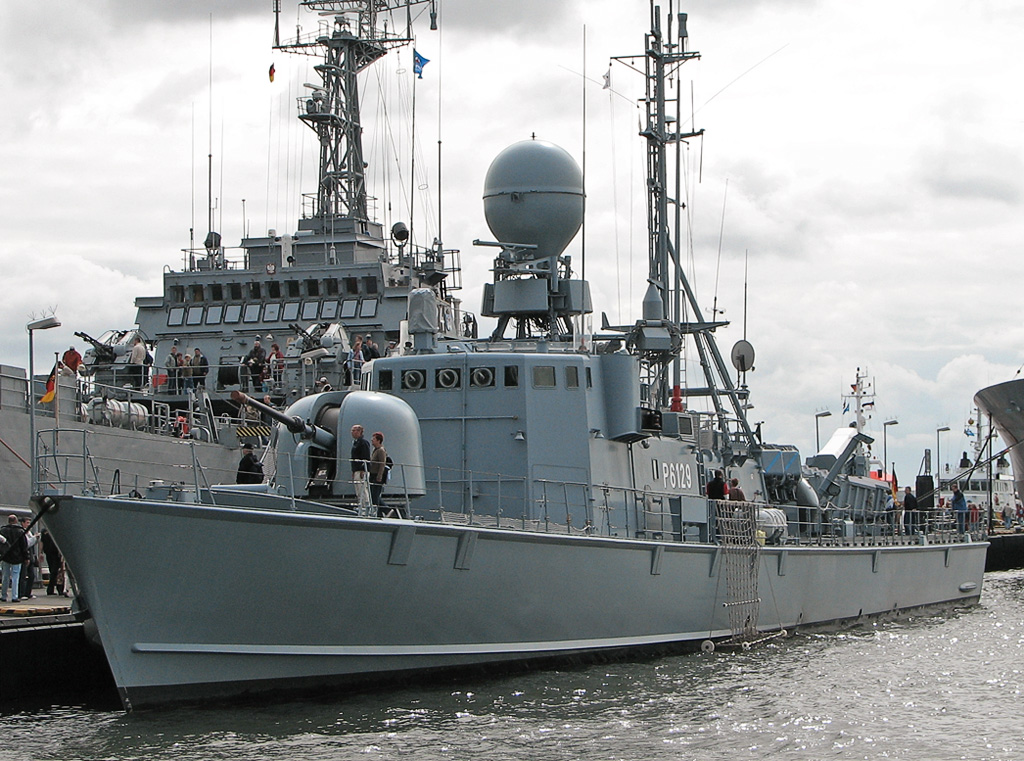
Wiesel a modern Gepard-class fast attack craft of the German Navy

- Tiger class - exported to Greece, Chile and Egypt
- Albatros class
- Gepard class

== Greece ==
- Roussen class (Super-Vita) - Used by the Hellenic Navy
- La Combattante IIIb class - Modified and upgraded version of the La Combattante IIIa class.
- La Combattante IIIa class - version of the French La Combattante III class.
- La Combattante IIa class - ex-German Tiger class

== India ==
- Next Generation Fast Attack Crafts (NGFACs)

== Indonesia ==
- Mandau class
- Clurit class
- Sampari class
- Klewang class

== Iran ==
- Thondar class
- Kaman class

== Israel ==
- Sa'ar 3-class missile boat
- Sa'ar 4-class missile boat used by Israel, with variants also in service in South Africa, Sri Lanka and a small number of other countries.
- Sa'ar 4.5-class missile boat used by Israel, with variants also in service in Mexico and Greece.

== Italy ==
- Sparviero class patrol boat class seven now decommissioned Hydrofoils

== Japan ==
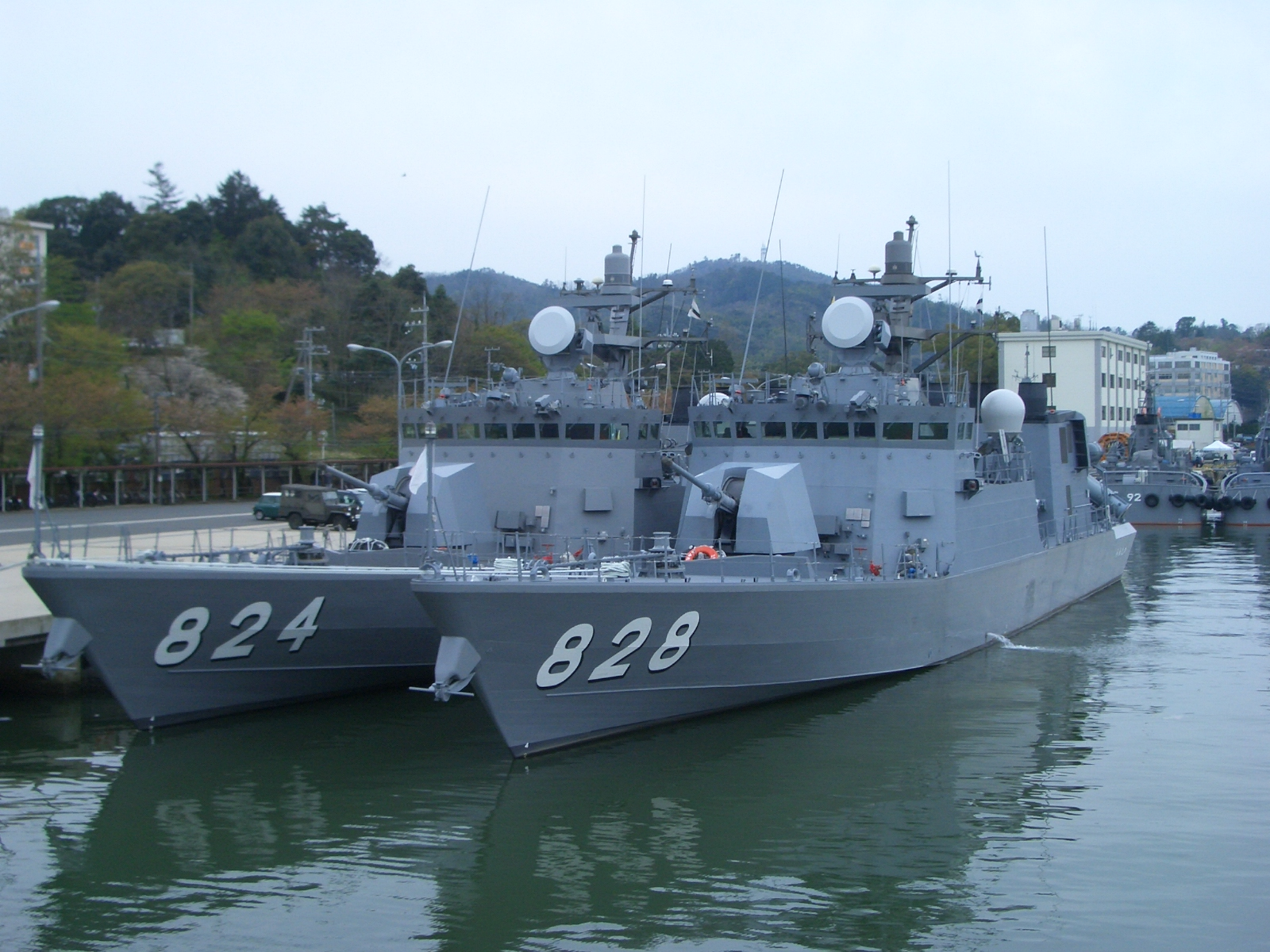
JMSDF Hayabusa-class missile boat

- 1-go class - based on Sparviero-class patrol boat
- Hayabusa class

== Korea, North ==
- Nongo class

== Korea, South ==
- Gumdoksuri class

== Malaysia ==
- Handalan class
- Perdana class

== Norway ==
- Skjold - used by Norway, a stealthy surface effect catamaran

== Pakistan ==
- Azmat class - based on Type 037II Houjian-class missile boat
- Jalalat II class
- Jurrat class(improved Jalalat II class)

== Philippines ==
- Multi-purpose Attack Craft Mk. 3
- Nestor Acero-class Fast Attack Interdiction Craft

== Russia/USSR ==
- Komar-class missile boat - The world's first missile boat, widely exported
- Osa-class missile boat - probably the world's numerous missile boat, widely exported
- Matka-class missile boat - hydrofoil missile boat
- Sarancha-class missile boat - hydrofoil missile boat
- Project 1239 hydrofoil missile boat

== Sweden ==
- Stockholm class
- Göteborg class
- Visby class

== Taiwan ==
- Kuang Hua VI-class missile boat - Indigenously developed for Taiwan's navy
- Hai Ou-class missile boat - based on Dvora-class
- Dvora-class fast patrol boat - Israeli design, armed with missiles by Taiwan

== Thailand ==
- Ratcharit - used by Thailand, a fast attack missile boat

== Turkey ==
- Kılıç - used by Turkey, a fast attack missile boat
- Rüzgar class fast attack craft
- Doğan class fast attack craft
- Kartal class

== United States ==
- Pegasus class, hydrofoils, all six now decommissioned

== Vietnam ==
- BPS-500 class missile boat

== Yugoslavia ==
- Končar class
- Kralj class (Note: The Kralj class was originally designed as a new class for the Yugoslav Navy, but by the time of the breakup SFR Yugoslavia in the early 1990s, only one boat was nearing completion. The unfinished boat was later completed and entered service with the Croatian Navy. A second, slightly modified boat was completed in 2001.)
