= Achimota-class fast attack craft =

Fast attack craft

Class overview
- Name: Achimota class
- Builders: Lürssen, West Germany
- Operators: Ghana Navy
- Built: 1979
- In service: 1981–present
- Completed: 2
- Active: 2

General characteristics
- Type: Fast attack craft
- Displacement: 395 t (389 long tons) (full load)
- Length: 58.1 m (190 ft 7 in)
- Beam: 7.6 m (24 ft 11 in)
- Draught: 2.8 m (9 ft 2 in)
- Propulsion: 3 x diesel engines; 8,500 kW (11,400 bhp)
- Speed: 30 knots (56 km/h; 35 mph)
- Range: 3,300 nmi (6,100 km; 3,800 mi) at 16 kn (30 km/h; 18 mph)
- Complement: 55
- Sensors & processing systems: Canopus A surface search radar; LIDD optronic director
- Armament: 1 × OTO Melara 76 mm (3 in) DP gun; 1 × Breda 40 mm (1.6 in) AA gun

The Achimota class are a series of two fast attack craft in service in the Ghana Navy. They are based on the same Lürssen PB 57 design as the Turkish Yıldız class. The two ships of the class include Achimota (the flagship of the Ghana Navy) and Yogaga. The two vessels were acquired by Ghana in the late 1970s and commissioned in 1981. The Achimota class is equipped with an OTO Melara 76-millimetre (3 in) dual-purpose gun, and a 40 mm (1.6 in) anti-aircraft gun. They are primarily used for fishery protection duties.

== Design and description ==
The Achimota-class fast attack craft (FAC) are based on the Lürssen PB 57 design and share a basic layout as the Turkish Yıldız class. The vessels displace 395 metric tons (389 long tons) at full load, are 58.1 metres (190 ft 7 in) long with a beam of 7.6 m (24 ft 11 in) and a draught of 2.8 m (9 ft 2 in). (Note: Gardiner, Chumbley & Budzbon gives the two ships a standard displacement of 380 t (370 long tons) and 410 t (400 long tons) at full load.) The two ships are powered by three MTU 16V 538 TB91 diesel engines each turning one shaft rated at 8,500 kilowatts (11,400 bhp). This gives the FACs a maximum speed of 33 knots (61 km/h; 38 mph) and a range of 3,300 nautical miles (6,100 km; 3,800 mi) at 16 knots (30 km/h; 18 mph).

The FACs mount one OTO Melara 76-millimetre (3 in) dual-purpose gun and one Breda 40 mm (1.6 in) anti-aircraft gun (AA) gun. The Achimota class are equipped with Thomsen-CSF Canopus A surface search and fire control radar a LIDD optronic director. The vessels have a complement of 55, including 5 officers.

== Ships in class ==
Achimota class
Hull number	Name	Builder	Launched	Commissioned	Status
P 28	Achimota	Lürssen, Vegesack, West Germany	14 March 1979	27 March 1981	In service
P 29	Yogaga	Lürssen, Vegesack, West Germany	14 March 1979	27 March 1981	In service

== Construction and career ==
Two FACs were ordered by Ghana in October 1977 from Lürssen to be constructed at their shipyard in Vegesack, West Germany. Both ships were launched on 14 March 1979 and entered service with the Ghana Navy on 27 March 1981. They are primarily used for fisheries protection and patrol. In 1989, Yogaga underwent a major refit at Swan Hunter in Wallsend, United Kingdom which was completed on 8 May. On 14 September 1990, Achimota was hit by National Patriotic Front of Liberia (NPFL) artillery while on a fact-finding mission near Monrovia. As a result, two Ghanaian sailors and three Nigerian nurses were killed, and the Ghanaian Air Force retaliated with airstrikes. Achimota underwent a similar refit to Yogaga at CMN Cherbourg, in Cherbourg Naval Base, France beginning in May 1991. Yogaga was sent to CMN Cherbourg to undergo repairs and work on both FACs was completed in August 1992.

== Sources ==
- Gardiner, Robert; Chumbley, Stephen & Budzbon, Przemysław, eds. (1995). Conway's All the World's Fighting Ships 1947–1995. Annapolis, Maryland: Naval Institute Press. ISBN 978-1-55750-132-5.
- Saunders, Stephen, ed. (2009). Jane's Fighting Ships 2009–2010 (112th ed.). Alexandria, Virginia: Jane's Information Group Inc. ISBN 978-0-7106-2888-6.
