= Rüzgar-class fast attack craft =

Missile boat class

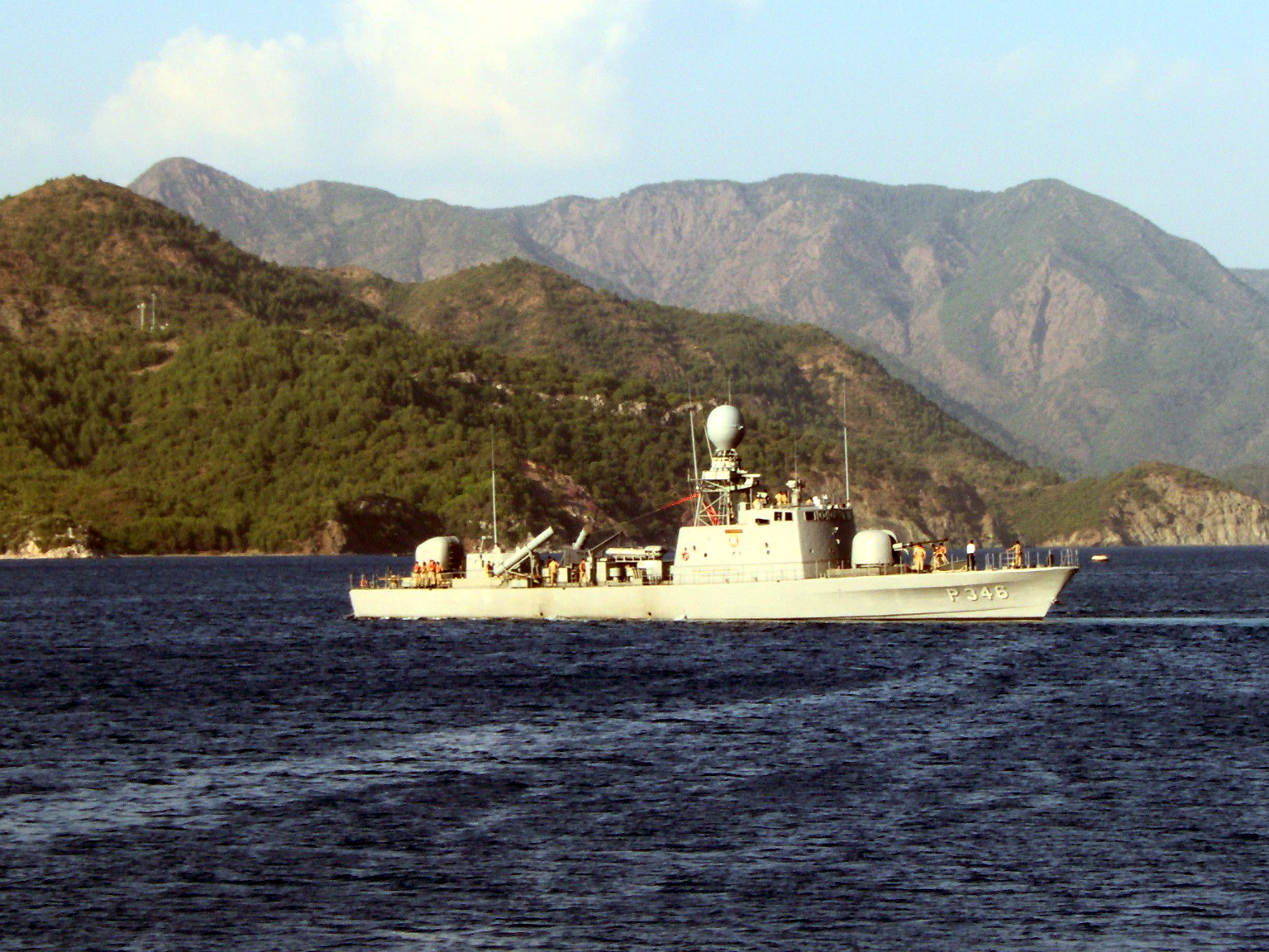
- Girbet

Class overview
- Name: Rüzgar class
- Operators: Turkish Naval Forces
- In commission: 1986–
- Completed: 4
- Active: 4

General characteristics
- Type: Fast attack craft / Missile boat
- Displacement: 410 long tons (417 t)
- Length: 57.84 m (189 ft 9 in)
- Beam: 7.62 m (25 ft 0 in)
- Draught: 2.68 m (8 ft 10 in)
- Propulsion: 4 × 4,250 hp (3,169 kW) MTU diesel engines; 4 shafts
- Speed: 41 knots (76 km/h; 47 mph)
- Range: 1,050 nmi (1,940 km; 1,210 mi) at 30 kn (56 km/h; 35 mph)
- Complement: 45
- Sensors & processing systems: WM 28/41 fire control radar; LIOD Mk.2 fire control radar; Decca 1226 navigation radar
- Electronic warfare & decoys: 2 decoy RL; SUSIE-1 intercept
- Armament: 2 × Harpoon SSM; 1 × Oto Melara 76 mm (3 in) gun; 1 × dual 35 mm (1.4 in) AA gun; 2 × 7.62 mm caliber machine guns

The Rüzgar class is one of the fast attack craft / missile boat classes of the Turkish Navy. Designed by Lürssen Werft in Germany, these ships are almost identical to the Yıldız and Doğan classes, having the same hull, machinery, and weapons. These ships are lighter and faster, and all four ships of the class were built in Turkey.

== List of boats ==
Pennant number	Name	Launched	Commissioned
P-344	Rüzgâr	1984	14 February 1986
P-345	Poyraz	17 December 1984	27 June 1987
P-346	Gurbet	24 July 1987	25 October 1987
P-347	Fırtına	30 April 1988	22 June 1988

== See also ==
- Fast Attack Craft
- Missile Boat
- List of Turkish Navy ships
