= Yıldız-class fast attack craft =

Missile boat class

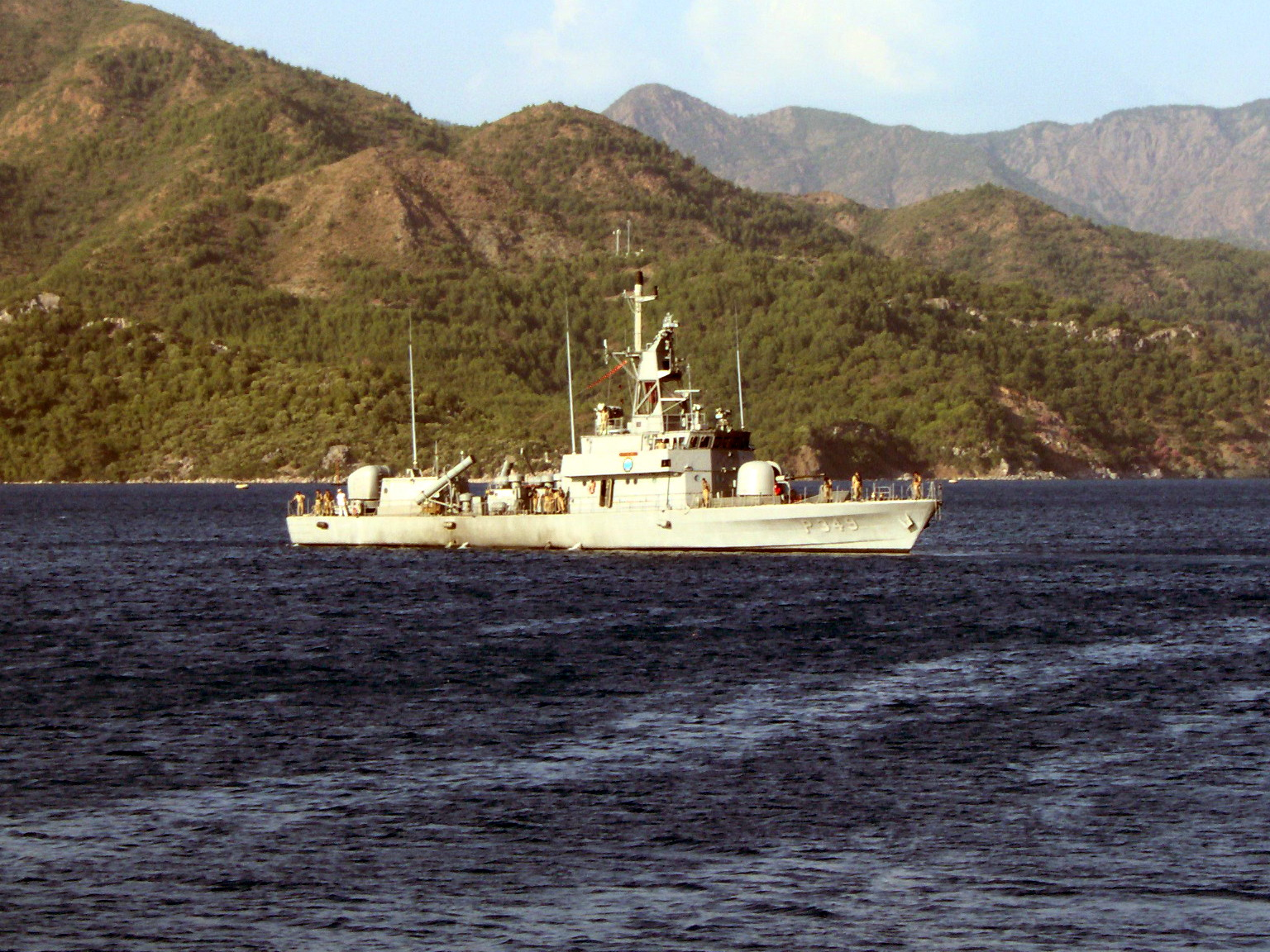
- P-349 Karayel

Class overview
- Name: Yıldız class
- Builders: Taşkisak Yard, Istanbul, Turkey
- Operators: Turkish Naval Forces
- Preceded by: Doğan class
- Succeeded by: Kılıç class
- In commission: 1996–present
- Completed: 2
- Active: 2

General characteristics
- Type: Fast attack craft / missile boat
- Displacement: 433 long tons (440 t)
- Length: 57.8 m (189 ft 8 in) oa; 54.4 m (178 ft 6 in) wl
- Beam: 7.6 m (24 ft 11 in)
- Draught: 2.7 m (8 ft 10 in)
- Propulsion: 4 × MTU 16V956TB91 diesel engines; 15,120 hp (11,275 kW); 4 shafts
- Speed: 38 knots (70 km/h; 44 mph)
- Range: 1,050 nmi (1,940 km; 1,210 mi) at 30 kn (56 km/h; 35 mph)
- Complement: 45
- Sensors & processing systems: AW 6 Dolphin air & surface search radar; TMX-CW fire control radar; LIOD Mk.2 fire control radar; KH1007 navigation radar
- Armament: 2 × Harpoon SSM; 1 × OTO Melara 76 mm (3 in) gun; 1 × dual 35 mm (1.4 in) AA gun

The Yıldız class is series of two fast attack craft/missile boats of the Turkish Navy. The class was designed by Lürssen Werft of Germany and share the same hull layout as the preceding Doğan class. Both ships of the class were built in Turkey and entered service in 1996. They remain in service.

== Description ==
The Yıldız class are missile-carrying fast attack craft (FAC) designed by Lürssen Werft of Germany. They have a full load displacement of 433 long tons (440 t). The FAC measure 57.8 metres (189 ft 8 in) long overall and 54.4 m (178 ft 6 in) at the waterline with a beam of 7.6 m (24 ft 11 in) and a draught of 2.7 m (8 ft 10 in). They share the same hull design as the preceding Doğan class (Lürssen Werft PB 57 design), with a steel hull and aluminium superstructure.

The vessels are propelled by four shafts powered by four MTU 16V956TB91 diesel engines rated at 15,120 horsepower (11,275 kW). The FAC have a maximum speed of 38 knots (70 km/h; 44 mph) and a range of 1,050 nautical miles (1,940 km; 1,210 mi) at 30 knots (56 km/h; 35 mph). The Yıldız class have a complement of 45 including 6 officers.

The Yıldız class are equipped with Siemens/Plessey AW 6 Dolphin air & surface search radar, Oerlikon Contraves TMX-CW fire control radar and a LIOD Mk.2 optronic director. For countermeasures the FAC mount two Mark 36 SRBOC chaff launchers and Racal Cutlass Tacticos combat data system.

The FAC mount two quad launchers for eight Boeing AGM-84 Harpoon surface-to-surface missiles which have a range of 130 kilometres (81 mi) at Mach 0.9. The vessels are also equipped with a OTO Melara 76 mm (3 in) dual-purpose gun mounted forward with a range of 16 km (9.9 mi) against surface targets and 12 kilometres (7.5 mi) against air targets. The Yıldız class also has a dual Oerlikon 35 mm (1.4 in) anti-aircraft (AA) gun mount located aft with a range of 6 km (3.7 mi) against air targets.

== Vessels in class ==
Pennant number	Name	Launched	Commissioned	Status
P-348	Yıldız		3 June 1996	In service
P-349	Karayel	20 June 1995	19 September 1996	In service

== Construction and career ==
Two FAC were ordered in June 1991 from Taşkisak Yard in Istanbul, Turkey. The second ship, Karayel, was launched on 20 June 1995. Yıldız was the first to enter service on 3 June 1996, followed by Karayel on 19 September later that year. Both vessels remain in service. The following Kılıç class are an improved version of the Yıldız class.

== See also ==
- Achimota-class fast attack craft - another class based on the PB 57 design
- List of Turkish Navy ships

== Sources ==
- Saunders, Stephen, ed. (2004). Jane's Fighting Ships 2004–2005 (107 ed.). Alexandria, Virginia: Jane's Information Group Inc. ISBN 0-7106-2623-1.
- Saunders, Stephen, ed. (2009). Jane's Fighting Ships 2009–2010 (112th ed.). Alexandria, Virginia: Jane's Information Group Inc. ISBN 978-0-7106-2888-6.
