= Fast attack craft =

Naval surface vessel capable of high speed designed to attack other watercraft

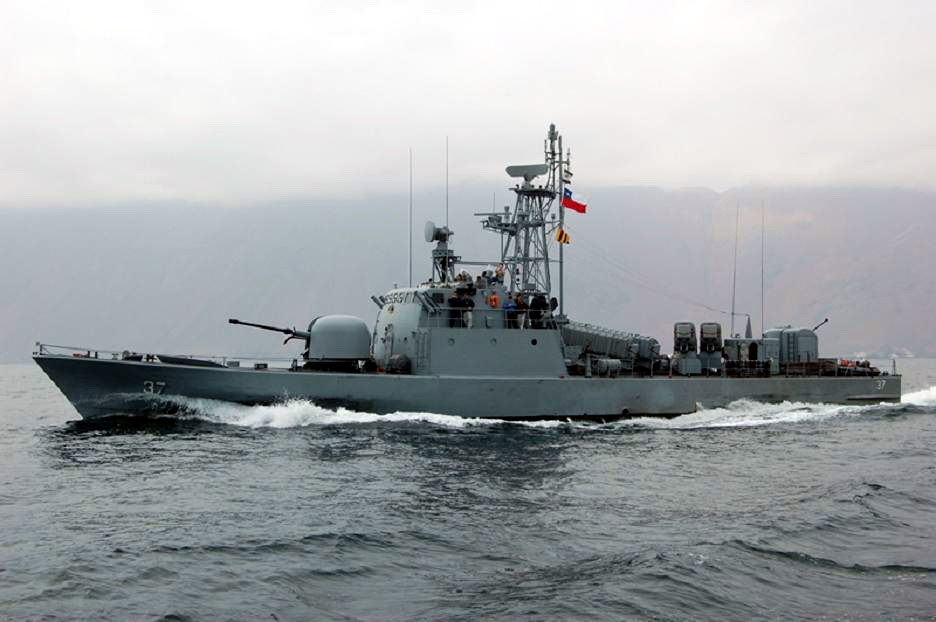
A fast attack craft of the Chilean Navy

A fast attack craft (FAC), sometimes referred to as a Patrol Torpedo Gunboat (PTG) or a Patrol Craft (PCG), is a small, fast, agile, offensive, often affordable warship armed with anti-ship missiles, guns or torpedoes. FACs are usually operated in close proximity to land as they lack both the seakeeping and all-round defensive capabilities to survive in blue water. The size of the vessel also limits the fuel, stores and water supplies. Their displacements are usually under 700 tons, and they can reach speeds of 25+ knots or 46+ kph.

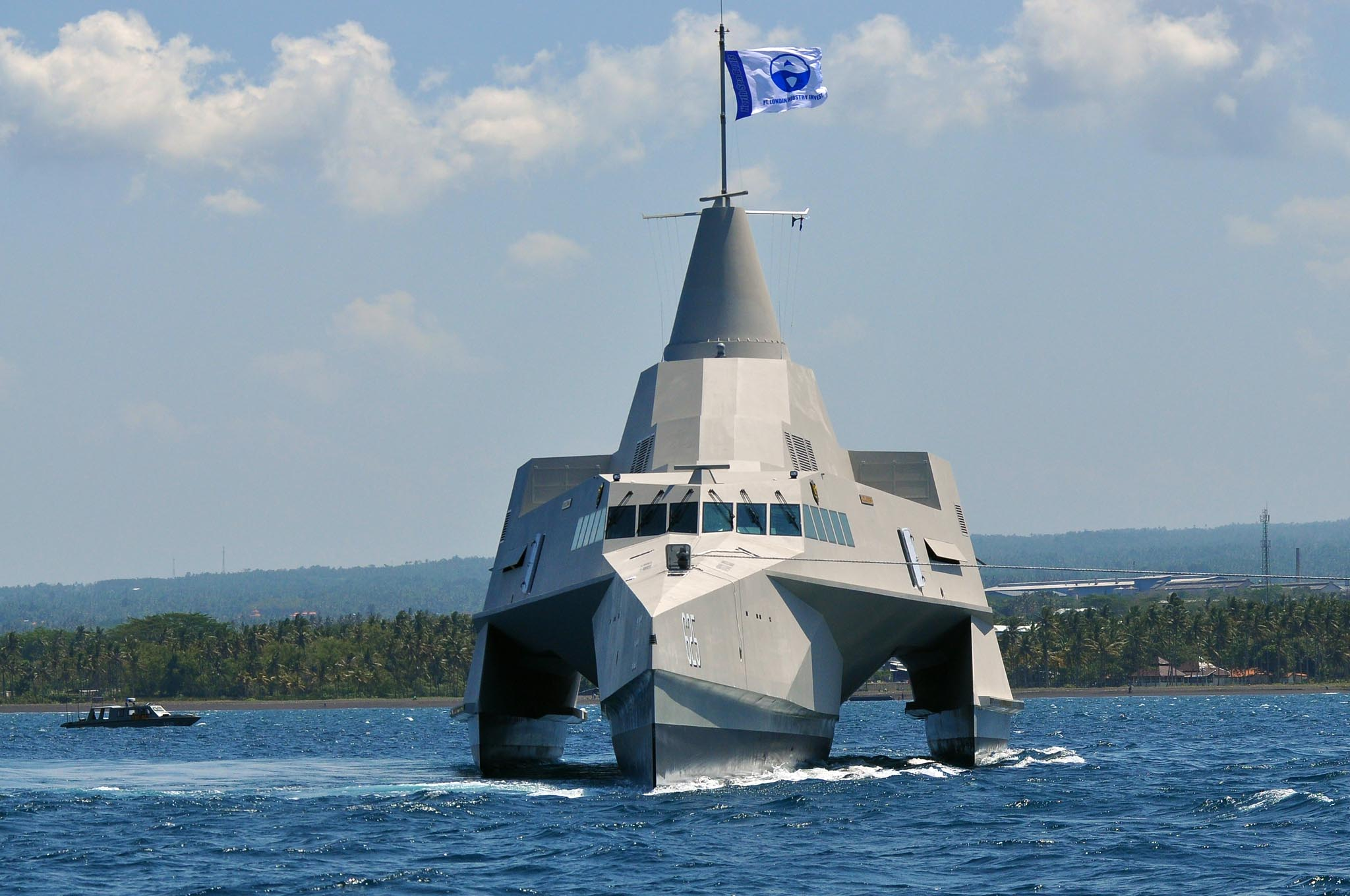
A Klewang-class vessel of the Indonesian Navy

A FAC's main advantage over other warship types is its affordability. Many FACs can be deployed at a relatively low cost, allowing a navy which is at a disadvantage to effectively defend itself against a larger adversary. A small boat, when equipped with the same weapons as its larger counterpart, can pose a serious threat to even the largest of capital ships. Their major disadvantages are poor seagoing qualities, cramped quarters and poor defence against aerial threats.

== History ==
=== 19th century ===
As early as the mid-19th century, the Jeune École's poussiere navale theory called for a great number of small, agile vessels to break up invading fleets of larger vessels. The idea was first put into action in the 1870s with the steam-powered torpedo boats, which were produced in large numbers by both the Royal Navy and the French Navy. These new vessels proved especially susceptible to rough seas and to have limited utility in scouting due to their short endurance and low bridges. The potential threat was countered with the introduction of the Torpedo Boat Destroyer (TBD) in 1893, a larger vessel which evolved into the modern destroyer. It could mount guns capable of destroying the torpedo boat before it was within range to use its own weapons.

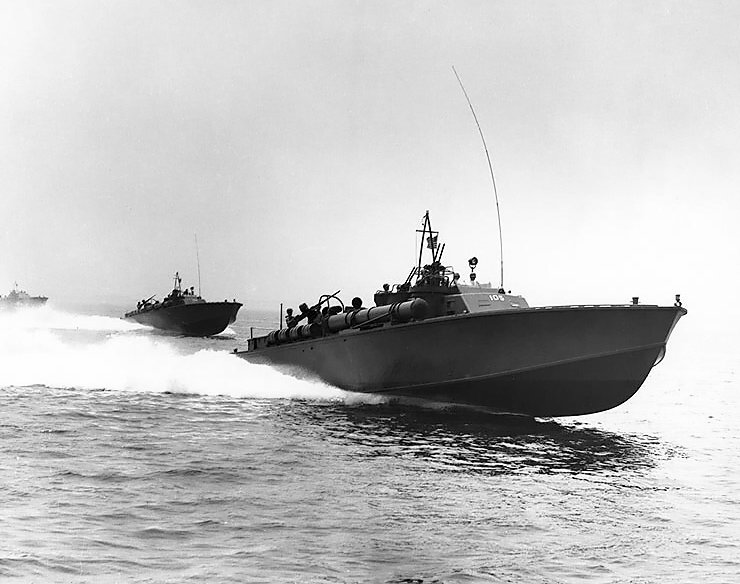
US Navy 80 ft (24 m) Elco PT boats, led by PT-105, at high speed in 1942

=== 20th century ===
The idea was revived shortly before World War I with the craft using new gasoline engines. Italy and Great Britain were at the forefront of this design, with the Coastal Motor Boat (CMB) and the Motobarca Armata Silurante (MAS) (Italian: "torpedo armed motorboat"). The outstanding achievement of the class was the sinking of the Austro-Hungarian battleship SMS Szent István by MAS. 15 on 10 June 1918. The equivalent achievement for the CMBs was a lesser success; during the Russian Civil War CMBs attacked the Red Fleet at anchor at Kronstadt on 18 June 1919, sinking the cruiser Pamiat Azova for the loss of four craft.

The design matured in the mid-1930s as the motor torpedo boats (MTBs) and motor gunboat (MGBs) of the Royal Navy, the PT boats of the US Navy, and the E-boats (Schnellboote) of the Kriegsmarine. All types saw extensive use during World War II but were limited in effectiveness due to the increasing threat of aircraft; however, some successes were achieved in favourable conditions, as showcased by the crippling of the cruiser HMS Manchester (later scuttled), in the night of 13 August 1942, by Italian MS boats.

==== Post-World War II ====
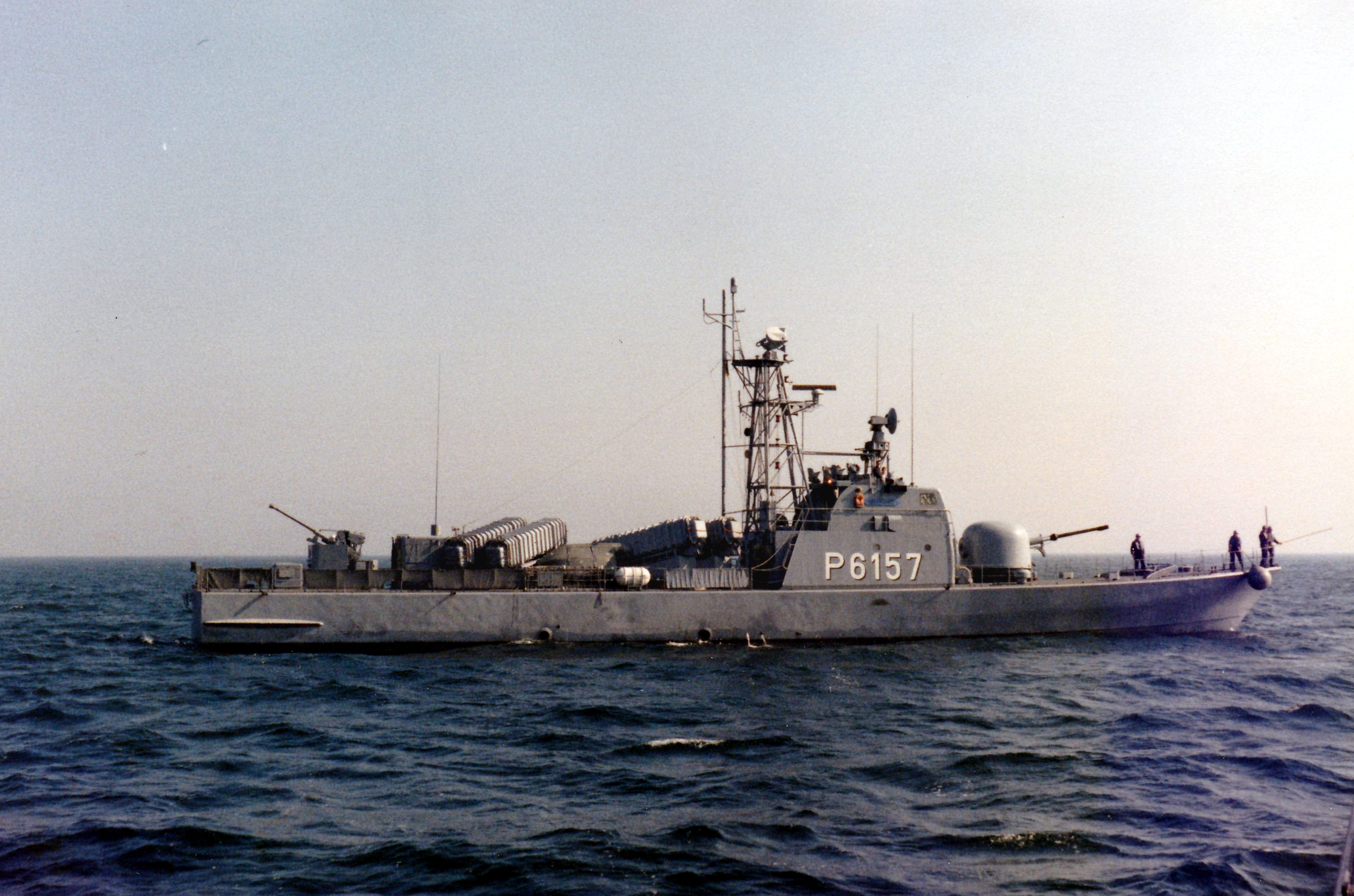
German fast attack craft S57 Weihe (P6157), 1985

After World War II, the use of this kind of craft steadily declined in the United States and Britain, despite the introduction of safer diesel engines to replace the highly flammable gasoline ones, although the Soviet Union still had large numbers of MGBs and MTBs in service.

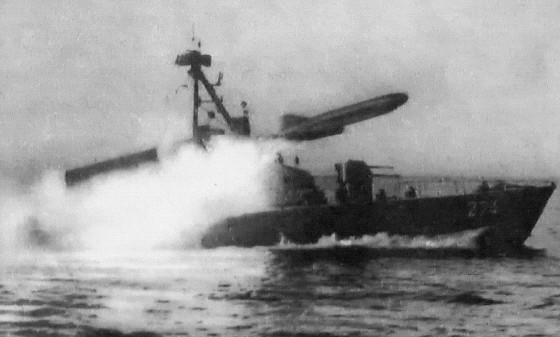
A Komar-class missile boat launching a Styx missile

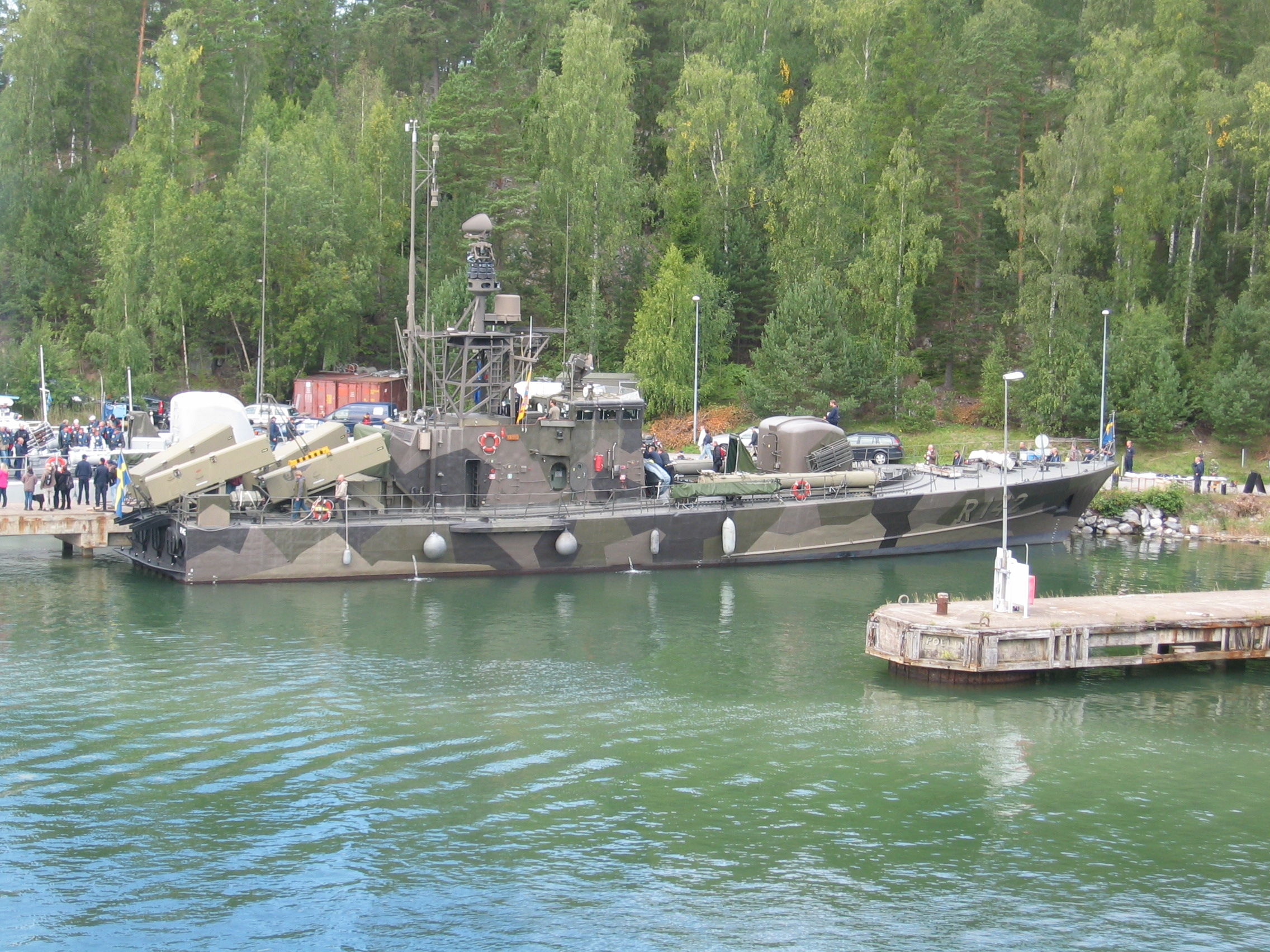
The Swedish Norrköping-class missile boat HSwMS Ystad

With the development of the anti-ship missile, FACs were reborn in the Soviet Union as "missile boats" or "missile cutters". The first few missile boats were originally torpedo boats, with the torpedo tubes replaced by missile launchers. Again, small fast craft could attack and destroy a major warship. The idea was first tested by the Soviet Union which, in August 1957, produced the Komar class which mounted two P-15 Termit missiles on a 25-metre (82 ft) hull with a top speed of around 40 knots (74 km/h; 46 mph). Endurance was limited to 1,000 nautical miles (1,900 km; 1,200 mi) at 12 knots (22 km/h; 14 mph) and the vessels had supplies for only five days at sea. 110 Komar-class vessels were produced, while over 400 examples were built of the following Osa class with a significant portion of the total being sold to pro-Soviet nations.

The first combat use of missile boats was an attack by two Egyptian Soviet-built Komar-class boats on the Israeli destroyer Eilat on 20 October 1967, several months after the Six-Day War. The two boats launched a total of four P-15 missiles, three of which struck the Eilat and sank her with the loss of 47 crew dead or missing and over 90 wounded.

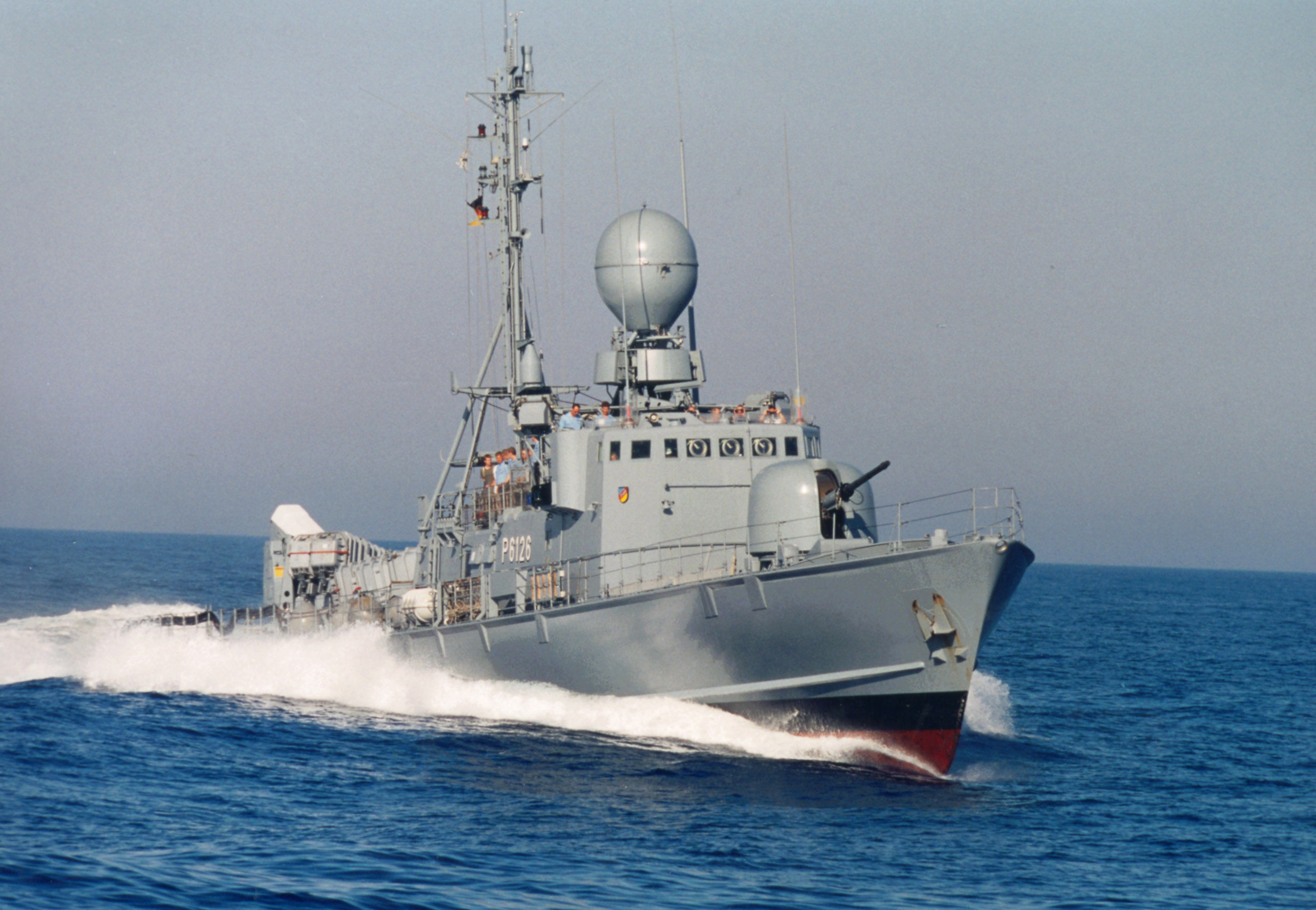
A Gepard-class vessel of the German Navy, 2010

The Soviet FACs prompted a NATO response, which became more intense after the sinking of Eilat. The Germans and French worked together to produce a new FAC, resulting in the La Combattante type, first commissioned in 1968. Built on a 47-or-49-metre (154 or 161 ft) hull with four MM-38 Exocet missiles, a 76 mm gun forward and 40 mm twin guns aft, these vessels have a top speed of 36 knots (67 km/h; 41 mph). Built until 1974, a total of 68 La Combattante IIs were launched. The design was immediately followed by the La Combattante III, and a great many other shipyards produced their own versions of the La Combattante type, including the Israeli Sa'ar/Reshef variants.

Size has also increased, some designs reaching up to corvette size, 800 tonnes including a helicopter, giving them extended modes of operation. While the Israeli Sa'ar 4-class missile boats, for example, had a 58 metre hull and 415-ton displacement, the Sa'ar 5 is 85 metres in length and displaces 1,065 tons, and is officially rated as a corvette.

Iran and North Korea have some of the largest numbers of FACs in operation today. North Korea alone operates more than 300, while Iran has been seen developing "swarm boats" to be used as harassing vessels in the heavily contested littoral waters of the Persian Gulf. To counter the threat, the US Navy has been developing an ASUW Littoral Defensive Anti Surface Warfare doctrine, along with vessels such as the littoral combat ship.

== Current operators ==
- Algerian National Navy operates eight Osa-class.
- Angolan Navy operates six Osa-class
- Argentine Navy operates two Intrépida-class.
- Azerbaijani Navy operates three Osa-class
- Bangladesh Navy operates four Huangfeng-class.
- Royal Brunei Navy operates two Fearless-class, 1 Waspada-class, and 1 Mustaed-class.
- Chilean Navy operates three Sa'ar 4-class.
- People's Liberation Army Navy operates 60 Houbei-class, 18 Houxin-class, and 5 Houjian-class.
- Croatian Navy operates 2 Helsinki-class, 2 Kralj-class, and 1 Končar-class.
- Cuban Revolutionary Navy operates six Osa-class.
- Ecuadorian Navy operates three Seawolf-class.
- Egyptian Navy operates 4 Ezzat-class, 6 October-class, 8 Osa-class, 6 Ramadan-class, 5 Tiger-class, and 4 Shanghai-class.
- Eritrean Navy operates five Osa-class, all captured from Ethiopia.
- Navy of Equatorial Guinea operates two Sa'ar 4-class.
- Finnish Navy operates four Hamina-class and four Rauma-class.
- Gabonese Navy operates the President El Hadj Omar Bongo.
- Ghana Navy operates two Albatros-class and two Gepard-class, all purchased from Germany.
- Hellenic Navy operates 7 Roussen-class, 9 La Combattante III-class, and 3 La Combattante II-class.
- Indian Navy operates 13 Car Nicobar class, 4 Bangaram class, 2 Trinkat-class fast attack craft.
- Indonesian Navy operates 8 Clurit-class, 6 Sampari-class, 6 FPB-57 class, 3 Mandau-class, 1 Belati class and 1 Klewang-class
- Islamic Republic of Iran Navy operates 10 La Combattante II-class and 5 Sina-class.
- Islamic Revolutionary Guard Corps Navy operates 10 Tondar-class, 5 C 14-class, 25 Peykaap II-class, 6 Peykaap III-class and Shahid Rouhi fast attack craft, whilst the Islamic Republic of Iran Navy operates Kaman and Sina classes of fast attack crafts.
- Israeli Navy operates eight Sa'ar 4.5-class.
- Japan Maritime Self-Defense Force operates six Hayabusa-classes.
- Kazakh Naval Forces operates four Kazakhstan-class and a single Mangistau-class.
- Kenya Navy operates two Nyayo-class, and one Madaraka-class.
- Korean People's Navy operates 7 Nongo-class, 10 Osa-class, 6 Komar-class, and 4 Huangfeng-class.
- Republic of Korea Navy operates 30 Yoon Youngha-class.
- Kuwait Navy operates 8 Um Al Maradim-class, a single Istiqlal-class, and a single Al Sanbouk-class.
- Libyan Navy operates a single La Combattante II-class.
- Mexican Navy operates two Sa'ar 4.5-class.
- Montenegrin Navy operates two Končar-class.
- Royal Moroccan Navy operates four Lazaga-class.
- Myanmar Navy operates 2 49m-class, 20 5 Series-class, and 6 Houxin-class.
- Nigerian Navy operates three La Combattante III-class and three Luerssen FPB57-class.
- Pakistan Navy operates four Azmat-class, two Jalalat-class and two Jurrat-class.
- Philippine Navy operates 9 Acero-class Fast Attack Interdiction Craft (FAIC) and 12 Multipurpose Assault Craft (MPAC)
- Polish Navy operates three Orkan-class.
- Seychelles Coast Guard operates two Trinkat-class fast attack craft.
- South African Navy operates a single Warrior-class.
- Sri Lanka Navy operates four Dvora-class and two Sa'ar 4-class.
- Qatari Emiri Navy operates 3 La Combattante III-class and 4 Barzan-class
- Romanian Naval Forces operates three Osa-class.
- Syrian Navy operates 16 Osa-class.
- Republic of China Navy operates 31 Kuang Hua VI-class.
- Tunisian National Navy operates 6 Albatros-class, 3 La Combattante III-class, 3 Bizerte-class, and 5 Shanghai-class.
- Turkish Navy operates 9 Kılıç-class, 2 Yildiz-class, 3 Doğan-class, and 4 Rüzgar-class.
- Turkmen Naval Forces operates six FAC 33-class.
- Ukrainian Navy operates a single Matka-class.
- United Arab Emirates Navy operates six Ban-Yas-class and two Mubarraz-class.
- Bolivarian Navy of Venezuela operates six Constitución-class.
- Vietnam People's Navy operates eight Osa-class and a single BPS-500-class.

== See also ==
- Gunboat
- Motor gunboat
- Torpedo boat
- Motor torpedo boat
- Missile boat
- Patrol boat
- Unmanned surface vehicle
