= Ground radar =

Ground radar (cf. airborne radar system) is a radar positioned on the ground and used for air defense (e.g., ground-controlled interception), command guidance (e.g., ground-directed bombing), air traffic control (i.e., radar control), instrument landing systems, radar bomb scoring, etc.. Ground radar may refer to:

- Air Route Surveillance Radar
- Airport surveillance radar
- Counter-battery radar
- Fire-control radar for ground weapon systems (e.g., Nike missile command guidance)
- Ground-penetrating radar when used from a ground site
- Precision approach radar
- Secondary surveillance radar
- Target acquisition radar
- Weather radar for measurements from the ground (e.g., for local news reports)
