= Doğan-class fast attack craft =

Boat class of Turkish navy

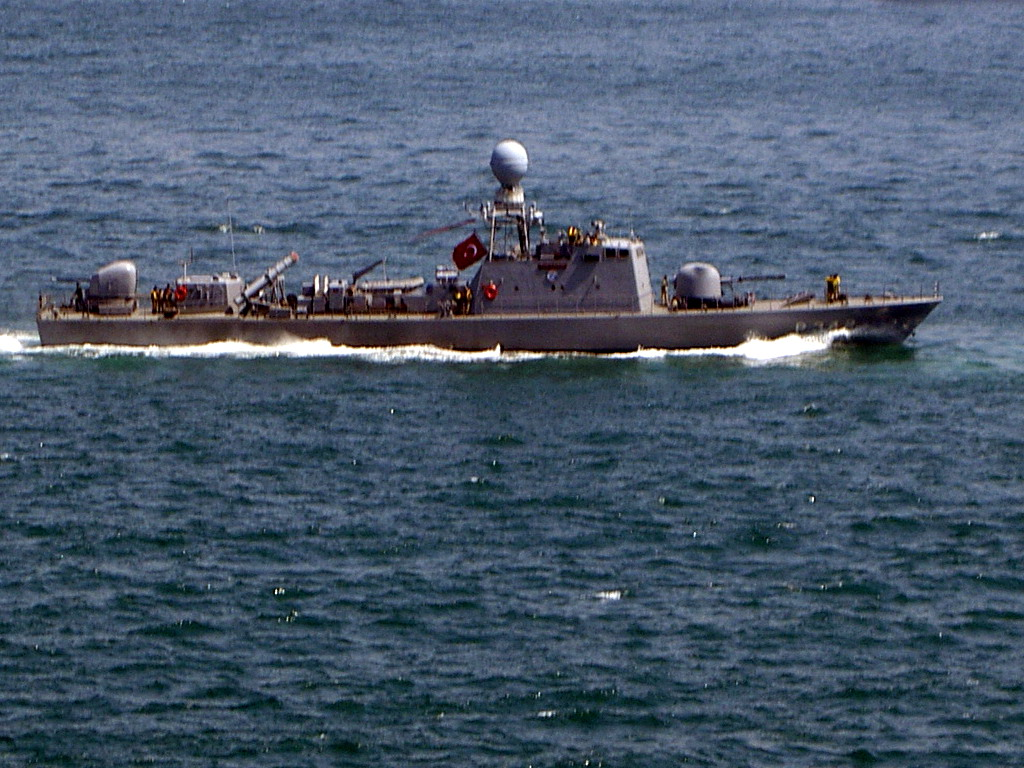
- P-342 Tayfun

Class overview
- Name: Doğan class
- Operators: Turkish Naval Forces
- In commission: 1977–present
- Completed: 4
- Active: 3
- Retired: 1

General characteristics
- Type: Fast attack craft / Missile boat
- Displacement: 436 long tons (443 t)
- Length: 58.1 m (190 ft 7 in)
- Beam: 7.62 m (25 ft 0 in)
- Draught: 2.74 m (9 ft 0 in)
- Propulsion: 4 × MTU diesel engines; 8,948 kW (12,000 hp); 4 shafts
- Speed: 38 knots (70 km/h; 44 mph)
- Range: 1,050 nmi (1,940 km; 1,210 mi) at 30 kn (56 km/h; 35 mph)
- Complement: 40
- Sensors & processing systems: WM 28/41 fire control radar; LIOD Mk.2 fire control radar; Decca 1226 navigation radar
- Electronic warfare & decoys: 2 decoy RL; SUSIE-1 intercept
- Armament: 2 × Harpoon SSM; 1 × Oto Melara 76 mm (3 in) gun; 1 × dual 35 mm (1.4 in) AA gun; 2 × 7.62 mm caliber machine guns

The Doğan class is one of the fast attack craft / missile boat classes of the Turkish Navy.

Designed by Lürssen Werft in Germany, these ships are almost identical to the Yıldız and Rüzgar classes, having the same hull, machinery, and weapons. They were fitted with LIOD Mk.2 electro-optical fire control and TACTICOS command control systems during their mid-life modernization program.

== History ==
TCG Doğan was built in Germany, and the other ships of the class were built in Turkey. TCG Marti was removed from the Turkish Naval Forces Command inventory in 2022. In August 2025, it was provided to the Maldives National Defence Force, where it was commissioned as the CGS Dharumavantha.

== List of boats ==
Pennant number	Name	Launched	Commissioned
P-340	Doğan	16 June 1976	23 December 1977
P-341	Marti	28 July 1977	1 August 1978
P-342	Tayfun	19 July 1979	10 July 1980
P-343	Volkan	11 August 1980	12 May 1981

== See also ==
- List of Turkish Navy ships
