= OTO Melara 76 mm =

Naval artillery piece

OTO 76/62
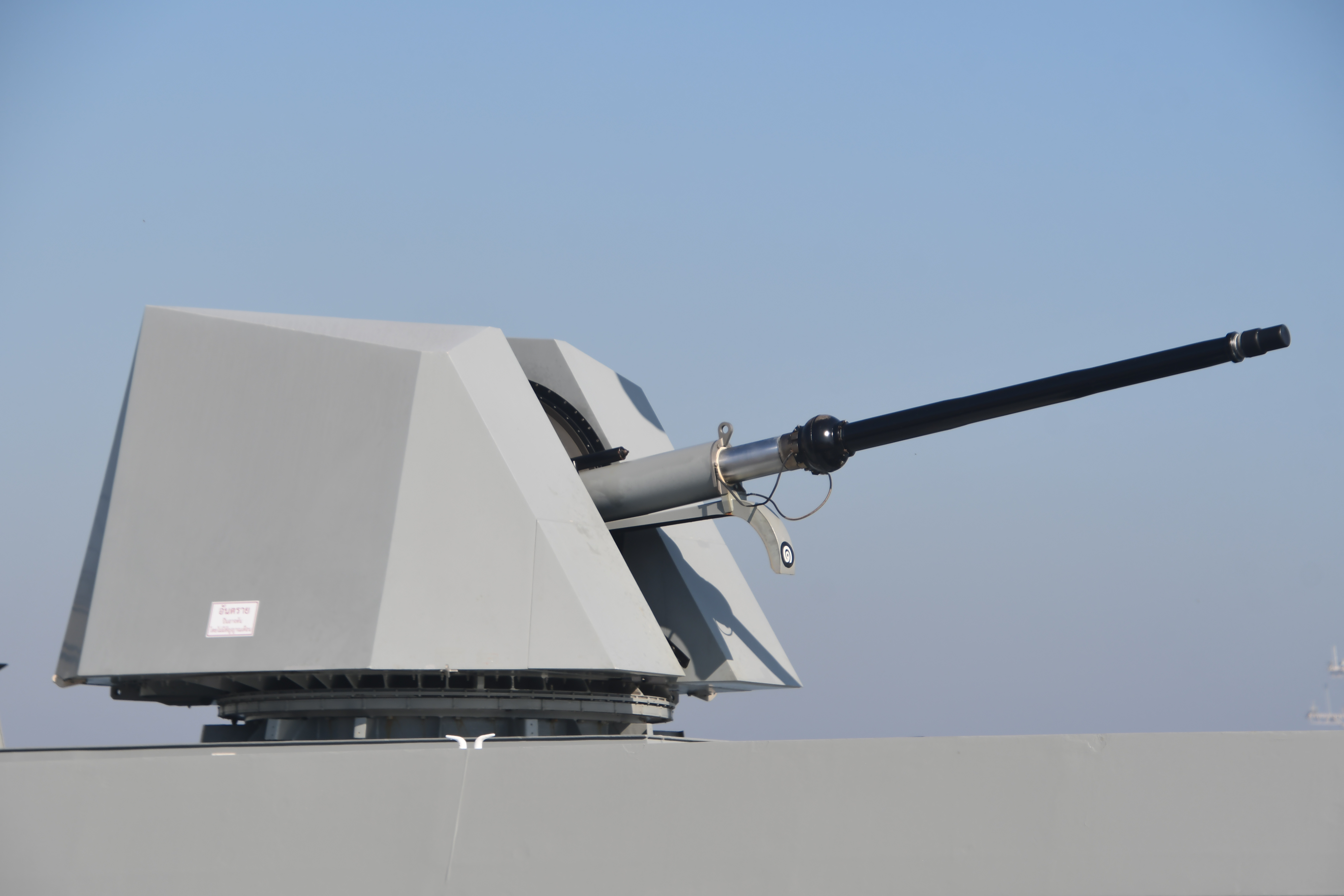
- The OTO 76/62 SR (Super Rapid) as mounted in a stealth turret (to reduce radar cross-section) onboard HTMS Bhumibol Adulyadej.
- Type: Naval gun
- Place of origin: Italy

Service history
- In service: 1964–present
- Used by: See operators

Production history
- Designer: OTO Melara
- Designed: Compact: 1963; Super Rapid: 1985; Strales: 2004
- Manufacturer: Otobreda: 1963–2001; BHEL Haridwar : 1994–present (under licence); OTO Melara (subsidiary of Finmeccanica): 2001–2015; Leonardo-Finmeccanica: since 2016; Leonardo: since 2017
- Produced: Compact: 1964; Super Rapid: 1985; Strales: 2008
- Variants: See variants

Specifications
- Mass: Empty: 7.5 tonnes (17,000 lb)
- Barrel length: 62 caliber: 4,724.4 mm (186.00 in)
- Crew: remote controlled
- Shell: 76×636mmR shell weight 6.3 kilograms (14 lb) propellant weight 2.35 kilograms (5.2 lb)
- Shell weight: 12.4 kg (27 lb)
- Caliber: 76.2 mm (3.00 in)
- Elevation: −15°/+85° speed: 35°/s (acceleration: 72°/s²)
- Traverse: 360° speed: 60°/s (acceleration: 72°/s²)
- Rate of fire: Compact: 85 rounds/min Super Rapid: 120 rounds/min
- Muzzle velocity: 915 m/s (3,000 ft/s)
- Maximum firing range: HE-PFF 16,000 m SAPOMER 20,000 m VULCANO 40,000 m
- Feed system: Magazine capacity: 80 ready rounds on Compact gun mount

The OTO Melara 76 mm gun, marketed as the OTO 76/62 Gun Mount, is a naval autocannon built and designed by the Italian defence company OTO Melara. It is based on the OTO Melara 76/62C and evolved toward 76/62 SR and 76/62 Strales.

The system is compact enough to be installed on relatively small warships. Its high rate of fire and the availability of several types of ammunition make it capable of short-range anti-missile point defence, anti-aircraft, anti-surface, and ground support. Ammunition includes armour-piercing, incendiary, directed fragmentation effects, and a guided round marketed as capable of destroying maneuvering anti-ship missiles. It can be installed in a stealth turret.

The OTO Melara 76 mm has been widely exported, and is in use by sixty navies. It was favored over the French 100mm naval gun for the joint French/Italian Horizon-class frigate project and FREMM frigate.

On 27 September 2006 Iran announced it had started mass production of the Fajr-27, which is a reverse-engineered copy of the OTO Melara 76 mm Compact gun.

== Other specifications ==
- Cooling: sea water—fresh water for flushing
- Electrical Power supply
  - 440 V, 3-phase, 60 Hz, main circuit;
  - 115 V, 1-phase, 400 Hz, servo and synchro network

== Variants ==
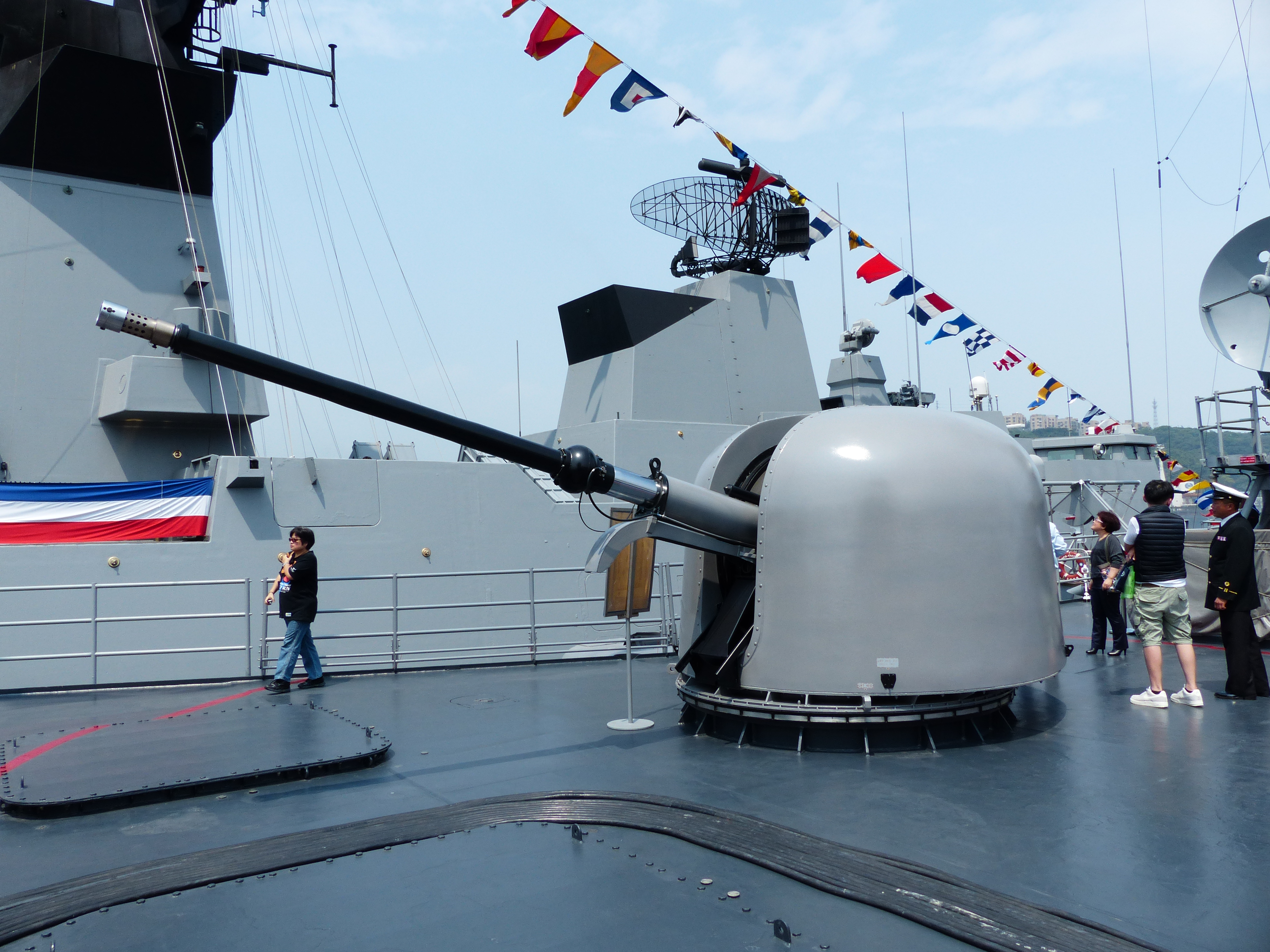
The original "Compact" variant with a circular turret.

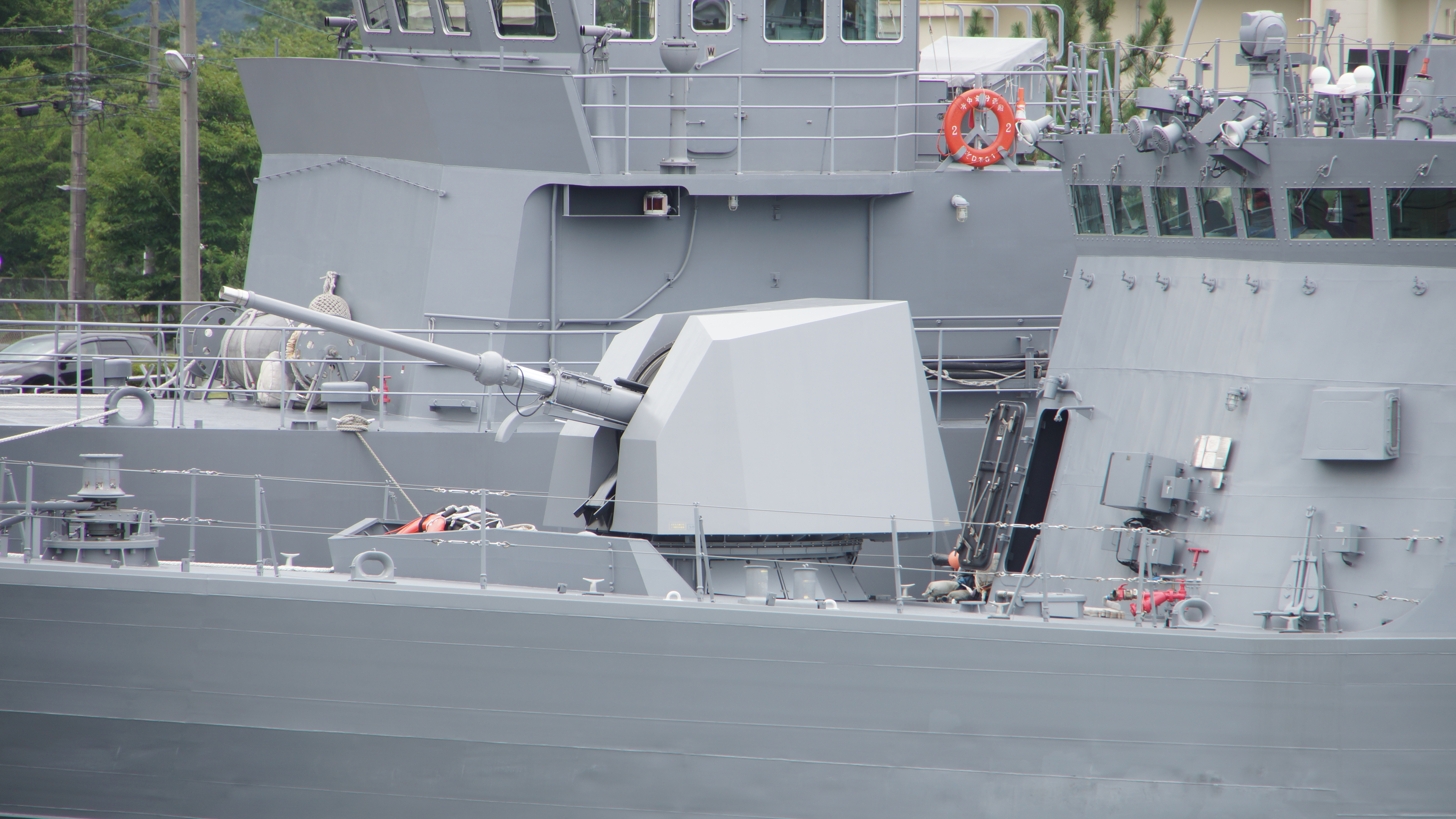
The newer "Super Rapid" version with a diagonal, stealthy turret

=== Compact ===
The original version was created in 1964. Usually carried in a conventional circular turret, it has a rate of fire of 85 rounds per minute. Many smaller or older ships still use this version nowadays, though modern ships increasingly feature the newer super rapid version.

=== Super Rapid (SR) ===
The Super Rapid or "Super Rapido" (SR) variant, with a higher rate of fire of 120 rounds per minute, was developed in the early 1980s and remains current as of 2025. The Super Rapid's higher rate of fire was achieved by designing a faster feed system.

=== Strales System ===
The Italian navy preferred the improved Super Rapido with Strales System and DART ammunition to the Fast Forty 40 mm CIWS in the anti-missile defense role as it is capable of countering several subsonic missiles up to 8,000 meters away. It is a medium caliber gun with relatively long range, and can also be used against surface targets.

=== Sovraponte ===
The 76/62 Sovraponte ("over deck") is a new, compact, lightweight mount for the 76/62 gun. The system is approximately 30–40% lighter than the standard Super Rapid, and its installation requires no penetration of the deck below. The mount accommodates 76 ready-to-fire rounds and is available for sale both with and without the Strales system. The Sovraponte mount was installed for the first time on the Thaon di Revel-class patrol vessel of the Italian Navy, positioned above the roof of the helicopter hangar.

=== BHEL Super Rapid Gun Mount ===
India's Bharat Heavy Electricals Limited (BHEL) manufactures Oto Melara 76 mm gun under license as 76/62 Super Rapid Gun Mount (SRGM) at their facility in Haridwar, Uttarakhand. The SRGM are being supplied to the Indian Navy and the Indian Coast Guard since 1994. BHEL also produces an upgraded variant incorporating the Strales system (with integrated director radar) and DART (guided projectile) and VULCANO (extended effective range) ammunition. The variant was introduced with the Nilgiri-class frigates.

On 28 September 2021, Goa Shipyard placed an order for the upgraded SRGM variants to equip the Triput subclass ships of Talwar-class frigates.

In November 2023, the Ministry of Defence signed a ₹2,956.89 crore (US$310 million) contract with BHEL for 16 upgraded SRGMs and associated equipment for installation on in-service as well as under construction Indian Navy ships at GRSE and MDL.

From June 2025, the Indian Navy started inducting the first Indian-made gun barrels for the gun type which will be utilised on all its current and future warships. The indigenous barrels have been developed over three years by a team of 12 engineers and are being produced at the Field Gun Factory, Kanpur.

== Ammunition ==
To provide multiple roles for the gun, OTO provides the user with wide ranges of specialized ammunition:

- HE standard: weight 6.296 kg, range 16 km, effective 8 km (10 km vs. air targets at 85°)
- MOM: developed by OTO (Multirole OTO Munition)
- PFF: anti-missile projectile, with proximity fuze and tungsten balls embedded in the shell for defined fragmentation effect
- SAPOM: 6.35 kg (0.46 kg HE), range 16 km (SAPOMER: 20 km) semi-armour piercing
- DART: guided projectile for anti-aircraft and anti-missile manoeuvering targets
- VULCANO: 5 kg, guided (GLR) projectile with a maximum range around 40 km (it is a smaller version of the 127 mm Vulcano)

=== Fire control system ===
There were evolutions in the gun's fire control systems as well. The early versions (Compatto) utilised radars such the RTN-10X Orion (made by Selenia, now Selex);

From the early 1980s the gun was equipped with a more powerful and flexible system, the RTN-30X (used with the Dardo-E CIWS system and known within the Italian Navy as SPG-73), that was capable to manage both guns (40, 76, and 127 mm calibres) and missiles (Sea Sparrow-Aspide). This system came into service with the Italian Navy on the cruiser Garibaldi (C551: the RTN-30X entered service first on the Maestrale-class frigates; the Dardo 40 mm turret was slaved to the smaller and older RTN-20X radars), but still with the twin 40 mm Dardo's turrets. The first ship equipped with Dardo E and 76 mm Super Rapido was the upgraded Audace-class destroyers, later followed by the Durand de la Penne class. The 76/62 has also been used with many other fire control systems when not in Italian service.

The Indian Navy ships uses BEL Lynx-U2 fire control system designed, developed and manufactured by Bharat Electronics for these guns.

=== Fuses ===
There have been many developments in the fuses, essential to shoot down low-flying missiles. The best fuze developed for the 76/62 guns is arguably the 3A-Plus programmable multi-role fuse, manufactured by OTO Melara and Simmel Difesa, introduced in the early 2000s. This fuse requires the installation of a fuse programmer in the mount.

The programmable multi-role fuse features several modes including a time mode for air burst and a number of proximity modes: gated proximity, anti-missile proximity, conventional air defense proximity and anti-surface proximity.

The fusing includes a DSP which rejects ground/sea clutter and so is capable of detecting a missile flying as low as two meters above sea level. It has the capability to recognise a target at a 10-meter stand-off. In all, the fuze greatly increases the effectiveness of the gun when engaging anti-ship missiles.

=== DART ===
Since the 1980s efforts were made for development of guided 76 mm ammunition, but this was not achieved until recently. The first such ammunition was the CCS (Course Corrected Shell), also known as 'CORRETTO'; a joint program of OTO and British Aerospace. Work started in 1985. The projectile had several small rockets in order to deviate the trajectory. Radio commands were sent from the ship FCS. The FCS did not know the exact position of the projectile, only that of the target. This system was too complex and unreliable, so OTO studied another development in order to obtain a real 'guided ammunition'.

The result of this development is a system which was called DAVIDE just for the Italian market and STRALES for export purposes while the fired guided ammunition is called DART (Driven Ammunition Reduced Time of flight).

The DART projectile is similar in many aspects to other hyper-velocity systems, for example the Starstreak SAM missile's multi-dart warhead, but is a guided gun projectile with radio controls and a proximity fuze for low level engagement (up to 2 meters over the sea). DART is fired at 1,200 m/s (3,900 ft/s), can reach 5 km range in only 5 seconds, and can perform up to 40G maneuver. The DART projectile is made of two parts: the forward is free to rotate and has two small canard wings for flight control. The aft part has the 2.5 kg warhead (with tungsten cubes and the 3A millimetric wave new fuse), six fixed wings and the radio receivers.

The guidance system is Command Line of Sight (CLOS). It uses a TX antenna installed on gun. The radio-command for them is provided on a broadcast data-link (Ka Band).

The first lot of DART 76mm guided ammunition, produced by OTO Melara, was successfully tested at the end of March, 2014. The firing trials were conducted on board one of the Italian Navy's ships equipped with Strales 76mm SR and Selex NA25 fire control system. The first firing trials of the DART ammunition bought by Colombia in 2012 were successfully conducted in the Caribbean Sea on 29 August from the 76/62 Strales inner-layer defence system fitted to its modernized FS 1500 Padilla-class frigates.

=== VULCANO ===
The more recent development is the VULCANO 76 ammunition system. Basically, it is a scaled-down version of the 127–155 mm Vulcano family of extended-range projectiles developed by OTO Melara; guided by an inertial navigation system and Global Positioning Systems, it is capable of hitting targets twice the distance of normal 76 mm gun ammunition. GPS-IMU guidance and IR or SALT Terminal sensor. The Vulcan 76 GLR ammunition is expected to complete the development, test and qualification process by late 2022 with the delivery of production rounds to customers from 2023–24 onwards.

=== Other uses ===
Most of the basic ammunition types offered for the OTO Melara 76mm can also be fired from the South African Rooikat armoured car with slight modification to change from electric to percussion primers. This is the only land-based vehicle system capable of deploying the same ammunition as its naval counterpart.

== Operators ==
Map with OTO Melara 76 mm operators in blue

=== Asia ===
Bangladesh

- BNS Khalid Bin Walid (Ulsan-class frigate)
- BNS Somudra Joy (ex-USCG Hamilton-class cutter)
- BNS Somudra Avijan (ex-USCG Hamilton-class cutter)

Brunei

- KDB As-Siddiq (ex-Singaporean Fearless-class patrol vessel)
- KDB Al-Faruq (ex-Singaporean Fearless-class patrol vessel)

India

- Visakhapatnam-class destroyer (SRGM)
- Kolkata-class destroyer (SRGM)
- Rajput-class destroyer (3 out of 5 ships after refit)
  - INS Rana (SRGM)
  - INS Ranvir (Compact)
  - INS Ranvijay (SRGM)
- Nilgiri-class frigate (Upgraded SRGM or Strales)
- Shivalik-class frigate (SRGM)
- Talwar-class frigate (3 out of 10 ships)
  - INS Trishul (SRGM)
  - INS Triput (Upgraded SRGM or Strales)
  - INS Tavasya (Upgraded SRGM or Strales)
- Brahmaputra-class frigate (Compact)
- Godavari-class frigate (decommissioned; Compact)
- Kamorta-class corvette (SRGM)
- Kora-class corvette (Compact)
- Veer-class corvette (last 2 of 13 ships)
  - INS Prabal (Compact)
  - INS Pralaya (Compact)
- Samar-class offshore patrol vessel (Indian Coast Guard; Compact)

Indonesia

- Ahmad Yani-class frigate
- Brawijaya-class frigate
- Martadinata-class frigate
- Balaputradewa-class frigate
- Diponegoro-class corvette
- Bung Tomo-class corvette
- Bung Karno-class corvette (1 out of 2 ships)
  - KRI Bung Hatta (planned)
- Raja Haji Fisabilillah-class offshore patrol vessel
- Paiton Naval Gunnery Firing Range (OTO Melara 76mm Compact)

Israel

- Sa'ar 3-class missile boat (decommissioned)
- Sa'ar 4-class missile boat (decommissioned)
- Sa'ar 4.5-class missile boat
- Sa'ar 6-class corvette

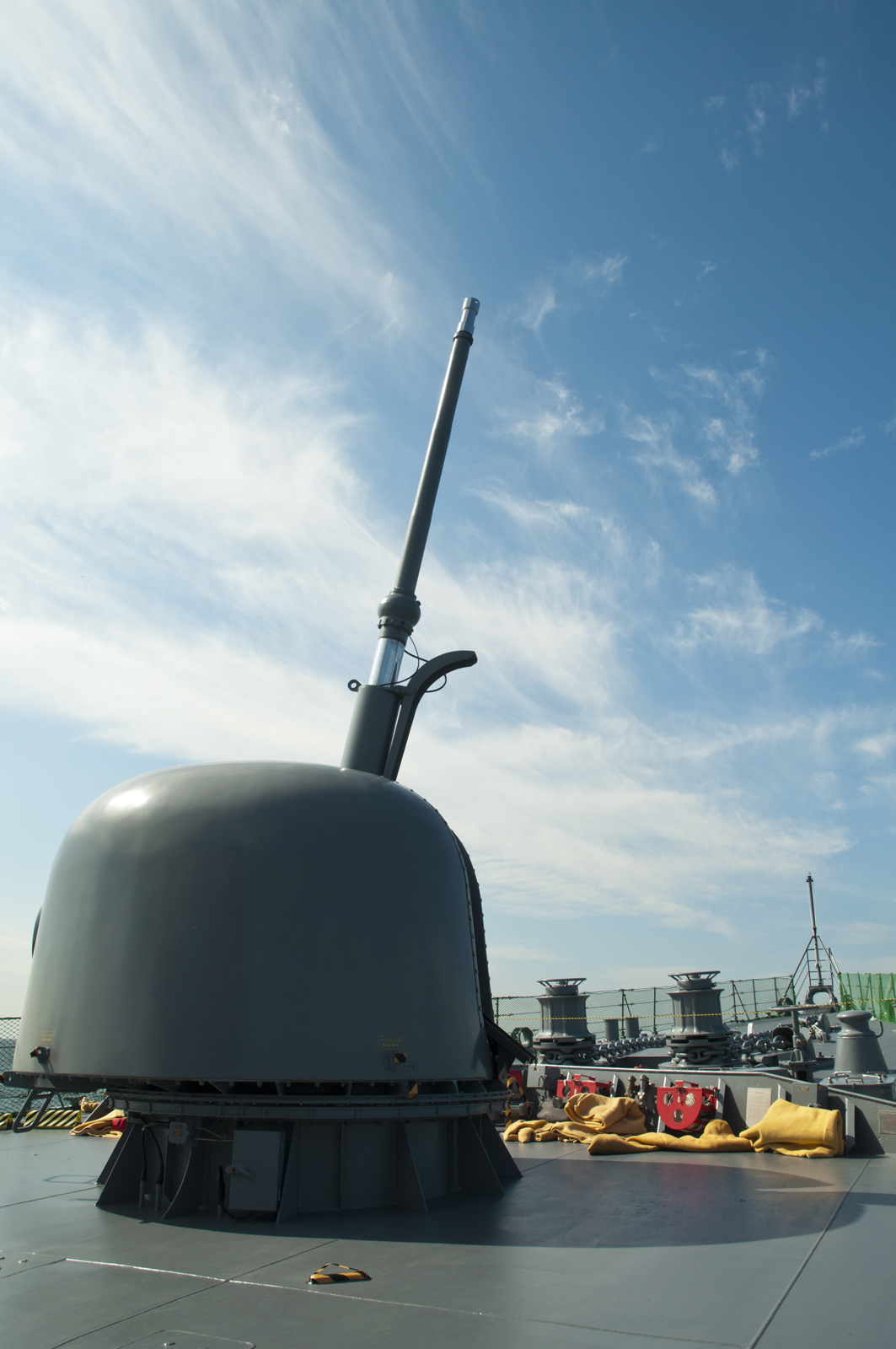
Japanase destroyer Setogiri (DD-156)

Brazlian frigate Tamandaré (F200)

Oto Melara 76 mm models at maximum elevation of +85°

Japan

- Hatsuyuki-class destroyer (decommissioned)
- Asagiri-class destroyer
- Murasame-class destroyer
- Minegumo-class destroyer (JDS Murakumo only) (decommissioned)
- JDS Ishikari (decommissioned)
- Yubari-class destroyer escort (decommissioned)
- Abukuma-class destroyer escort
- Hayabusa-class patrol boat

North Korea (OTO Melara 76mm gun believed to have been acquired illegally from Iran or Myanmar)

- Nampo-class corvette
- Nongo-class Fast Attack Craft

South Korea

- Ulsan-class frigate
- Pohang-class corvette
- Donghae-class corvette (decommissioned)
- Gumdoksuri-class patrol vessel

Malaysia

- Laksamana-class corvette
- Kedah-class offshore patrol vessel
- Ada-class corvette

Myanmar

- Aung Zeya-class frigate
- Kyan Sittha-class frigate
- Thalun-class frigate
- Anawrahta-class corvette

Oman

- Khareef-class corvette

Pakistan

- PNS Alamgir (ex-USN Oliver Hazard Perry-class frigate)
- Babur-class corvette

Philippines

- Miguel Malvar-class frigate
- Jose Rizal-class frigate
- Gregorio del Pilar-class frigate (ex-USCG Hamilton-class cutters)
- BRP Conrado Yap (ex-South Korean Pohang-class corvette)
- Jacinto-class corvette (ex-British Peacock-class corvettes)
- Tarlac-class landing platform dock (planned)
- Rajah Sulayman-class offshore patrol vessel

Saudi Arabia

- Al Riyadh-class frigate
- Badr-class corvette
- Al Sadiq-class patrol boat

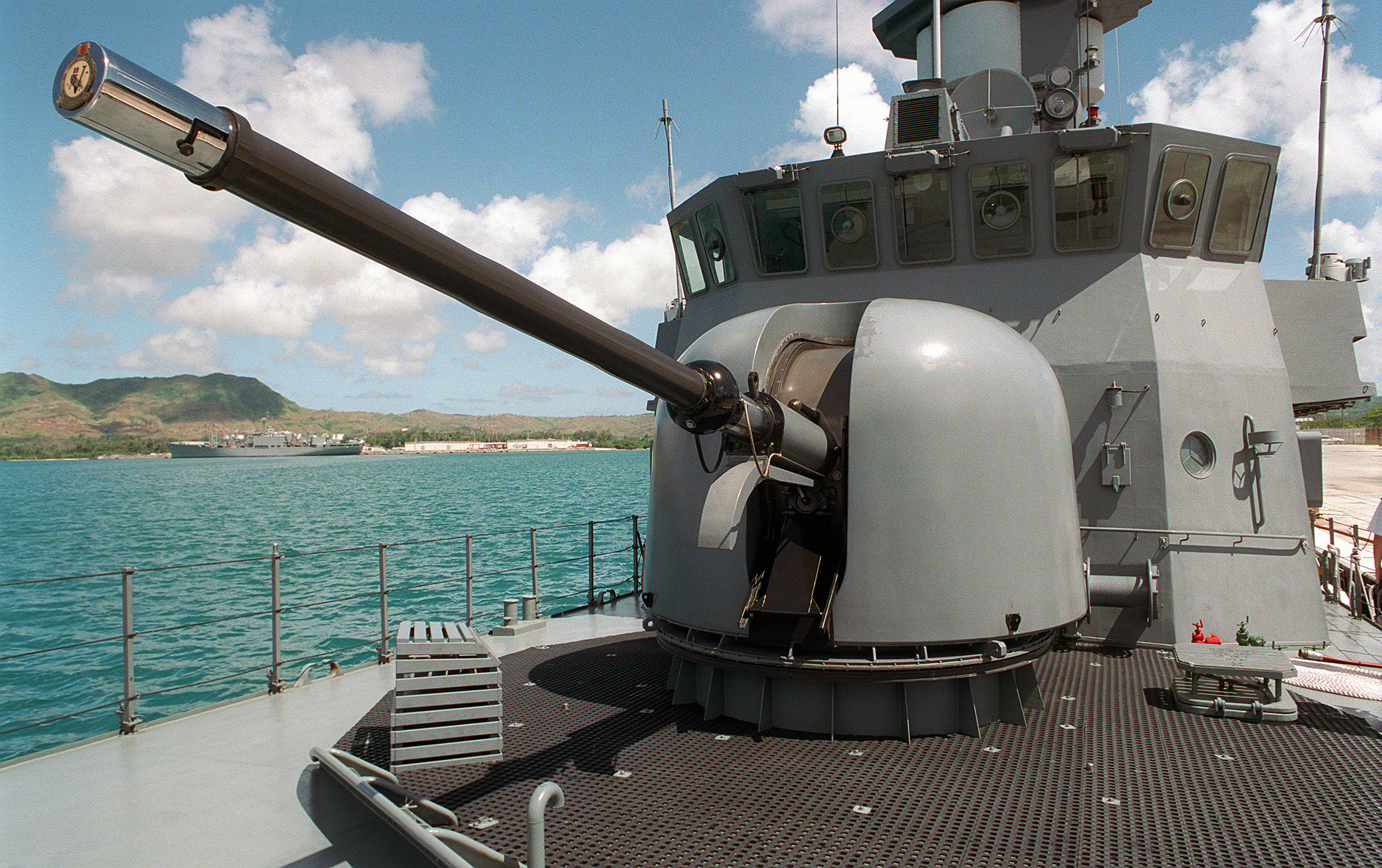
The OTO Melara 76mm Super Rapid gun mounted on the Victory-class corvette – RSS Valour (89)

Singapore

- Endurance-class landing platform dock
- Formidable-class frigate
- Victory-class corvette
- Fearless-class patrol vessel
- Independence-class littoral mission vessel

Sri Lanka

- SLNS Gajabahu (P626) (ex-USCG Hamilton-class cutter)
- SLNS Nandimithra (P701) (ex-Israeli Sa'ar 4-class missile boat)
- SLNS Suranimala (P702) (ex-Israeli Sa'ar 4-class missile boat)

Republic of China

- Cheng Kung-class frigate
- Kang Ding-class frigate
- Tuo Chiang-class corvette
- Ching Chiang-class patrol ship
- Yushan-class landing platform dock

Thailand

- Pattani offshore patrol vessel
- Ratanakosin-class corvette
- Ratcharit-class missile boat
- Chuburi-class patrol boat
- Tapi-class corvette
- Khamronsin-class corvette
- Laemsing-class patrol boat
- Bhumibol Adulyadej-class frigate
- Krabi offshore patrol vessel

Turkey

- Doğan-class fast attack craft
- Kılıç-class fast attack craft
- Kılıç-II-class fast attack craft
- Yıldız-class fast attack craft
- G-class frigate
- Milgem-class corvette

United Arab Emirates

- Baynunah-class corvette

Lebanon

- Combattante FS56-class fast attack craft

Vietnam

- VPNS 18 (ex-South Korean Pohang-class corvette)
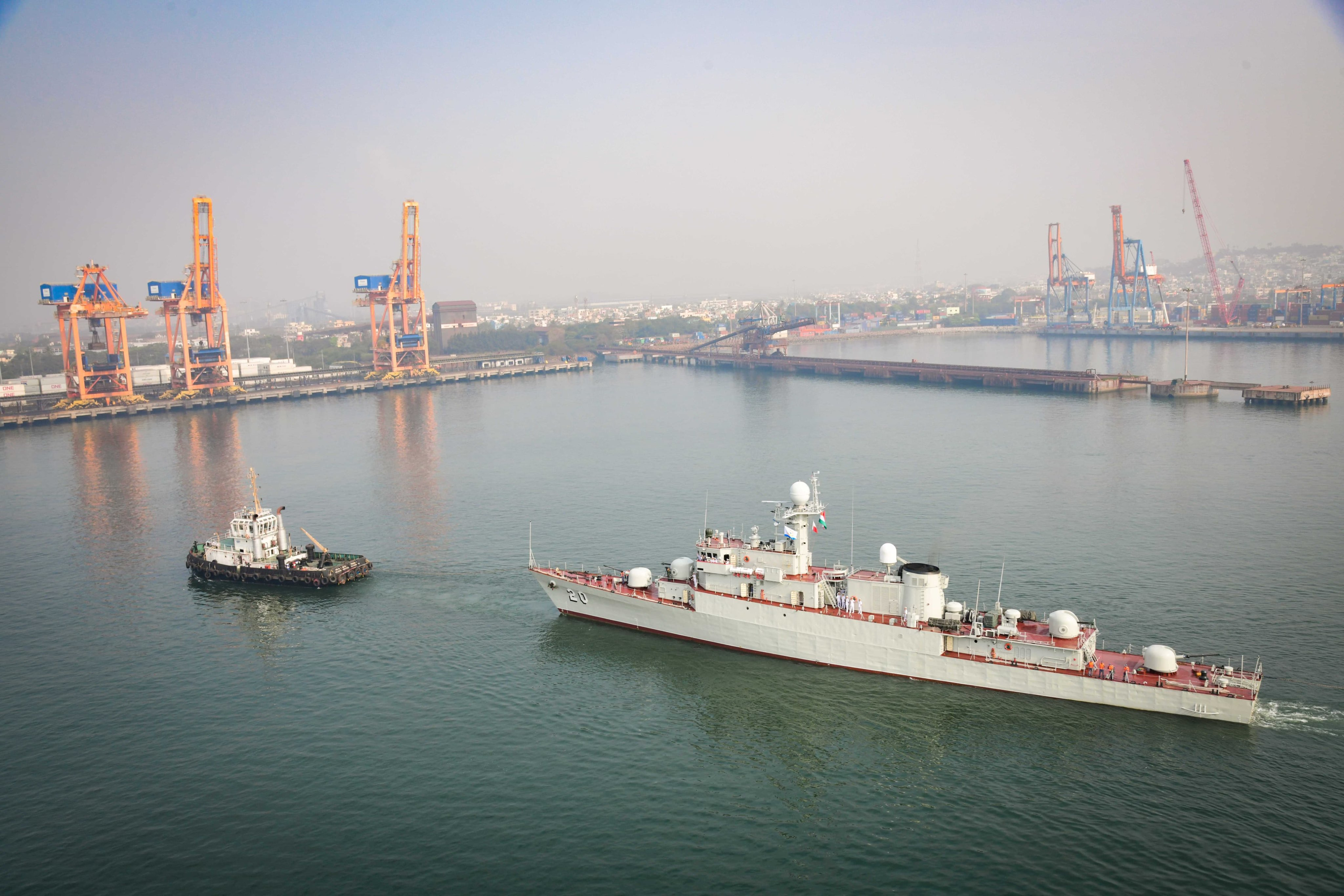
- A Vietnamese Pohang-class corvette with two Oto Melara 76mm Compact gun mounts.
  VPNS 20 (ex-South Korean Pohang-class corvette)
- CSB 8020 (ex-USCG Hamilton-class cutter) (operated by Vietnam Coast Guard)
- CSB 8021 (ex-USCG Hamilton-class cutter) (operated by Vietnam Coast Guard)
- CSB 8022 (ex-USCG Hamilton-class cutter) (operated by Vietnam Coast Guard)

=== Africa ===
Algeria

- Kalaat Béni Abbès-class

Egypt

- Ambassador MK III-class missile boat
- Descubierta-class corvette
- Oliver Hazard Perry-class frigate
- Ramadan-class missile boat
- Tiger-class fast attack craft
- Gowind 2500 corvette
- FREMM multipurpose frigate

Morocco

- Mohammed VI (701) (FREMM multipurpose frigate)
- Sigma-class corvette
- Lieutenant Colonel Errhamani (501) (Descubierta-class corvette)
- Mohammed V (611) and Hassan II (Floréal-class frigates)
- Lazaga-class patrol vessel
- Bir Anzaran-class patrol vessel

South Africa

- Warrior-class patrol vessel (converted from fast attack craft with missiles launchers and rear 76mm gun removed) (1 ship in service)
- Valour-class frigate
- Rooikat

Tunisia

- ex-Albatros-class fast attack crafts

=== Europe ===
Belgium

- Karel Doorman-class frigate
- Anti-Submarine Warfare Frigate

Bulgaria

The Bulgarian Navy's New Multifunctional patrol ships will be armed with an OTO Melara 76/62mm SP/MF(Super Rapid, Multiple feed) Cannon.

Denmark

- Willemoes-class missile boat (decommissioned)
- Niels Juel-class corvette (decommissioned)
- Flyvefisken-class patrol vessel
- Thetis-class ocean patrol vessel
- Iver Huitfeldt-class frigate
- Knud Rasmussen-class patrol vessel

France

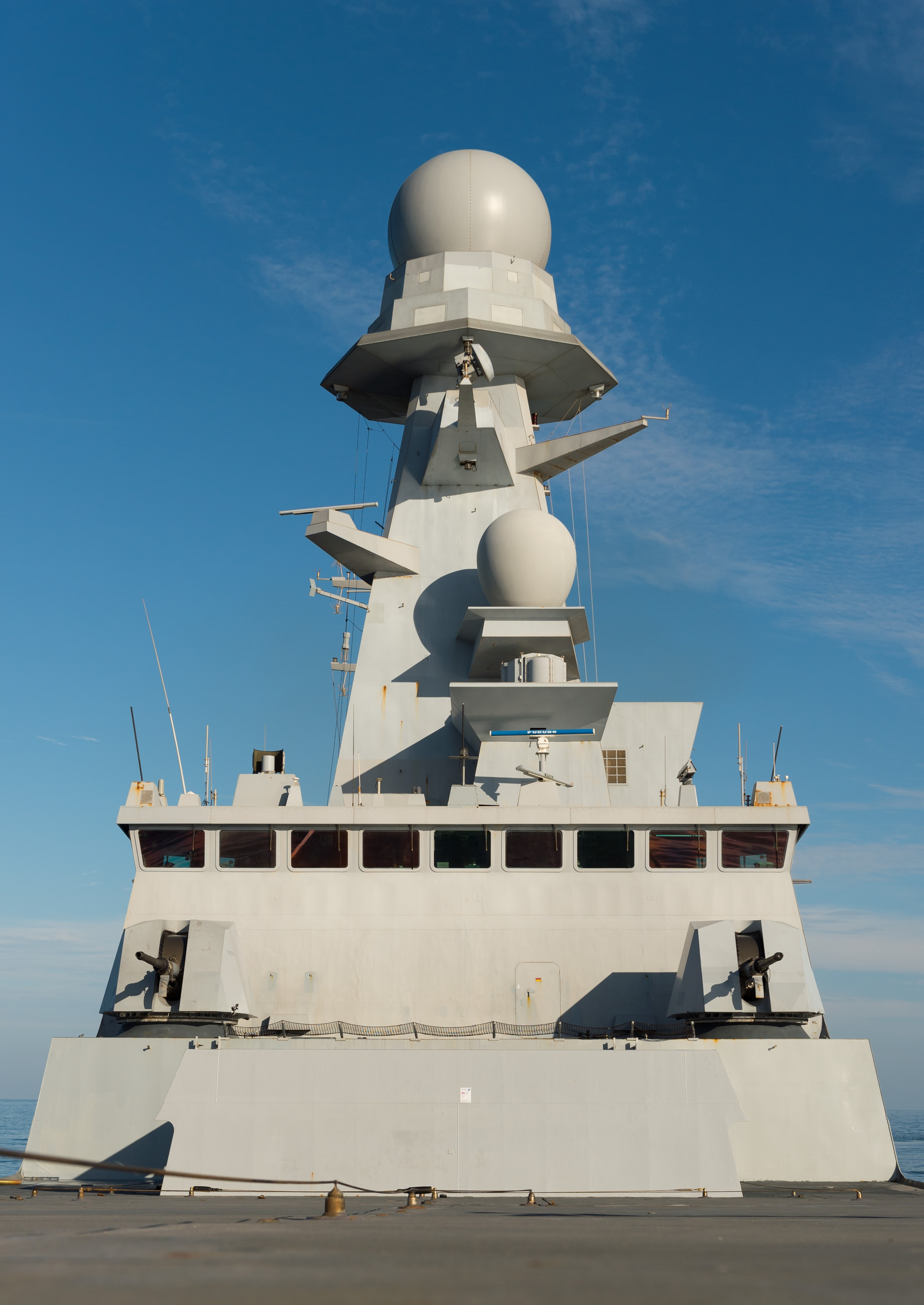
Two turrets on the Horizon type frigate Chevalier Paul.

- Defence and intervention frigate
- FREMM multipurpose frigate
- Horizon-class frigate

Germany

- Brandenburg-class frigate
- Bremen-class frigate (decommissioned)
- Sachsen-class frigate
- Braunschweig-class corvette
- Gepard-class fast attack craft (decommissioned)

Georgia

- Tiger-class fast attack craft (decommissioned)

Greece

- Kimon-class frigate (Defence and intervention frigate)
- Elli-class frigate (Kortenaer-class frigate)
- La Combattante IIa-class fast attack craft
- La Combattante IIIa-class fast attack craft
- La Combattante IIIb-class fast attack craft
- Osprey 55-class gunboat
- HSY-55-class gunboat
- Osprey HSY-56A-class gunboat
- Roussen-class fast attack craft
- Jason-class tank landing ship

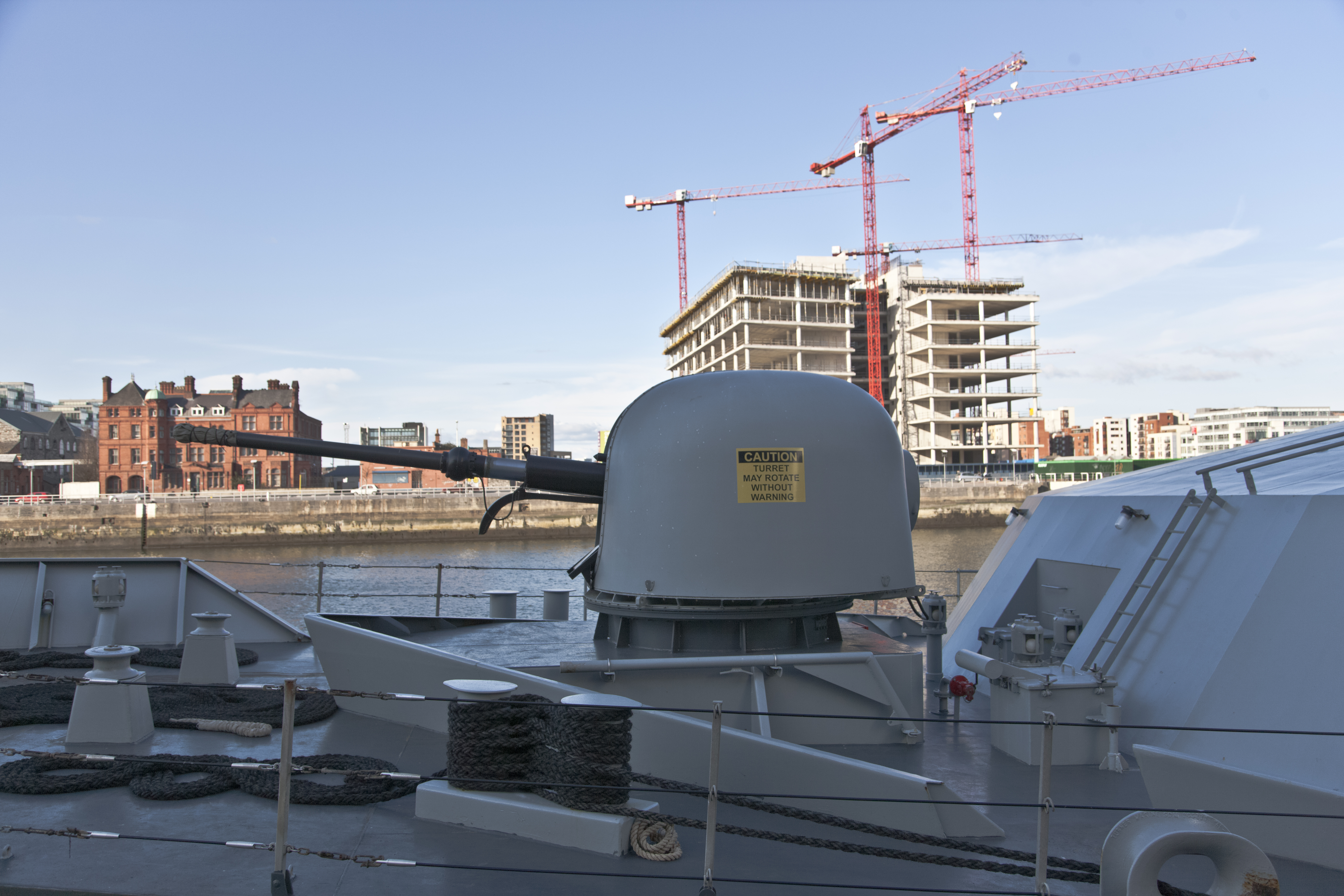
76mm OTO Melara cannon on the Irish Naval Service patrol vessel LÉ Niamh

Ireland

- Peacock-class patrol vessel (decommissioned)
- Róisín-class offshore patrol vessel
- Samuel Beckett-class offshore patrol vessel

Italy

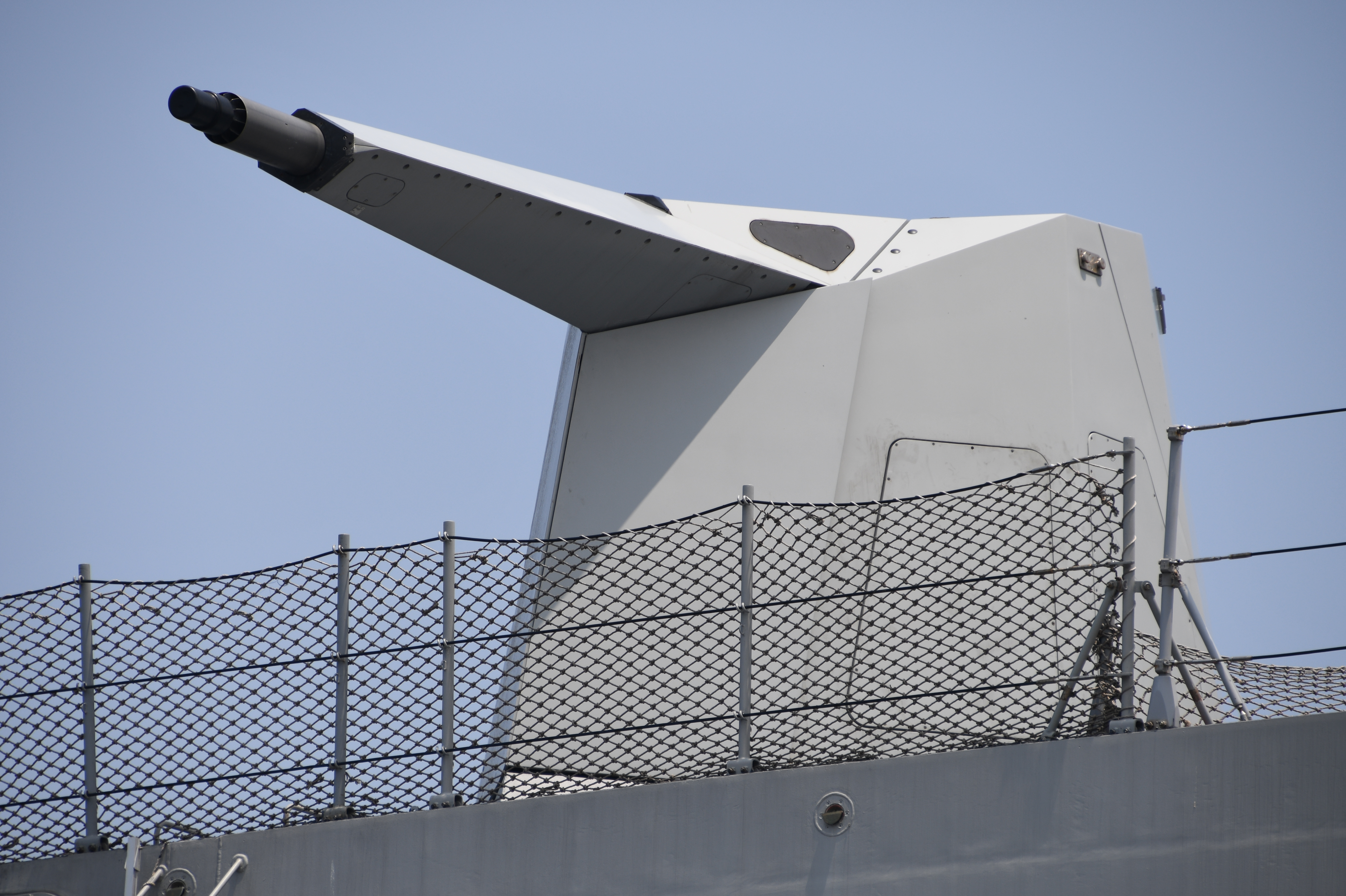
Oto Melara 76/62 mm Strales Sovraponte anti-aircraft gun on the Italian offshore patrol vessel Francesco Morosini

- Audace-class destroyer (decommissioned)
- Italian aircraft carrier Cavour
- Comandanti-class patrol vessel
- Durand de la Penne-class destroyer
- FREMM multipurpose frigate
- Fulmine gunboat (decommissioned)
- Minerva-class corvette (decommissioned)
- Orizzonte-class frigate
- San Giorgio-class amphibious transport dock (1 out of 3 ships after refit)
- Sparviero-class patrol boat (hydrofoil, decommissioned)
- Thaon di Revel-class offshore patrol vessel
- Trieste LHD

Netherlands

- Karel Doorman-class frigate
- Holland-class offshore patrol vessel
- Anti-Submarine Warfare Frigate

Norway

- Fridtjof Nansen-class frigate
- Skjold-class corvette

Poland

- Oliver Hazard Perry-class frigate
- ORP Ślązak offshore patrol vessel

Portugal

- Bartolomeu Dias-class frigate (ex-RNLN Karel Doorman-class frigate)

Romania

- Regele Ferdinand (F221) (ex-British Type 22-class frigate)
- Regina Maria (F222) (ex-British Type 22-class frigate)

Spain

- Santa María-class frigate
- Descubierta-class corvette (decommissioned)
- Meteoro-class offshore patrol vessel

United Kingdom
- Peacock-class patrol vessel (decommissioned)
Ukraine

- Hetman Ivan Mazepa Ada-class corvette (under construction/launched (as of the beginning of 2023))

=== Oceania ===
Australia

- Adelaide-class frigate (decommissioned)

=== North America ===
Canada

- Iroquois-class destroyer (after TRUMP modifications, decommissioned 2017)

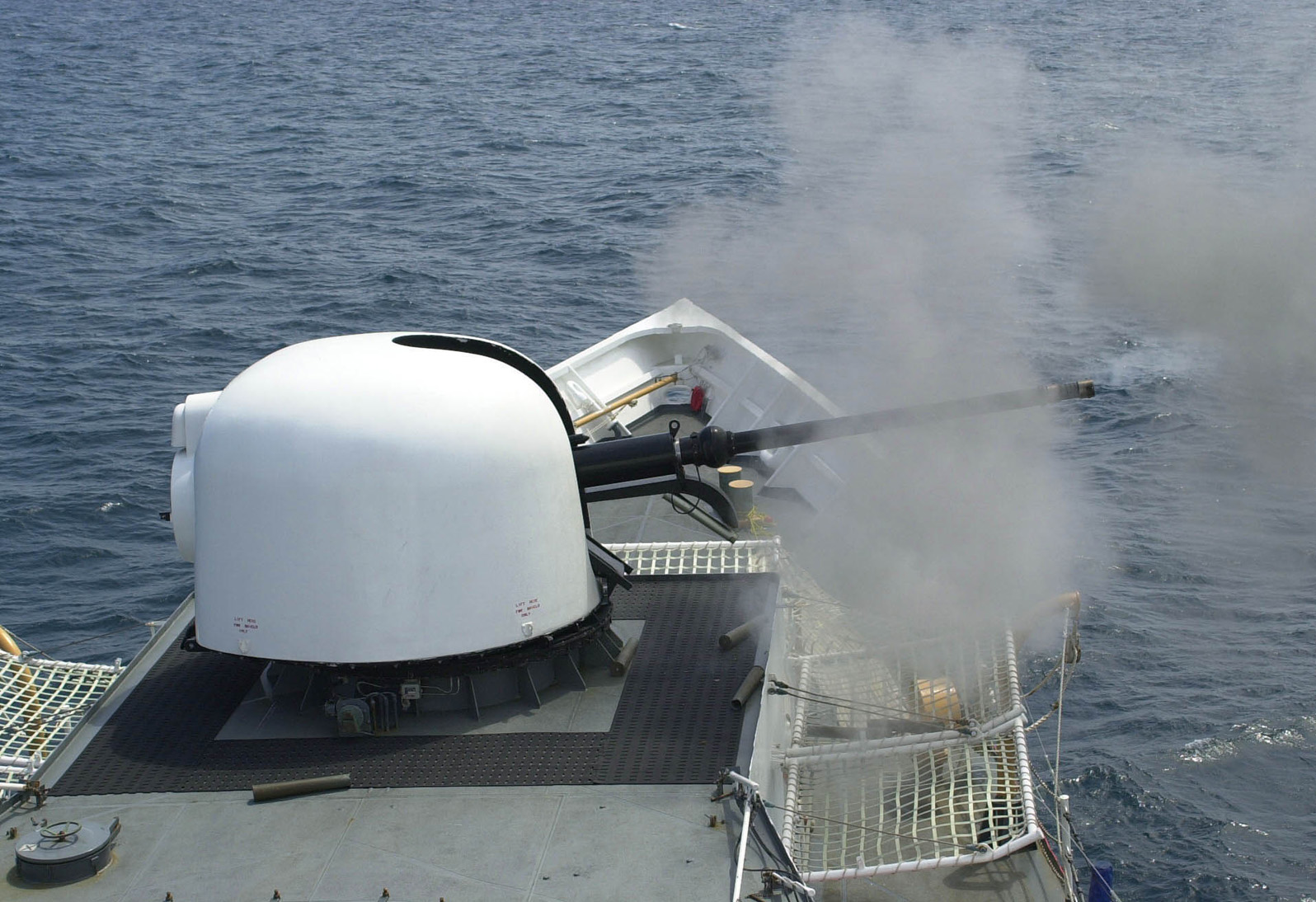
The Mk75 in use aboard USCGC Gallatin, 2005.

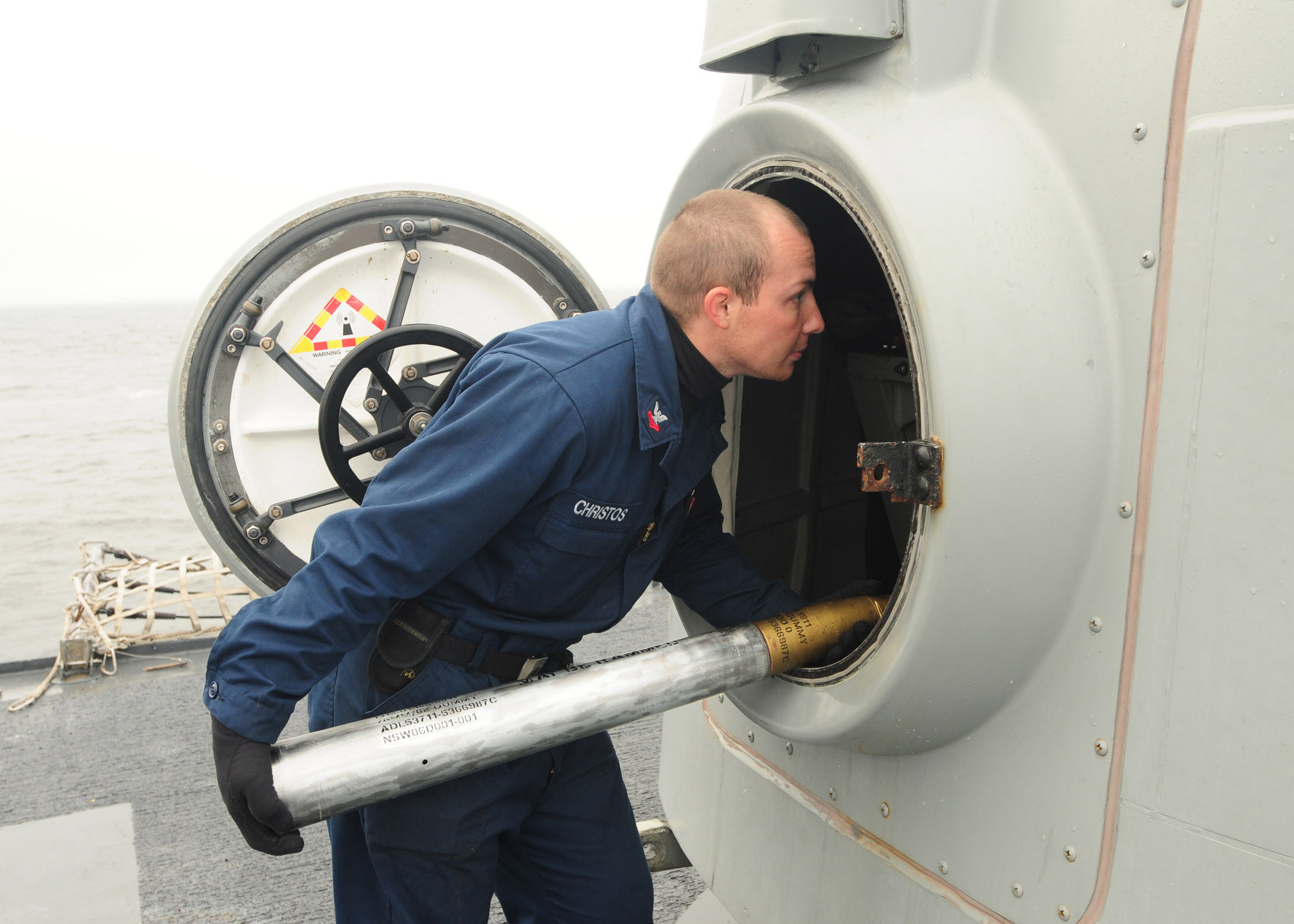
Loading of the 76 mm shells

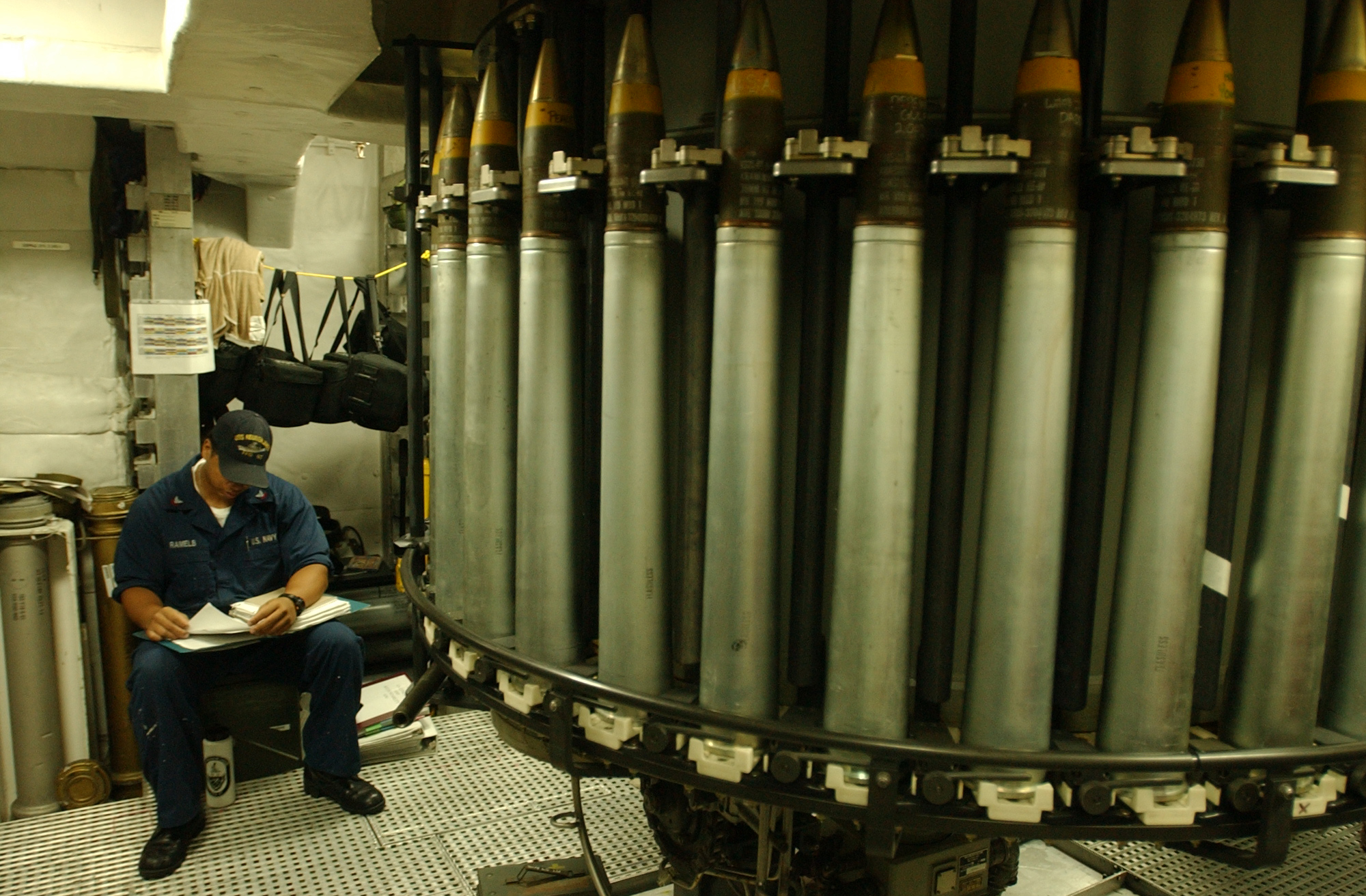
Underdeck of a Mark 75 gun

Various aspect of the OTO Melara 76 mm Mark 75 gun in US service

United States

- Famous-class cutter (USCG)
- Hamilton-class cutter (USCG) (decommissioned)
- Oliver Hazard Perry-class frigate (USN, decommissioned))
- Pegasus-class hydrofoil (USN, decommissioned)

Mexico

- Oaxaca-class patrol vessel

=== South America ===
Argentina

- Espora-class corvette
- Intrépida-class fast attack craft

Brazil

- Tamandaré-class frigate

Chile

- Karel Doorman-class frigate
- CNS Almirante Williams (ex-British Type 22-class frigate)
- Sa'ar 4-class missile boat
- Tiger-class fast attack craft (decommissioned)
- OPV-80-class patrol vessel

Colombia

- Almirante Padilla-class frigate – modernised with Strales 76 mm and DART guided ammunition
- OPV-80-class patrol vessel

Ecuador

- Esmeraldas-class corvette
- Quito-class missile boat

Peru

- PR-72P-class corvette

Venezuela

- Guaiquerí OPV
- Guaicamacuto OPV
- Constitución Class OPV

== See also ==
- 76mm/L62 Allargato – the direct precursor of the Melara
- AK-176 – a similar Soviet/Russian naval gun
- H/PJ-26 - a similar Chinese naval gun
- MKE 76 mm/62-caliber gun – a similar Turkish naval gun
- Otomatic – a land-based SPAA version of the Super Rapid, mounted on OF-40 chassis
- Draco – a land-based SPAA version of the Strales system, mounted on B1 Centauro chassis
- Otobreda 127/64 — a gun of the same family, successor of Otobreda 127/54 Compact
