= Ramadan-class missile boat =

Series of six missile boats in service with the Egyptian Navy

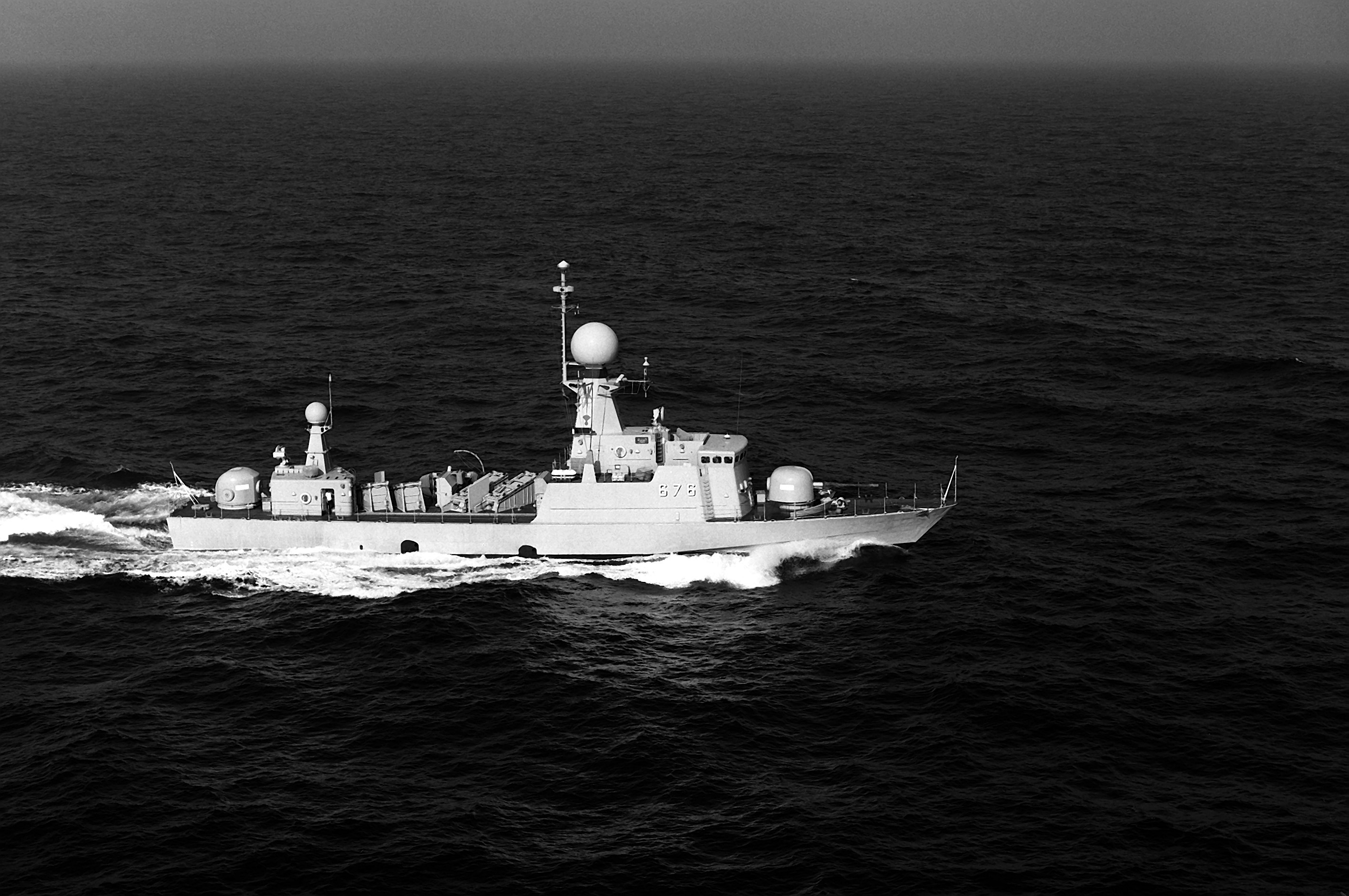
- El Yarmouk underway during Exercise Bright Star, 1983

Class overview
- Name: Ramadan class
- Builders: Vosper Thornycroft, Portchester
- Operators: Egyptian Navy
- Built: 1978–1982
- In commission: 1981–present
- Planned: 6
- Completed: 6
- Active: 4
- Laid up: 2

General characteristics
- Type: Missile boat
- Displacement: 312 t (307 long tons) full load
- Length: 52 m (170 ft 7 in) oa
- Beam: 7.6 m (24 ft 11 in)
- Draught: 2 m (6 ft 7 in)
- Propulsion: 4 × diesel engines, 18,000 bhp (13,423 kW); 4 shafts
- Speed: 35 knots (65 km/h; 40 mph)
- Range: 2,000 nmi (3,700 km; 2,300 mi) at 15 kn (28 km/h; 17 mph)
- Complement: 40
- Sensors & processing systems: S820 air and surface search radar; Cutlass intercept radar; 2 × ST802 fire control radars
- Electronic warfare & decoys: Cygnus jammer; 2 Protean chaff dispensers
- Armament: 2 × twin Otomat Mk2 SSM; 1 × 76 mm (3 in) OTO Melara DP gun; 1 × twin 40 mm (1.6 in) Breda AA gun

The Ramadan-class missile boat are a series of six missile boats that have been in service with the Egyptian Navy since 1981, which were constructed in the United Kingdom. The first ship was launched in 1979 and entered service in 1981. Four remain in service with two laid up.

== Design and description ==
Based on a British design, the Ramadan class measures 52.0 metres (170 ft 7 in) long overall and 48.0 m (157 ft 6 in) between perpendiculars with a beam of 7.6 m (24 ft 11 in) and a draught of 2.0 m (6 ft 7 in). The missile boats have a standard displacement of 307 tonnes (302 long tons) and a full load displacement of 350 t (340 long tons). (Note: Couhat has the ships having a standard displacement of 262 t (258 long tons) and a full load displacement of 312 t (307 long tons).) The vessels are powered by four MTU 20V538 TB 91 diesel engines turning four propeller shafts creating 18,000 brake horsepower (13,000 kW) and a maximum speed of 37 knots (69 km/h; 43 mph). The ships have storage for 43.3 t (42.6 long tons; 47.7 short tons) of oil fuel giving them a range of 2,000 nautical miles (3,700 km; 2,300 mi) at 15 knots (28 km/h; 17 mph). (Note: Couhat has the engines creating 16,000 hp (12,000 kW) and a maximum speed of 35 knots (65 km/h; 40 mph).)

The Ramadan-class missile craft are armed with two twin launchers for Otomat surface-to-surface missiles (SSMs). They also mount one OTO Melara 76-millimetre (3 in) gun forward and a pair of twin-mounted Breda 40 mm (2 in) anti-aircraft guns. In 1981 they were equipped with a Marconi S810 air and surface search radar and two ST802 fire control radars. The two ST802 radars work in tandem with the Marconi Sapphire fire control system (also known as Sea Archer 1A) alongside two Lawrence Scott optical directors. The ships were later updated with a Decca-Racal Cygnus jammer, two MEL Protean chaff dispensers and Cutlass intercept radar. They have a complement of 40.

== Ships in class ==
Construction data
| Number | Name | Builder | Laid down | Launched | Commissioned | Status |
|---|---|---|---|---|---|---|
| 561, 670 | Ramadan | Vosper Thornycroft, Portchester, United Kingdom | 22 September 1978 | 6 September 1979 | 20 July 1981 | Laid up |
| 562, 674 | El Kadesseya | Vosper Thornycroft, Portchester, United Kingdom | 23 February 1979 | 31 January 1980 | 15 September 1981 | Laid up |
| 563, 672 | Khyber | Vosper Thornycroft, Portchester, United Kingdom | 23 April 1979 | 19 February 1980 | 6 April 1982 | Active |
| 564, 676 | El Yarmouk | Vosper Thornycroft, Portchester, United Kingdom | 15 May 1979 | 12 June 1980 | 18 May 1982 | Active |
| 565, 678 | Badr | Vosper Thornycroft, Portchester, United Kingdom | 29 September 1979 | 17 June 1981 | 17 June 1982 | Active |
| 566, 680 | Hettein | Vosper Thornycroft, Portchester, United Kingdom | 29 February 1980 | 25 November 1980 | 28 October 1982 | Active |

== Construction and career ==
The six ships were ordered on 4 September 1977 from Vosper Thornycroft of the United Kingdom. After construction the first pair sailed together for Egypt and arrived on 13 November 1981. The second pair arrived on 23 July 1982 and the third pair in December 1982. In 1998, two of the class had their radars upgraded, followed by the remaining four beginning in 2001. In March 2000, all six vessels had their communications systems upgraded. Beginning in 2007, their CAAIS data system was upgraded to the Nautis-3 command-and-control data system along with an upgrade from the Mk1 Otomats to the Mk2 version. El Kadesseya was taken out of service in 2000, followed by Ramadan in 2005.
