= Nongo-class warship =

Medium-size warships built by North Korea

Class overview
- Name: Nongo class
- Operators: Korean People's Navy
- In service: 2000s
- Completed: 6

General characteristics
- Displacement: 200 tons
- Length: 35 m (114 ft 10 in) or 40 m (131 ft 3 in) (according to the subclass)
- Beam: 12 m (39 ft 4 in)
- Propulsion: Surface effect
- Speed: 48 knots (89 km/h; 55 mph)
- Armament: Various (76 mm 57 mm, or 30 mm guns, Kh-35 missiles, according to the sub-class)

The Nongo class is a term used by the US Department of Defense to identify a series of new medium-size warships built by North Korea starting in the 2000s. Few such vessels are believed to be in service, but they appear to form the core of a modernized Korean People's Navy.

== Features and design ==
In late 1980s the North Korean shipbuilding industry experimented with a large warship with an innovative catamaran-hull design, the Soho-class frigate. After the 1990s, when the North Korean economy showed some signs of recovering after the great famine, the Korean People's Navy started introducing again this design to modernize its fleet of medium-size vessels.

North Koreans implemented the catamaran design, adopting Surface Effect Ship technology. The design is relatively advanced, and adopted by few Navies in the world. The first vessels of the class (the "pure" Nongo) appear to also have stealth lines. Considering the lack of official North Korean released data, most features, design and details are speculations of analysts after observation of satellite pictures.

== Weapons ==
Weapons appears to be related with the different sub-classes, and different evaluations were given by analysts. The original stealth SES Nongo show only surface artillery weapons: a gun of 57 mm (2.2 in) and a turret of 30 mm (1.2 in) guns.

The missile boat variants were initially evaluated as being armed with one 85 mm (3.3 in) gun, one or two 30 mm turrets and an unknown type of anti-ship missiles.

Later, a North Korean propaganda video showed that the missile boats are indeed armed with the relatively effective Russian Kh-35 missiles. Also the gun appears to be different, a reverse-engineered 76 mm (3.0 in) turret (probably related to the Iranian Fajr-27, a reverse-engineered variant of the Italian OTO Melara 76 mm gun).

Despite being probably less advanced than their South Korean rivals, the Nongo-class missile boats could on paper face the South Korean Gumdoksuri-class patrol vessel sharing the same artillery (76 mm) and anti-ship missiles (even if the South Korean vessels are larger).

In January 2015 the first pictures of a Nongo-class vessel (of the stealth sub-class) were released by KCNA, employing a reverse-engineered Kh-35 missile in testing.

== Subclasses ==
At least 3 subclasses are known:

- Original stealth SES
- "A" type missile boats (not-stealth, size reduced)
- "B" type missile boats (not-stealth, size reduced)
