= Kılıç-class fast attack craft =

Turkish navy missile boat

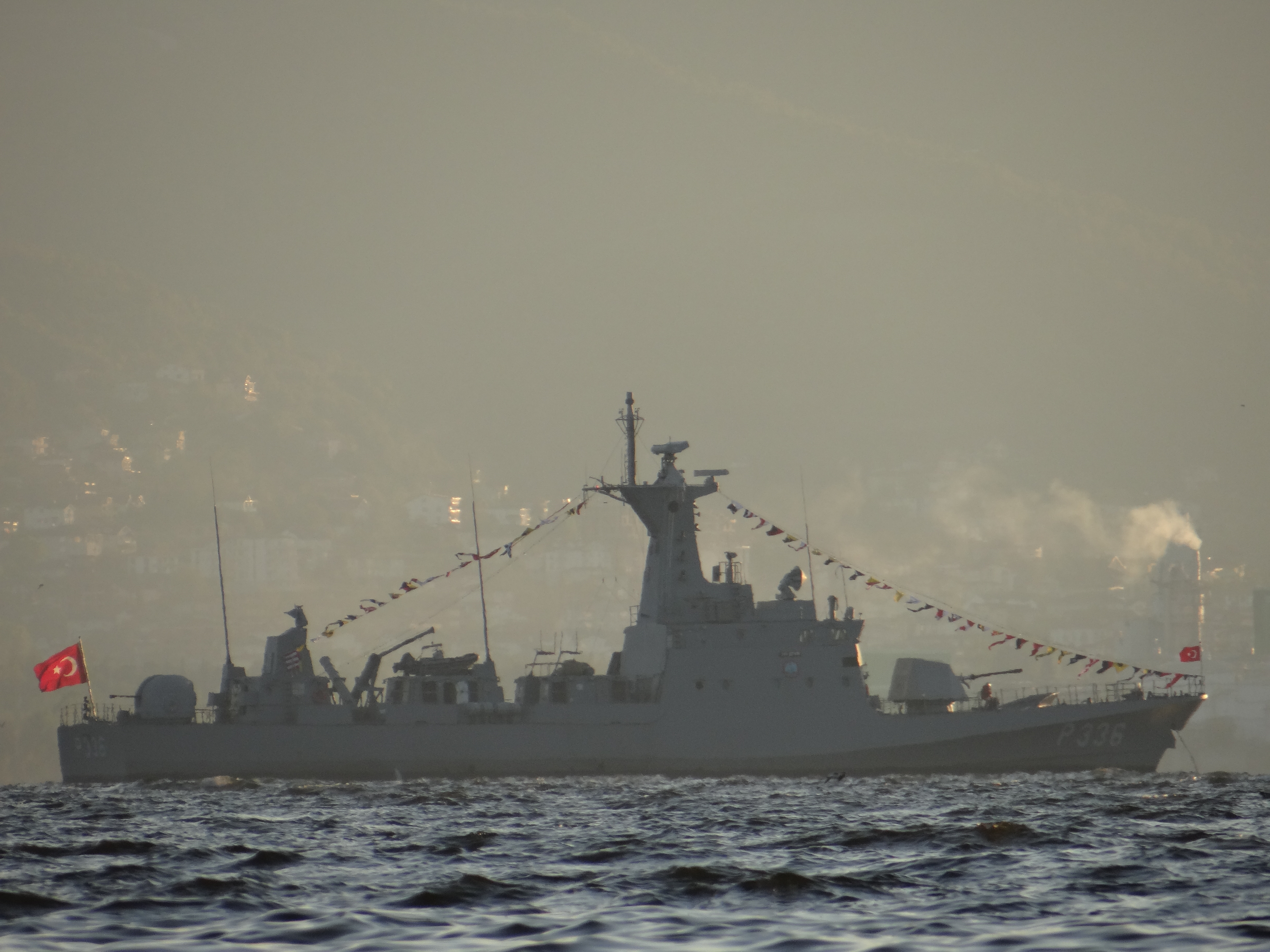
- Kılıç-class ship, TCG Zıpkın (P-336)

Class overview
- Name: Kılıç class
- Builders: Lürssen Werft & Gölcük Naval Shipyard
- Operators: Turkish Naval Forces; Kazakh Naval Forces
- In commission: 1998–present
- Completed: 9
- Active: 9

General characteristics
- Type: Fast attack craft / Missile boat
- Displacement: 552 tonnes (543 long tons)
- Length: 62.4 m (204 ft 9 in)
- Beam: 8.6 m (28 ft 3 in)
- Draught: 2.82 m (9 ft 3 in)
- Propulsion: 4 × MTU diesel engines; 15,120 bhp (11.27 MW); 4 shafts
- Speed: 40 knots (74 km/h; 46 mph)
- Range: 1,050 nmi (1,940 km; 1,210 mi) at 30 kn (56 km/h; 35 mph)
- Complement: 45 (7 Officers , 38 P/O and enlisted)
- Sensors & processing systems: MW-08 3D search radar; STING-EO fire control radar; SCOUT/KH1007 navigation radar
- Electronic warfare & decoys: Cutlass 1C intercept ESM; SRBOC
- Armament: 2 × Harpoon SSM; 1 × Oto Melara 76 mm (3 in) gun; 1 × dual 40 mm (1.6 in) AA gun; 2 × 7.62 mm caliber machine guns

The Kılıç class is one of the fast attack craft / missile boat classes of the Turkish Navy. It is defined as a corvette by Lürssen Werft, the German designer of the vessel.

The ship has a specially developed superstructure & mast for low radar cross-section. It is suitable for operating in the open seas and under bad weather conditions, with the ability to cruise at speeds of up to 24 knots (44 km/h) in Sea State 5.

The first batch of three ships are designated Kılıç I, and the second batch of six ships are designated Kılıç II.

P-330 Kılıç was built in Germany, and the other ships of the class were built in Turkey.

== See also ==
- List of Turkish Navy ships
