= List of ships of the Egyptian Navy =

This is a list of Egyptian Navy ships including all ships of the Egyptian Navy.

The Egyptian Navy is the largest navy in the Middle East and Africa. Since 2013, the Egyptian Navy made a modernization project in which new vessels were acquired from western sources such as the United States, Germany, Italy and France.

== Current and future ships ==
=== Submarines (8) ===
Class	Name	Origin	Image	Type	Quantity	Combat displacement
Type 209(1400) class	S41 (861) S42 (864) S43 (867) S44 (870)	Germany		Attack submarine	4 active	1,600 tons
Type 033 submarine	831 842 852 858	China		Attack submarine	4 active	1,475 tons surfaced 1,830 tons submerged

=== Helicopter Carrier (2) ===
Class	Name	Origin	Image	Type	Quantity	Combat displacement
Mistral-class	Gamal Abdel Nasser (L1010) Anwar El Sadat (L1020)	France		Landing helicopter dock (LHD)	2 active	21,500 tons

=== Frigates (13) ===
Class	Name	Origin	Image	Type	Quantity	Combat displacement
FREMM multipurpose frigate	Tahya Misr (FFG-1001)	France		Multi-purpose & Guided missile frigate	1 active	6,000 tons
FREMM multipurpose frigate	Al-Galala (FFG-1002) Bernees (FFG-1003)	Italy		Multi-purpose & Guided missile frigate	2 active	6,700 tons
(MEKO A200-class)	Al-Aziz (F-904) Al-Qahhar (F-905) Al-Qadeer (F-909) Al-Jabbar (F-910)	Germany Egypt		Multi-purpose & Guided missile frigate	4 active (+2 on order)	3,700 tons
(Oliver Hazard Perry-class)	Sharm El-Sheik (F-901) Toushka (F-906) Alexandria (F-911) Taba (F-916)	United States		Guided missile frigate	4 active	4,200 tons
(Knox-class)	Dumyat (F-961) Rasheed (F-962)	United States		Guided missile frigate	2 active	4,130 tons

=== Corvettes (7) ===
Class	Name	Origin	Image	Type	Quantity	Combat displacement
(Gowind 2500-class)	El-Fateh (971) Port Said (976) El Moez (981) Luxor (986)	France Egypt		Multi-purpose & Guided missile corvette	4 active	2,500 tons
(Descubierta-class)	Abu Qir (F-941) El Suez (F-946)	Spain		Multi-purpose corvette	2 active	1,482 tonnes
(Pohang-class)	Shabab Misr (1000)	South Korea		ASW corvette	1 active	1,220 tonnes

=== Fast Attack Craft (30) ===
Class	Origin	Image	Type	Quantity	Combat displacement
Ezzat (Ambassador Mk III-class)	United States		Fast missile craft	4 active	600 tonnes
Project 12418 (Tarantul-class)	Russia		Fast missile craft	1 active	550 tonnes
October-class	Egypt		Missile boat	6 active	82 tonnes
Osa-class	Soviet Union		Missile boat	8 active	235 tonnes
Ramadan-class	United Kingdom		Missile boat	6 active	317 tonnes
Tiger-class	West Germany		Missile boat	1 active	265 tonnes
Shanghai II-class	China		Gunboat	4 active	135 tonnes

=== Submarine chasers (8) ===
Class	Origin	Image	Type	Quantity	Combat displacement	Ships	Note
Hainan-class submarine chaser	China		Anti-submarine vessel	8	430 tonnes	Al Nour (430)	Armament: Two twin 57 mm AA guns; Two twin 23 mm AA guns; Two triple 12.75-inch (324 mm) torpedo tubes; Four BU-1200 anti-submarine rocket launchers; Two depth-charge mortars; Two depth-charge racks; Mines
Hainan-class submarine chaser	China		Anti-submarine vessel	8	430 tonnes	Al Hadi (433)	Armament: Two twin 57 mm AA guns; Two twin 23 mm AA guns; Two triple 12.75-inch (324 mm) torpedo tubes; Four BU-1200 anti-submarine rocket launchers; Two depth-charge mortars; Two depth-charge racks; Mines
Hainan-class submarine chaser	China		Anti-submarine vessel	8	430 tonnes	Al Hakeem (436)	Armament: Two twin 57 mm AA guns; Two twin 23 mm AA guns; Two triple 12.75-inch (324 mm) torpedo tubes; Four BU-1200 anti-submarine rocket launchers; Two depth-charge mortars; Two depth-charge racks; Mines
Hainan-class submarine chaser	China		Anti-submarine vessel	8	430 tonnes	Al Wakeel (439)	Armament: Two twin 57 mm AA guns; Two twin 23 mm AA guns; Two triple 12.75-inch (324 mm) torpedo tubes; Four BU-1200 anti-submarine rocket launchers; Two depth-charge mortars; Two depth-charge racks; Mines
Hainan-class submarine chaser	China		Anti-submarine vessel	8	430 tonnes	Al Kdar (442)	Armament: Two twin 57 mm AA guns; Two twin 23 mm AA guns; Two triple 12.75-inch (324 mm) torpedo tubes; Four BU-1200 anti-submarine rocket launchers; Two depth-charge mortars; Two depth-charge racks; Mines
Hainan-class submarine chaser	China		Anti-submarine vessel	8	430 tonnes	Al Samad (445)	Armament: Two twin 57 mm AA guns; Two twin 23 mm AA guns; Two triple 12.75-inch (324 mm) torpedo tubes; Four BU-1200 anti-submarine rocket launchers; Two depth-charge mortars; Two depth-charge racks; Mines
Hainan-class submarine chaser	China		Anti-submarine vessel	8	430 tonnes	Al Salam (448)	Armament: Two twin 57 mm AA guns; Two twin 23 mm AA guns; Two triple 12.75-inch (324 mm) torpedo tubes; Four BU-1200 anti-submarine rocket launchers; Two depth-charge mortars; Two depth-charge racks; Mines
Hainan-class submarine chaser	China		Anti-submarine vessel	8	430 tonnes	Al Rafe (451)	Armament: Two twin 57 mm AA guns; Two twin 23 mm AA guns; Two triple 12.75-inch (324 mm) torpedo tubes; Four BU-1200 anti-submarine rocket launchers; Two depth-charge mortars; Two depth-charge racks; Mines

=== Patrol vessels (23) ===
Class	Origin	Image	Type	Quantity	Combat displacement
Cyclone class	United States		Fast patrol craft	3 active	
Type-024 (Hegu-class)	China		Fast patrol craft	4 active	2 in reserve
Shershen-class	Soviet Union		Torpedo boat	4 active	
Project 205 (Osa II-class)	Soviet Union Finland		Patrol boat	4 active	
Kaan 20-class	Turkey		Fast patrol boat	6 active	

=== Mine warfare vessels (17) ===
Class	Origin	Image	Type	Quantity	Combat displacement	Ships	Note
Assiut (T43-class minesweeper)	Soviet Union		Minesweeper	3	460 tonnes	Gharbia (501)	Armament: Two twin 30 mm AA guns; Ten mines
Assiut (T43-class minesweeper)	Soviet Union		Minesweeper	3	460 tonnes	Daqahlia (507)	Armament: Two twin 30 mm AA guns; Ten mines
Assiut (T43-class minesweeper)	Soviet Union		Minesweeper	3	460 tonnes	Baharia (510)	Armament: Two twin 30 mm AA guns; Ten mines
Assiut (T43-class minesweeper)	Soviet Union		Minesweeper	3	460 tonnes	Sinai (513)	Armament: Two twin 30 mm AA guns; Ten mines
Assiut (T43-class minesweeper)	Soviet Union		Minesweeper	3	460 tonnes	Assuit (516)	Armament: Two twin 30 mm AA guns; Ten mines
Aswan (Yurka-class minesweeper)	Soviet Union		Minesweeper	4	569 tonnes	Giza (530)	Armament: Two twin 37 mm AA guns; Four twin 12.7 mm machine guns; Two depth-charge mortars; Mines
Aswan (Yurka-class minesweeper)	Soviet Union		Minesweeper	4	569 tonnes	Aswan (533)	Armament: Two twin 37 mm AA guns; Four twin 12.7 mm machine guns; Two depth-charge mortars; Mines
Aswan (Yurka-class minesweeper)	Soviet Union		Minesweeper	4	569 tonnes	Qena (536)	Armament: Two twin 37 mm AA guns; Four twin 12.7 mm machine guns; Two depth-charge mortars; Mines
Aswan (Yurka-class minesweeper)	Soviet Union		Minesweeper	4	569 tonnes	Sohag (539)	Armament: Two twin 37 mm AA guns; Four twin 12.7 mm machine guns; Two depth-charge mortars; Mines
Dhat Al Sawari-class	United States	—	Minesweeper	3	203 tonnes	Dhat Al Sawari	Armament: Two 12.7 mm machineguns
Dhat Al Sawari-class	United States	—	Minesweeper	3	203 tonnes	Navarine	Armament: Two 12.7 mm machineguns
Dhat Al Sawari-class	United States	—	Minesweeper	3	203 tonnes	Al Burullus	Armament: Two 12.7 mm machineguns
Al Siddiq (Osprey-class minehunter)	United States		Minesweeper	2	904 tonnes	Al Farouk (534)	The vessels are to receive in-country modernization and technical Support, including the supply of new L3 Machinery Control Systems. Armament: Two 12.7 mm machine guns
Al Siddiq (Osprey-class minehunter)	United States		Minesweeper	2	904 tonnes	Al Seddiq (521)	The vessels are to receive in-country modernization and technical Support, including the supply of new L3 Machinery Control Systems. Armament: Two 12.7 mm machine guns
Safaga-class	United States	—	Survey vessel	2	165 tonnes	Safaga	—
Safaga-class	United States	—	Survey vessel	2	165 tonnes	Abu El Ghosn	—

=== Landing crafts (15) ===
Class	Origin	Image	Type	Quantity	Combat displacement	Ships	Note
Vydra-class landing ship	Soviet Union		Landing craft mechanized	9	600 tonnes	330	Armament: Two twin 40 mm AA guns
Vydra-class landing ship	Soviet Union		Landing craft mechanized	9	600 tonnes	332	Armament: Two twin 40 mm AA guns
Vydra-class landing ship	Soviet Union		Landing craft mechanized	9	600 tonnes	334	Armament: Two twin 40 mm AA guns
Vydra-class landing ship	Soviet Union		Landing craft mechanized	9	600 tonnes	336	Armament: Two twin 40 mm AA guns
Vydra-class landing ship	Soviet Union		Landing craft mechanized	9	600 tonnes	338	Armament: Two twin 40 mm AA guns
Vydra-class landing ship	Soviet Union		Landing craft mechanized	9	600 tonnes	340	Armament: Two twin 40 mm AA guns
Vydra-class landing ship	Soviet Union		Landing craft mechanized	9	600 tonnes	342	Armament: Two twin 40 mm AA guns
Vydra-class landing ship	Soviet Union		Landing craft mechanized	9	600 tonnes	344	Armament: Two twin 40 mm AA guns
Vydra-class landing ship	Soviet Union		Landing craft mechanized	9	600 tonnes	346	Armament: Two twin 40 mm AA guns
EDA-R-class landing craft	France		Landing craft tank	2	300 tonnes	GN 011	Armament: two 12.7 mm machine guns; two 7.62 mm machine guns.
EDA-R-class landing craft	France		Landing craft tank	2	300 tonnes	AS 021	Armament: two 12.7 mm machine guns; two 7.62 mm machine guns.
CTM-NG-class landing craft	France		Landing craft mechanized	4	GN 012	150 tonnes	
CTM-NG-class landing craft	France		Landing craft mechanized	4	GN 013	150 tonnes	
CTM-NG-class landing craft	France		Landing craft mechanized	4	AS 022	150 tonnes	
CTM-NG-class landing craft	France		Landing craft mechanized	4	AS 023	150 tonnes	

=== Support ships (6) ===
Class	Origin	Image	Type	Quantity	Combat displacement	Ships	Note
Fort Rosalie-class replenishment ship	United Kingdom		Replenishment ship	2	23,482 tonnes	Abu Simbel I(233)	Armament: - 2 Phalanx CIWS 20 mm automatic cannon for close combat; - 2 20 mm cannon; - 4 7.62 mm machine guns
Fort Rosalie-class replenishment ship	United Kingdom		Replenishment ship	2	23,482 tonnes	Abu Simbel II	Armament: - 2 Phalanx CIWS 20 mm automatic cannon for close combat; - 2 20 mm cannon; - 4 7.62 mm machine guns
Westerwald-class transport ship	Germany		Ammunition ship	1	3,469 tonnes	Halayib (231)	—
Lüneburg-class replenishment ship Type 701E	Germany		Replenishment ship	1	3,680 tonnes	Shalatin (230)	Armament: Two 40 mm 70-caliber Bofors AA
Poluchat-II-class torpedo retriever	Soviet Union	—	Torpedo retriever	2	95 tonnes	—	—

=== Fuel tankers (8) ===
Class	Origin	Type	Quantity	Combat displacement	Ships
Toplivo II-class tanker	Soviet Union	Coastal tanker	8	1,200 tonnes	Maryut (211)
Toplivo II-class tanker	Soviet Union	Coastal tanker	8	1,200 tonnes	Al Furat (212)
Toplivo II-class tanker	Soviet Union	Coastal tanker	8	1,200 tonnes	Al Nil (213)
Toplivo II-class tanker	Soviet Union	Coastal tanker	8	1,200 tonnes	Ekdu (214)
Toplivo II-class tanker	Soviet Union	Coastal tanker	8	1,200 tonnes	Atbarah (215)
Toplivo II-class tanker	Soviet Union	Coastal tanker	8	1,200 tonnes	Aida 3 (216)
Toplivo II-class tanker	Soviet Union	Coastal tanker	8	1,200 tonnes	Al Manzalla (217)
Toplivo II-class tanker	Soviet Union	Coastal tanker	8	1,200 tonnes	Al Burulus (218)

=== Tugboats (7) ===
Class	Origin	Type	Quantity	Combat displacement	Ships
Okhtenskiy-class oceangoing tug	Egypt; United States	Tugboat	5	940 tonnes	El Max (103)
Okhtenskiy-class oceangoing tug	Egypt; United States	Tugboat	5	940 tonnes	El Agamy (105)
Okhtenskiy-class oceangoing tug	Egypt; United States	Tugboat	5	940 tonnes	El Kantara (107)
Okhtenskiy-class oceangoing tug	Egypt; United States	Tugboat	5	940 tonnes	El Dekheila (109)
Okhtenskiy-class oceangoing tug	Egypt; United States	Tugboat	5	940 tonnes	El Eskandarany (111)
Natick-class harbor tug	Egypt; United States	Tugboat	2	560 tonnes	—
Natick-class harbor tug	Egypt; United States	Tugboat	2	560 tonnes	—

=== Miscellaneous vessels ===
Class	Origin	Image	Type	Quantity	Combat displacement	Ships	Note	
El Mahrousa super yacht	United Kingdom		Presidential yacht and ceremonial ship	1	3,762 tonnes	El Mahrousa	—	
Black Swan-class sloop	United Kingdom		Training ship	1	1,490 tonnes	Tariq (F931)	Armament: 6 × QF 4 in (102 mm) Mk XVI AA guns (3 × 2); 4 × 2-pounder AA pom-pom; 4 × 0.5-inch (12.7 mm) AA machine guns (original); 12 × 20 mm Oerlikon AA (6 × 2) (modified); Depth charges 40 (110 modified)	
Intisar training ship		—	Training ship	1	1,000 tonnes	—	—	
El Kousseir yacht	—	—	Training ship	Presidential yacht	1	500 tonnes	—	—

== Egyptian Coast Guard ==
The Egyptian Coast Guard is responsible for the onshore protection of public installations near the coast and the patrol of coastal waters to prevent smuggling.

=== Patrol boats ===
- 22 Timsah I/II class
- 12 Sea Spectre PB Mk III class
- 9 Swiftships class
- 6 MV70 class
- 5 P-6 (Project 183) class
- 3 Textron class

=== Patrol crafts ===
- 25 Swiftships 26m class
- 16 SR.N6 class
- 9 Type 83 class
- 6 Crestitalia class
- 12 Spectre class
- 12 Peterson class
- 5 Nisr class
- 29 DC-30 class
- 3 of 6 MRTP-20 Yonka Onuk MRTP-20 class

== See also ==
- List of Egyptian sail frigates
