= List of Egyptian sail frigates =

This is a list of Egyptian sail frigates during the Age of Sail, from the middle of the 17th century (when the type emerged) until the close of the sailing era in the middle of the 19th century. They were built in Alexandria, Marseille, Venice or Trieste in the period 1640-1870.

== List ==
=== Sail frigates ===
- Guerriere/Murchid-i-Djihad 60 - Ran aground during the Battle of Navarino and later scuttled, 1827
- Ihsania 64 - Blew up during the Battle of Navarino, 1827
- Leone 60 - Damaged during the Battle of Navarino, 1827, refloated, renamed Sir Djihad
- Souriya 56 - Ran aground and sank during the Battle of Navarino, 1827
- l'Egyptienne 60 - Renamed Raschid
- Kafr-el-Cheyk 58 - Wrecked 1840
- Damiat 52 (c.1829) - Sunk in the Battle of Sinop, 1853
- Menousich 60
- Bahira 60

=== Sail frigates surrendered by Turkey in 1839 and returned in 1840 ===
- Nousratie 74
- Sourie 60
- Chadie 60
- Elzraman 60
- Nesamie 50
- Nouhan Bahari 50
- M'sian Zafer 50
- Chabal Bahari 50
- Nassim Zafer 40
- Fazl Illah 40 (ex-Russian Rafail 44, captured 1829)

=== Steam frigates ===
- Mehemet Ali laid up 1880
- Ibrahim (1868) - BU c. 1890

== See also ==
- Ancient Egyptian navy
- Ptolemaic Egyptian navy
- Egyptian Fatimid navy
- Egyptian Tulunid navy
- Egyptian Navy

== Bibliography ==
- Caruana, Joseph & Silverstone, Paul H. (1988). "Question 47/87". Warship International. XXVI (2): 196–197. ISSN 0043-0374.
