= Baharia =

Baharia may refer to:

- Baharia, Bangladesh
- Baharia, Sicily
- Bahariya, an oasis in Egypt
- Camp Baharia
- Baharia (510), a T43-class minesweeper of the Egyptian Navy

== See also ==
- Bahari (disambiguation)
