= Road to Eilat =

- Arabic: الطريق إلى إيلات
- Directed by: Inaam Mohammed Ali
- Written by: Fayez Ghaly
- Produced by: Mamdouh El Leithy
- Starring: Salah Zulfikar; Ezzat El Alaili; Nabil Al-Halfawi
- Cinematography: Sobhi Basta
- Edited by: Kamal Abu El Ela
- Music by: Yasser Abdel Rahman
- Production company: Egyptian Television Network
- Distributed by: Egyptian Television Network
- Release date: 1994
- Running time: 156 minutes
- Country: Egypt
- Language: Egyptian Arabic

Road to Eilat (Arabic: الطريق إلى إيلات, translit: Al-Tareek Ela Eilat or El Tareeq Ela Eilat aliases: The Road to Eilat) is a 1994 Egyptian war film directed by Inaam Mohammed Ali and features Salah Zulfikar in a special appearance as Rear Admiral Mahmoud Fahmy, the commander of Egyptian Navy. The film stars Ezzat El Alaili and Nabil Al-Halfawi. The film is Salah Zulfikar's final film role.

== Plot ==
The film takes place during the War of Attrition in 1969, before the October War, specifically in July. The film deals with the Egyptian raids on the Israeli port of Eilat, operations carried out by a group of frogmen belonging to the Egyptian Navy, when they attacked the Eilat War Port and were able to destroy two warships: Beit Sheva, Bat Yam and the war pier (the two ships were attacking the Egyptian positions in the Red Sea after the Israeli forces took over the Sinai), then the return of these frogs safely after completing their mission successfully, after the martyrdom of one hero.

== Film crew ==
- Screenplay: Fayez Ghaly
- Directed by: Inaam Muhammad Ali
- Produced by: Production Sector Egyptian Television
- Producer: Mamdouh El-Leithy
- Producers:
  - Muhammad Khamis
  - Emad El-Sheikh
  - Muhammad Tawfiq
  - Ali Mahmoud
  - Ahmed Hamid
- Music score: Yasser Abdel Rahman
- Palestinian dialect references: Majeh Badrakhan
- Hebrew dialect references: Tawheed Majdi
- Makeup:
  - Ramadan Imam
  - Imam Ramadan
  - Muhammad Ramadan
- Hairdresser: Mamdouh Omar
- Clothes: Ahmed Salem
- Accessory: Amin Mostafa
- Executors of the decor:
  - Muhammad Al-Boushi
  - Muhammad Zaki
  - Sayed Amin
  - Ahmed Othman
  - Sharif Al-Salami
  - Abdel Hamid Abdel Fattah
  - Tariq Al-Boushi
  - Ibrahim Harb
  - Mohamed Abdel-Alim
  - Ahmed Abdel-Gawad
  - Salah Abu Al-Majd
  - Hassan Ali Hassan
  - Saad Ali Esawy
  - Muhammad Tammam Al-Bushy
  - Mahmoud Hassan
  - Mohamed Abdel-Sabour
- Voice recorder
  - Adeeb Fouad
  - Ahmed Abdel Khaleq
- Assistant Mixing: Hiam Mohamed
- Photography: Sobhi Basta
- Clacket: Ibrahim Bayoumi
- Registrar: Mohsen Abdelazim

=== Military Experts ===
- Retired Major General Ibrahim Dakhakhni
- Retired Admiral Mustafa Taher

=== From the Navy ===
- Rear Admiral: Farouk Mohsab
- Commodore: Nabawi Shalaby
- Admiral: Abdel Azim Tawash
- Naval Colonel: Mustafa Abdel-Raouf Al-Haw
- Marine Major: Ashraf Mohamed
- Naval Captain: Mohamed Sharif, Military Training Supervisor

== Cast ==
=== Primary cast ===
- Salah Zulfikar as Rear Admiral Mahmoud Fahmy, Commander of the Egyptian Navy
- Ezzat El Alaili as Colonel Radi, commander of the operation
- Nabil Al-Halfawi as Colonel Mahmoud, the training commander
- Mohamed El-Dafrawi as Chief of staff of the Egyptian Army Forces
- Mohamed Abdel-Gawad as Captain Hatim
- Hisham Abdullah as Staff Sergeant Navy Alish
- Nasir Saif as Rear naval lieutenant
- Abdullah Mahmoud as Martyr Marine Sergeant Morsi Al-Zanati
- Hani Kamal as Lieutenant Marine Hussain
- Mohamed Saad as Sergeant Qenawyi
- Alaa Morsi as Samir, boat maintenance engineer
- Tariq Al-Nahry as Galal from the Auxiliary Group
- Farouk Aita as Fawaz from the Supporting Group
- Suleiman Eid as Salem, desert guide
- Madeleine Tabar as Maryam, one of the guides
- Medhat Morsi as Director of Egyptian Military Intelligence
- Yousry Mustafa as Operation Officer in Jordan

=== Supporting cast ===
- Amin Hashem as employee responsible for Egyptian Radio
- Sherine Wagdy as Captain Mahmoud's wife
- Nahed Rushdie as Captain Radi's wife
- Alan Zoghby as Israeli officer
- Muhammad Mahmoud as Abu Jihad, a Palestinian fighter
- Tariq Al-Amir
- Ibrahim Balousha
- Muhammad Ammar
- Youssef Hussein
- Muhammad Safwat
- Tawheed Magdy
- Magdy Suleiman

== See also ==
- Salah Zulfikar filmography
- List of Egyptian films of 1994
