= Mahmoud Abdel Rahman Fahmy =

Egyptian politician and admiral (1929–2006)

Rear Admiral Mahmoud Abdel Rahman Fahmy
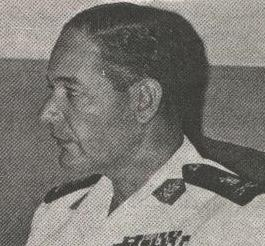
- Born: September 28, 1929
- Died: April 28, 2006 (aged 76)
- Rank: Rear Admiral
- Commands: Commander of the Naval Forces of Egypt; Vice Defense Minister; Minister of the Egyptian Naval Transport

Rear Admiral Mahmoud Abdel Rahman Fahmy (Arabic: محمود عبدالرحمن فهمي; September 28, 1929 – April 28, 2006), was commander of the Egyptian Naval Forces (September 1969 to October 1972) and vice defense minister from 12 February 1972 to October 24, 1972. He later served as the first consultant for naval affairs to the president of the Republic of Egypt (Anwar Al Sadat), chief executive officer of the General Egyptian Organization for Naval Transport, chief executive officer of the Egyptian Overseas Navigation Company, board member of the Transport and Communication Sector of the Egyptian National Council for Production, minister of the Egyptian Naval Transport, and consultant to the Middle East International Naval Organization.

He graduated from the Egyptian Naval Academy in 1948 as a second lieutenant and served on various types of naval vessels from 1949 to 1965 before being appointed as head of the Battle Training Sector with the rank of staff naval commodore and subsequently as rear admiral (1969).

Fahmy became the seventh commander of the Egyptian Naval Forces on September 12, 1969, succeeding Vice Admiral Fouad Abu Zikry, who served his first term as commander from June 11, 1967, to September 11, 1969.

== See also ==
- Lists of Egyptians
- Abu Zikry
- Egyptian navy
