= Madeleine Tabar =

Lebanese actress (born 1958)

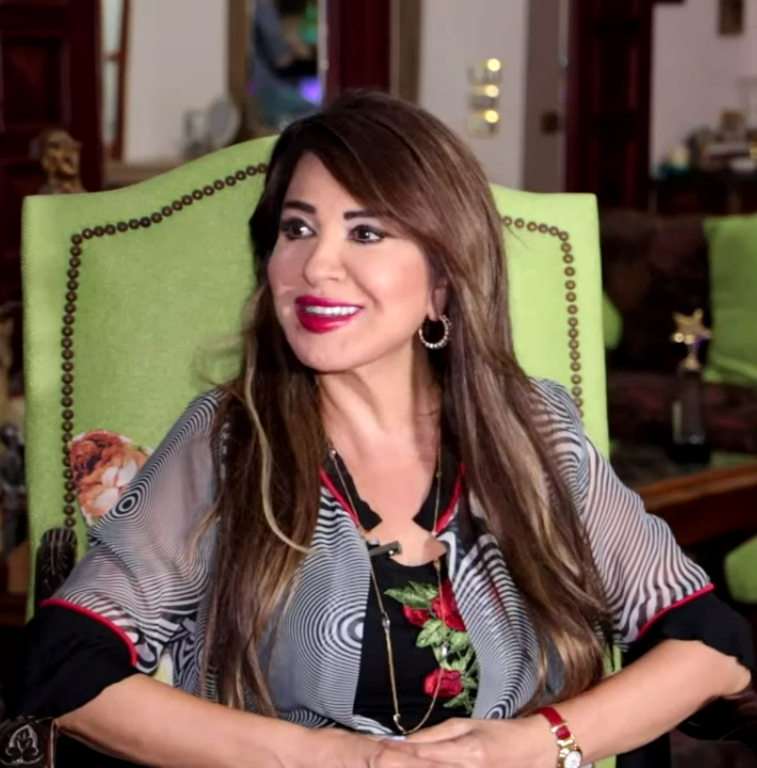
- Born: 26 February 1958 (age 68); Beirut, Lebanon
- Occupation: Actress
- Years active: 1982–present

Madeleine Tabar (Arabic: مادلين طبر) (born 26 February 1958) is a Lebanese actress. She appeared in Road to Eilat (1994).

== Biography ==
Tabar was born in Beirut on 26 February 1958. She studied Public Relations and Advertising at the Lebanese University. She began her work on radio and television in Lebanon before acting in Egypt and the Arab world.

Tabar was one of the personalities who participated in the cultural project "Egypt in the eyes of the world" at the invitation of the Embassy of Lebanon in Egypt.

Tabar has worked on television in Egypt. She speaks French.

== Film ==
Titles translated from Arabic

Road to Eilat	1994

== Television series ==
Titles translated from Arabic

The Women's Game	1982
Quick Lubna	1988
Calimero	1992
The Bridge	1997
Dignitaries	2004
