= El Mahrousa =

Historic presidential yacht of Egypt

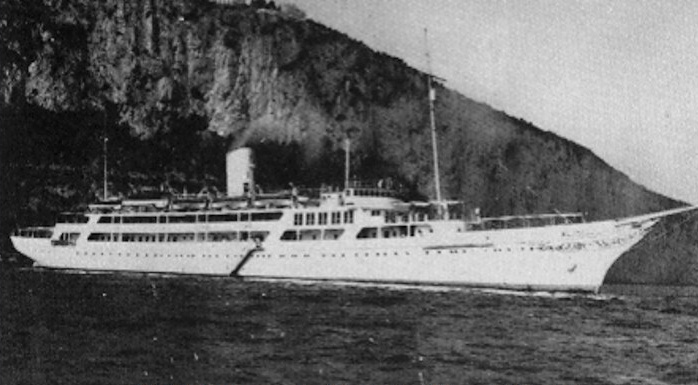
- El Mahrousa as Egypt's royal yacht, c. 1940

History

Egypt
- Name: El Mahrousa
- Builder: Samuda Brothers, Cubitt Town, London
- Laid down: 1863
- Launched: 1865
- Reclassified: Rebuilt 1951 and became a naval training vessel
- Status: Active

General characteristics
- Tonnage: 4,561 GT
- Displacement: 3,762 tons
- Length: 146 m (478 ft); Lengthened in 1872 by 12 m (40 ft); In 1905 lengthened by a further 16 ft 5 in (5.00 m)
- Beam: 13 m (43 ft)
- Draught: 5.3 m (17 ft 5 in)
- Propulsion: Steam turbine, 3 screw propellers, 6,500 hp (4,800 kW)
- Speed: 16 knots (30 km/h) maximum; 13 knots (24 km/h) cruise
- Crew: 160

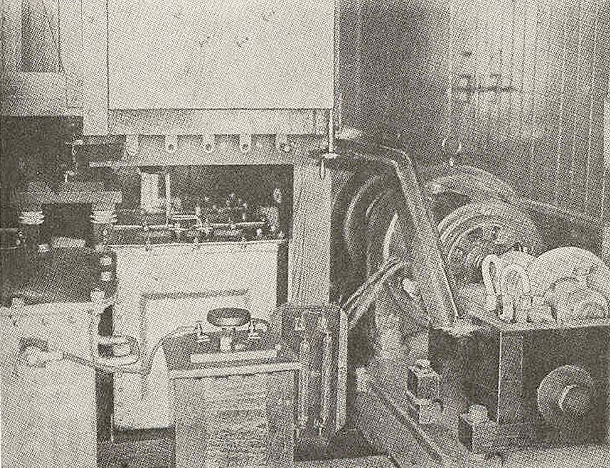
A wireless telegraph was installed in 1912

El Mahrousa (Arabic: المحروسة, literally "The Protected"), officially renamed for a period of time as El Horreya (Arabic: الحرية, "Freedom"), is a super yacht that serves as Egypt's presidential yacht, and previously served as the country's royal yacht. She was built by the British ship building firm Samuda Brothers in 1863 to the order of Egyptian Khedive Ismail Pasha and was handed over to its crew two years later.

El Mahrousa underwent a number of important alterations during its years of service, including the replacement of her paddle wheel engines by turbine driven propellers in 1905; the installation of a wireless telegraph in 1912 and a diesel-fueled system in 1919; as well as multiple-feet lengthenings throughout that period. She also witnessed much of Egypt's modern history since she was first commissioned in the 19th century up till now. The yacht carried three Egyptian rulers to their exile abroad, namely Khedive Ismail, Khedive Abbas II and King Farouk I, along with the latter's recently born son, Fuad II, the last ruling members of the Muhammad Ali dynasty. This marked the end of the monarchy in Egypt following the 1952 revolution and the founding of the Republic of Egypt, after which the yacht joined the Egyptian Navy and was renamed El Horreya (English: Liberty).

The yacht continued to play a role in the country's post-revolutionary history and participated in the 1976 United States Bicentennial celebrations. She took Egypt's president, Gamal Abdel Nasser, to numerous locations and she notably sailed with President Anwar Sadat to Jaffa, Israel, during the 1979 peace talks between Egypt and Israel. She was renamed back to El Mahrousa in 2000 and became the first ship to cross the New Suez Canal extension in 2015.

== History ==
She was designed by Oliver Lang along the same lines as HMY Victoria and Albert, and built by the Samuda Brothers on the River Thames.

In 1867, the ship embarked on its first trip, in which it transported Egyptian troops to aid the Ottomans during the Cretan revolt. Two years later, Khedive Ismail Pasha used the ship to go on a tour to invite royals of Europe to attend the inauguration of the Suez Canal.

After the 1952 abdication of King Farouk and his arrival in Europe he sent back the yacht to Egypt with all the crew and the equipment; she was taken over by the Egyptian government for use as a naval training ship, and her name was changed to El Horreya. She spent most of her career in the eastern Mediterranean, but did participate in the International Naval Review held to commemorate the bicentennial of the United States of America.

Other notable figures who boarded the ship were Mohammad Reza Pahlavi, King Ibn Saud, Josip Broz Tito, and Menachem Begin.

In 1984, its title as the largest super yacht was taken by Prince Abdulaziz, after having retained it for 119 years. It is the oldest active super yacht in the world and the eleventh largest in 2023.

The ship is cared for by the Egyptian Navy, and is occasionally used as a Presidential Yacht. The ship goes to sea about three times a year, usually for just a day.

On 10 September 2000 after visiting the El Horreya, President Hosni Mubarak changed the name back to her original name El Mahrousa.

On 6 August 2015, the ship was used to inaugurate the New Suez Canal.

== Alterations ==
Twice in the ship's history significant alterations to the ship's length were carried out. Firstly by 12 metres (40 ft) in 1872, with a further 5.0 metres (16.5 ft) being added in 1905. The 1905 rebuild was undertaken at the Pointhouse Shipyard of A & J Inglis in Glasgow, Scotland and included the replacement of her two paddle wheels with triple propellers powered by steam turbines built by Inglis at their Warroch Street Engine Works in Glasgow. Inglis were one of the first companies to be granted a license by the Parsons Marine Steam Turbine Company, Wallsend for the construction of steam turbines in their own works.

== See also ==
- List of motor yachts by length
