= Fouad Mohamed Abou Zikry =

Egyptian admiral

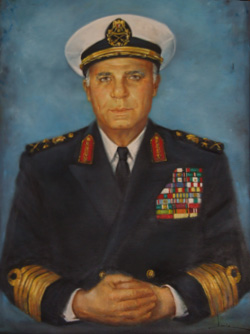
- Admiral Zikry, 1976
- Born: Fouad Mohammad Abou-Zikry; November 17, 1923
- Died: January 26, 1983 (aged 59)
- Children: Azza Fouad Abou Zikry (son)
- Military career
- Allegiance: Kingdom of Egypt; Republic of Egypt; United Arab Republic
- Branch: Egyptian Navy
- Service years: 1946–1983
- Rank: Admiral (active) Field Marshal (Honorary)
- Unit: 3rd Expeditionary Frigates
- Commands: 2nd Missile Boats Brigade; Damietta Naval Base; Mediterranean Fleet; Egyptian Navy
- Conflicts: 1948 Arab-Israeli War; Suez Crisis; Six-Day War; War of Attrition; Yom Kippur War

Admiral Fouad Mohamed Abou Zikry (Arabic: فؤاد محمد ابوذكري; November 17, 1923 – January 26, 1983) was an Egyptian naval officer and the Commander-in-Chief of the Egyptian Navy during the Six-Day War, War of Attrition and Yom Kippur War. He was also Vice Defense Minister from 12 February 1972 to October 29, 1973, and later served as an Advisor of Naval Affairs to the Egyptian president Anwar Al Sadat. He remains the only Egyptian Navy officer to have held the ranks of both Admiral and Field Marshal in the history of the Egyptian Armed Forces.

== Cultural depictions ==
- Abu Zikry was portrayed by Egyptian actor Salah Zulfikar in the 1994 war film Road To Eilat (Al-Tareek Ela Eilat).

== Gallery ==
Egyptian Navy Ensign and Jack

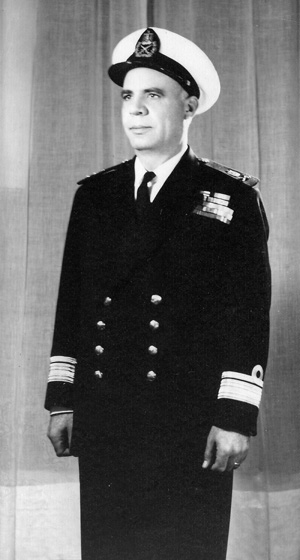
Admiral Fouad M. Abou Zikry in 1969.

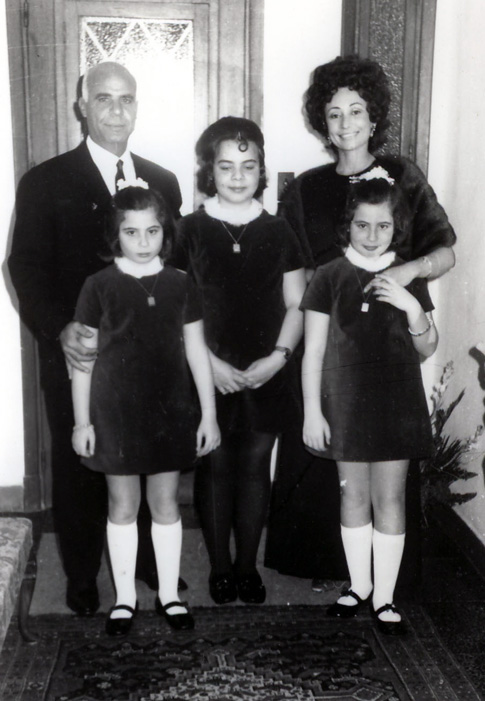
Family Photo on 14 Feb 1971.

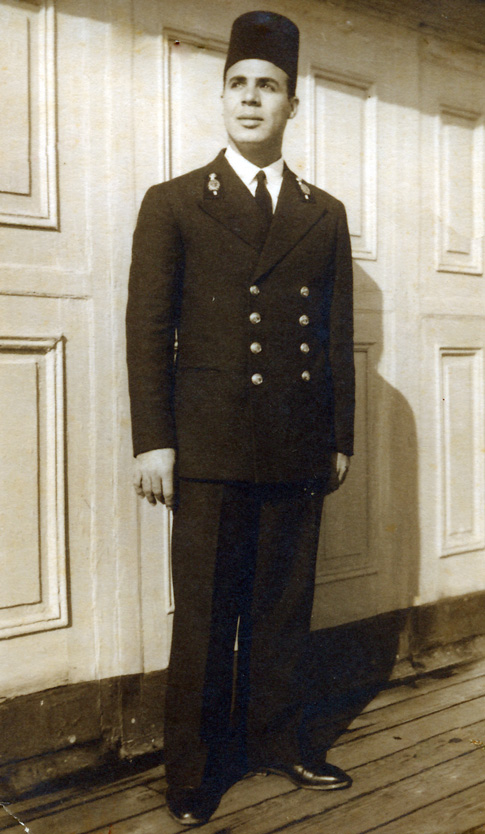
Upon graduation in 1944.

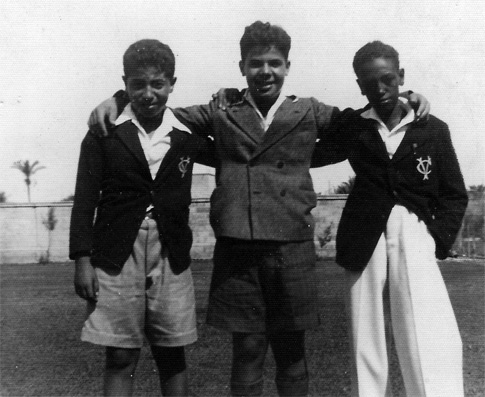
Admiral Fouad Abou Zikry in Victoria College (middle), Alexandria Egypt, circa 1933.

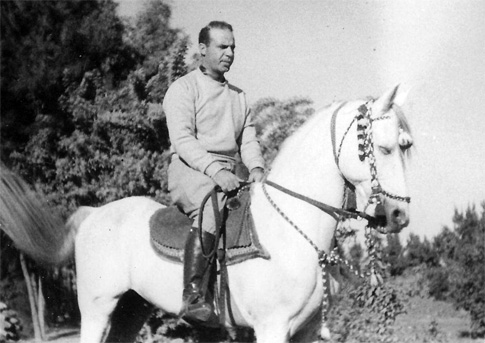
Riding on horseback 1962.
