= Egyptian frigate Mehemet Ali =

Steam frigate of the navy of the Khedivate of Egypt

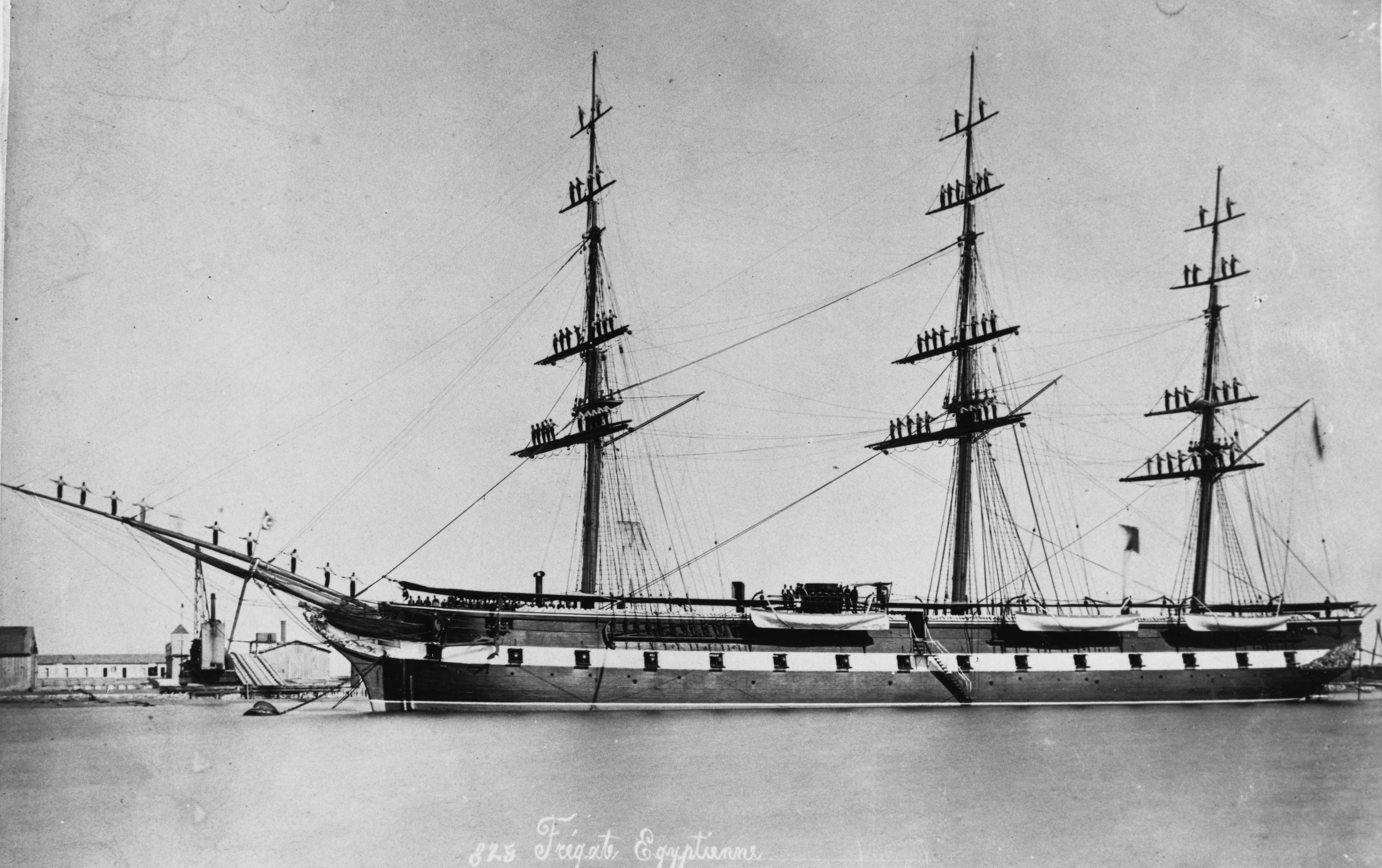
- Mehemet Ali with masts ceremonially manned. Probably pictured in harbour at Port Said or Alexandria.

History

Egypt
- Name: Mehemet Ali
- Namesake: Muhammad Ali of Egypt
- Launched: Circa 1860
- Out of service: Laid up December 1880
- Fate: Hulked by 1898

General characteristics
- Type: Frigate
- Displacement: 1,735 tons
- Length: 290 feet (88.4 m)
- Beam: 36 feet (11.0 m)
- Draught: 16 feet (4.9 m)
- Propulsion: 800 nominal horsepower
- Armament: 20x Krupp 4.7 inch guns; 10x 40-pounder breach loading guns
- Armour: Iron

Mehemet Ali was a steam frigate of the navy of the Khedivate of Egypt. She was probably built in England and was launched circa 1860. Mehemet Ali deployed to Port Said in 1874 to support Egyptian Army forces under General Charles Pomeroy Stone during a dispute with the Suez Canal Company. She served as an escort to troopships during the 1877 Russo-Turkish War and was laid up in 1880.

== Design and construction ==
Mehemet Ali was built circa 1860, probably in England. She was named after Muhammad Ali of Egypt, who ruled Egypt from 1805 to 1848. Mehemet Ali displaced 1,735 tons and was propelled by three masts and a steam engine of 800 nominal horsepower. She was 290 feet (88.4 m) long, with a beam of 36 feet (11.0 m) and a depth in the hold of 16 feet (4.9 m). She was armed with 20x Krupp 4.7-inch guns and 10x 40-pounder breech loading guns and was iron-hulled.

== Service ==
In October 1864 Mehemet Ali carried the wife of Isma'il Pasha, viceroy of Egypt, from the Bosphorus to Alexandria. Mehemet Ali was posted to Port Said in April 1874 to support forces, under General Charles Pomeroy Stone of the Egyptian Army, mobilised because of a dispute over tolls between the Khedive and the Suez Canal Company. The affair ended with the company accepting the new, lower toll rates.

On 19 January 1877 Mehemet Ali was in harbour at Constantinople when the British merchant steamship Joseph Love was driven onto her by the wind. The Joseph Love sank with the loss of one of her crew member drowned. Some 12 crewmen scrambled onto the Mehemet Ali and were aided by her crew; the remaining eight crew of the Joseph Love, including her captain, escaped by ship's boat. The Egyptians provided dinner to the shipwrecked men before they were handed over to a Royal Navy ship. Mehemet Ali was damaged badly at her bow and, having taken on a large quantity of water, was beached on the Kourou-tehesmé Shoal to save her from sinking.

The Mehemet Ali helped escort transports carrying Egyptian forces to the Russo-Turkish War in 1877. By this time, she was described by one former navy officer as "as much good as a cardboard box". Mehemet Ali was laid up in December 1880.

== Fate ==
Mehemet Ali had her machinery removed from her in around 1890 and was employed as a stationary guardship at Alexandria. She was discarded around 1898.
