= Suleiman Ezzat =

Egyptian admiral

- Ezzat in 1967
- Born: April 16, 1910; Cairo, Egypt
- Died: July 25, 1970 (aged 60); Cairo, Egypt
- Military career
- Allegiance: Kingdom of Egypt; Republic of Egypt; United Arab Republic
- Branch: (Egypt) Egyptian Navy
- Rank: Admiral (active)
- Conflicts: 1948 Arab–Israeli War; Suez Crisis; Six-Day War

Suleiman Ezzat (سليمان عزت; 16 April 1910 – 25 July 1970) was an Egyptian naval officer and the Commander-in-Chief of the Egyptian Navy, which he led from September 1952 till 10 June 1967 when he resigned after the Six-Day War.

Ezzat participated in the 1948 Arab–Israeli War and is said to have bombarded the Tel Aviv port in October 1948 in retaliation for Israel's targeting of an Egyptian ship docked in the port of Gaza. In 1954, he was responsible for the Committee for the Liberation of the Arab Maghreb, which was headed by Allal El Fassi and Mohammed Khider, and which was coordinating the actions of the ALN during the Algerian War of Independence.

A missile boat (Ambassador MK III) operated by the Egyptian Navy since 2013 was named after him.
