= Sherine Wagdy =

Egyptian singer

Sherine Wagdy شيرين وجدي
- Born: Sherine Farouk Salem; 28 March 1969 (age 56); Cairo, Egypt
- Genres: Arabic, Music of Egypt
- Occupation: singer

Sherine Wagdy (Arabic: شيرين وجدي) (born as Sherine Farouk Salem (Arabic: شيرين فاروق سالم), born 28 March 1969 in Cairo, Egypt) is an Egyptian singer who appeared in Road to Eilat (1994).

== Albums ==
- Romeo w Juliet
- Enta El Nos El Helw
- Saddaqny
- Maqdarshy
- Law Benna Eih
- Wala Leila
- Kol Da
- Layaly Hayaty

== Singles ==
- Erga3ly
- Law Benna Eih
- Lafeit Belad Allah (featuring Guitara Band)
- Wala Leila
- W Da Yerdy Min
- El Badr
- Kol Da
- Ana Ba2a
- Law Youm Bey3ady
