= Ancient navies and vessels =

Ancient navies had a large impact on the navies of today. The outcomes of battles between ancient navies have been studied by the military to learn tactics that would help in their conquests. The ships that these civilizations created were what many ship designs were based on and allowed the vessels to become better built. The Punic Wars are some of the most notorious wars in history, and the naval vessels and tactics used in all three became a major part of naval military history.

== Egyptian Navy ==
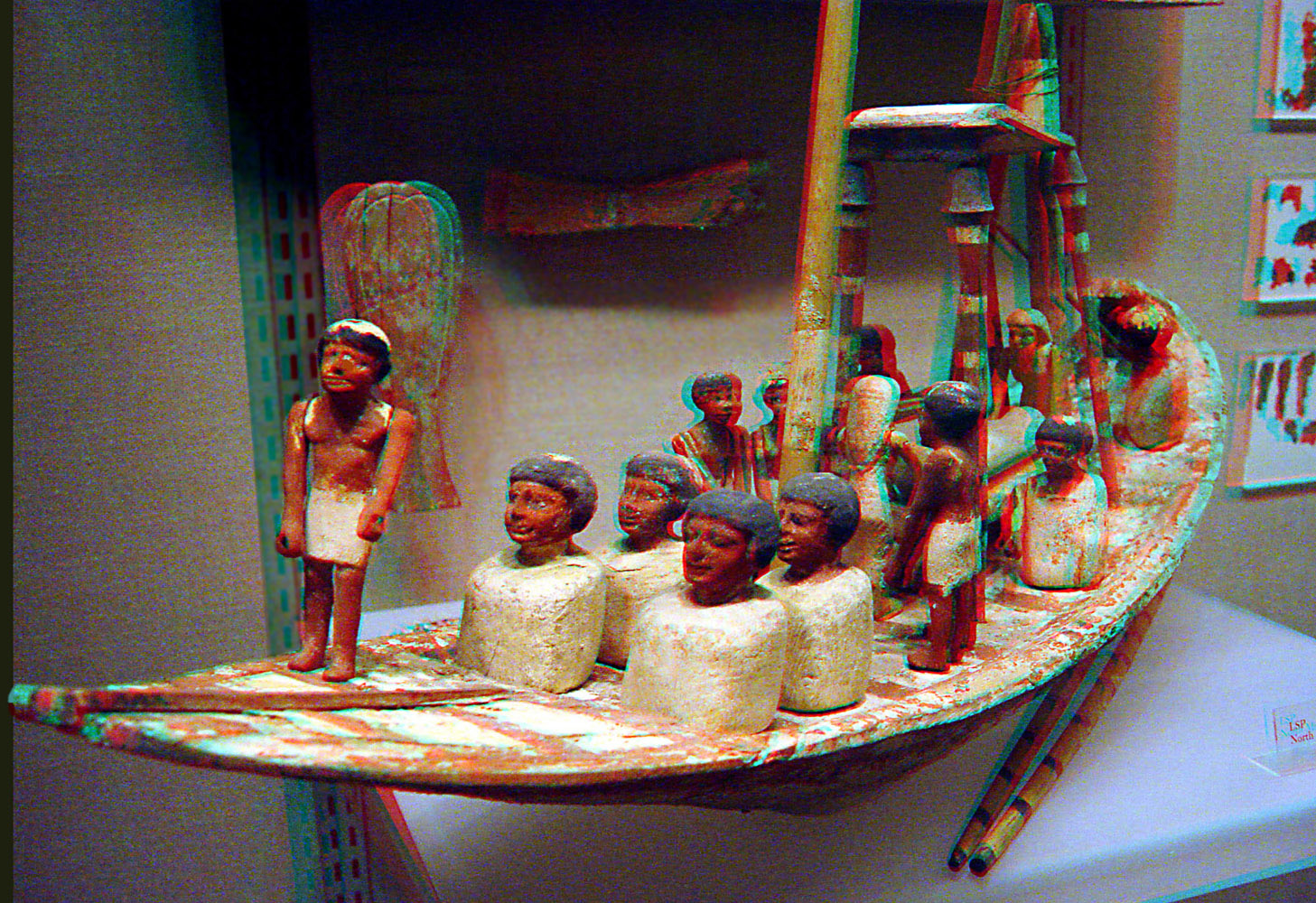
Model of Ancient Egyptian ship.

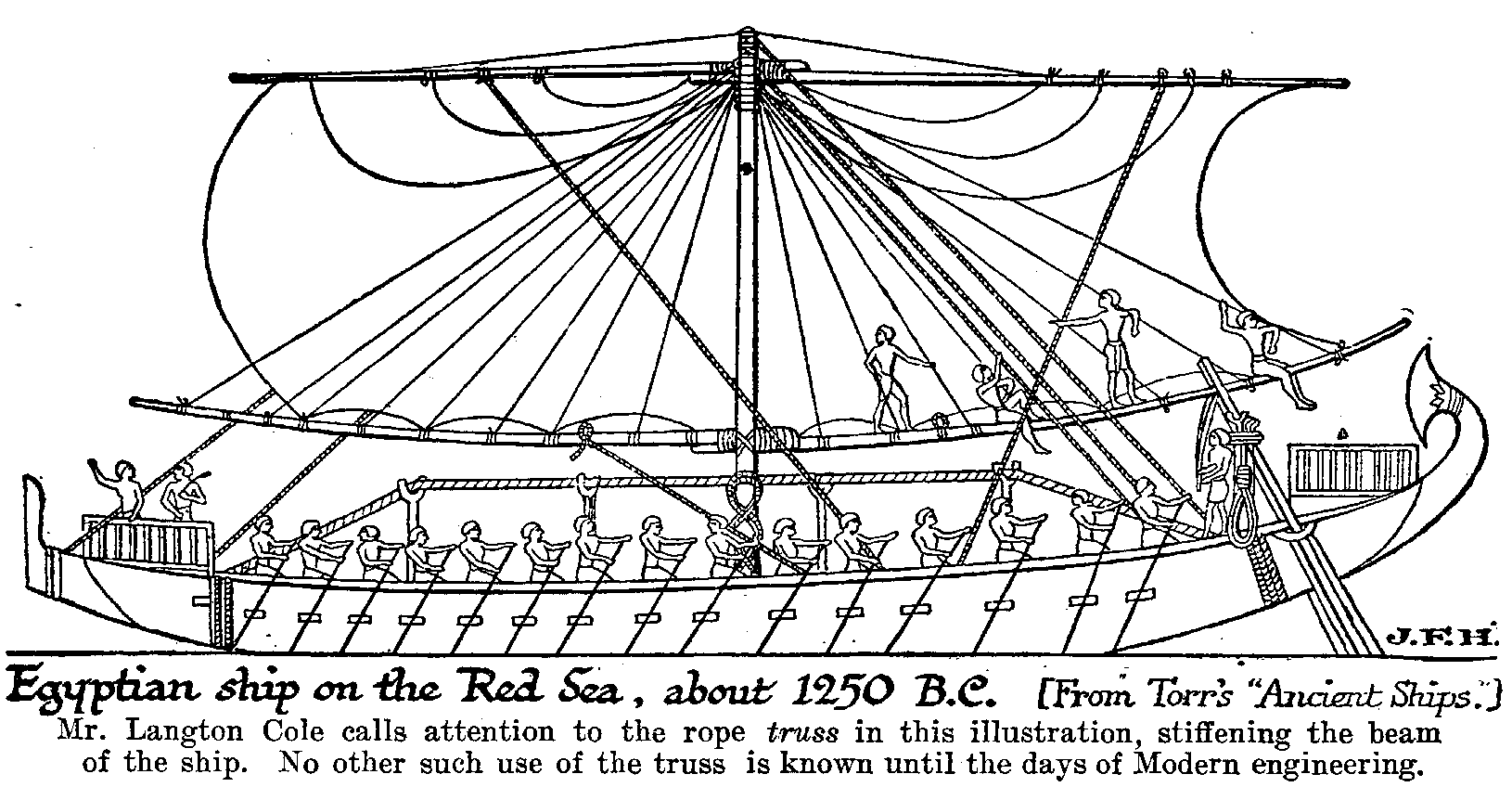
Drawing of Ancient Egyptian ship with a sail.

Ships and boats were an important part of the ancient Egyptian's life. The earliest boats in Egypt were made during the time of the Old Kingdom where they were used along the Nile River. Because of the lack of wood, boats were made with bundled papyrus reeds. The boats were 25 meters long, two to three meters wide, and sixty centimeters deep which allowed seating for 30 rowers with one to two rudder oars. Hulls were sickle shaped and often had masts and deck houses. Over time the Egyptians tried to transport heavier loads and this brought about the desire for stronger boats. Trade and war also assisted in the desire to have stronger, sturdier vessels. The wooden vessels were similar to those made of reeds but the main difference was the eventual adoption of a single square mast that was fastened to the gunwale. After being reinforced, it was able to carry 300 ton loads up and down the Nile River. These vessels, despite being reinforced, were unable to be used in the Mediterranean or Red Seas. The use of ships in Egyptian Warfare is as old as conflict in Egypt itself but there was very little ability for sea travel to be achieved. When sea travel was obtained, the vessels and the wars they were in were depicted in red on pottery of that time period.

== Persian Navy ==
The Achaemenid Empire, also known as the Persian Empire, had primarily a land based military but around 5th century BC, at the time of Cambyses II, the Empire started to develop a navy to allow for expansion. Their first ships were built by Phoenicians in their shipyards. These ships were 40 meters in length and 6 meters in width and able to carry 300 soldiers. Shortly after these ships were made, arsenals were made to make new ships as well as improve and repair the vessels. These ships were used to sail the Black Sea, the Aegean Sea, and coastal areas. The mariners of these vessels were Phoenicians, Greeks, Cypriots, and Egyptians. The Phoenicians however became the primary mariners of the vessels they made. These ships also had a metal blade in the front to cut enemy ships in half when ramming. They also had hooks which were used to catch and stop enemy ships. The Empire had three different major naval bases. The first was along the Shaat aI-Arab waterway. The second was to protect the eastern and southern parts of the Mediterranean Sea. The third was located in Cilicia and had a main goal of influencing the Greeks. These bases were kept on constant battle readiness in the case they had to project their power.

== Roman Navy ==
Prior to the Punic Wars the Roman classis or fleet was limited to minor coastal operations and support for trade. The Romans concentrated on land based operations until this period in order to conquer and consolidate the Italian Peninsula. The wars with Carthage forced the Romans to adapt to naval operations in order to compete and defend themselves. These fleets were built in several different places such as the coast of Italy and Southern Tuscany.

=== First Punic War ===
During the First Punic War a large fleet was built allegedly using a stranded Phoenician vessel as a prototype. The Romans lacked the skill of other maritime powers such as the Greeks and Carthaginians and had to resort to technology for advantages. The traditional naval tactic of ramming wasn't abandoned, but the Roman ships were fitted with a corvus to accommodate their strengths in land combat. This movable boarding bridge enabled the Romans to transform naval combat from ramming and sinking to boarding with marines through capturing and plundering the vessels. In its initial stages this new combat style enabled the Romans to win some overwhelming successes against the Carthaginian fleet, but the added weight of the corvus made their vessels less maneuverable and seaworthy resulting in heavy losses with violent weather conditions. A tactic that the Romans used were the use of fireships and combustibles. The combustibles were thrown on board the enemy ships to damage the ship and its personnel.

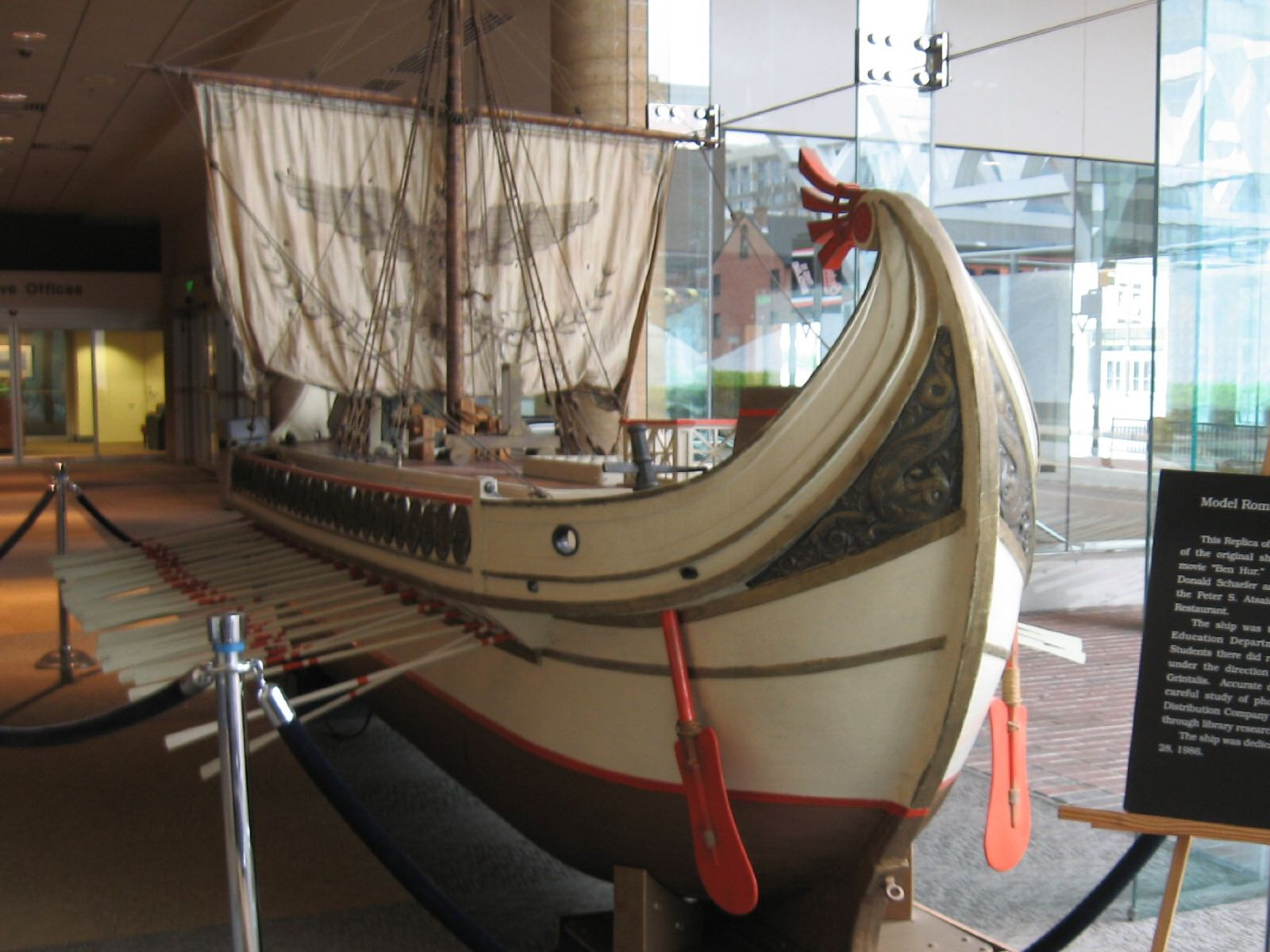

=== Second Punic War ===
During the Second Punic War, Hannibal abandoned the once formidable Carthaginian fleet to focus on land operations. This was caused by a victory that bred confidence and led to the eventual invasion of North Africa. Their newly founded sea prowess enabled the Roman legions to land on the coast of North Africa and bring the war out of Italy and into the laps of the Carthaginians.

=== Post Punic War Roman Navy ===
With the final destruction of Carthage, and the end of the Third Punic War in 146 BC, Rome was the master of sea power in the Mediterranean. In both the Second and Third Punic Wars, Roman sea power was predominant, though not vigorously exercised. This caused restrictions for the Carthaginian communication forces and forced them to keep strong defensive garrisons in Spain and their home territory. However, the conquest of Carthage also eliminated the threat of maritime warfare as there was no longer any sea powers left to challenge Roman supremacy. As a result, the navy slipped into the logistical role of support to the legions and providing escort for trade vessels and grain shipments, with the adverse effect of drastically increasing piracy.

=== Imperial Roman Navy and Beyond ===
The imperial navy after Augustus, aside from the occasional conflicts in civil wars, once again was primarily charged with the protection of shipping and deterring piracy. Rome maintained two large fleets, the Classis Praetoria Misenensis and Classis Praetoria Ravennatis based in the Mediterranean with smaller squadrons operating on the North Sea, Black Sea and along the major rivers running throughout the provinces. Misenum, built by Agrippa in 31 BC, was the main naval base of the Mediterranean, joined by Ravenna, Aleria on Corsica and other temporary ports. The military situations on the Rhine and the Danube necessitated the construction of several dedicated fleet installations for the provincial fleets, classis Germanica, Pannonia and Moesica, but most were attached to the existing forts of Provincial Legions. In the English Channel and the North Sea (Oceanus Britannicus and Oceanus Germanicus), the Classis Britannica was stationed at Portus Itius (Boulogne) in Gaul and later also used the Saxon Shore forts of Britannia as bases.

As Roman power waned in the 4th and 5th centuries AD, so went the Roman navy. In 429 AD, the Vandals embarked on ships from southern Gaul and landed in North Africa, where they established their own kingdom. Within a couple of decades, the Roman Empire consisted of little more than the city of Rome itself and its original territories in Latium and Central Italy. The Vandals' powerful navy contributed to the fall of the Western Empire when Vandal pirate King Gaiseric not only eliminated Roman shipping on the Mediterranean, but also invaded Rome itself. By the mid 5th century, the Vandals were the masters of the sea, and by 476 AD, Rome had fallen completely from power in Western Europe.

== See also ==
- Galley
- Hellenistic-era warships
