= Ambassador MK III missile boat =

Small warship class of the Egyptian Navy

Ambassador MK III
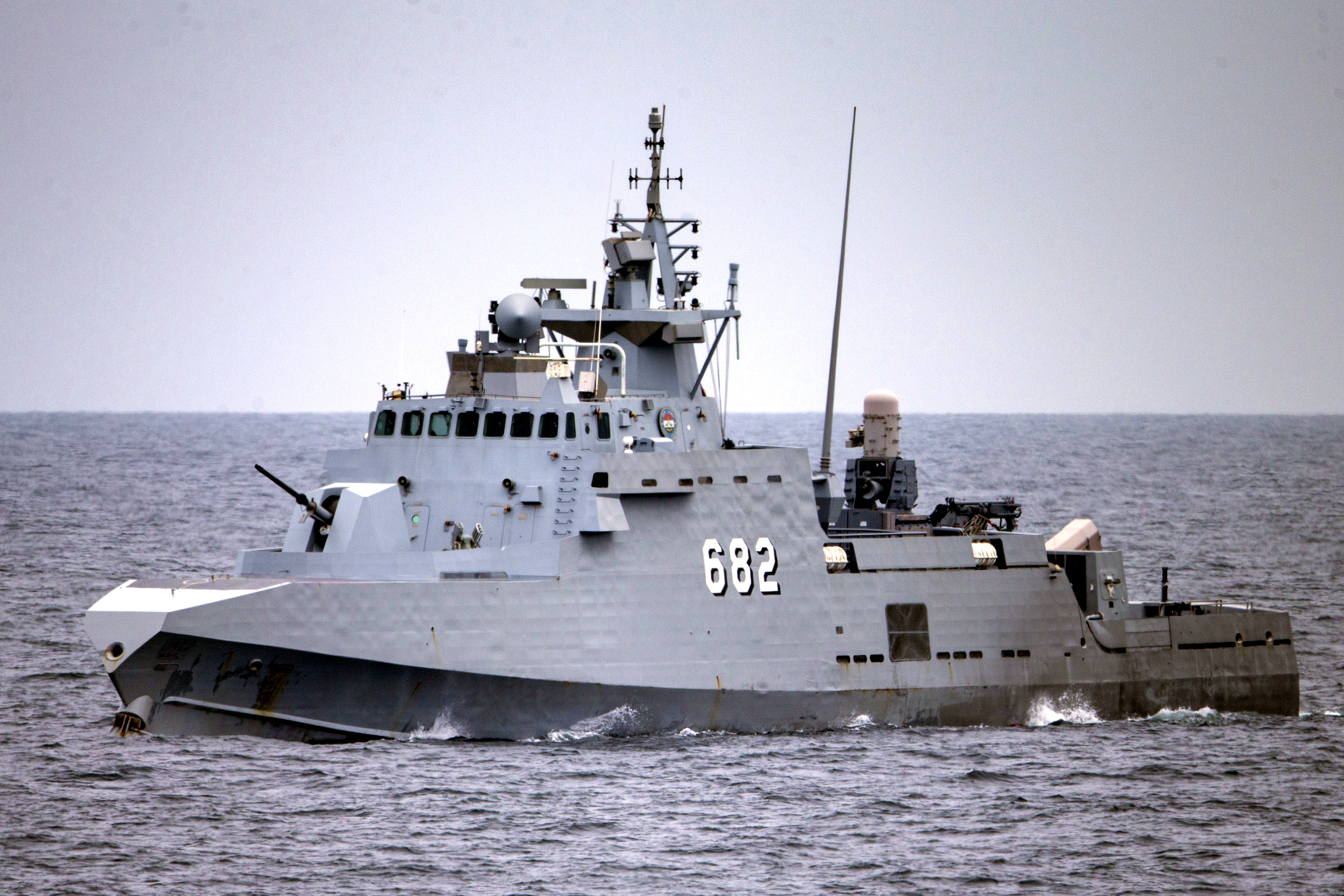

Class overview
- Name: Ambassador MK III
- Builders: VT Halter Marine
- Operators: Egyptian Navy
- Cost: US$1.290 billion (total program in 2009); US$240m (marginal cost of fourth hull in 2009)
- Built: 2008–2013
- In commission: 2013–
- Planned: 4
- Active: 4

General characteristics
- Type: Missile boat
- Displacement: 600 tons
- Length: 63 m (206 ft 8 in)
- Beam: 10 m (32 ft 10 in)
- Draft: 2 m (6 ft 7 in)
- Installed power: 4× MTU diesels, 30,000 hp (22 MW)
- Propulsion: 4 shafts
- Speed: 41 knots (76 km/h)
- Range: 2,000 nmi (3,700 km; 2,300 mi) at 15 knots (28 km/h; 17 mph)
- Endurance: 8 days at sea
- Complement: 36 (8 officers, 10 chief petty officers, and 18 ratings), 38
- Sensors & processing systems: Thales MRR-3D NG G band multi-role radar; Thales Scout (I/J band) Maritime Surveillance Radar; Thales STING-EO Mk2 fire control Radar; Link ASN 150, LinkYE, Link 14 and Link 11 data links; IFF; TACTICOS Combat Management System with Model 033-2T/066-2T Tracking Pedestals.
- Electronic warfare & decoys: 4 × chaff/IR Decoy launchers; ESM/ECM
- Armament: 8 × RGM-84 Boeing Harpoon SSM Block 1G in 2 quad canister launchers; 1 × OTO Melara Mk 75 76 mm/62 Super Rapid DP gun; 1 × Mk 31 Mod 3 RIM-116 RAM (21 missiles); 1 × Raytheon Mk 15 Mod 21 Phalanx (Block 1B) 20 mm Phalanx CIWS; 2 × deck-mounted 7.62 mm M60 machine guns

The Ambassador MK III fast missile craft or Ezzat class is a small warship built by VT Halter Marine for the Egyptian Navy. Four ships were planned at a total cost of US$1.290b; the first, S. Ezzat, was handed over in November 2013 and the remainder were scheduled to follow in 2013-14. Egypt already operated Halter's Ambassador design as a patrol boat for their Coast Guard fleet, and chose a variant of the design with reduced radar cross-section as the basis for a large modern missile boat. Its design was conducted with the assistance of Lockheed Martin.

== Background ==
The Egyptian Navy has used fast missile boats to patrol its coastline and defend the entrances to the strategic Suez Canal since the Soviet Union transferred Komar-class missile boats in 1962-67 and Osa-class missile boats in 1966-68. Their success in sinking the Israeli destroyer Eilat in 1967 and other targets led to the Egyptians acquiring fast attack craft from Europe and China, but the last were acquired in 1982 and by the late 1990s replacements were needed.

== New design ==
On 7 August 2004 the Defense Security Cooperation Agency (DSCA) notified the sale of three fast missile craft to Egypt for US$565m under a U.S. Navy Foreign Military Sales program managed by the U.S. Navy's Naval Sea Systems Command (NAVSEA). A contract was expected to be signed by the end of that year, but industry sources indicate that the program remained in limbo over technical questions that were not resolved until a meeting in Alexandria in January 2005. Phase I began in December 2005, when VT Halter Marine signed a USD 28.8m contract with the US Department of Defense to develop a functional design for a fast missile craft for the Egyptian Navy. This was a new design, sometimes referred to as the Ambassador Mk IV design. Under this phase, VT Halter Marine conducted analytical, design, engineering and model testing for the craft. The effort included preparation for the integration of C4ISR as well as a combat system effectiveness study to validate the system requirements of the vessel. The first phase was completed in December 2006.

On 7 September 2008, the DSCA reported that the budget for three ships had increased to US$1.050 billion and construction finally began in November 2009. On 17 December 2009 the DSCA announced that a fourth vessel would be procured for an additional US$240m, increasing the program cost to US$1.290 billion. In May 2010, the Egyptian Navy was in discussions for the procurement of two additional units (five and six). These units could begin around 2014.

== Service history ==
In a ceremony on 25 October 2011, the four vessels had been named as S. Ezzat (named after the Commander in chief Admiral Soliman Ezzat, served between 1953 and 1967), F. Zekry, M. Fahmy and A. Gad. S. Ezzat was laid down on 7 April 2011 and launched in October 2011 and was handed over to the Egyptian Navy on 19 November 2013. F. Zekry was handed over in December.

On 17 June 2015, the US delivered the remaining two vessels M. Fahmy and A. Gad, on board a U.S. transport ship, to the port of Alexandria. The officers have been under instruction at Pensacola since July 2013, and crew training started in July 2014.

The S. Ezzat class participated in many naval exercises with French, Russian and Hellenic Navy and other national and international exercises.

Members of the class participated in the Yemen Civil War as a part of Saudi-led coalition. The S. Ezzat class was one of four Egyptian warships that sailed on 26 March 2015 through the Suez Canal en route to Yemen to support a Saudi-led operation against anti-government rebels. Warships from a Red Sea base had moved to the Gulf of Aden to secure the regional waters and bab el mandeb strait

== List of units ==
Hull number	Name	Commissioned	Status
682	S. Ezzat	19 November 2013	Active
684	F. Zekry	2013	Active
686	M. Fahmy	2015	Active
688	A. Gad	2015	Active
