= Egyptian Coast Guard =

- Egyptian Coast Guard Racing Stripe
- Active: 1887–present
- Country: Egypt
- Branch: Egyptian Navy
- Type: Coast guard
- Size: 2,000 (As of 2013)
- Garrison/HQ: Alexandria

Egyptian Coast Guard, part of the Egyptian Navy, is responsible for the onshore protection of public installations near the coast and the patrol of coastal waters to prevent smuggling. Currently consists of one hundred five ships and craft. The Egyptian Coast Guard has over 5,000 personnel.

== Developments ==
In September 2025, a subsidiary of the German shipbuilding group NVL, NVL Egypt, began making 10 new coast guard boats under the program PV43-M . They will all be constructed in Egypt with the support of NVL.

== Patrol boats ==
- 22 Timsah I/II class
- 12 Sea Spectre PB Mk III class
- 9 Swiftships class
- 6 MV70 class
- 5 P-6 (Project 183) class
- 3 Textron class

== Patrol crafts ==
- 25 Swiftships 26m class
- 16 SR.N6 class
- 9 Type 83 class
- 6 Crestitalia class
- 12 Spectre class
- 12 Peterson class
- 5 Nisr class
- 29 DC-30 class
- 3 of 6 MRTP-20 Yonka Onuk MRTP-20 class

== See also ==
- Port security
- Maritime security regime
