= Ancient Egyptian navy =

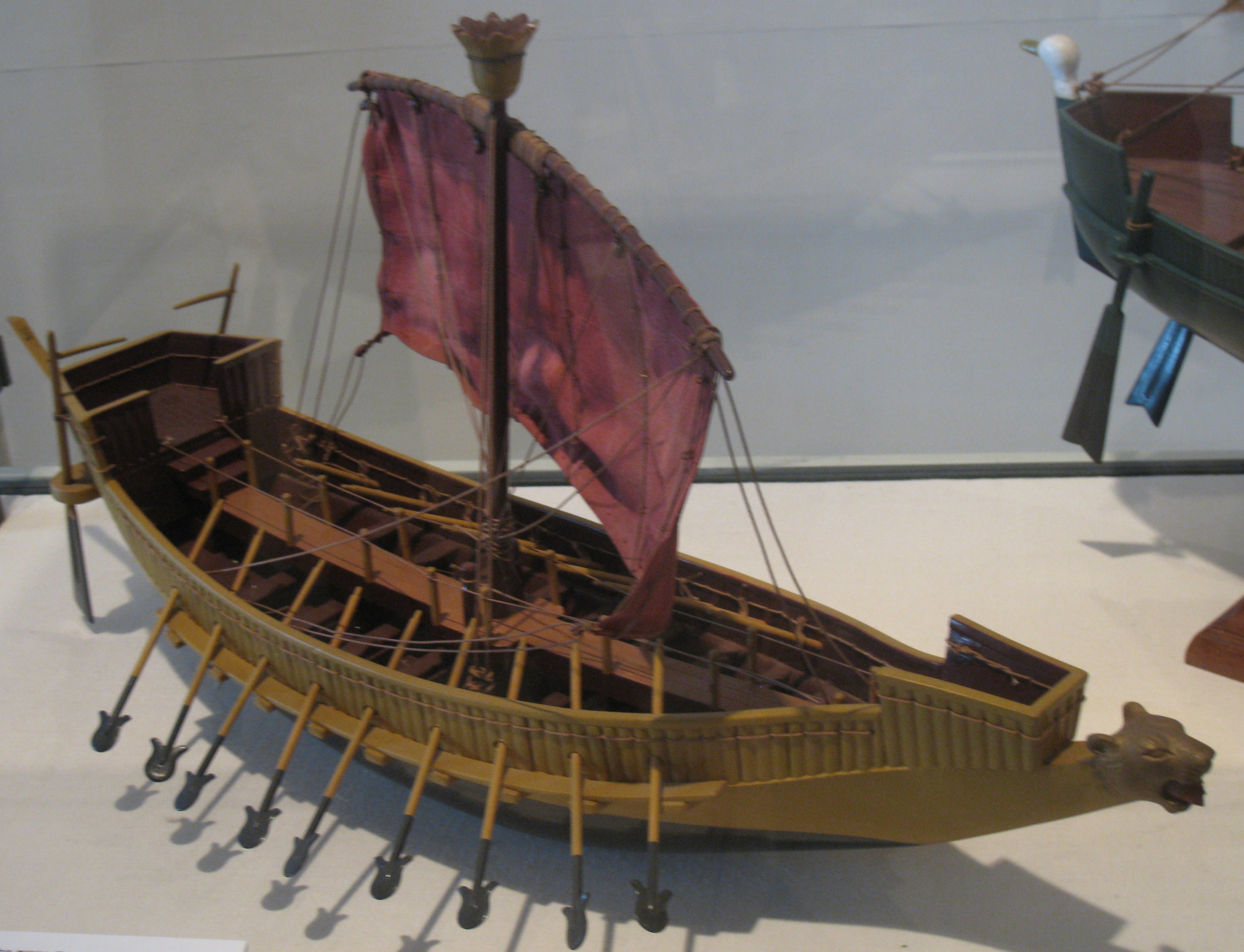
Model of a warship fleet of Ramses III

The ancient Egyptian navy has a very extensive history almost as old as the nation itself. The best sources over the type of ships they used and their purposes come from the reliefs from the various religious temples that spread throughout the land. While the early ships that were used to sail the Nile were often made out of reeds, the ocean and seagoing ships were then made out of cedar wood, most probably from the woods of Byblos in present day Lebanon. While the use of navy was not as important to the Egyptians as it may have been to the Greeks or Romans, it still proved its worth during the Thutmoside campaigns and even in defending Egypt under Ramesses III. Thutmose III understood the importance in maintaining a fast and efficient communications and supply line that would connect his bases in the Levantine region with Egypt. For this reason, he constructed his famous dockyard for the royal fleet near Memphis, whose sole purpose was to constantly supply the campaigning Egyptian army with additional troops as well as communication with Egypt and general supplies.

During the Old Kingdom all the way until the beginning of the New Kingdom, the navy and vessels of the ancient Egyptians were almost nonexistent other than to perform communication and transportation duties. However, through the massive reorganization of the Egyptian military in the New Kingdom and the aggressive foreign policy pursued by the Pharaohs, the navy began to become ever more crucial in maintaining Egyptian power and influence abroad.

== Construction of ships ==
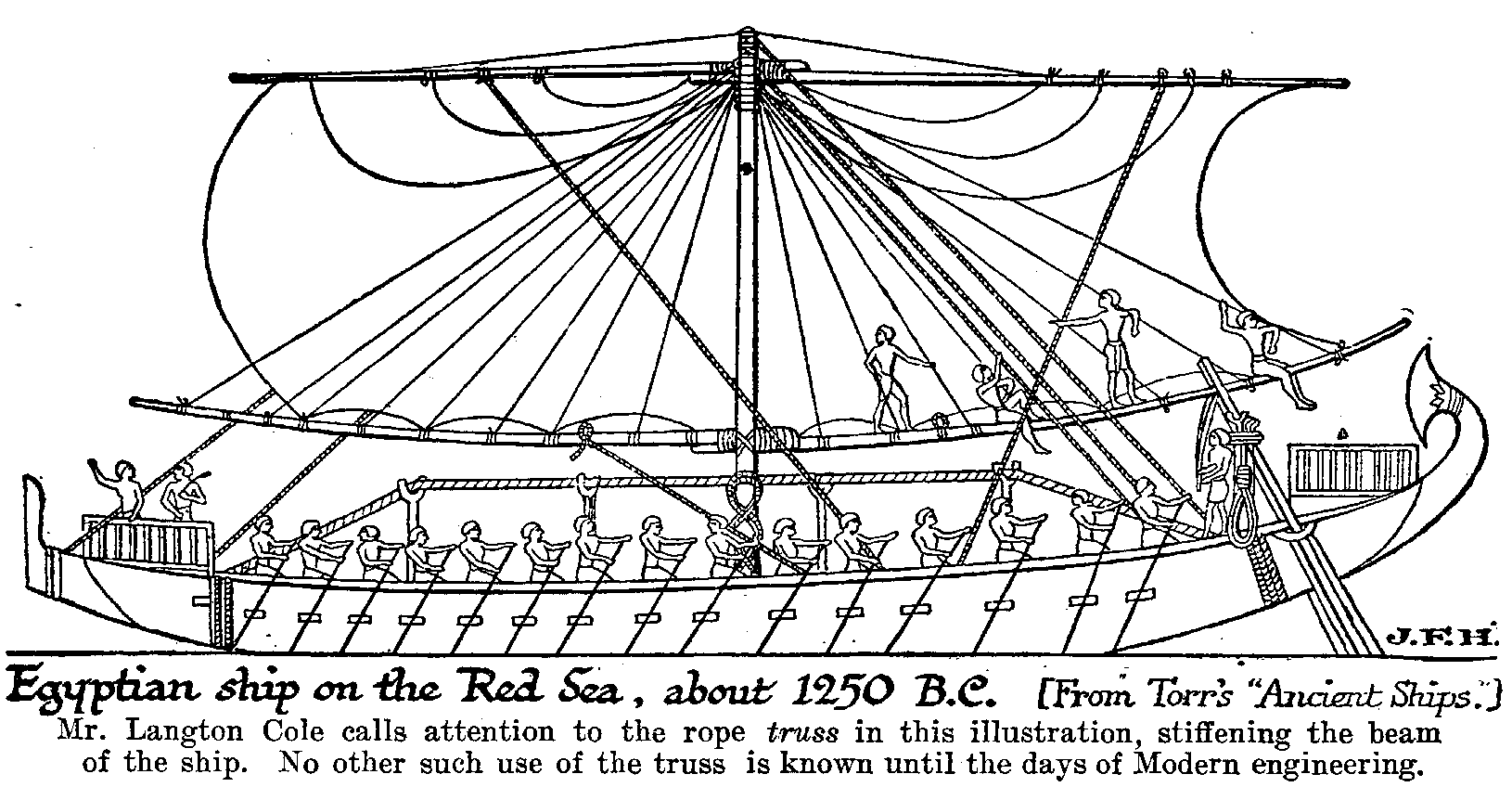
Drawing of an ancient Egyptian ship

Ships were first constructed in a very basic manner in which they used reeds. These ships were in no way able to travel in the Red or Mediterranean Sea, and so their purpose was only to navigate through the Nile. Whenever ships were required to endure longer travels, Egypt often imported cedar wood from Byblos, with whom they had good trade relations. At the same time, they would ask other states that they traded with to supply them with a certain number of ships. This is exemplified in the Amarna letters where we find a request to the King of Cyprus to construct ships for the Egyptian navy. By the time of the Battle of the Sea Peoples, the Egyptians had become experts in constructing ships. Their ships had a single Mast with a horizontal square sail on it. One bow was usually decorated with a human skull being crushed by a lion’s head. These ships often had two steering oars, since built in rudders were not invented at the time. At the same time, they could have been as heavy as 70 or 80 tonnes with around 50 rowers.

== Purpose ==
The Egyptian navy had four main purposes:

1. the transportation of troops and supplies to certain areas that required them,
2. to use as a platform from which archers would fire their arrows upon the enemy that were land or sea-based,
3. to destroy other enemy ships,
4. to carry prisoners.

== Transportation ==
The Egyptian landscape is often considered harsh and very difficult to travel through except for the few miles that surround the Nile Valley. For this reason, using ships as a means of communication and transportation proved to be very effective. The Egyptians had used their navy for the first and most important purpose in this manner. They would send soldiers to areas throughout Egypt whose jobs it was to quell rebellions or to repel attackers. This is very evident in the use of the ships to transport food and supplies to the forts that were stationed in the south near Nubia. These forts often were placed in difficult areas and so in order to feed themselves they relied heavily upon the rations that they received from cities such as Thebes and Karnak. This purpose was always used by the Egyptian from the very start of their civilization to the time of the New Kingdom where they would resupply their troops based in the Levantine region via the sea.

== Platforms ==
This is especially noticeable in the reliefs of the Medinet Habu temple that show the great attempted invasion of Egypt by the Sea Peoples. This relief shows us the Egyptian small yet maneuverable ships fighting against the larger yet slower ships of the Sea People. It portrays the ships as platforms from which archers and slingers can pepper down the enemy from. Having such fast and maneuverable ships enabled the Egyptians to constantly harass the enemy at a range while at the same time withdraw to safety and attack from a different side. At this stage, this purpose existed mostly in the New Kingdom era, although we are led to believe that it was used during the Second Intermediate Period during the siege of Avaris by Ahmose.

== Boardings of people ==
This purpose probably took place more during the New Kingdom when the situation arose for the Egyptians to disable any threats to their sea. It is also most visible to us from the temple relief of Medinat Habu in which it portrays the Egyptian Marines on board the ships attempting to board the vessels of the Sea Peoples. Upon boarding them, most of the crew on the Egyptian ships would arm themselves and fight in close quarter combat through the use of spears, shields, and battle axes. The Egyptian never had a specific Marine unit, but rather it was known that anyone on board is equally capable of both maintaining the ship and fighting at the same time. The Egyptians would board other ships using the most common method of using grappling hooks to pull in a ship after peppering them with arrows and sling shots.

== Famous naval battles ==
While naval battles are not often recounted since there was no distinction between the navy and the army in ancient Egypt, we do gather some information every now and then of battles that were fought through the use of ships.

=== The siege of Avaris ===
One such example is when Ahmose led a siege against the Hyksos city of Avaris at the end of the 17th and beginning of the 18th Dynasty. One account of the siege comes from a soldier and sailor that fought in the siege named Ahmose, son of Ebana. In his accounts, he states how he was stationed on a ship called the Northern in which he sailed with the Egyptian army towards Avaris. After fighting a battle, they laid siege to the city and surrounded it. The siege of Avaris must have been a combined naval and land based attack since Ahmose, son of Ebana claimed to have "fought in the canal against Pezedku of Avaris".

=== The war against the Sea Peoples ===
This war is perhaps the most famous Egyptian war heavily involving the naval strength of the empire, and it is the first to ever be well documented. During the reign of Ramesses III which was in 1182 BCE to 1151 BCE, a new threat arose to challenge the Egyptians in a different way than what they were used to. A new people called the Sea Peoples were arriving in the Levantine region and destroying its cities. Already the once mighty Hittites and many of the Mycenaean Greek cities were destroyed by these people of mysterious origin and it soon became obvious that Egypt with all of its wealth would be next. Ramesses III prepared a mighty fleet and planned to repulse the Sea Peoples in the Nile. In the account from the temple relief of Medinat Habu Ramises states, "I prepared the river-mouth like a strong wall with warships, galleys, and light craft. They were completely equipped both fore and aft with brave fighters carrying their weapons, and infantry of all the pick of Egypt."

In that relief, it portrays the enemy with their tall ships all falling into the Nile and pierced by the arrows that were being fired from the Egyptian ships. At the same time, Ramesses claims that he lured the enemy close to Nile shore where he unleashed upon them hundreds of thousands of arrows. The Egyptians on their fast and nimble riverine crafts won against the maritime vessels of the Sea People, who are depicted by the Egyptians as ill equipped for ranged combat.

== See also ==
- Ptolemaic navy
