= Baharia, Bangladesh =

- Location in Bangladesh
- Coordinates: 23°11′N 90°39′E
- Country: Bangladesh
- Division: Chittagong Division
- District: Chandpur District
- Time zone: UTC+6 (Bangladesh Time)

Baharia, Bangladesh is a village in Chandpur District in the Chittagong Division of eastern Bangladesh.

One of the largest river of Bangladesh, The Meghna flows besides Baharia. MD. Salamat Ullah Khan from Baharia Khan Bari was the first elected chairman of Baharia Union Parishad election and his Chairmanship was resumed till 22 years from the period of British rule to Pakistani rule. He developed many rural structure of Baharia Union area including with the Baharia Bazar which is still now one of the largest bazar of the south Puran Bazar under Chandpuur district. At that time Golden Fibre of Bangladesh (then East Pakistan) was the main exported product of Bangladesh which earned lion percent foreign currency for that time and was the highest revenue amongst other exported products then that time of East Pakistan. MD. Salamat Ullah Khan in his chairmanship period had made the Baharia Bazar one of the largest Retail and wholesale Golden Fiber trade market in the Chandpur District as well as in Bangladesh.
