= Egyptian Navy =

Maritime warfare service branch of Egypt's military

- القوات البحرية المصرية (Arabic)
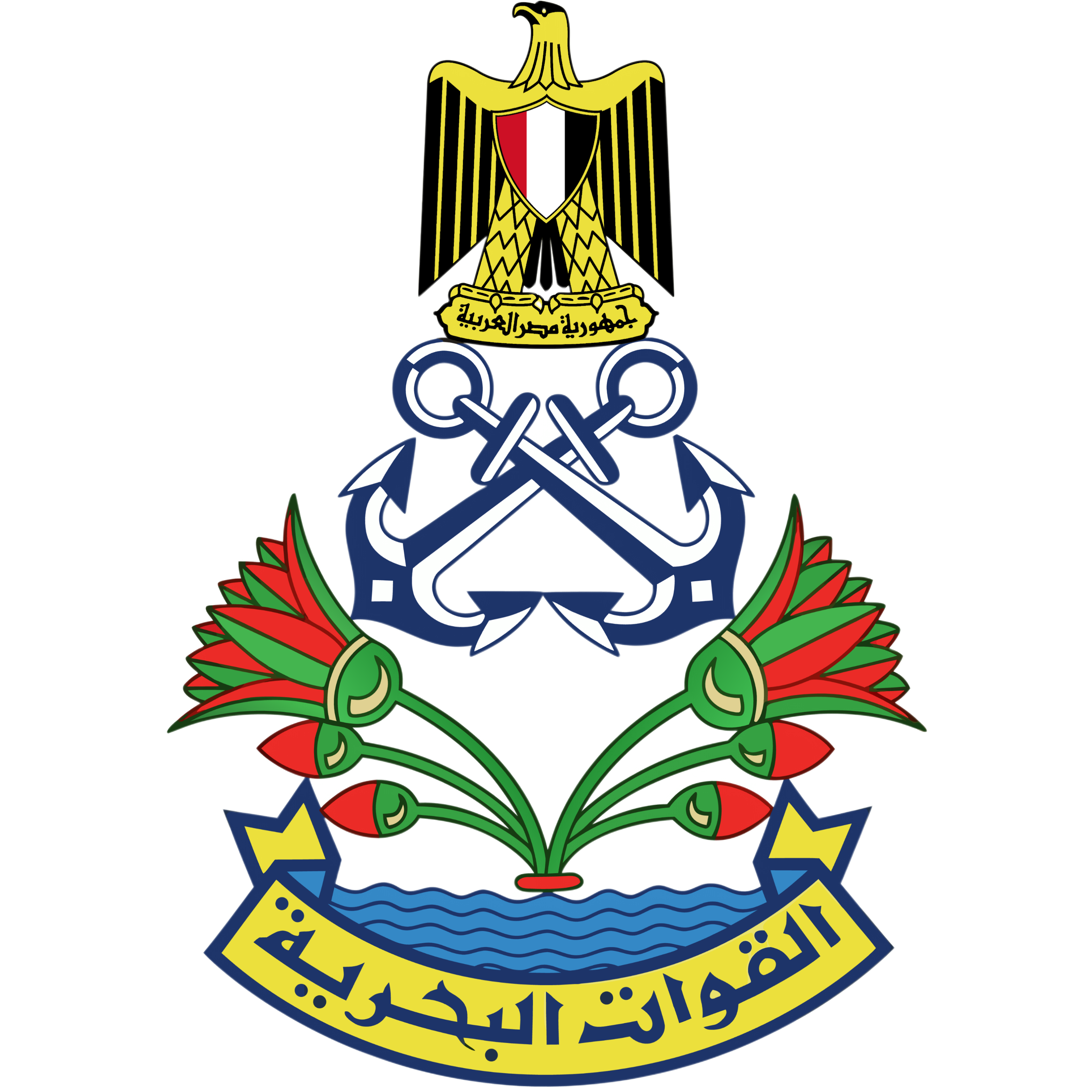
- Emblem of the Egyptian Navy
- Founded: 1800
- Country: Egypt
- Type: Navy
- Size: 30,000 active personnel 20,000 reserve personnel 50,000 total personnel 320 vessels
- Part of: Egyptian Armed Forces
- Headquarters: Alexandria, Egypt
- Mottos: Knowledge, Honor, Sacrifice
- Colours: Blue, red, white and black
- March: March of the Navy
- Anniversaries: 21 October
- Equipment: Current fleet
- Engagements: List Wahhabi War; Greek War of Independence; Crimean War; Cretan Revolt; Anglo-Egyptian War (1882); World War II; Suez Crisis; North Yemen Civil War; Six-Day War; War of Attrition; Yom Kippur War; Gulf War; Sinai Insurgency; Yemeni Civil War (2014–present)

Commanders
- Supreme commander: President Abdel Fattah el-Sisi
- Minister of Defense: Lieutenant general Ashraf Salem Zaher
- Chief of Staff of the Armed Forces: Lieutenant general Ahmed Fathy Khalifa
- Commander of the Navy: Vice Admiral Mahmoud Adel Fawzy
- Chief of Staff of the Navy: Staff Rear Admiral Mohamed El-Sherbiny

Insignia
- Flag

- Ensign

Aircraft flown
- Attack: Rafale, F-16
- Electronic warfare: Northrop Grumman E-2 Hawkeye
- Fighter: Rafale, F-16
- Helicopter: Aérospatiale Gazelle, Kaman SH-2G Super Seasprite, Westland Sea King, NH90

The Egyptian Navy (Arabic: القوات البحرية المصرية, romanized: Al-Quwwāt Al-Bahareya Al-Misriyya, lit. 'Egyptian Navy Forces'), also known as the Egyptian Naval Forces, is the maritime service branch of the Egyptian Armed Forces. It is the largest navy in the Middle East as well as Africa, and the twelfth largest (by the number of vessels) navy in the world. The navy protects more than 2,000 kilometers of coastline of the Mediterranean Sea and the Red Sea, defense of approaches to the Suez Canal, and it also supports for army operations.

In the early 19th century, Egypt modernized its navy under Muhammad Ali, but its fleet was destroyed at the Battle of Navarino in 1827, forcing withdrawal from Greece. Rebuilt forces supported campaigns against the Ottomans, whose fleet defected in 1839; European intervention curtailed Egyptian autonomy. In the 1860s, the Egyptian navy saw an expansion in its maritime standing and infrastructure, alongside the opening of the Suez Canal.

In the 20th century, the navy has participated in several conflicts particularly against Israel. It received significant support from the Soviet Union in the 1960s. In the 1980s, the navy acquired naval vessels from China and from Western sources. As of 1989, the Egyptian Navy had 18,000 personnel as well as 2,000 personnel in the Coast Guard. The navy received ships from the United States in the year 1990. US shipbuilder Swiftships has built around 30 boats for the Egyptian Navy including mine hunters, survey vessels, and both steel and aluminium patrol boats.

== History ==
=== Ancient ===
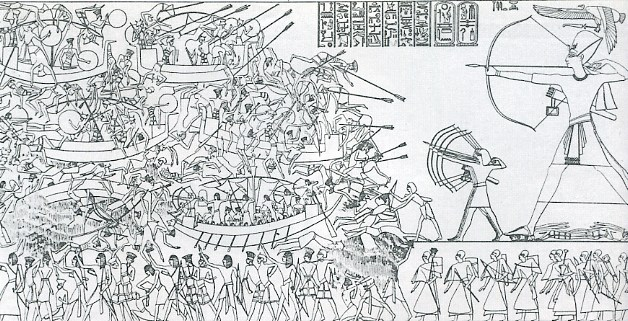
Ramses III at the Battle of the Delta between the Egyptian Navy and the Sea Peoples approximately 1175 BC

The history of the Egyptian Navy goes back to ancient Egypt, expanding notably during the New Kingdom era, particularly during the reign of Pharaoh Thutmose III. The Ancient Egyptian navy was a vital part of the military of ancient Egypt. They facilitated the transport of troops along the Nile River and played a key role in Egyptian wars and battles, such as the siege of Avaris around 1540 BC, as well as participating in numerous other engagements, including the 1175 BC Battle of the Delta against the Sea Peoples. Egypt possessed ships of its own manufacture, and it also imported many of its vessels from countries such as the Kingdom of Cyprus.

=== Medieval ===
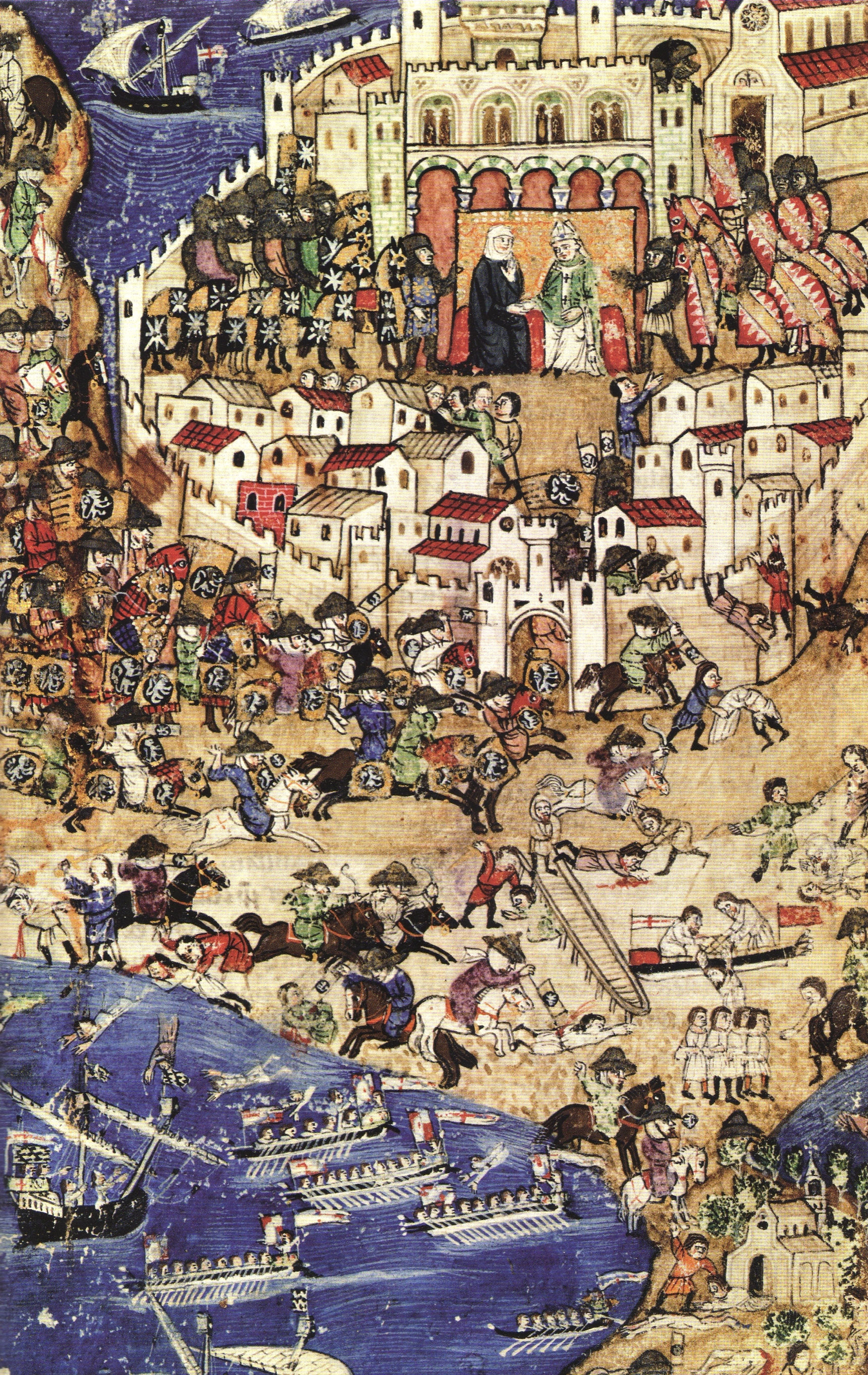
Painting showing Egyptian navy moving towards the shores marking the fall of Tripoli to the Egyptians, April 1289

Egypt had been the base of a significant navy already in the early Muslim period, mostly manned by native Egyptians, as the Arabs themselves had little experience for the sea. An Egyptian fleet was attested as late as 736 AD in an attack on Byzantine territory. Following Egypt's independence from the Abbasids, the Tulunid regime of Egypt (868–905 AD), Egypt revived its naval power. Retaining tax revenues locally rather than sending them to Baghdad funded the construction of a strong fleet in the eastern Mediterranean and control over Red Sea trade routes. The medieval Egyptian navy reached its peak during the Fatimid period, the Fatimid navy (969–1171 AD), dominated the eastern Mediterranean and protected trade and coasts. Later, under the Sultanate of Egypt during Ayyubid and Mamluk regimes shifted focus on land forces and naval power declined, though fleets were later scrambled in the Red Sea against Portuguese incursions.

=== Modern ===
In the early 1800s, Egypt under Muhammad Ali Pasha developed a modern European-style army and navy. After intervening in the Greek War of Independence at Ottoman Turkey's request, the Egyptian navy was destroyed in 1827 at the Battle of Navarino by the fleets of Great Britain, France and Russia. With the Egyptian army in Greece then isolated, Muhammad Ali made terms with the British and withdrew a year later.

A replacement fleet was built for the First Egyptian–Ottoman War in 1831, and landed troops at Jaffa in support of the main Egyptian army marching into Syria. In the Second Egyptian–Ottoman War in 1839, following Egyptian victory in the Battle of Nezib, the Ottoman fleet sailed to Alexandria and defected to the Egyptian side. However, these victories provoked decisive European intervention to support the Turks, and while Muhammad Ali's dynasty continued to reign, In the 1860s, during the reign of Khedive Ismail, the Egyptian navy saw an expansion in its maritime standing and infrastructure, alongside the opening of the Suez Canal. Egypt ended up being transformed into a British protectorate in 1914 until the declaration of Egyptian Independence in 1922.

The Egyptian navy was only peripherally involved in the series of conflicts with Israel. On 22 October 1948, the Egyptian sloop El Amir Farouq was sunk in the Mediterranean Sea off Gaza by a motor explosive boat of the Israeli Navy during the Israeli naval campaign in Operation Yoav as part of the 1948 Arab–Israeli War. During the Suez Crisis, Egypt dispatched the Ibrahim el Awal, an ex-British Hunt class destroyer, to Haifa with the aim of shelling the city's coastal oil installations. On 31 October the Ibrahim el Awal reached Haifa and began bombarding the city but was driven off by a French warship and then pursued by the Israeli destroyers INS Eilat and INS Yaffo which, with the help of the Israeli Air Force, captured the ship. Egyptian destroyers and torpedo boats engaged larger British vessels in a move aimed at frustrating the amphibious operations of the British and French. On the night of 31 October in the northern Red Sea, the British light cruiser HMS Newfoundland challenged and engaged the Egyptian frigate Domiat, eventually sinking it in a brief gun battle. The Egyptian warship was then sunk by escorting destroyer HMS Diana, with 69 surviving Egyptian sailors rescued.

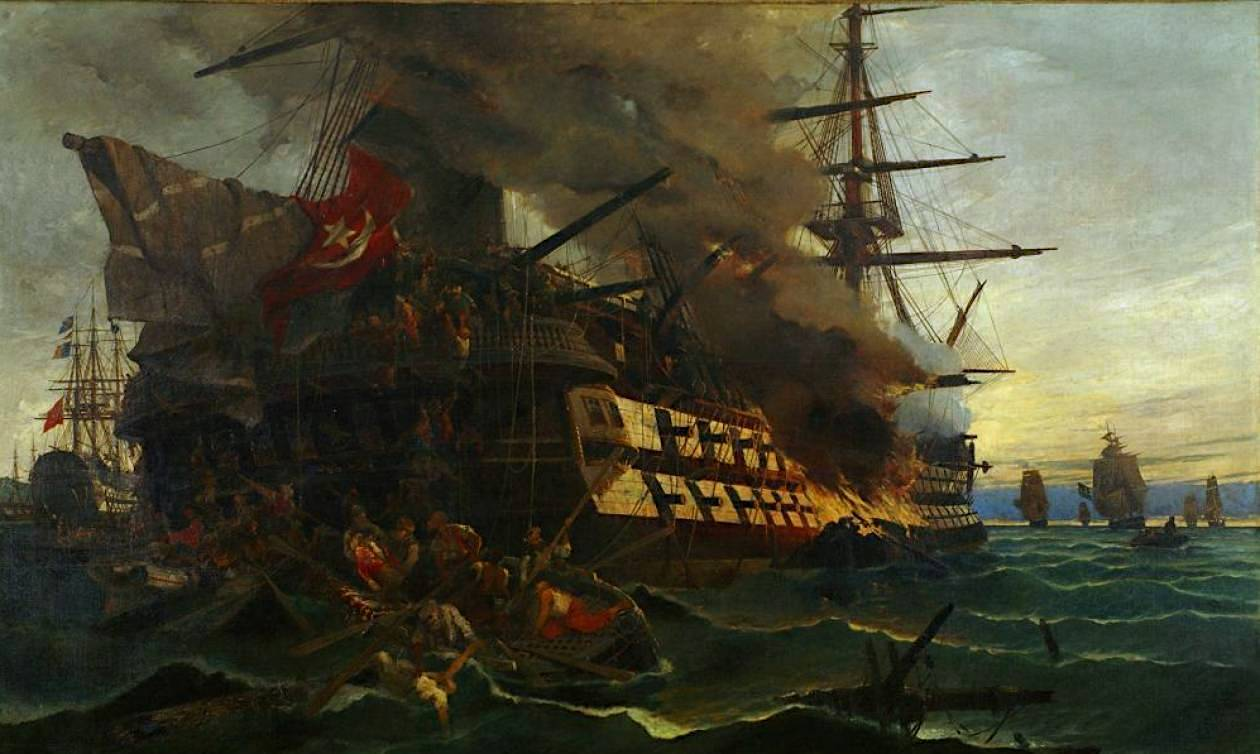
Egyptian and Ottoman Navy during the war of Greece's independence from the Ottoman Empire

The Egyptian Navy's blockade of Israeli ships in the Strait of Tiran that were headed toward the Israeli port of Eilat was one of the main causes of the Six-Day War. During the war, the Israeli Navy landed six combat divers from the Shayetet 13 naval commando unit to infiltrate Alexandria harbor. The divers sank an Egyptian minesweeper before being taken prisoner. Both Egyptian and Israeli warships made movements at sea to intimidate the other side throughout the war, but did not engage each other. However, Israeli warships and aircraft did hunt for Egyptian submarines throughout the war.

In October 1967, a few months after the cease-fire, the Egyptian Navy was the first navy in history to sink a ship using anti-ship missiles, when an Egyptian Komar-class fast-attack craft sank the Israeli destroyer INS Eilat with two direct hits. This was a milestone of modern naval warfare, and for the first time anti-ship missiles showed their potential, sinking the destroyer 17 km off Port Said.

On the night of 15–16 November 1969, Egyptian Navy frogmen attacked the port of Eilat and caused severe damages to the armed transport ship Bat Yam. On 5–6 February 1970, the frogmen attacked the Israeli landing ships at the same port and same piers causing severe damages to the landing ship Bait Shivaa and transport armed ship Hydroma. On 8 March 1970, the frogmen attacked the Israeli oil drill Keting at the port of Abidjan in Ivory Coast believing that Israel had bought this oil drill from the Netherlands for the purposes of oil exploration in the Suez Gulf.

In the Yom Kippur War, Egypt blocked commercial traffic to Eilat in the Gulf of Aqaba by laying mines; it also attempted to blockade Israeli ports on the Mediterranean. The navy also used the coastal artillery to the east of Port Fouad to support the Egyptian Army in order to prepare for the assault on the Suez Canal. In the Battle of Baltim, three Egyptian Osa-class missile boats were sunk.

== Ranks ==
Officers

Rank group	General/flag officers				Senior officers			Junior officers
Egyptian Navy
Egyptian Navy	فريق أول; Fariq 'awal	فريق; Fariq	لواء; Liwa	عميد; Amid	عقيد; Aqid	مقدم; Muqaddam	رائد; Ra'id	نقيب; Naqib	ملازم أول; Mulazim awwal	ملازم; Mulazim

Enlisted

Rank group	Senior NCOs				Junior NCOs	Enlisted
Egyptian Navy
Egyptian Navy	مساعد أول; Mosa'id awwal	مساعد; Mosa'id	رقيب أول; Raqib awwal	رقيب; Raqib	عريف 'arif	جندي; Jundi

== Flags ==
Ensign

Flag

Pennant

=== Rank flags ===
Vice-admiral

Rear-admiral

Senior on the roads

== Bases ==
=== Mediterranean ===
The Egyptian navy's headquarters and main base is at Alexandria on the Mediterranean Sea with other Mediterranean naval bases at Port Said, Garoub and Mersa Matruh.

=== Red Sea ===
Egyptian naval bases on the Red Sea are Hurghada, Safaga, Berenice, and Suez.

== Present fleet ==
The Egyptian Navy is structured into two different fleets, one for the Mediterranean sea and the other for the Red Sea. This in a context where the safety of shipping in the Red Sea is becoming increasingly important.

=== Ships ===
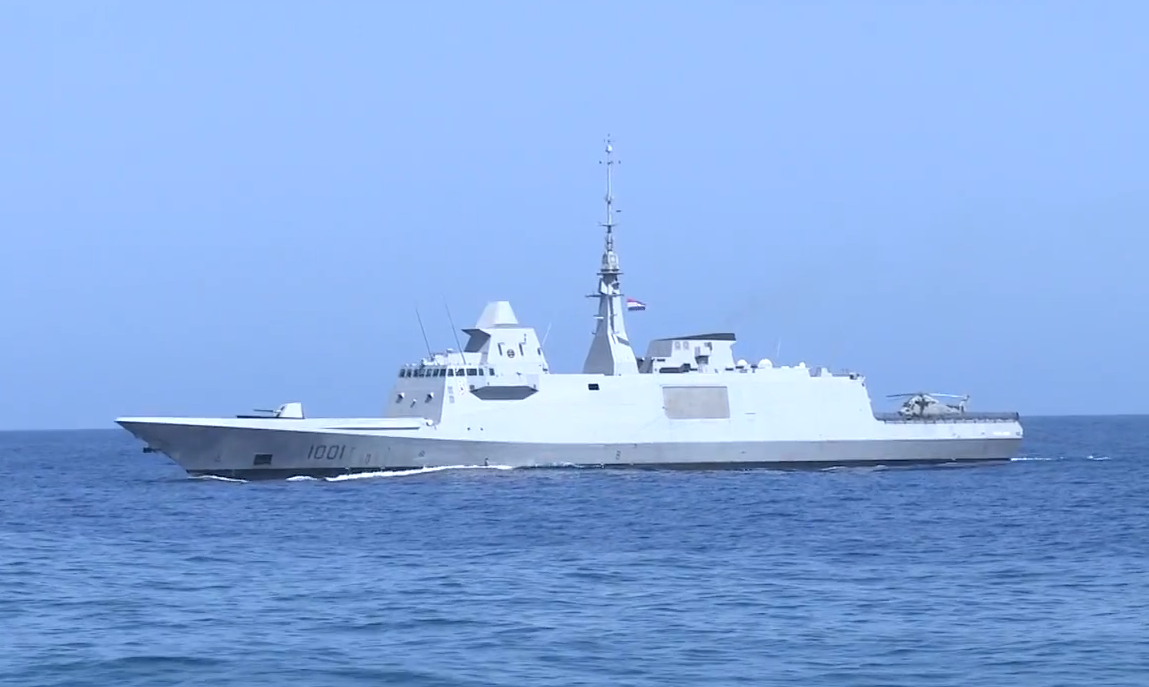
FREMM multipurpose frigate Tahya Misr during "Zat Al-Sawari" naval maneuver concluded in 2016.

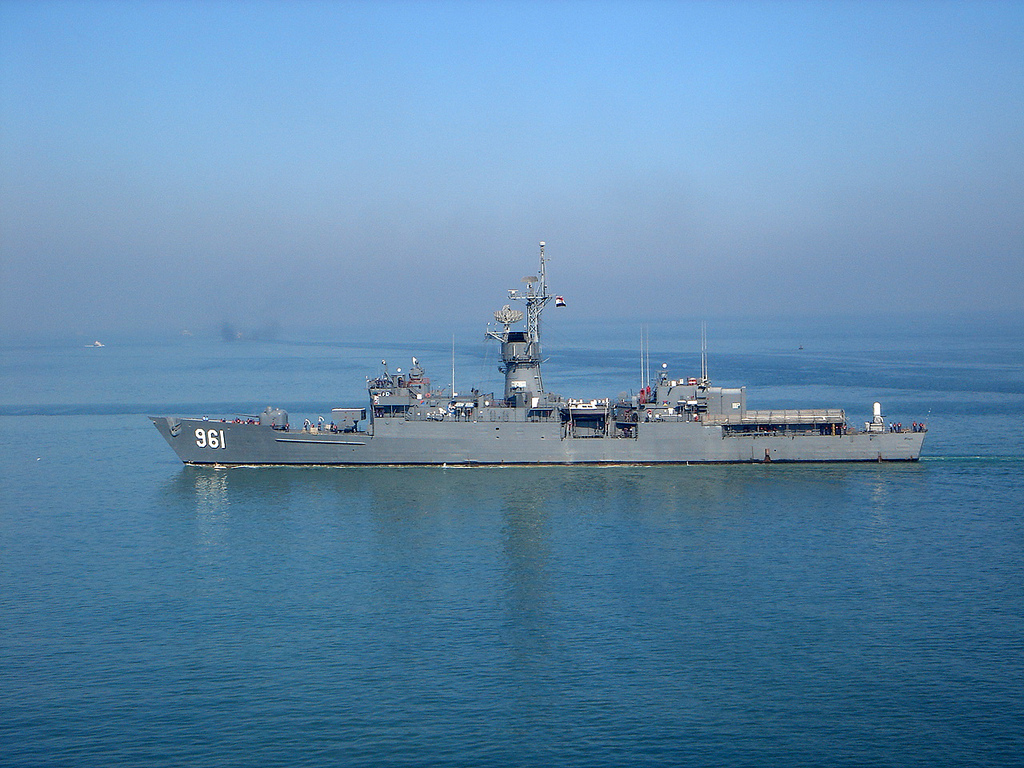
Knox-class frigate

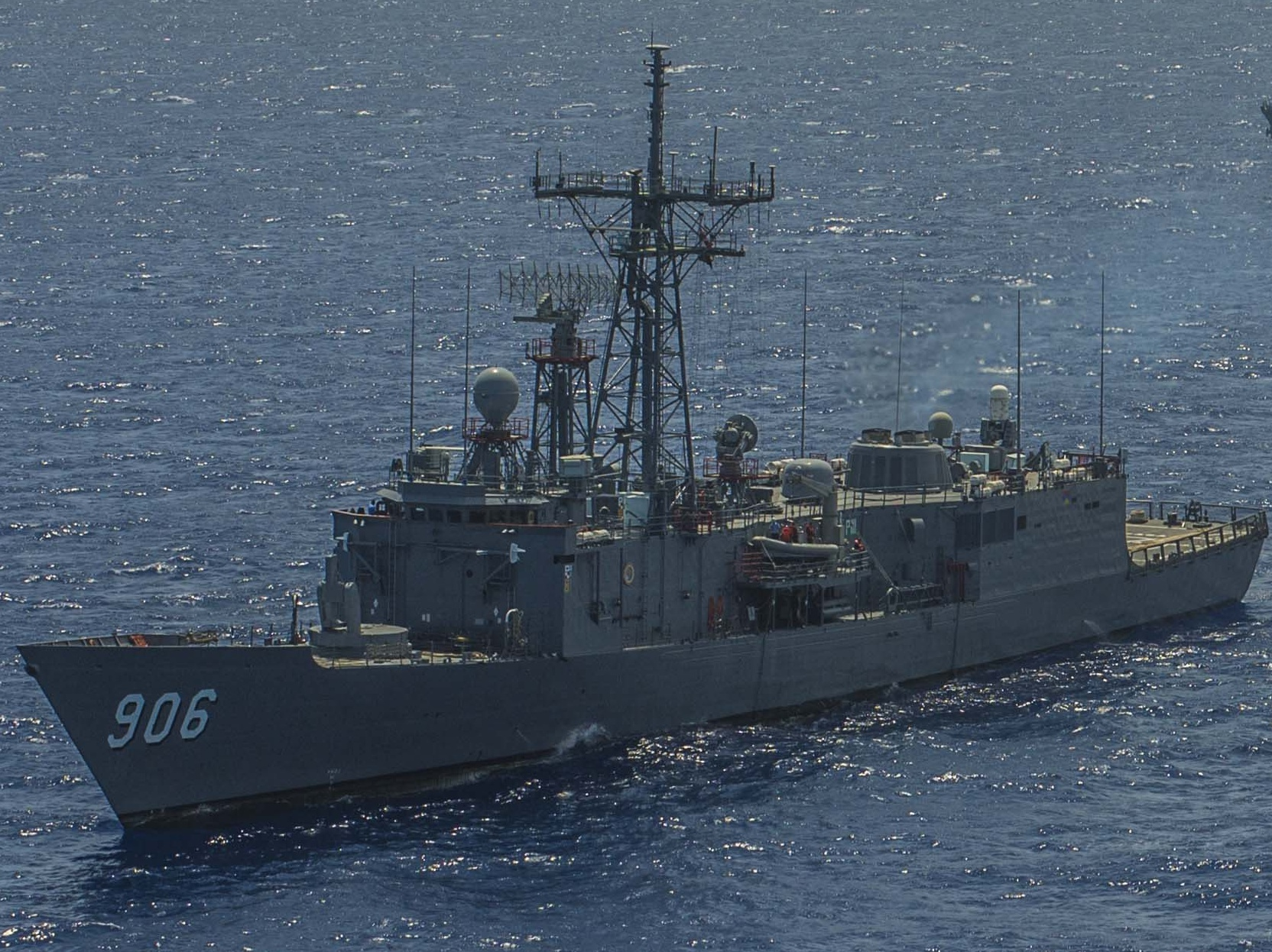
Oliver Hazard Perry-class frigate

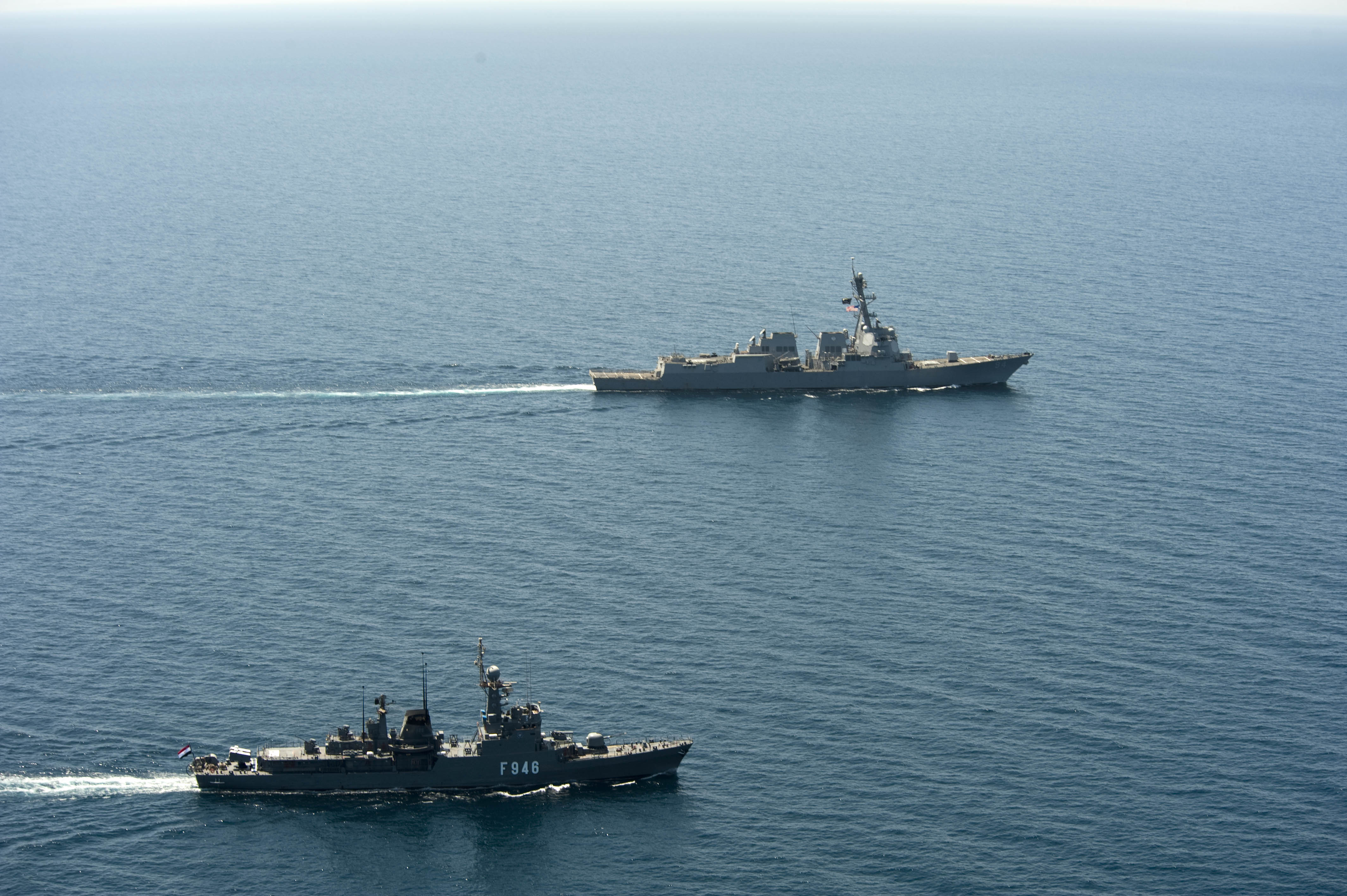
US and Egyptian Navy train together during Operation Bright Star 12

=== Aircraft ===
The navy lacked its own air arm and depended on the air force for maritime reconnaissance and protection against submarines. The air force's equipment that supported the navy included twelve Gazelle and five Sea King helicopters mounted with antiship and antisubmarine missiles. In mid-1988 the air force also took delivery of the first of six Grumman E-2c Hawkeye aircraft with search and side-looking radar for maritime surveillance purposes.

The Egyptian Air Force equipment that supports the navy includes the following:

- 9 Aérospatiale Gazelle, used for naval shore reconnaissance.
- 10 Kaman SH-2G Super Seasprite (with 3 additional used as spares), armed with Anti submarine torpedoes.
- 5 Westland Sea King helicopters mounted with antiship missiles and antisubmarine torpedoes.

In mid-1988 the air force also took delivery of the first of 6 Grumman E-2C Hawkeye aircraft, now 8 units are operational and are used to secure the maritime borders among other missions; it also operates 6 Beechcraft 1900C aircraft for maritime surveillance purposes with search and side-looking radar. The Egyptian Navy also uses Mil Mi-8 and Sea King helicopters to transport troops. also Russia confirmed the sale of 46 Ka-52Ks to Egypt in December 2015. Russian Helicopters Director-General Alexander Mikheyev said deliveries to Egypt are expected to occur in 2017. In April 2019 Egyptian Navy ordered 24 Agusta Westland AW149 helicopters

=== Submarine fleet ===
Egypt has 4 Type 209 German submarines and also operates 4 ex-Chinese Romeo-class submarines which have been revitalized to use Western periscopes, trailing GPS, passive sonars, a fire control system, and the ability to fire US-made Harpoon missiles.

=== Amphibious fleet ===
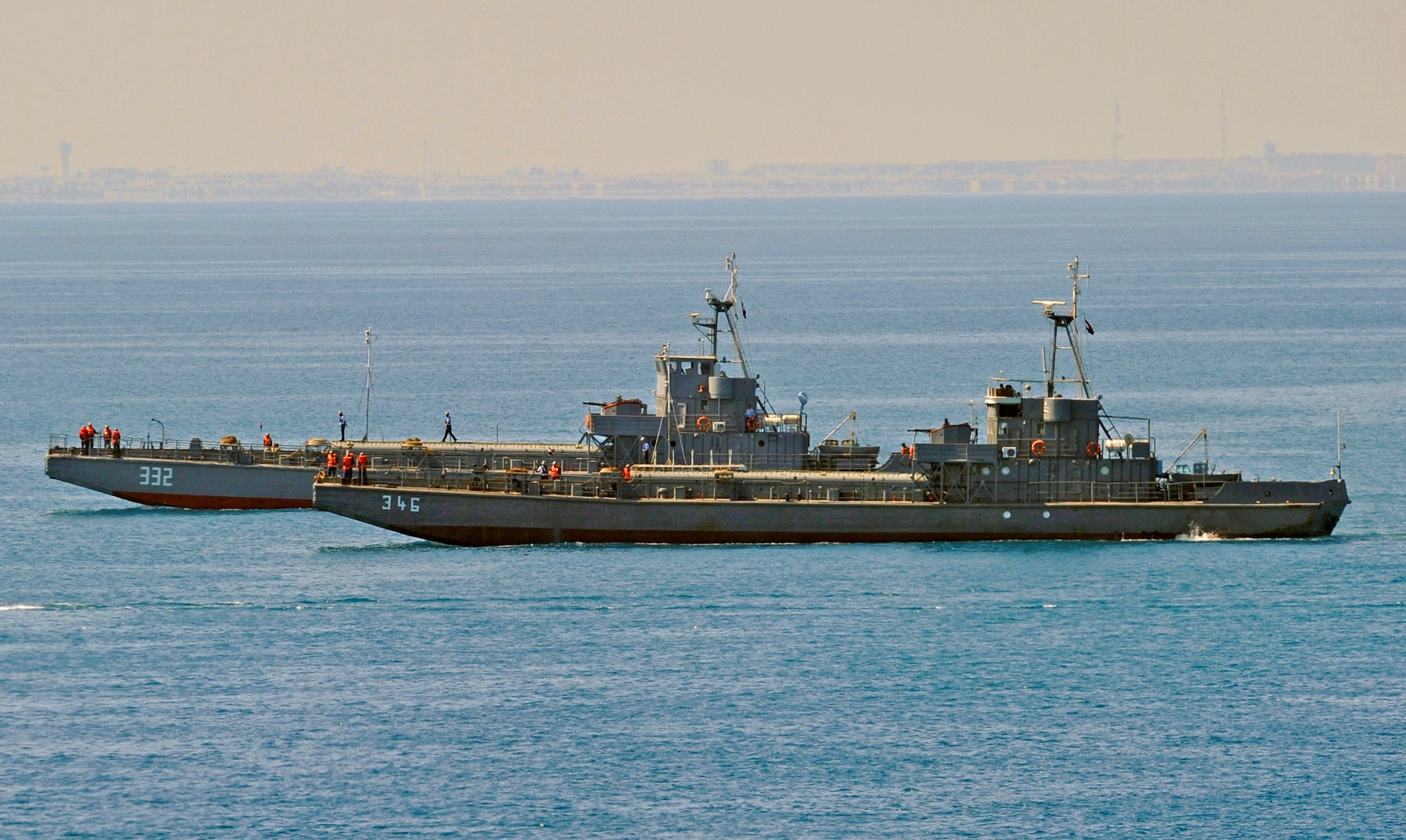
Two Egyptian navy amphibious landing craft in 2009

The first Mistral helicopter carrier named after late President Gamal Abdel-Nasser arrived in Alexandria in June 2016. On 16 September 2016, the Egyptian Navy Commander, Admiral Osama Rabie, raised the Egyptian flag on board of the BPC-210 Mistral-class amphibious assault ship (BPC/LHD). Russia and Egypt had signed a deal for Egypt's purchase of 50 Ka-52 Alligator attack helicopters from Russia. The purchase includes the variant of the Ka-52 Katran, which was specifically designed for the Mistrals that Russia had intended to acquire.

=== Surface fleet ===
Only those escorts capable of operating troop-lift helicopters (Kaman SH-2G Seasprite) are shown. It must, though, be accepted that all surface ships can launch and recover the rubber assault craft known to be used by the army's commando groups. Additionally the two, 1,702 ton Jianghu I class FFGs and the two, 1,479 ton Descubierta class FFGs can supply naval gunfire support.

=== Patrol forces ===
The Egyptian Navy has a fleet of fast attack craft, many fitted with missile systems. These and the navy-crewed vessels of the Coast Guard, would be deployed to support or prevent amphibious landings. The US shipbuilder Swiftships is one of the main providers of vessels for the Egyptian Navy. It has built around 30 boats for the Egyptian Navy mainly costal patrol crafts 28m for coastal defense, anti-surface operations, maritime security operations and maritime interdiction, surveillance and intelligence gathering, and search and rescue operations.

== Equipment ==
=== Surface-to-air missiles ===
- Aster 30 (FREMM multipurpose frigate - ENS Al-Galala - ENS Bernees)
- Aster 15 (FREMM multipurpose frigate - ENS Tahya Misr)
- MICA (Gowind-class MEKO 200)
- RIM-66 (Oliver Hazard Perry-class frigate)
- RIM-116 (Ambassador MK III missile boat)
- RIM-7 (Descubierta-class corvette)
- FIM-92 Stinger Avenger (Mistral-class landing helicopter dock)

==== Ship to ship/surface missiles ====
- P-270 Moskit with 120 km range and 320 kg payload (launched from P-32 Molniya-class missile boat).
- HY-1 with 85 km range and 513 kg payload (launched from Hegu-class coastal FAC/M).
- Harpoon Block II with more than 124 km range and 220 kg payload (launched from Ambassador-class FPB/M, Knox-class frigates, Oliver Hazard Perry-class frigates and Descubierta-class light frigates).
- Exocet (MM-40 Block 3) with >180 km range and 165 kg payload (launched from Gowind-class corvettes and FREMM-class frigates).
- Otomat Mk 2 Block III with >180 km range and 210 kg payload (launched from Ramadan-class FPB/M & October-class FAC/M).
- SS-N-2C Styx with 80 km range and 513 kg payload (launched from OSA I).

==== Surface to ship/surface missile (coastal defence) ====
- FL-1 with 150 km range and 513 kg payload.
- KSR-2 (AS-5 "Kelt") with 200 km range and 1000 kg payload. (Modified from air-launched version)
- Otomat MkII with >180 km range and 210 kg payload.
- Exocet (MM-40 MK III) with 180 km range and 165 kg payload.
- Bastion P with a range of 300 km and a speed of Mach 2.5 and 250 kg payload

== The Coast Guard ==
The Egyptian Coast Guard is responsible for the onshore protection of public installations near the coast and the patrol of coastal waters to prevent smuggling. Currently consists of one hundred five ships and craft.

=== Patrol boats ===
- 22 Timsah I/II class
- 12 Sea Spectre PB Mk III class
- 9 Swiftships 28m class
- 6 MV70 class
- 5 P-6 (Project 183) class
- 3 Textron class

=== Patrol craft ===
- 25 Swiftships 26m class
- 16 SR.N6 class
- 9 Type 83 class
- 6 Crestitalia class
- 12 Spectre class
- 12 Peterson class
- 5 Nisr class
- 29 DC-30 class
- 3 of 6 MRTP-20 Yonka Onuk MRTP-20 class

== Recent developments ==
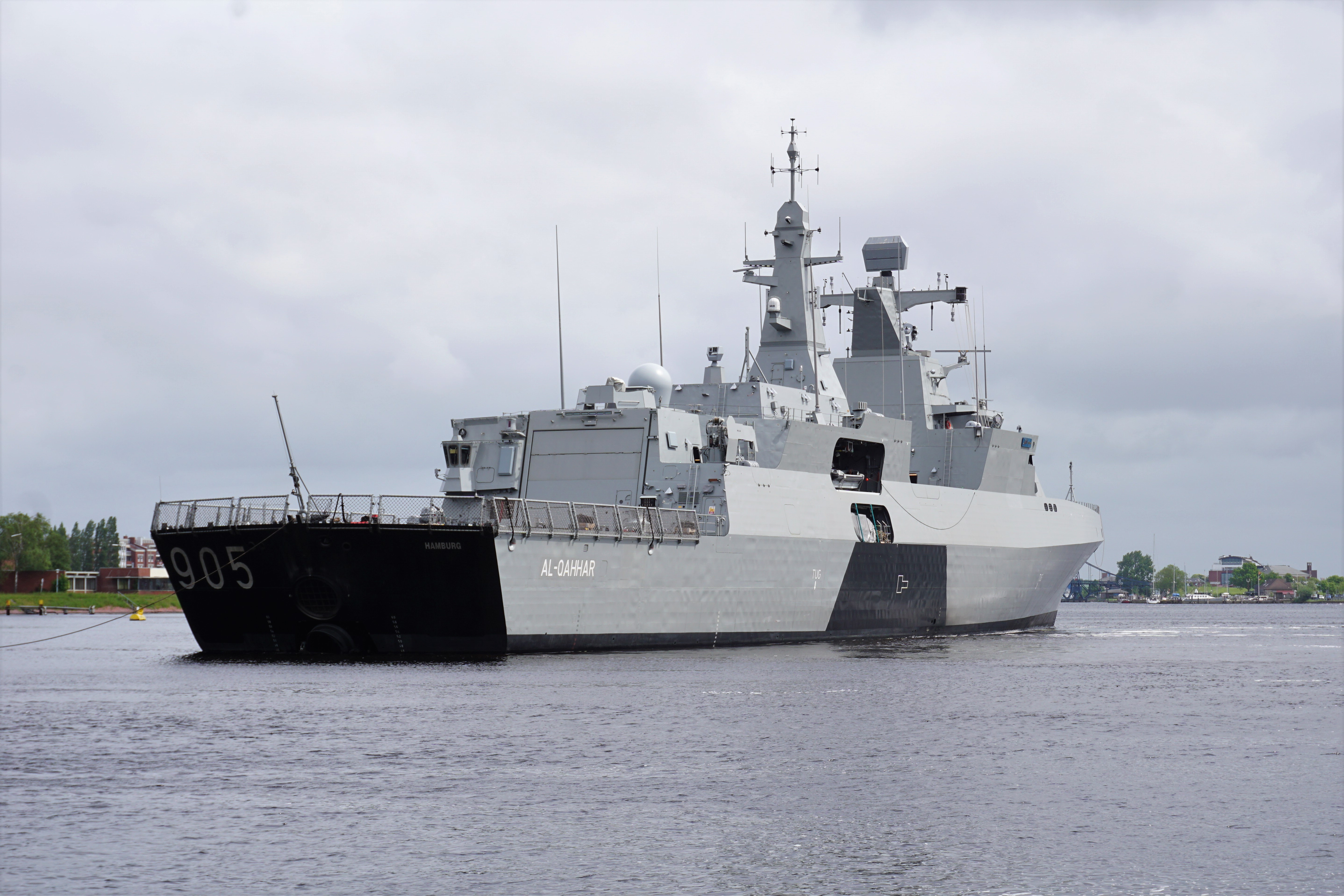
ENS Al-Qahhar, a MEKO A-200EN frigate in the Egyptian Navy

The Egyptian Navy has adopted the 60m diesel-powered Ambassador MK III fast missile patrol craft. The construction of the boats began in spring 2001. Egypt already had an older version of the Ambassador patrol craft in service, but the new boats would contain an update in design meant to make the vessels more resistant to radar detection. Design was conducted with the assistance of Lockheed Martin. Throughout recent years, Egypt has been constructing various Ramos-grade shipyards, which are capable of making more recent vessels like larger fast attack craft, low-grade aircraft carriers and nuclear submarines, though none of the aforementioned vessels have been constructed there.

The navy is currently undergoing a modernization of its surface fleet. On 16 February 2015, the Egyptian Navy ordered one FREMM multipurpose frigate from the French shipbuilder DCNS to enter service before the opening of the New Suez Canal, as part of a larger deal (including 24 Rafales and a supply of missiles) worth €5.2bn. Egypt has also signed a €1bn contract with DCNS to buy four Gowind 2,500-ton corvettes with an option for two more. The ageing submarine fleet is to be replaced starting in 2016 when the first of four Type 209 submarine's worth €920 million start arriving from Germany.

On 7 August 2015, Le Monde reported that Egypt and Saudi Arabia were in discussions with France to purchase the two amphibious assault ships of the Mistral class originally intended for Russia. Le Monde quoted a French diplomatic source as confirming that French President, François Hollande, discussed the matter with Egyptian President Abdel Fattah el-Sisi during his visit to Egypt during the inauguration of the New Suez Canal in Ismailia. On 24 September 2015, the French presidency announced that an agreement had been reached with Egypt for the supply of the two Mistrals.

In May 2016, Swiftships was awarded a Direct Commercial Contract (DCC) for the construction of six additional 28m CPCs for co-production in Egypt under Swiftships Build, Operate and Transfer (BOT) model. Swiftships has delivered six 28m CPCs already to the EN, which were constructed at the Egyptian Ship Building and Repairs Company (ESBRC) in Alexandria, Egypt. In June 2016 Swiftships was awarded a contract to procure four 28 meter long coastal patrol craft kits for local assembly in Alexandria.

Spiegel Online announced on 2 January 2019 that the German federal security council approved the sale of one MEKO 200 frigate similar to the South African Valour class for 500 million euros, Egypt also intends to buy at least another frigate of the class in the future. In May 2016, Swiftships was awarded a Direct Commercial Contract (DCC) for the construction of six additional 28m CPCs

In April 2019, the German parliament approved the guarantee of 2.3 billion euros for the sale of six MEKO A200 frigates for Egypt.

In 2020, the Italian government accepted the proposal to sell two Bergamini-class frigates to Egypt for a value of 1.2 billion euros.

On 3 July 2021, President Abdel Fattah al-Sisi inaugurated the "July 3 base" at Gargoub, Matrouh Governorate.

In October 2021, it was announced that the UK government had authorised the sale of two withdrawn Fort (I)-class replenishment vessels to Egypt, pending full refurbishment.

In April 2022 Swiftships was awarded another contract for six 28m Coastal Patrol Craft material production kits, Zodiac RIBS, and equipment under a US Foreign Military Sales (FMS) case to Egypt. Swiftships' 28m boat has a range of 900 nmi, which can be extended by afloat refuelling.

== Commanders ==
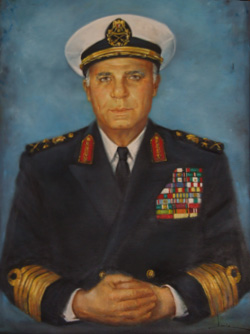
Fouad Mohamed Abou Zikry, Commander in Chief of the Egyptian Navy between 1967–1969 and 1972–1976.

=== Egypt Eyalet Navy ===
- Sealord / Muharram Bek
- Sealord / Osman Nur Al Din Pasha
- Sealord / Mustafa Motawash Pasha
- Sealord / Sa'id of Egypt
- Sealord / Hassan Pasha al-Iskandarani

=== Khedival Navy ===
- Hafiz Khalil Pasha (1861–1864)
- Abdul Latif Pasha (1864–1871)
- Shahin Pasha (1871–1873)
- Tusun Pasha (1873–1882)

=== 20th century ===
After the Egyptian defeat in the Anglo-Egyptian war, the UK abolished the entire military of Egypt and established a small homeland defence force instead even the Navy was abolished and the only maritime force in Egypt was the Coast Guard. In 1908 the Naval Authority was formed as a semi replacement for the former Navy, and was used to control the Egyptian ports and Merchant ships there. In the late 1920s and early 1930s, and after Egypt's independence in 1922 Egypt started building a new modern Navy with British vessels (destroyers, patrol boats, training ships) all under the name 'Naval Authority'. Although a Navy existed but no Naval academy was formed, however, it had a section in the main Military academy. After World War II ended, in 1946, the Naval Authority was renamed into "The Royal Egyptian Navy".

- Vice Admiral Mahmoud Hamza Pasha (6 June 1946 – 1 October 1948)
- Vice Admiral Ahmed Bek Badr (2 October 1948 – 30 September 1951)
- Vice Admiral Mahmoud Bek Badr (1 October 1951 – 27 July 1952)
- Vice Admiral Mohamed Nashid (28 July 1952 – 14 September 1952)
- Vice Admiral Suleiman Ezzat (15 September 1952 – 10 June 1967)
- Admiral Fouad Mohamed Abou Zikry (11 June 1967 – 11 September 1969)
- Rear Admiral Mahmoud Abd Al-Rahman Fahmy (12 September 1969 – 24 October 1972)
- Admiral Fouad Mohamed Abou Zikry (24 October 1972 – 15 October 1976)
- Vice Admiral Ashraf Refaat
- Vice Admiral Mohamed Ali Mohamed
- Vice Admiral Ali Tawfik Gad (April 1983 – October 1987)
- Vice Admiral Sherif Alsadek (October 1987 – October 1990)
- Vice Admiral Ahmed Fadel
- Vice Admiral Ahmed Saber Selim
- Vice Admiral Tamer Abd Al-Alim (October 2005 – October 2007)
- Vice Admiral Mohab Mamish (October 2007 – 11 August 2012)
- Vice Admiral Osama El-Gendi (14 August 2012 – 12 April 2015 )
- Vice Admiral Osama Rabie (13 April 2015 – 16 December 2016) He studied at the Egyptian Naval Academy and graduated in 1977.
- Vice Admiral Ahmed Khaled Hassan Saeed (17 December 2016 – 14 December 2021)
- Vice Admiral Ashraf Ibrahim Atwa (14 December 2021 – 3 July 2025)
- Vice Admiral Mahmoud Adel Fawzy (4 July 2025 – present)

== See also ==
- Ancient Egyptian navy
- Ptolemaic navy
- Fatimid navy
- Battle of Navarino
- List of ships of the Egyptian Navy

== Sources ==
- Blankinship, Khalid Yahya (1994). The End of the Jihâd State: The Reign of Hishām ibn ʻAbd al-Malik and the Collapse of the Umayyads. Albany, New York: State University of New York Press. ISBN 978-0-7914-1827-7.
- Kubiak, Władyslaw B. (1970). "The Byzantine Attack on Damietta in 853 and the Egyptian Navy in the 9th Century". Byzantion. 40: 45–66. ISSN 0378-2506.
- Lev, Yaacov (1984). "The Fāṭimid Navy, Byzantium and the Mediterranean Sea, 909–1036 CE/297–427 AH". Byzantion. 54: 220–252. ISSN 0378-2506.
