= France–Greece relations =

- France: Greece

Diplomatic mission
- Embassy of France, Athens: Embassy of Greece, Paris

France–Greece relations, or Franco–Greek relations, are foreign relations between France and Greece. In modern history, both countries established diplomatic relations in 1833, three years after Greek Independence. France and Greece, due to strong cultural and historical ties, have had a traditionally strong and special relationship and strategic alliance for decades and today enjoy strong diplomatic relations also.

The two countries are EU, NATO and UN member states and cooperate in many other multilateral organizations, such as the La Francophonie, the Organization for Security and Co-operation in Europe and the Union for the Mediterranean.

In September 2021, the two countries signed a military agreement according to which each country is engaged to the military aid of the other in the event of a war with a third country. The agreement was extended for another five years in 2026, including a clause for automatic renewal thereafter.

== History ==
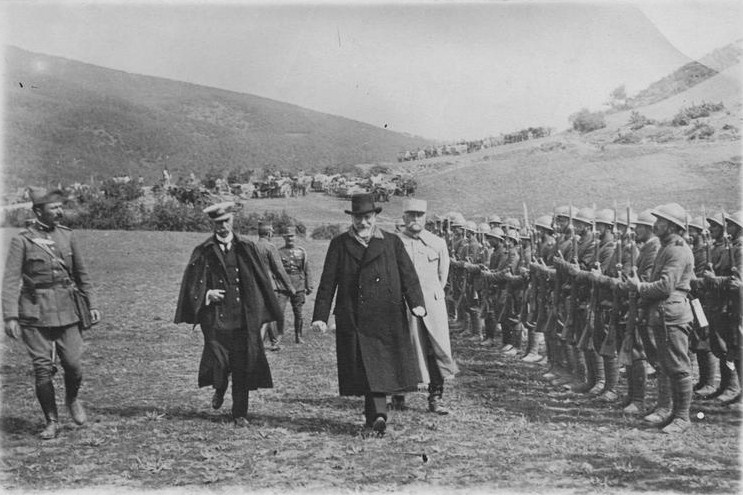
Eleftherios Venizelos with admiral Kountouriotis and the French General Maurice Sarrail review a section of the Allied Army at the Macedonian front during WWI.

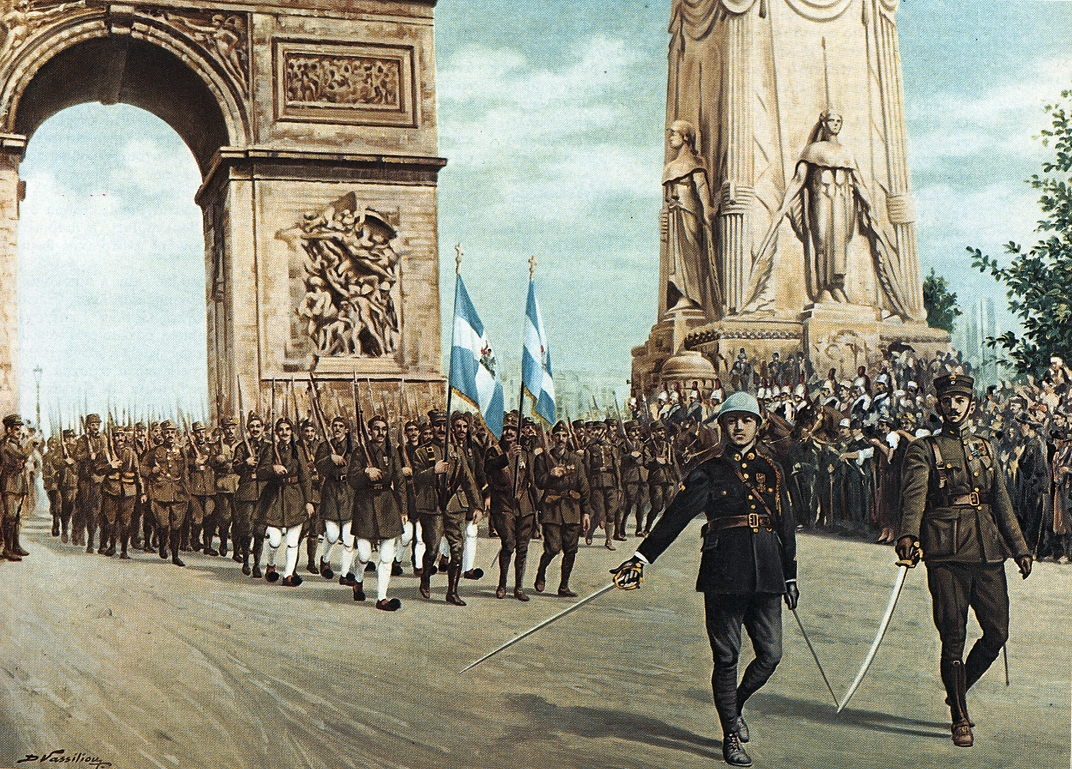
Painting depicting Greek military units in the WWI Victory Parade in Arc de Triomphe in Paris in July 1919

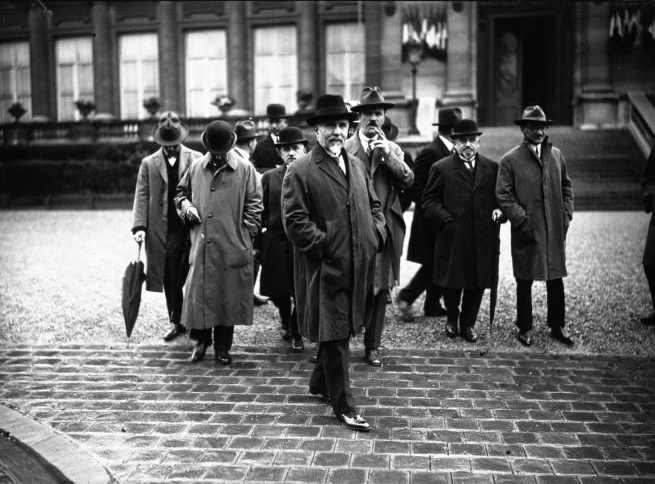
The Greek ambassador to France, Alexandros Karapanos, during the discussions in Paris at the League of Nations in 1925

Relations stretch back to Classical Antiquity, when Ancient Greek colonies (see Greeks in pre-Roman Gaul) were established in pre-Roman Gaul, the most important of which being Massilia (Greek: Μασσαλία, French: Marseilles), located in southeastern France (which today is one of the country's oldest city, as well as the second largest, by population). From Massilia and other Greek colonies, Greek goods and elements of the Greek civilization, including coins, spread inland (see Greeks in pre-Roman Gaul). The Gauls in turn became a part of the Hellenistic world proper after the 3rd century BC, following the Gallic invasion of the Balkans and their establishment in Galatia in Asia Minor.

In the Middle Ages, French crusaders played a major role in the Fourth Crusade and set up several states in Greece following the dissolution of the Byzantine Empire in 1204. This began the period known as Frankokratia ("Frankocracy") in Greece. The main French Crusader states were the Principality of Achaea and the Duchy of Athens, while the other West European states were mostly Italian (Lombard, Venetian or Genoese).

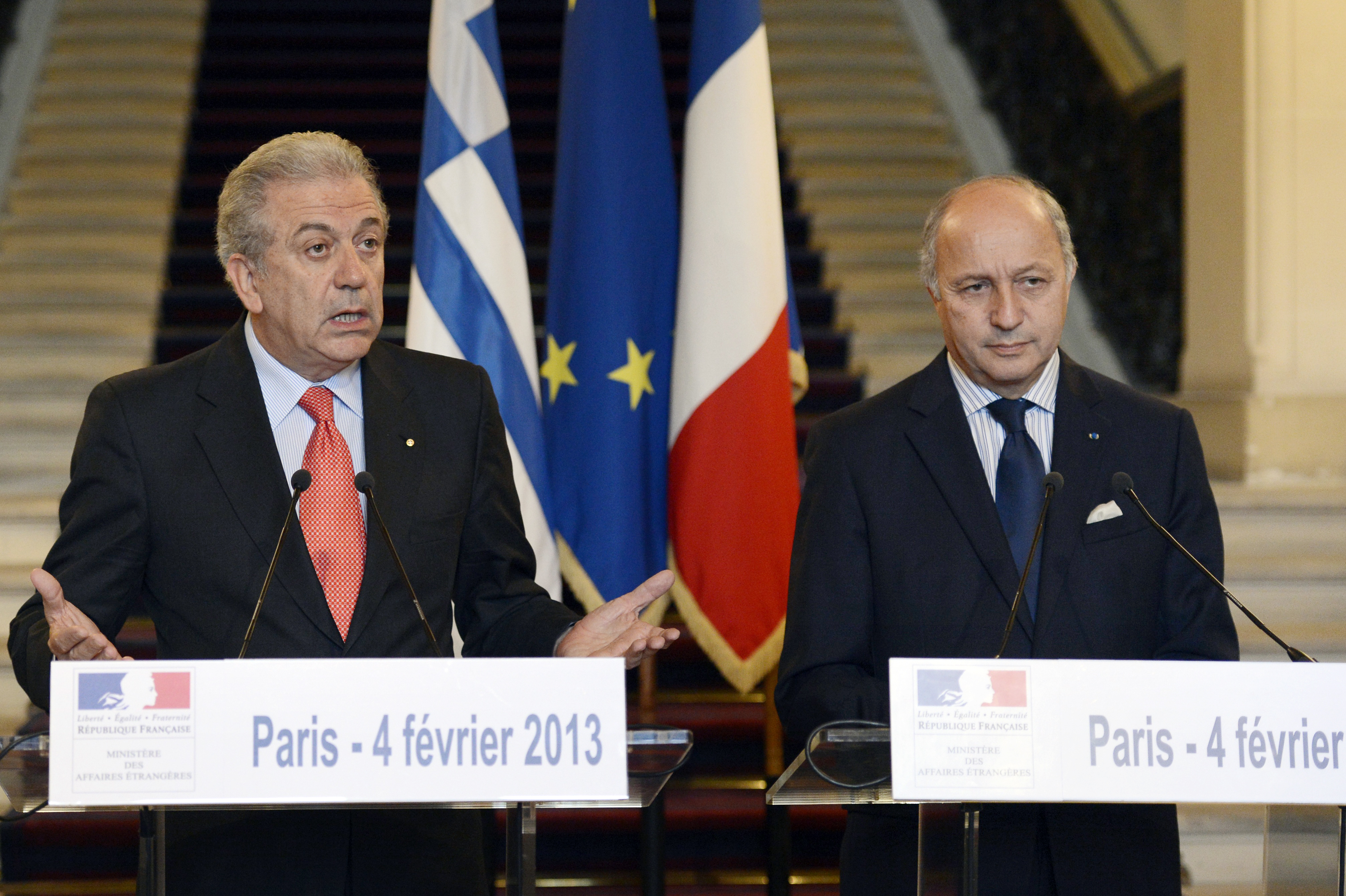
Greek Foreign Minister Dimitris Avramopoulos and French Foreign Minister Laurent Fabius in a joint press conference in Paris in February 2013

In the modern age, the French Enlightenment and the ideas of the French Revolution influenced the main thinkers of the Modern Greek Enlightenment, such as Adamantios Korais (who lived in France) and Rigas Feraios, and formed the ideological groundwork for the Greek War of Independence. French troops also occupied the Ionian Islands during the Napoleonic Wars, paving the way for the first independent Greek state of modern times, the Septinsular Republic. During the Greek War of Independence that began in 1821, French Philhellenes played an important role, providing much-needed military expertise and propagating the cause of Greek independence abroad. Among the most important was Charles Nicolas Fabvier, an organizer of the modern Greek regular army. French ships also took part in the crucial Battle of Navarino, which secured Greek independence, and a French expeditionary corps landed in Greece in 1828 to help clear the country of remaining Ottoman garrisons.

Along with Great Britain and Russia, France became one of the guarantor powers of the independent Kingdom of Greece. This was reflected in Greek domestic politics during the reign of King Otto, where a French Party vied for influence with the rival English and Russian parties. Britain gradually assumed the dominant position in Greek affairs after the 1860s, but France still retained a measure of influence, especially on cultural and military affairs. French military missions were called to modernize the Greek military (in 1884–87 and 1911–14). Until the first decades of the 20th century, the French language was the only compulsory foreign language in Greek schools, being the most spoken foreign language among Greeks.

France also played a leading role in the effort to bring Greece into World War I, involving itself in the "National Schism" on the side of Prime Minister Eleftherios Venizelos. French troops, working together with the Venizelists confronted against the royalist forces in Athens, and finally, in June 1917, helped depose the Germanophile King Constantine. After the Great Fire of Thessaloniki, a French architectural commission under Ernest Hébrard took over a modern city plan for the city.

The pro-Greek policies of the French government, such as the pro-French policies of Greece, however, were reversed after Venizelos' electoral defeat in November 1920 and the return of Constantine, after which France supported Kemal Atatürk's Turkish nationalists in their war against Greece.

The two nations were Allies also during World War II. Some Greeks were imprisoned in subcamps of the Natzweiler-Struthof concentration camp in German-occupied France.

Many political exiles, mostly leftists, found also refuge in France during the Greek military junta.

== Bilateral relations and cooperation ==
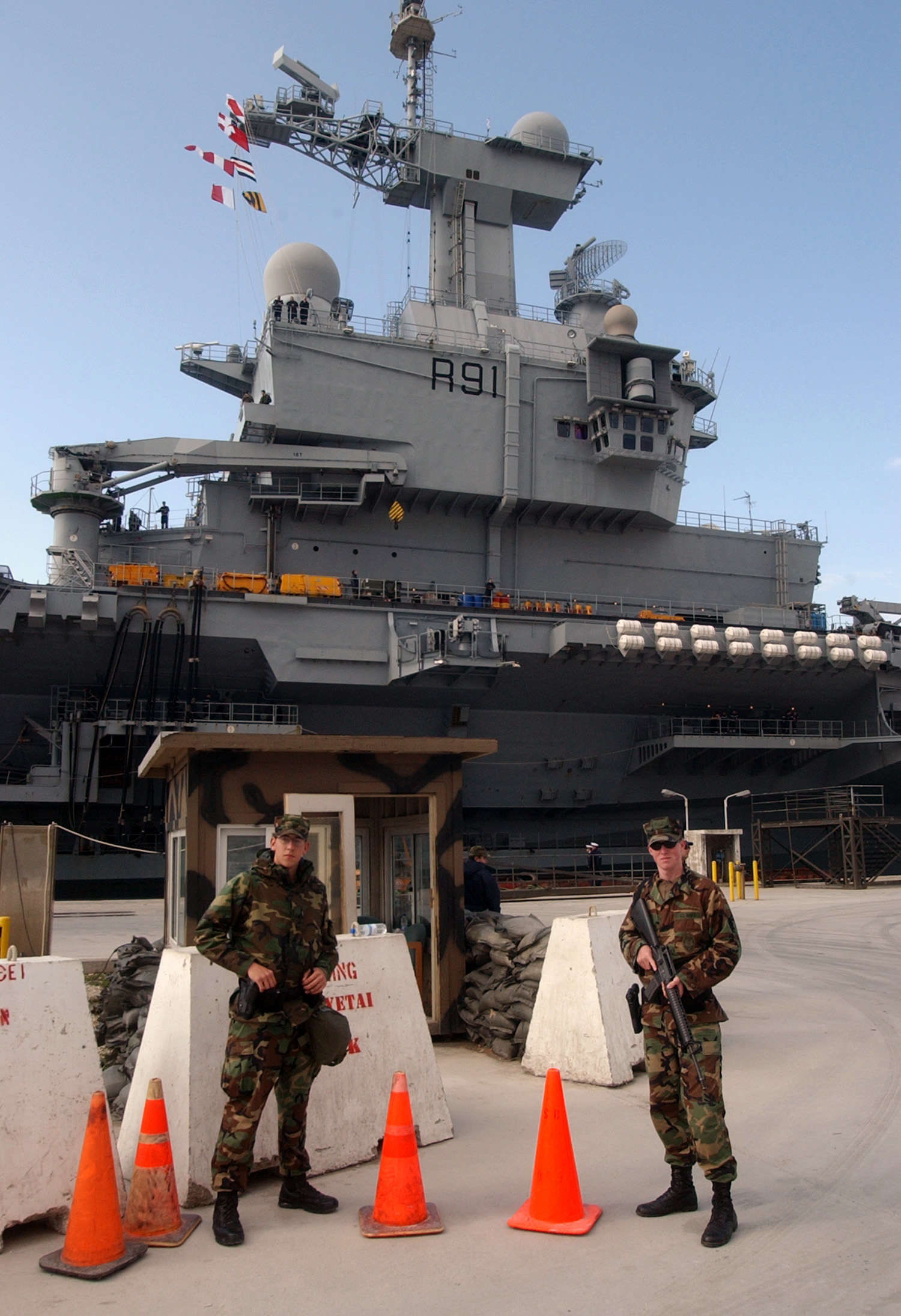
The French aircraft carrier FS Charles DeGaulle (R 91) as it docks at Greece's Souda Bay in 2003

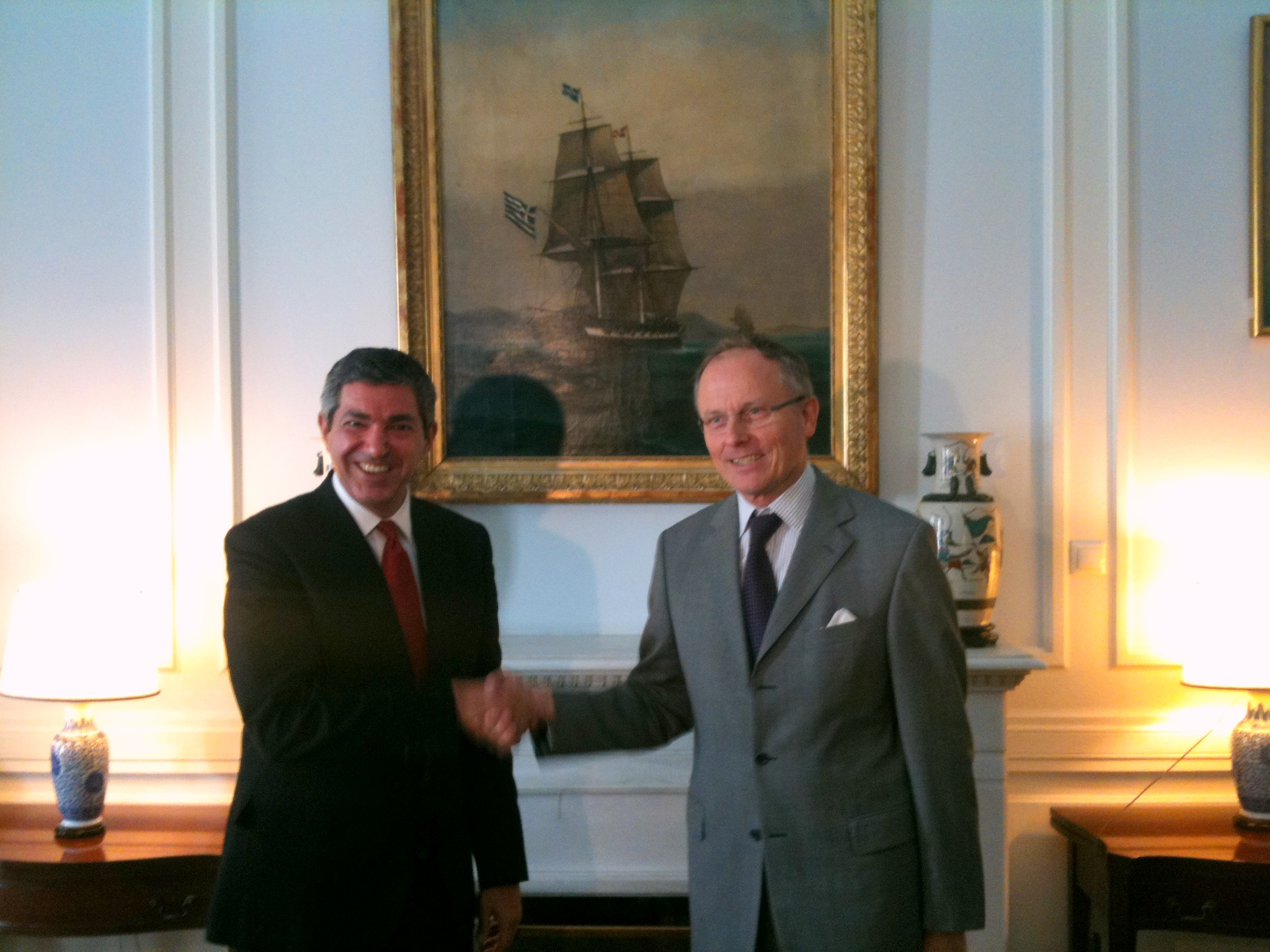
Foreign Minister of Greece Stavros Lambrinidis with French Ambassador Jean-Loup Kuhn-Delforge in October 2011

France and Greece were allies during both World Wars, the Korean War and the Cold War, and have never been adversaries of each other. The two countries have had a friendly and strategic alliance for decades and are full members of many international organizations, including the UN, the European Union, NATO, WTO and OSCE. Greece has been a full member of the Francophonie organization since 2004. There are regular high-level visits between the two countries, and frequent contacts between the two heads of state. France and Greece are co-operating in many fields, including cultural, scientific, judicial and military. Several Greek cities, and most notably Argos and Athens, are the seats for French Schools of Archaeological and Historical studies, where students from both countries study and co-operate in the fields of Archaeology and History.

Of the unique foreign leaders that have addressed the Greek Parliament in recent history, three have been French presidents (De Gaulle, Sarkozy, and Hollande), the others being US presidents Dwight D. Eisenhower, and George H.W. Bush.

=== Military cooperation ===
France and Greece have a very close military cooperation, with both countries annually participating in various military drills and exercises in the Eastern Mediterranean, along with other countries like Italy, Egypt and Israel. Such exercises include the Medusa 2016, and the Operation Bright Star. Additionally, the French Navy and the Hellenic Navy are cooperating closely on matters concerning the security of the broader Mediterranean region, with the flagship of the French Navy, the aircraft carrier Charles DeGaulle occasionally paying visits to Greece's Souda Bay Naval Base, the only deep-sea port capable of supporting the largest aircraft carriers in the entire region.

Greece has in modern times bought a number of French weapons systems: the La Combattante IIa, IIIa, and IIIb fast attack craft, the AMX-30 tanks and AMX-10P personnel carriers, and the Mirage F1C and Mirage 2000 fighter jets. In 2009, the purchase of six FREMM frigates was announced, but never realised due to the Greek debt crisis. In 2019, negotiations began between the Greek and French governments for the purchase of BELH@RRA-type frigates. On 12 September 2020, Greek prime minister Kyriakos Mitsotakis announced an arms deal with France for the purchase of Dassault Rafale fighter aircraft and FREMM multipurpose frigates, as well as the recruitment of 15,000 additional troops, amid tensions with Turkey in the eastern Mediterranean. The 2.5-billion-euro arms deal includes 18 Rafale jets, 12 of them made by Dassault. In September 2021, Greece and France reached an agreement for the supply of FDI frigates and Gowind-class corvettes to the Hellenic Navy. This Franco-Greek defence agreement includes a mutual defence clause (article 2) should either be attacked by a third country. In 2026, during Emmanuel Macron’s visit to Athens, France and Greece renewed their Strategic Partnership Agreement in the field of defence and security. The agreement was extended for another five years. A key element remains the clause on mutual assistance in the event of a threat to either party's sovereignty.

=== Energy cooperation ===
The two countries also cooperate in the energy sector and are members of the East Mediterranean Gas Forum which aims at promoting regional cooperation on energy affairs.

== Greece France Alliance ==
The French and Greek flags at a harbour in Chania

The slogan "Grèce-France-Alliance" (also in Greek: Hellas Gallía Symmachía, Ελλάς Γαλλία Συμμαχία), traces its roots back to the political and diplomatic support aid France provided to Greece and Constantine Karamanlis at the time of the return to democracy in 1974, and nowadays is often used to denote the deep historical, cultural and political relations and close diplomatic cooperation between the two countries.

== High level visits ==
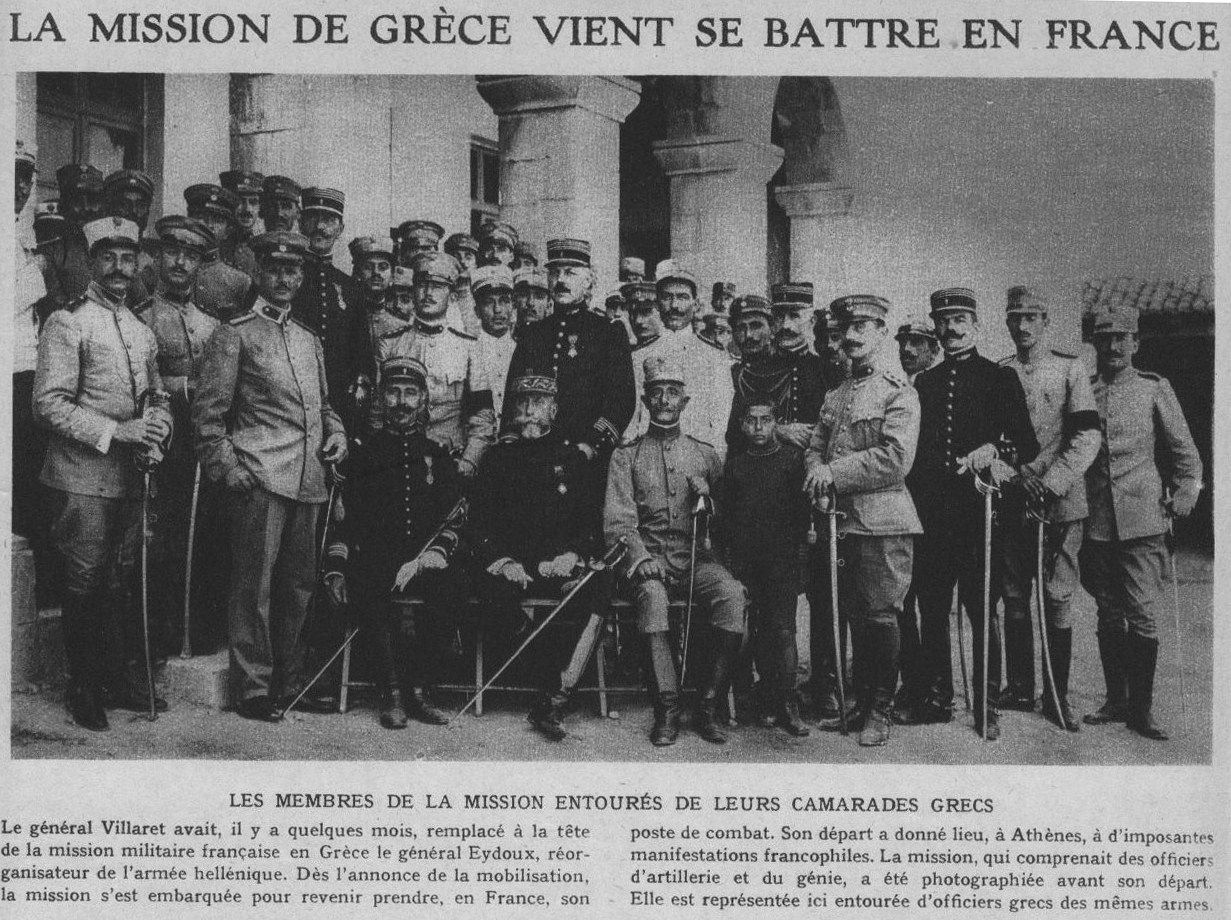
The French military mission to Greece (1911–1914) with Greek officers prior to its departure from Greece

- 1954; Official visit of Greek prime minister Alexandros Papagos to Paris.
- 1963; State visit of President of the French Republic Charles de Gaulle to Athens and Thessaloniki.
- 1975; Official visit of the French president Valery Giscard d'Estaing to Greece.
- 1979; Second visit of the French president Valery Giscard d'Estaing to Athens.
- 1982; Official visit of President of the French Republic François Mitterrand to Athens.
- November 2000; Official visit of President of the French Republic. Jacques Chirac to Athens.
- April 2003; Official visit of President of the French Republic Jacques Chirac to Thessalonica.
- June 2008; Official visit of President of the French Republic Nicolas Sarkozy to Athens.
- February 2013; Official visit of President of the French Republic François Hollande to Athens.
- October 2015; State visit of President of the French Republic Francois Hollande to Greece.
- September 2017; Official visit of President of the French Republic Emmanuel Macron to Athens.
- April 2026; Official visit of President of the French Republic Emmanuel Macron to Athens.

== Resident diplomatic missions ==
- France has an embassy in Athens and a consulate-general in Thessaloniki.
- Greece has an embassy in Paris and a consulate-general in Marseille.
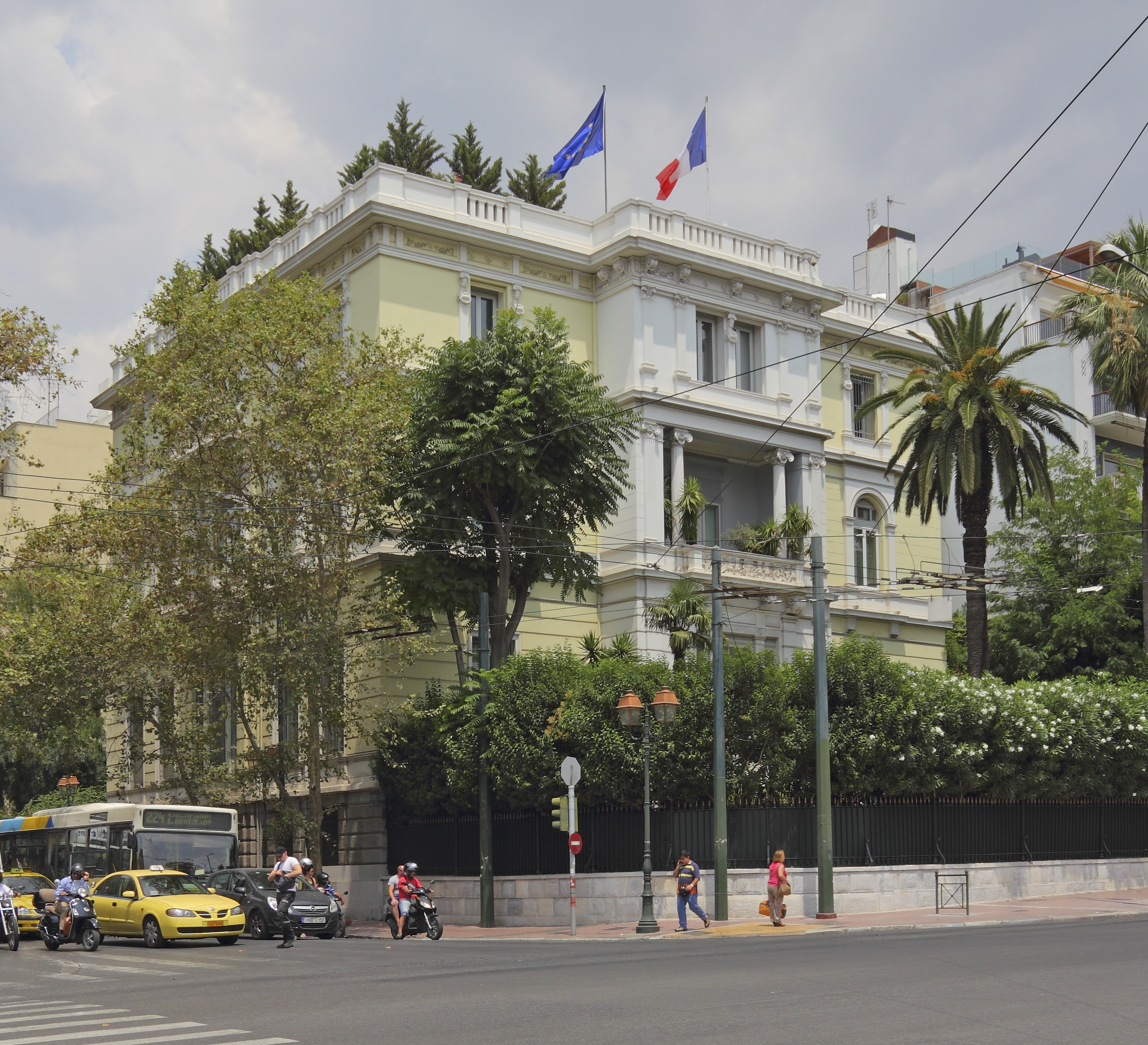
Embassy of France in Athens

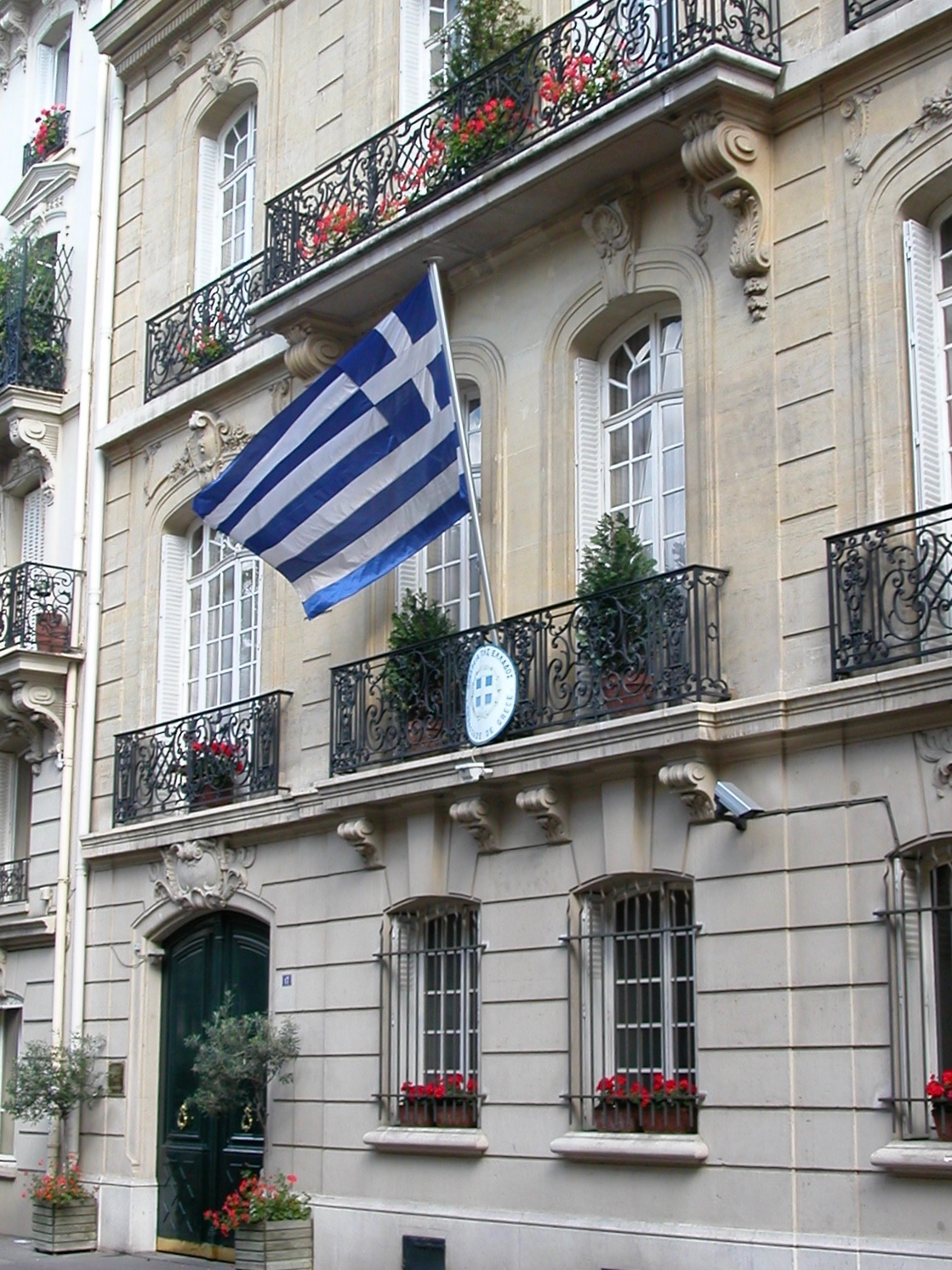
Embassy of Greece in Paris

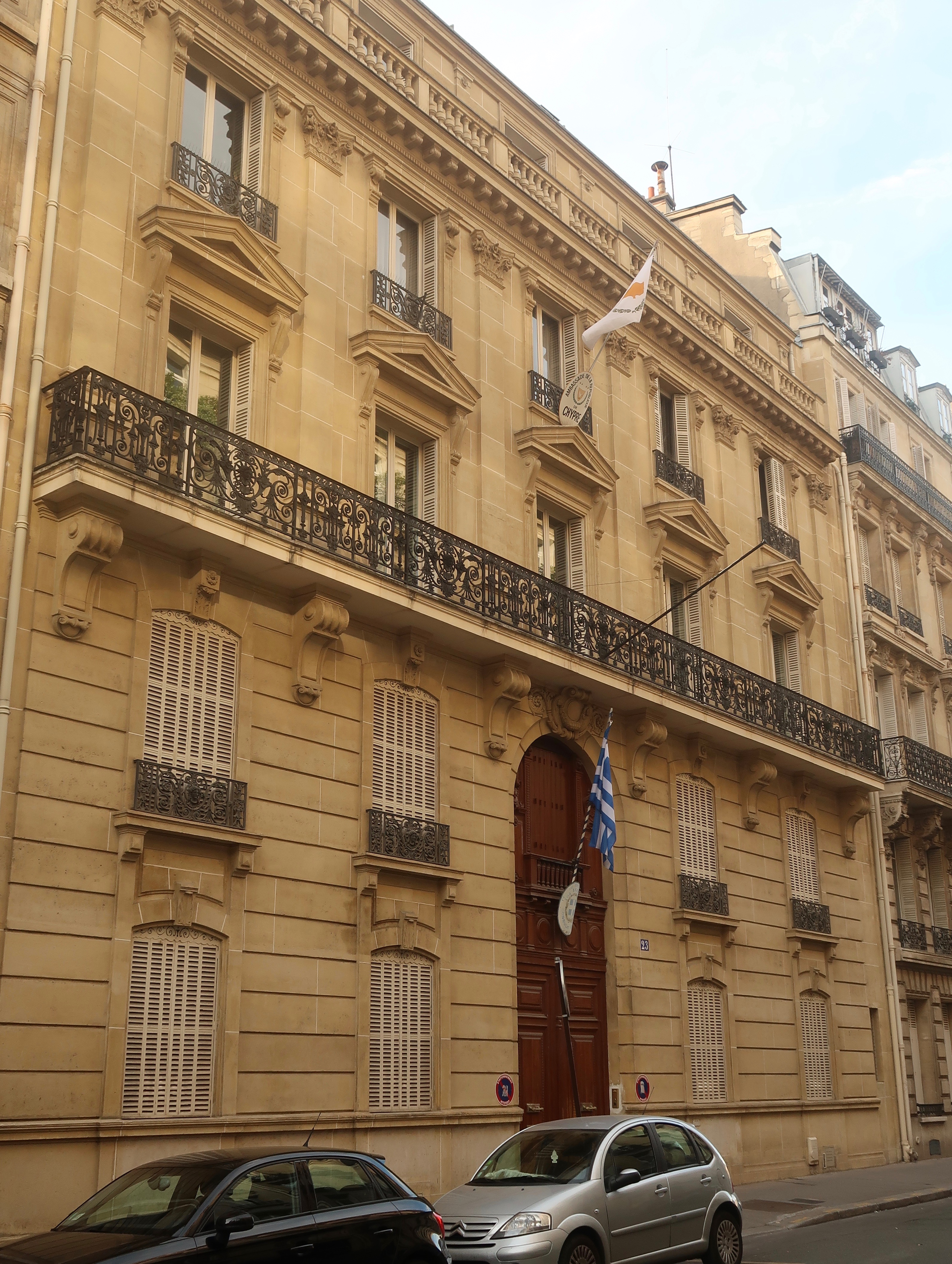
Consulate-General of Greece in Paris

== See also ==
- Foreign relations of France
- Foreign relations of Greece
- Greeks in France
- List of Ambassadors of France to Greece
