= La Combattante IIa-class fast attack craft =

Hellenic Navy vessels

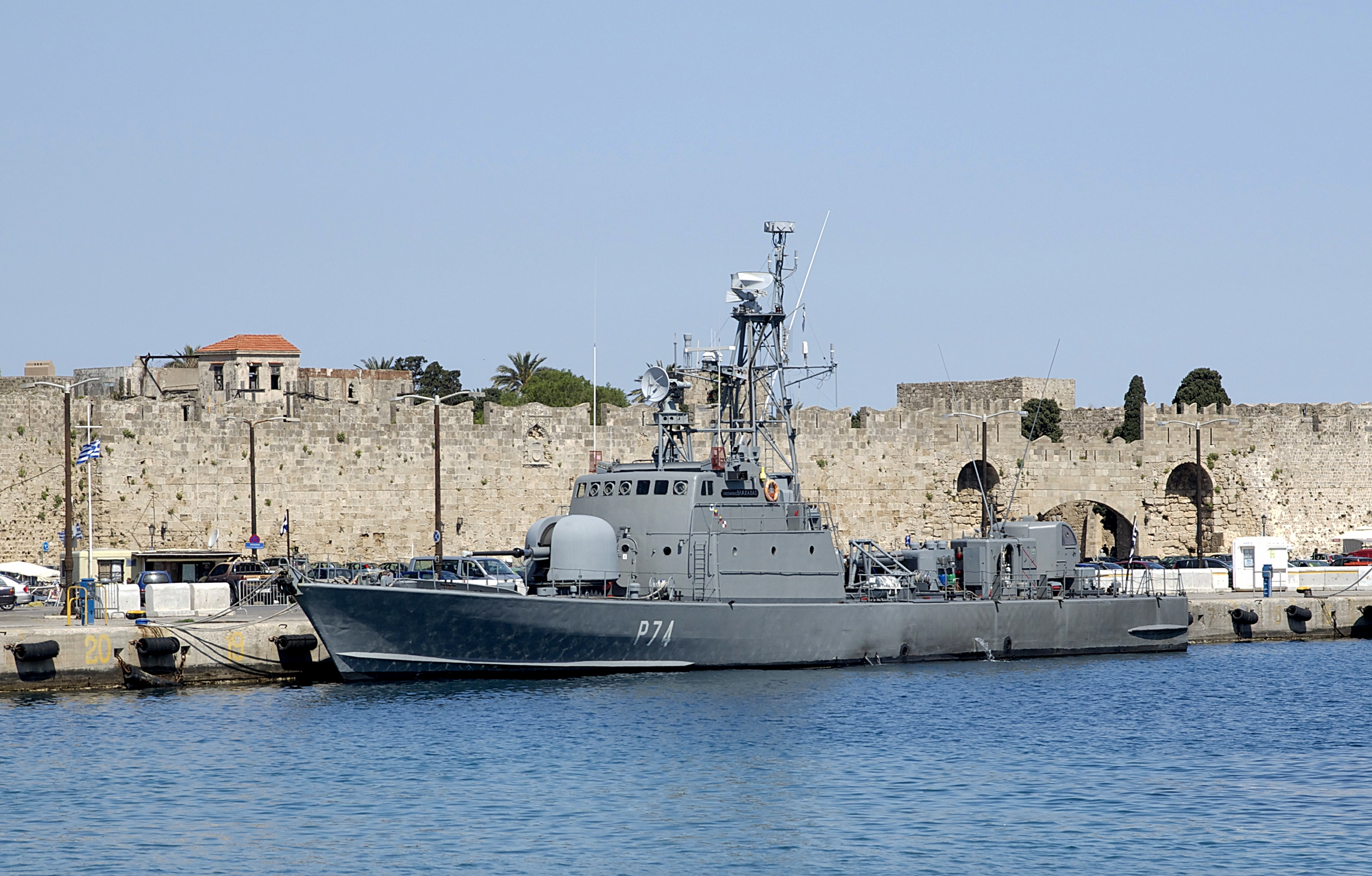
- Plotarchis Vlachavas at Rhodes Harbour

Class overview
- Builders: CMN Lurssen
- Operators: Hellenic Navy
- Succeeded by: La Combattante III class
- Built: 1973–1974
- In commission: 1973–present
- Completed: 6

General characteristics
- Type: Fast attack craft
- Displacement: 234 tons (standard); 265 tons (full load)
- Length: 47 m (154 ft)
- Beam: 8 m (26 ft)
- Draught: 2.1 m (7 ft)
- Installed power: 4 × MTU MD 16V 538 TB90; 12,000 hp (8,900 kW) (combined)
- Propulsion: Four shafts
- Speed: 36 knots (67 km/h; 41 mph) (maximum)
- Range: 570 nautical miles (1,060 km; 660 mi) at 30 knots (56 km/h; 35 mph); 1,600 nautical miles (3,000 km; 1,800 mi) at 15 knots (28 km/h; 17 mph)
- Complement: 30 (4 officers)
- Sensors & processing systems: Thomson-CSF Triton; G-band; Thomson-CSF Castor; I/J-band; CSEE Panda optical director
- Electronic warfare & decoys: Thomson-CSF DR 2000S
- Armament: 1 × Bofors 57 mm gun or 1 × OTO Melara 76 mm gun; 1 × Bofors 40 mm/70 gun; 4 × Exocet SSM (2x2) or 4 × Harpoon SSM (2x2); Minelaying capability

The La Combattante II type missile boats are two classes of fast attack craft of the Hellenic Navy. The first group of four were ordered by Greece in September 1972 from France. The vessels had no class name but are referred to by type. A second group of six were purchased in the 1990s from Germany, comprising six Type 148 Tiger-class fast attack craft that were being decommissioned. The class was renamed La Combattante IIa, as with the French-made ships. All the ships were under mid-life updates in 1980s. Two vessels in the class, P-74 and P-75, were fitted with RGM-84 Harpoon anti-ship missiles and a new ESM was fitted after transfer.

== Ship list ==
=== La Combattante II ===
Built by Constructions Mécaniques de Normandie of Cherbourg to the standard La Combattante II design, though having a smaller gun armament (4x35mm Oerlikon cannon instead of a single 76mm gun) forward.

Pennant number	Name	Builder	Launched	Re-named	Status
P56	Navsithoi	CMN	1972	renamed Anninos (P14)	stricken 2002
P55	Evniki	CMN	1972	renamed Arliotis (P15)	stricken 2002
P54	Kalypso	CMN	1972	renamed Batsis (P17)	stricken 2004; sold to the Georgian Navy and renamed Dioskuria. Severely damaged in the 2008 South Ossetia war and afterwards scuttled by the Russians.
P53	Kymothoi	CMN	1972	renamed Konidis (P16)	stricken 2003

=== La Combattante IIa ===
(ex- German Type 148 Tiger-class fast attack craft)

Pennant number	Name	Former name	Commissioned by Germany	Commissioned by Greece	Status
P 72	Ypoploiarchos Votsis	ex-Iltis	8 January 1973	28 April 1995	Decommissioned in 2025
P 73	Antiploiarchos Pezopoulos	ex-Storch	17 July 1974	1 February 1994	Decommissioned in 2025
P 74	Plotarchis Vlachavas	ex-Marder	14 June 1973	16 February 1995	Decommissioned in 2011
P 75	Plotarchis Maridakis	ex-Häher	12 June 1974	28 April 1994	Decommissioned in 2025
P 76	Ypoploiarchos Tournas	ex-Leopard	21 August 1973	28 September 2000	Decommissioned in 2011
P 77	Plotarchis Sakipis	ex-Jaguar	21 August 1973	28 September 2000	Decommissioned in 2011

== See also ==
- La Combattante-class fast attack craft
- Greek La Combattante III-class fast attack craft
