= French ship La Combattante =

Three ships of the French Navy have borne the name of La Combattante ("the Fighter", or "Fighting one"):

- A galley which took part in the raid against Teignmouth in August 1690 and destroyed numerous English ships there
- The FNFL destroyer La Combattante, a type III Hunt-class destroyer leased by the UK.
- The patrol boat La Combattante (P730), decommissioned in September 1996.
