= Combattante FS56 =

Class overview
- Builders: Constructions Mécaniques de Normandie
- Planned: 3

General characteristics
- Type: Fast attack long range craft
- Length: 56 m (184 ft)
- Beam: 8.2 m (27 ft)
- Draught: 2.7 m (8 ft 10 in)
- Speed: 38 kn (70 km/h; 44 mph)
- Range: 2,500 nmi (4,600 km; 2,900 mi)
- Complement: 32

Combattante FS56 Stealth Fast Attack Craft is a patrol boat developed by the French Constructions Mécaniques de Normandie shipyard (CMN) as a development of the La Combattante III type fast attack craft.

Three boats have been ordered for the Lebanese Navy, being paid for by Saudi Arabia. The vessels are to be armed with the Simbad air-defence systems and 20 mm Narwhal guns.

In January 2018, it was reported that Saudi Arabia could claim the vessels for its own navy after relations with Lebanon cooled the year before.

== See also ==
- La Combattante-class fast attack craft
