= Franco-Greek defence agreement =

2021 international agreement

France and Greece France Greece

The Franco-Greek defence agreement refers to the defence agreement signed between France and Greece on 27 September 2021, which includes a mutual defence clause (article 2) should either be attacked by a third country. The agreement was accompanied by a defence procurement deal worth €3 billion where France would supply Greece with frigates and corvettes. It was signed by French President Emmanuel Macron, Greek Prime Minister Kyriakos Mitsotakis, French Defence Minister Florence Parly, French Foreign Minister Jean-Yves Le Drian, and Greek Foreign Minister Nikos Dendias. It was ratified by the Greek Parliament on 7 October 2021 by a vote of 191 for to 109 against.

The agreement came two weeks after the surprise announcement of the AUKUS security pact by Australia, United Kingdom and the United States where Australia also cancelled a €35 billion deal for 12 French diesel-electric submarines. After AUKUS was announced and the French deal cancelled, Macron sought to build a more autonomous defensive posture for Europe less reliant on US protection. Macron stated that this defensive agreement was "to take responsibility of the European pillar within NATO and draw the conclusions that we are asked to take of our own protection." The Greek Prime Minister Mitsotakis echoed Macron's statement, saying, "This opens the door to the Europe of tomorrow that is strong and autonomous, capable of defending its interests."

For the first time it is clearly stipulated that there be military assistance in the event of a third party attacking one of the two states.

— Greek Prime Minister Kyriakos Mitsotakis,

In March 2026, French President Emmanuel Macron announced that Greece would be one of the 7 European countries included under its nuclear protection umbrella, with a possibility of stationing French nuclear weapons there in future. During Emmanuel Macron’s visit to Athens, France and Greece renewed their Strategic Partnership Agreement in the field of defence and security. The agreement was extended for another five years. A key element remains the clause on mutual assistance in the event of a threat to either party’s sovereignty.

== Mutual defence clause ==
Article 2 of the agreement stipulates: "The Parties shall provide each other with assistance, with all appropriate means at their disposal, if necessary by the use of armed force, if they jointly find that an armed aggression is taking place against the territory of one of the two, in accordance with Article 51 of the Charter of the United Nations".

In October 2021, the French Ministry of Defence later issued a statement saying the agreement does not cover Exclusive Economic Zones (EEZs). They cited that, per the UN Convention on the Law of the Sea (of which both Greece and France are signatories), the EEZ is not part of the territory of a State.

Atlantic Council, an American think tank in the field of international affairs, noted that "Article Two of their treaty looks much like NATO's Article Five".

== Defence procurement ==
In addition to the alliance, Greece also announced the purchase of three frigates and three corvettes with an option to purchase a fourth of each at a later date. Delivery of them is slated to begin in 2024.

== Reactions ==
Turkey was angered by its announcement and released a statement on 1 October saying "Greece's "maximalist maritime jurisdiction area and national airspace claims" were in contravention of international law and that it would strengthen Turkey's determination to protect its rights in the region."

The United States embraced the agreement between Athens and Paris with a Department of State spokesperson saying "[the US] strongly supports Greece's role in creating stability in the region." Just weeks later, on 14 October, the United States and Greece expanded and indefinitely extended their existing bilateral defensive agreement.

== See also ==
- France–Greece relations
- Foreign relations of France
- Foreign relations of Greece
