= Tiger-class fast attack craft =

Missile boats in the German Navy

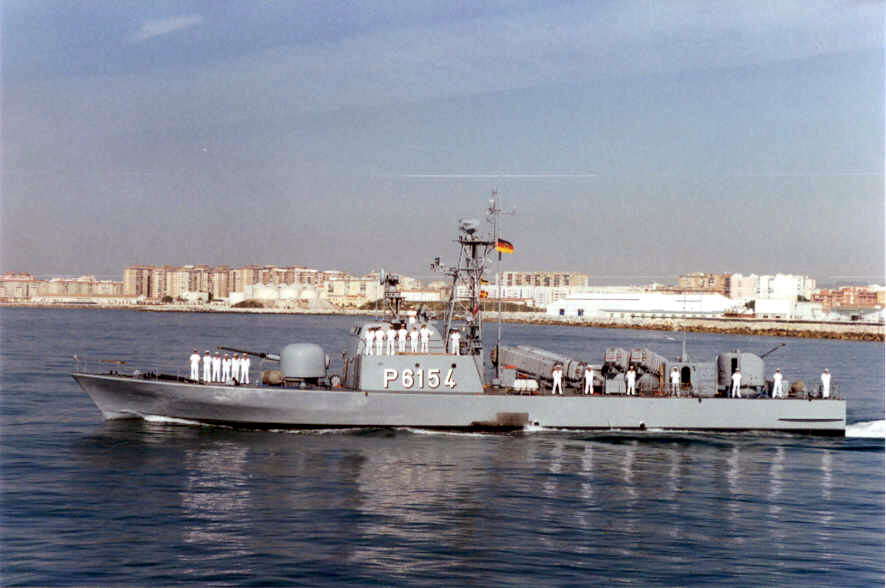
- Tiger-class vessel S54 Elster

Class overview
- Name: Tiger class
- Operators: German Navy; Hellenic Navy; Chilean Navy; Egyptian Navy; Border Police of Georgia
- Preceded by: Zobel class
- Succeeded by: Albatros class
- Built: 1971–1975
- In commission: 1972–2002 (Germany)
- Completed: 20
- Lost: 1

General characteristics (After last refit)
- Type: Fast Attack Craft
- Displacement: 265 tonnes (261 long tons)
- Length: 47 m (154 ft 2 in)
- Beam: 7 m (23 ft)
- Draught: 2.70 m (8 ft 10 in)
- Propulsion: 4 MTU MD 16V 538 TB90 turbo diesel engines, 8,800 kW (11,800 hp) total; 4 propeller shafts
- Speed: 36 knots (67 km/h; 41 mph)
- Range: 570 nmi (1,060 km) at 36 knots (67 km/h; 41 mph); 1,600 nmi (3,000 km) at 15 knots (28 km/h; 17 mph)
- Complement: 30
- Sensors & processing systems: SMA 3RM 20 navigation radar; Triton G surveillance radar; CASTOR II fire-control radar; Link 11 communications
- Electronic warfare & decoys: Decoy and flare launcher; Electronic countermeasures suite
- Armament: 1 × OTO Melara 76mm gun; 1 × Bofors L/70 40mm gun; 4 × MM38 Exocet launchers; 8 × naval mines; The Bofors gun can be replaced with mine laying rails
- Notes: The ships have been updated twice (1982–84 and 1990–92), this represents the last update that was performed on all ships.

The Type 148 Tiger-class fast attack craft are a group of missile boats built to a Franco-German design and seeing service in the German Navy. The vessels entered service in the 1970s and served into the early 21st century. While they have been mostly retired from German Navy service, many were transferred to other navies and remained in service longer.

== Design ==
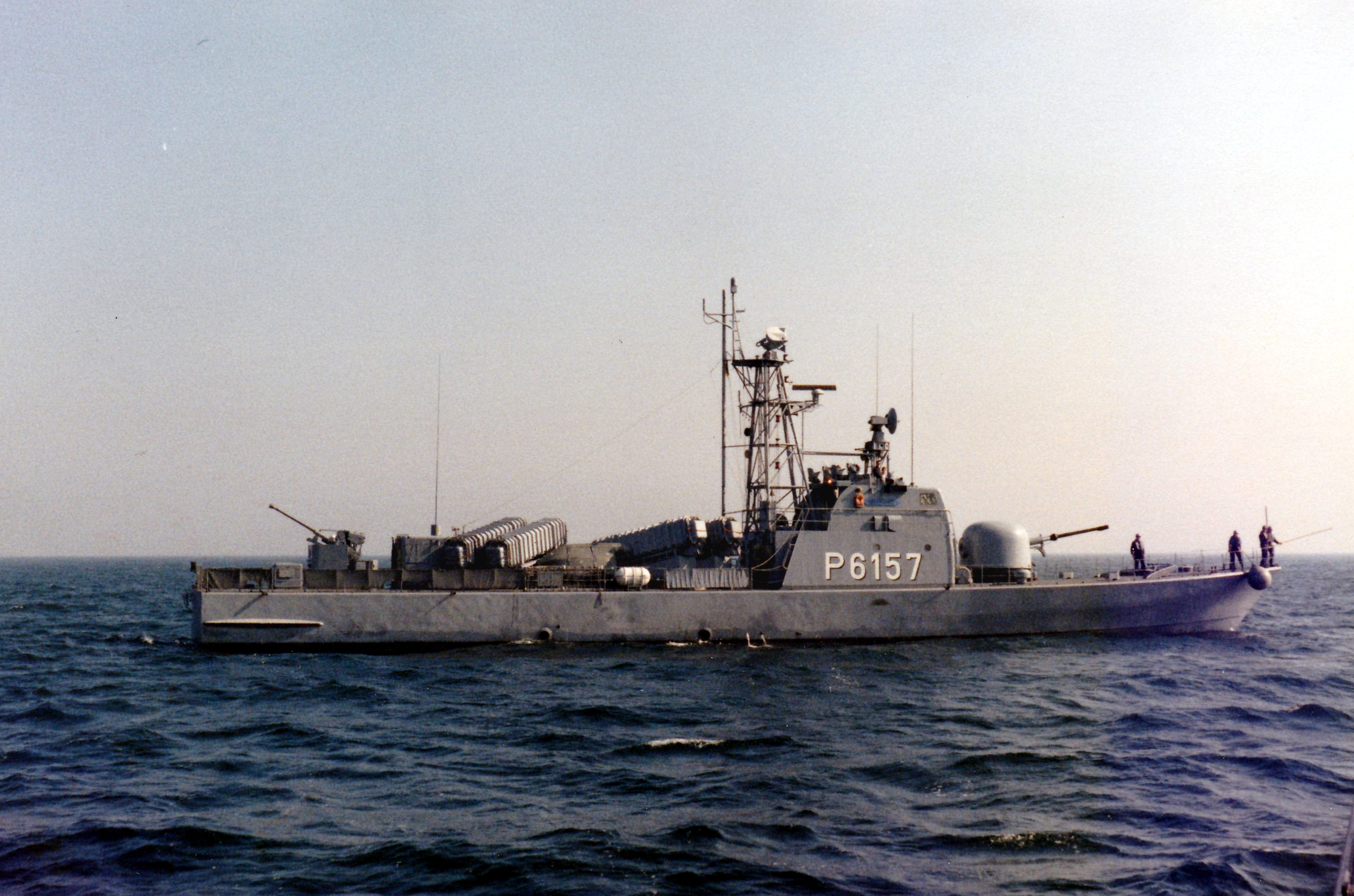
Tiger-class S57 Weihe (P6157), 1985

The vessels had been designed by Lürssen of Germany for Israel. They were a modification of the Jaguar-class fast attack craft, but armed with the French Exocet missile. They were built mainly in France by Constructions Mécaniques de Normandie in Cherbourg (CMN) for political reasons; twelve were built and completed there, while another eight of the boats were laid down by CMH, but completed by Lürssen. Their export to Israel was also blocked for political reasons, and the boats were commissioned into the German Navy as the Tiger class. A number of other boats were built by CMN for various navies to the same design, which became known as the La Combattante II type fast attack craft.

== Operational history ==
The boats were commissioned into the Bundesmarine in the mid-1970s, replacing the Jaguar-class vessels of the 3rd and 5th Squadrons. At first the boats did not receive names, only numbers, but these were introduced later at the insistence of the crews.

The ships served for 30 years, and received major updates in 1982–84 and 1990–92. After decommissioning, they were scrapped or sold to different countries. No direct replacements were procured as due to the changed operating conditions the Deutsche Marine has reduced the number of these fast attack boats drastically and procured instead a smaller number of corvettes.

== Ship list ==
NATO pennant number	German pennant number	Name	Call sign	Shipyard	Laid down	Launched	Commissioned	Decommissioned	Status
P6141	S41	Tiger	DRBA	CMN	11 October 1971	27 September 1972	30 October 1972	24 September 1998	sold to the Chilean Navy as Teniente Uribe (LM-39); decommissioned 2014.
P6142	S42	Iltis (Polecat)	DRBB	CMN	2 February 1972	12 December 1972	8 January 1973	15 October 1992	Transferred to the Hellenic Navy September 1993, commissioned 17 February 1994 as Ypoploiarchos Votsis (Pennant number P51, then P72)
P6143	S43	Luchs (Lynx)	DRBC	CMN	23 March 1972	7 March 1973	9 April 1973	27 August 1998	sold to the Chilean Navy for scrapping
P6144	S44	Marder (Marten)	DRBD	CMN	15 April 1972	5 May 1973	14 July 1973	25 May 1994	Transferred to the Hellenic Navy 16 March 1995, commissioned 30 June 1995 as Plotarchis Vlahavas (Pennant number P74)
P6145	S45	Leopard	DRBE	CMN	13 September 1972	3 July 1973	21 August 1973	28 September 2000	Transferred to the Hellenic Navy and commissioned 27 October 2000 as Ypoploiarchos Tounas (Pennant number P76)
P6146	S46	Fuchs (Fox)	DRBF	Lürssen	10 March 1972	21 May 197	17 October 1973	19 December 2002	Sold to the Egyptian Navy
P6147	S47	Jaguar	DRBG	CMN	29 November 1972	20 September 1973	13 November 1973	28 September 2000	Transferred to the Hellenic Navy and commissioned 27 October 2000 as Plotarchis Sakipis (Pennant number P77)
P6148	S48	Löwe (Lion)	DRBH	Lürssen	10 July 1972	10 September 1973	9 January 1974	19 December 2002	sold to the Egyptian Navy
P6149	S49	Wolf	DRBI	CMN	23 January 1973	11 January 1974	26 February 1974	27 August 1997	sold to the Chilean Navy in 1997 as Guardiamarina Riquelme (LM-36); decommissioned 2004.
P6150	S50	Panther	DRBJ	Lürssen	30 September 1972	10 December 1973	27 March 1974	29 September 2002	scrapped 2003
P6151	S51	Häher (Jay)	DRBK	CMN	5 April 1973	26 April 1974	12 June 1974	23 June 1994	Transferred to the Hellenic Navy 16 March 1995, commissioned 30 June 1995 as Plotarchis Maridakis (Pennant number P75)
P6152	S52	Storch (Stork)	DRBL	Lürssen	12 March 1973	25 March 1974	17 July 1974	12 November 1992	Transferred to the Hellenic Navy September 1993, commissioned 17 February 1994 as Antiploiarchos Pezopoulos (Pennant number P30, then P73)
P6153	S53	Pelikan (Pelican)	DRBM	CMN	11 September 1973	4 July 1974	24 September 1974	25 June 1998	sold to the Chilean Navy for scrapping.
P6154	S54	Elster (Magpie)	DRBN	Lürssen	29 June 1973	8 July 1974	14 November 1974	27 August 1997	sold to the Chilean Navy in 1997 as Teniente Orella (LM-37); decommissioned 2014.
P6155	S55	Alk (Auk)	DRBO	CMN	9 April 1974	15 November 1974	7 January 1975	13 May 2002	sold to the Egyptian Navy
P6156	S56	Dommel (Bittern)	DRBP	Lürssen	13 December 1973	30 October 1974	12 February 1975	19 December 2002	sold to the Egyptian Navy
P6157	S57	Weihe (Harrier)	DRBQ	CMN	2 July 1974	13 February 1975	3 April 1975	19 December 2002	sold to the Egyptian Navy
P6158	S58	Pinguin (Penguin)	DRBR	Lürssen	11 March 1974	26 February 1975	22 May 1975	28 June 2002	scrapped 2003
P6159	S59	Reiher (Heron)	DRBS	CMN	8 November 1974	15 May 1975	24 June 1975	27 September 2002	scrapped 2003
P6160	S60	Kranich (Crane)	DRBT	Lürssen	9 May 1974	26 May 1975	6 August 1975	24 September 1998	sold to the Chilean Navy in 1998 as Teniente Serrano (LM-38); decommissioned 2014.

== See also ==
- La Combattante class fast attack craft
