= La Combattante-class fast attack craft =

Type of French-built warship

The La Combattante patrol boat was a type of fast attack craft built in France for export during the 1970s and '80s. It went through several modifications and was sold to, and operated by, numerous navies around the world.

== Development ==
The La Combattante was a German-French joint venture, proposed by the German government to combine a Lürssen-designed fast patrol boat with Aerospatiale's Exocet missile. However the French government insisted on a French design from Constructions Mécaniques de Normandie (CMN) in Cherbourg and for half the boats in the order to be built in France. The name was derived from the vessel used for trials of the Exocet, the patrol craft La Combattante (P730).

== La Combattante II ==
The first group of boats were the 20 built for the German Bundesmarine, commissioned in 1968 as the Tiger class. A number of these were later sold on to the navies of Greece, Chile and Egypt.

Following this, between 1968 and 1974 CMN built a further 37 vessels, known as La Combattante II, for the navies of Iran (12 Kaman class), Malaysia (four Perdana class) and Libya (nine Beir Grassa class). In the same period CMN built 12 fast attack craft to a similar design for Israel (the Sa'ar 1-3 classes) which are included by some sources in the type.

These vessels were typically of 234 tons displacement and 47 metres in length, and a typical armament of 1x76mm gun forward, 4x Exocet missiles in box launchers amidships, and a 40mm gun aft, though actual outfits varied according to the operators requirements.

== La Combattante III ==
In 1975 CMN modified the design, adding 9 metres to the length to improve seaworthiness and give more internal space; this gave a displacement of 359 tons and an overall length of 56 metres, though the armament remained the same. This design was designated La Combattante III.

Between 1975 and 1990 a further 19 were built for the navies of Greece, Tunisia, Qatar, and Nigeria. In addition were built for Israel (the Sa'ar 4 class), five in France and the remainder under licence in Israel. The Israelis also built, or assisted in building, nine vessels for South Africa, at the time under embargo for its Apartheid policy.

== Further developments ==
Apart from the Israelis, Greece and Iran also built vessels developed from the La Combattante designs; these were the six Greek vessels (simply known as La Combattante IIIb) and nine Iranian Sina class.

CMN have also continued to modernize the equipment and armaments of these designs, with the Combattante FS46 and FS56 models.
