= La Combattante III-class fast attack craft =

Missile boats

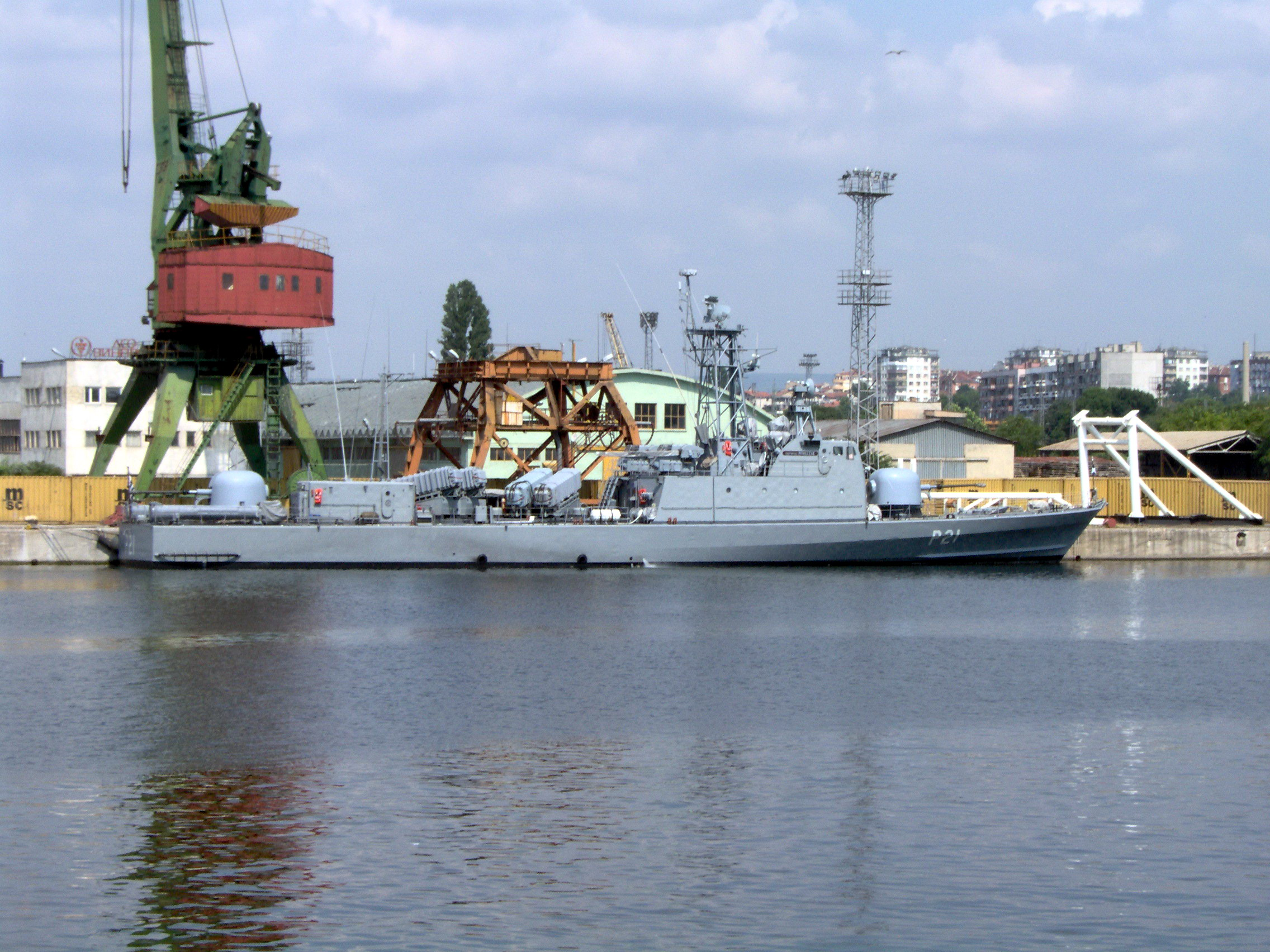
- HS Blessas (P-21) in 2011, before the mid-life modernization

Class overview
- Builders: CMN Lurssen
- Operators: Hellenic Navy
- Preceded by: La Combattante IIa class
- Succeeded by: Roussen class
- In commission: 3 May 1975
- Planned: 10
- Completed: 10
- Active: 9

General characteristics
- Type: Missile boat
- Displacement: 359–425 t (353–418 long tons)
- Length: 56.2 metres (184 ft)
- Beam: 7.9 metres (26 ft)
- Draft: 2.5 metres (8.2 ft)
- Installed power: 18,000 bhp (12.54 MW) sustained
- Propulsion: 4 x MTU 20V 538 TB92 diesels; 4 x shafts (P 20-23)
- Speed: 36.5 knots (67.6 km/h; 42.0 mph)
- Range: 300 nmi (30 knots); 2,000 nmi (15 knots)
- Crew: 42 (5 officers)
- Sensors & processing systems: 2 x CSEE Panda optical directors for 30 mm guns; Thomson-CSF Vega I or II system (P 20-P 23); Radar: Search: Thomson-CSF Triton G-band (range 33 km for 2 m^{2} target); Navigation: Decca 1226C (I-band); Fire-control: Thomson-CSF Castor II (I/J-band, range 31 km for 2 m^{2} target
- Electronic warfare & decoys: Decoys: Wegmann chaff launchers; Thomson-CSF DR 2000S intercept
- Armament: SSMs: 4 x Harpoon anti-ship missiles; Guns: 2 x Otobreda 76 mm (85 rounds/min, 16 km anti-surface, 12 km (6.5 nmi) anti-aircraft); Torpedoes: 4 x Emerson Electric 30 mm (2 twin, 1,200 rounds/min)
- Armor: 2.5 in (64 mm) Kevlar over vital spaces

The La Combattante III type missile boats are two classes of fast attack craft built for the Hellenic Navy. The first group of four were ordered by Greece in September 1974 from France. The vessels had no class name but are referred to by type. They are similar to the La Combattante IIa-class fast attack craft already in service, but are larger and armed with torpedoes. A second group of six were ordered in 1978, to be built under license in Greece and use the Norwegian Penguin Mk 2 Mod 3 missiles. Since 2019, all the ships of the class use Harpoon anti-ship missiles.

== Ships ==
=== La Combattante IIIa ===
The La Combattante IIIa type missile boats of the Hellenic Navy are a class of four fast attack craft built in France to the La Combattante III design. The vessels had no class name but are referred to by type. The ships of this class have been named after officers of the Hellenic Navy killed during World War II. They are:

Pennant number	Greek name	Transliterated name	Namesake	Builder	Launched	Commissioned	Status
P 20 (original P 50)	Αντιπλοίαρχος Λάσκος	Antiploiarchos Laskos	Commander Vasileios Laskos, captain of the submarine Katsonis, killed when the ship was sunk by the Germans on 14 September 1943	Constructions mécaniques de Normandie		20 April 1977	Active
P 21 (original P 51)	Πλωτάρχης Μπλέσσας	Plotarchis Blessas	Lieutenant Commander Georgios Blessas, captain of the destroyer Vasilissa Olga, killed when the ship was sunk by the Germans on 26 September 1943	Constructions mécaniques de Normandie		7 July 1977	Active
P 22 (original P 57)	Υποπλοίαρχος Μυκόνιος	Ypoploiarchos Mykonios	Lieutenant Sofoklis Mykonios, 2nd officer of the submarine Katsonis, killed when the ship was sunk by the Germans on 14 September 1943	Constructions mécaniques de Normandie		10 February 1978	Active
P 23 (original P 52)	Υποπλοίαρχος Τρουπάκης	Ypoploiarchos Troupakis	Lieutenant Stefanos Troupakis, 3rd officer of the submarine Katsonis, killed when the ship was sunk by the Germans on 14 September 1943	Constructions mécaniques de Normandie		8 November 1977	Active

=== La Combattante IIIb ===
The La Combattante IIIb type missile boats of the Hellenic Navy are a class of six fast attack craft built in Greece to a French design. The vessels had no class name but are referred to by type. They are a similar but newer design than the Greek La Combattante IIIa-class fast attack craft, with the main difference that they use Kongsberg Penguin Mk 2 Mod 3 missiles. The six ships were built at Hellenic Shipyards (first launching in 1979). Kostakos (P 25) sank after collision with a ferry in November 1996.

The ships of this class have been named after junior officers of the Hellenic Navy killed during World War II. They are:

Pennant number	Greek name	Transliterated name	Namesake	Builder	Launched	Commissioned	Status
P 24	Σημαιοφόρος Καβαλούδης	Simaioforos Kavaloudis	Torpedo Ensign Minas Kavaloudis, crew member of the submarine Katsonis, killed when the ship was sunk by the Germans on 14 September 1943	Hellenic Shipyards		14 July 1980	Decommissioned September 2024
P 25	Υποπλοίαρχος Κωστάκος	Ypoploiarchos Kostakos	Lieutenant Ioannis Kostakos, crew member of the submarine Glafkos, killed in a Luftwaffe attack in Malta on 27 February 1942	Hellenic Shipyards		9 September 1980	Lost in collision with the passenger ship Samaina, 6 November 1996
P 26	Υποπλοίαρχος Ντεγιάννης	Ypoploiarchos Degiannis	Lieutenant Ilias Degiannis, Resistance leader during World War II, executed by the Germans on 18 June 1943	Hellenic Shipyards		11 December 1980	Active
P 27	Σημαιοφόρος Ξένος	Simaioforos Xenos	Machinist Ensign Konstantinos Xenos, crew member of the submarine Katsonis, killed when the ship was sunk by the Germans on 14 September 1943	Hellenic Shipyards		31 March 1981	Decommissioned 28 March 2025
P 28	Σημαιοφόρος Σιμιτζόπουλος	Simaioforos Simitzopoulos	Ensign Nikolaos Simitzopoulos, crew member of the destroyer Vasilissa Olga, killed when the ship was sunk by the Germans on 26 September 1943	Hellenic Shipyards		30 June 1981	Active
P 29	Σημαιοφόρος Σταράκης	Simaioforos Starakis	Machinist Ensign Vasileios Starakis, crew member of the submarine Triton, killed when the ship was sunk by the Germans on 16 November 1942	Hellenic Shipyards		12 October 1981	Active

== Mid-life modernization ==
In 2003, the Hellenic Navy decided to modernize the Fast Attack Craft Missile Class La Combattante III and La Combattante IIIb. For the four Combattante III fast attack craft, Thales Nederland delivered the TACTICOS combat management system, which includes four multifunctional operator consoles, one surveillance radar, one fire control tracking system, one electro-optical tracking and fire control system, an integrated low probability of interception radar, two target designation sights, and a tactical data link. The weapon suite of the Combattantes III remained unchanged. Thales was responsible for the integration of these existing guns, surface-to-surface missiles, and torpedo system. The modernization project was completed in 2010.

After the completion of the modernization program, Hellenic Navy substituted all the existing anti-ship missiles (Penguin Mk2 Mod 3 & Exocet) with Harpoon missiles (coming from stock from previously decommissioned ships).

== Gallery ==
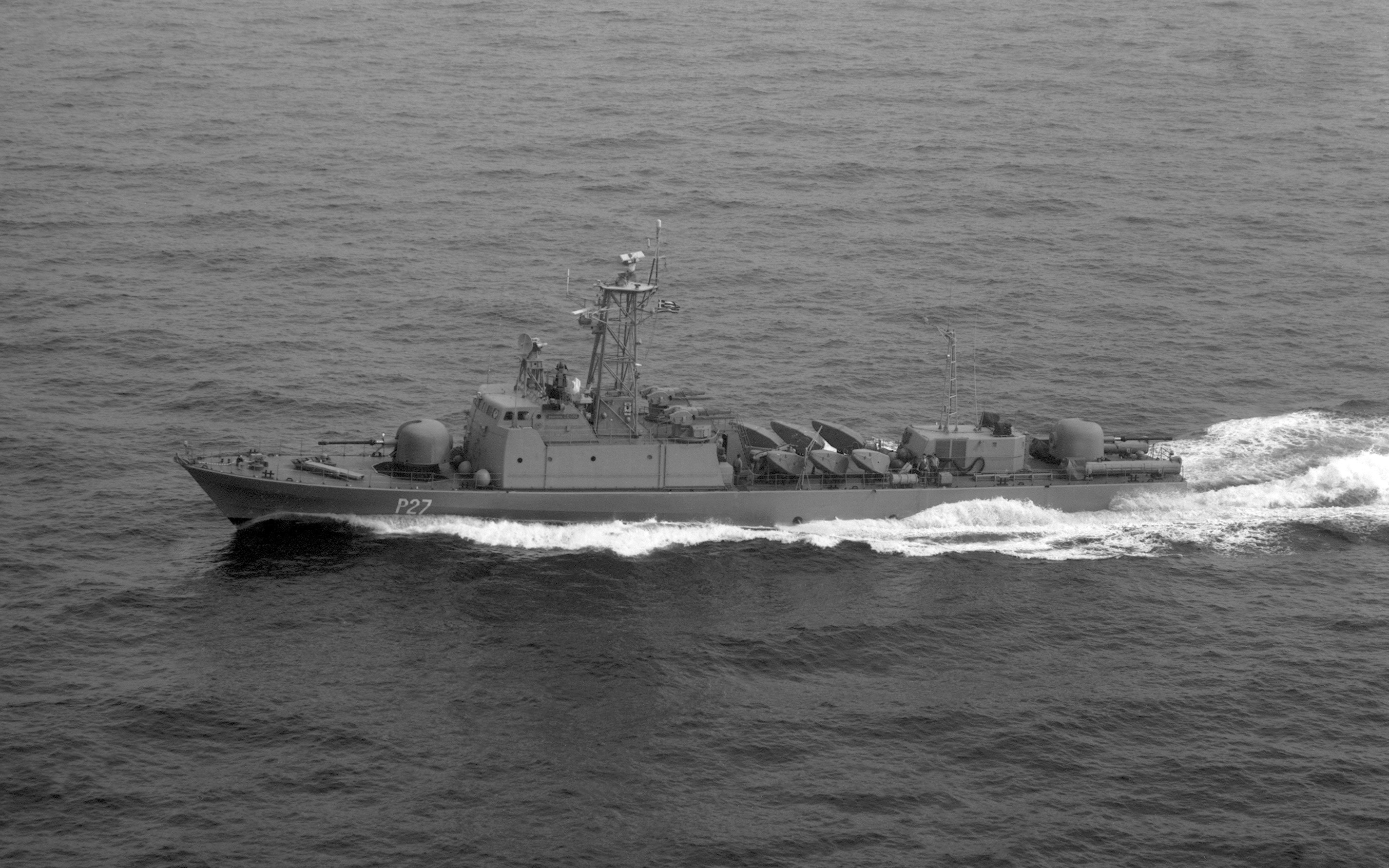
Aerial photo of Simaioforos Xenos (HS P-27) La Combattante IIIb class FAC, in 1988

== See also ==
- La Combattante-class fast attack craft
- Greek La Combattante IIa-class fast attack craft

== Bibliography ==
- Gardiner, Robert; Chumbley, Stephen Conway's All The World's Fighting Ships 1947–1995 (1995) Naval Institute Press, Annapolis ISBN 1-55750-132-7
