= French patrol vessel La Combattante =

History

France
- Name: La Combattante
- Operator: French Navy
- Builder: CMN, Cherbourg
- Laid down: 5 December 1961
- Launched: 20 June 1963
- Commissioned: 1 March 1964
- Identification: Pennant number P730
- Fate: Stricken 1994

General characteristics (After last refit)
- Type: Patrol Craft
- Displacement: 180 tonnes (180 long tons)
- Length: 45 m (147 ft 8 in)
- Beam: 7.4 m (24 ft)
- Draught: 2.50 m (8 ft 2 in)
- Propulsion: 2 SEMT-Pielstick VG DS diesel engines, 3600 bhp; 2 propeller shafts
- Speed: 23 knots (43 km/h; 26 mph)
- Range: 2,000 nmi (3,700 km) at 12 knots (22 km/h; 14 mph)
- Complement: 27
- Electronic warfare & decoys: Decoy and flare launcher
- Armament: 1 × Bofors 40mm gun; 4 × SS.11 launchers; 2 × 12.7mm MG

La Combattante (P730) ("The Fighter") was a fast patrol vessel of the French Navy. She was built in 1963 and was to be the prototype for a class of coastal patrol craft. La Combattante was operational in the French Navy from 1963 until 1985, when she was transferred to the French Coast Guard. She was discarded in 1994.

== Design and construction ==
La Combattante was ordered from Constructions Mécaniques de Normandie (CMN), Cherbourg, on 5 December 1961. She was launched on 20 June 1963 and was completed in March 1964. La Combattante was built of laminated wood and plastic, in order to have a small magnetic signature. She had an armament of one 40mm and two 12.7mm machine-guns, and a speed of 23 knots.

Her design inspired a series of similar vessels, including that of the Circé class coastal minehunters built by CMN in the 1990s, and the "La Combattante" type missile boats built by CMN for export.

== Service history ==
La Combattante was commissioned on 1 March 1964, and saw service in France and overseas, in the French Indian Ocean and Pacific Ocean territories. In the late 60's La Combattante was used as the launch vehicle for trials of the Aérospatiale's Exocet missile. Following the success of these, and the adoption of the Exocet by the French Navy, La Combattante was equipped with four SS11 launchers. In January 1985 La Combattante was transferred to the Maritime Gendarmerie, the French coastguard service; her missile launchers were removed, though she kept her gun armament. In 1994 La Combattante was stricken.
