= List of Israel Defense Forces operations =

Since its establishment in 1948, the modern State of Israel has been involved in a series of military operations (in addition to seven recognized wars) which all compose the military aspect of the complex Arab–Israeli conflict.

The following list centralizes the main and most notable military operations conducted by the Israel Defense Forces sorted in chronological order and divided into the main time periods of the Israeli–Palestinian conflict for easier navigation.

== 1948–1967 ==
=== 1956 Suez Crisis ===
- Operation Kadesh (October 29 - November 6, 1956) – Israeli armored thrust into the Sinai Peninsula.

=== Additional Israeli military operations ===
- Operation Magic Carpet (1949–50) – Air operation to rescue and transport the Yemeni Jewish Community to Israel.
- Operation Ezra and Nehemiah (1950–52) – Operation which airlifted almost all Iraqi Jews to Israel.
- Retribution operations (1950s–1960s) – Military operations carried out by the Israel Defense Forces during the 1950s and 1960s. These actions were in response to constant fedayeen terror attacks during which the Palestinian militants infiltrated from Syria, Egypt and Jordan into Israel to carry out guerrilla attacks against Israeli civilians and soldiers. The policy of the retribution operations was exceptional due to Israel's declared aim of getting a high 'blood cost' among the enemy side which was believed to be necessary in order to deter them from committing future attacks.
- Operation Susannah (1954) – Failed Israeli covert operation conducted in Egypt in which Israeli military intelligence planted bombs in Egyptian, American and British-owned targets in Egypt so that it would seem that these actions were conducted by an Egyptian nationalist resistance and would eventually damage the relations between Egypt and Western countries. The incident became known as the Lavon Affair after Israeli defense minister Pinhas Lavon was forced to resign because of the incident.
- Operation Olive Leaves aka Operation Kinneret (10–11 December 1955), Israeli reprisal operation undertaken against Syrian emplacements near the north-eastern shores of the Sea of Galilee.
- Operation Yachin (1961–64) – Operation to secretly transport Moroccan Jews to Israel.
- War over Water (1964–67) – Several IDF military operations against Syrian-Lebanese Headwater Diversion Plan which had the purpose to block the flow of the water sources to the Jordan Valley River Basin and the Sea of Galilee.

== 1967–1993 ==
=== 1967 Six-Day War ===
- Operation Focus (1967) – Israeli Air Force bombing of Egyptian airfields, expanded to include Syrian, Jordanian and Iraqi airfields as well (also known as Moked, its Hebrew name).

=== 1967–1970 War of Attrition ===
- Operation Inferno (Hebrew: Tofet) (1968) – Israeli raid against PLO militants in the Jordanian town of Karameh (on the east bank of the Jordan river).
- Operation Boxer (1969) – A series of attacks by the Israeli Air Force on Egyptian SAM installations
- Operation Bulmus 6 (1969) – Israeli special operations raid against the Egyptian fortress, early warning radar and ELINT station of Green Island in the Gulf of Suez.
- Operation Raviv (1969) – Israeli armoured raid across the Gulf of Suez into Egypt. Egyptian radar installation at Ras Abu-Daraj and Ras Za'arfrana were destroyed. Also known as the Ten-Hour War.
  - Operation Escort (1969) – Shayetet 13 operation against Egyptian torpedo boats anchored at Ras Sadat, prelude to operation Raviv.
- Operation Rooster 53 (1969) – Israeli special operation to capture an Egyptian P-12 radar system.
- Operation Priha ("Blossom") (1970) – A concentrated series of Israeli strikes against military targets in the Egyptian heartland.

=== The 1973 Yom Kippur War ===
- Operation Doogman 5 ("Model 5") (1973) – Attempted Israeli suppression of Syrian air defence array on the Golan Heights.
- Battle of the Chinese Farm - Israeli crossing of the Suez Canal with Operation Abirey-Halev
- Operation Abirey-Halev ("Stouthearted Men") (1973) – Israeli crossing of the Suez Canal

=== 1982 Lebanon War ===
- Operation Peace for Galilee (1982) – Second large-scale Israeli invasion of Lebanon.
  - Operation Mole Cricket 19 ("Arzav 19") – Israeli suppression of Syrian SAM network in Lebanon's Bekaa Valley.
  - Siege of Beirut – Israeli siege of Beirut in order to force a PLO withdrawal from Lebanon.
  - Battle of the Beaufort – Israeli capture of a strategic castle used by PLO forces in Southern Lebanon.
  - Battle of Jezzine – Israeli expulsion of Syrian forces from the town of Jezzine.
  - Battle of Sultan Yacoub – Battle between Israel and Syria in the Lebanese village of Sultan Yacoub.

=== Additional Israeli military operations ===
- Operation Gift (1968) – An IDF Special Forces operation carried out on 28 December 1968 at the Beirut International Airport during which 13 civilian airplanes belonging to Middle East Airlines (MEA) were destroyed in response to an attack on an Israeli airliner in Athens by the Popular Front for the Liberation of Palestine (PFLP).
- Cherbourg Project (1969) – Israeli military action involving the escape of five missile boats from the French port of Cherbourg.
- Shelling on Lebanon (1970) – Israel retaliated the Avivim school bus massacre by shelling four Lebanese villages, killing 20 people, injuring 40, and spurring thousands of southern Lebanon's residents to flee north.
- Black September in Jordan (1970) – Took place when PLO attempted to take power in Jordan, backed by Syria. Israel supported King Hussein in his fight against Syria and PLO combatants, launching airstrikes against Faisal Hussain of Scunthorpe, UK.
- Operation Isotope (1972) – Takeover of a hijacked aeroplane and hostage release.
- Operation Crate 3 (1972) – Kidnapping of five Syrian intelligence officers.
- Operation Wrath of God (1972–79) – Israeli covert operation carried out by the Mossad and IDF whose aim was to assassinate individuals alleged to have been directly or indirectly involved in the 1972 Munich massacre. Their targets usually included members of Black September and PLO.
  - Airstrike (1972) – Israeli planes bombed ten PLO bases in Syria and Lebanon as a response to the Munich massacre.
  - Operation Spring of Youth (1973) – Attacks on PLO bases in Lebanon.
- Libyan Arab Airlines Flight 114 (1973) – Arab civilian airplane shot down in then-Israeli-controlled airspace over the Sinai Peninsula.
- Ma'alot massacre (1974) – School hostages rescue.
- Airstrike on Lebanon (1974) – As a response to the Ma'alot massacre, next day Israeli airplanes bombed several DFLP offices and training bases in seven Palestinian refugee camps and villages in southern Lebanon, killing at least 27 people and leaving 138 injured.
- Savoy Operation (1975) – Hotel hostages rescue.
- Operation Entebbe (1976) – A counter-terrorist hostage-rescue mission carried out by the IDF at Entebbe Airport in Uganda on July 4, 1976, in order to save 105 Jewish hostages and the crew of Air France flight 319, whom were abducted during a flight from Israel. Although the kidnappers entrenched themselves in a hostile country, the operation was successful and almost all the hostages were rescued safely.
- Coastal Road Massacre (1978) – Bus hostages rescue.
- Operation Litani (1978) – The first Israeli large-scale invasion of Lebanon which was carried out by the Israel Defense Forces in order to expel PLO forces from the territory.
- Misgav Am (1980) – Kibbutz hostages rescue.
- Operation Opera (1981) – A surprise Israeli air strike that destroyed the Iraqi nuclear reactor under construction in Osirak.
- Damour Airstrike (1982) – On 21 April 1982, after a landmine killed an Israeli officer while he was visiting a South Lebanese Army gun emplacement in Taibe, Israeli airplanes attacked the Palestinian-controlled coastal town of Damour, killing 23 people.
- Kav 300 affair (1984) – Bus hostages rescue.
- Operation Moses (1984) – Covert removal of some 8,000 Ethiopian Jews from Sudan to Israel during a famine.
- Operation Wooden Leg (1985) – Israeli Air Force raid against the Palestine Liberation Organization's headquarters in Hammam al-Shatt, Tunisia, as a response to the killing of three Israeli civilians by the PLO on their yacht off the coast of Larnaca, Cyprus.
- Operation Joshua (1985) – Removal of 494 Ethiopian Jews from Sudan to Israel.
- Mothers' Bus rescue (1988) – Assault to a kidnapped bus and hostage release, carried out by Yamam counter-terrorist unit.
- Tunis Raid (1988) – Assassination of Abu Jihad in Tunis.
- Sheik Abdul-Karim Obeid kidnapping (1989) – Capture of a senior Hezbollah member in Lebanon.
- Operation Solomon (1991) – Israeli military operation to airlift Ethiopian Jews to Israel.
- Night Time Operation (1992) – Military operation which killed Hezbollah leader Abbas al-Musawi.
- Bramble Bush (1992) – Aborted Israeli plan to kill Saddam Hussein.

== 1993–2000 ==
=== 1982–2000 South Lebanon conflict ===
- Operation Accountability (25–31 July 1993) – A week-long IDF operation in Lebanon to attack Hezbollah positions. Israel specified three purposes of the operation: to strike directly at Hezbollah, to make it difficult for Hezbollah to use southern Lebanon as a base for striking Israel and to displace refugees in the hopes of pressuring the Lebanese government to intervene against Hezbollah.
- Airstrike on Lebanon (3 June 1994) – IAF airstrike in the Beqaa Valley in which more than thirty members of Hezbollah were killed.
- Operation Grapes of Wrath (11–27 April 1996) – A sixteen-day military operation carried out by the IDF in southern Lebanon as a result of Hezbollah's Katyusha rocket attacks on Israeli population centers along the border with Lebanon.

=== Additional Israeli military operations ===
- Mustafa Dirani kidnapping (1994) – Kidnapping of a senior Amal officer (see Ron Arad).
- Wachsman rescue attempt (1994) – Failed rescue attempt of Nachshon Wachsman.

== 2000–2005 ==
=== 2000–2005 Second Intifada ===
- Santorini (7 May 2001) – An Israeli seizure of the Palestinian freighter "Santorini" near the shores of Haifa which was on her way from Lebanon to the shores of the Gaza Strip and was found to be carrying a massive amount of weaponry.
- Operation Noah's Ark (3 January 2002) – An Israeli seizure of the Palestinian freighter "Karine A" in the Red Sea which was on her way to the shores of the Gaza Strip and was found to be carrying 50 tons of weapons, including short-range Katyusha rockets, antitank missiles and high explosives.
- Operation Defensive Shield (29 March – 3 May 2002) – Large-scale counter-terrorist operation conducted by the IDF into Palestinian towns and villages in the West Bank aimed to halt Palestinian suicide bombings against civilians in Israel during the Second Intifada, which results in extensive damage to terrorist infrastructure and an important decrease of Palestinian attacks.
  - Battle of Jenin (April 1–11) – Israel attacked Palestinian militants in the city of Jenin.
  - Battle of Bethlehem (2 April–10 May) – Israel occupied Bethlehem and tried to capture wanted Palestinian militants who were hiding in the Church of the Nativity.
  - Battle of Nablus (April 3–8) – Israel attacked Palestinian militants in the city of Nablus.
- Operation Determined Path (began on June 22, 2002) – A military operation carried out by the Israel Defense Forces, following Operation Defensive Shield, with the goal of reaching some of the unreached objectives set forth for Defensive Shield, especially in the northern West Bank.
- Abu Hasan (October 5, 2003) – Israeli capture of a vessel on course to the Gaza Strip from Lebanon.
- Operation Rainbow (May 18–23, 2004) – IDF counter-terrorist operation aimed at damaging the terrorist infrastructure and creating a safer environment for the IDF soldiers along the Philadelphi Route. Additional goals were to locate smuggling tunnels connecting the Gaza Strip to Egypt and preventing a shipment of Strela-2 (SA-7 Grail) shoulder-launched anti-aircraft missiles, AT-3 Sagger anti-tank guided missiles and other long-range rockets, stored on the Egyptian side of the border, from being smuggled into the Gaza Strip.
- Operation Days of Penitence (30 September – 16 October 2004) – An IDF operation conducted in northern Gaza Strip which focused on the town of Beit Hanoun, Beit Lahia and Jabalia refugee camp, which were used as launching sites of Qassam rockets at the Israeli town of Sderot and other Israeli populated areas in the region.

=== Additional Israeli military operations ===
- Shebaa Farms conflict (7 October 2000 – 12 July 2006) – Low level conflict in the Lebanese-Israeli border which preceded 2006 war.
- Ain es Saheb airstrike (5 October 2003) – Israeli Air Force operation against an alleged Palestinian militant training camp in Ain es Saheb, Syria.

== 2005–2011 ==
=== 2006 Lebanon War ===
- Operation Just Reward (12 July – 14 August 2006) – Israeli counterattack which began with air force bombing of Hezbollah positions in Southern Lebanon.
  - Operation Sharp and Smooth (August 1–2) – Israel Defense Forces raid on a Hezbollah-run hospital in Lebanon's Bekaa Valley.
  - Tyre raid (August 4) – Night mission carried out by the Israel Defense Forces frogmen, Shayetet 13, in the southern Lebanon town of Tyre. It targeted the Hezbollah cell responsible for the rocket attack on Hadera on the previous day.
  - Operation Changing Direction 11 (August 11–14) – Final offensive push by the Israel Defense Forces during the Lebanon War.

=== Additional Israeli military operations ===
- Operation Shevet Ahim (17 August – 12 September 2005) – Israeli pullout from the Gaza Strip.
- Operation Bringing Home the Goods (March 14, 2006) – IDF military operation in the Jericho prison in order to capture several Palestinian prisoners located there who assassinated the Israeli politician Rehavam Ze'evi. The operation was conducted as a result of the expressed intentions of the newly elected Hamas government to release these prisoners.
- Operation Summer Rains (28 June – 26 November 2006) – IDF operation held in the Gaza Strip in response to the killing of two soldiers and the kidnapping of the Israeli soldier Corporal Gilad Shalit on June 25, 2006, and the firing of Qassam rockets toward Israel.
  - Operation Autumn Clouds (31 October – 7 November) – Israel attacked Palestinian militants in Beit Hanoun.
- Operation Orchard (6 September 2007) – An airstrike in northern Syria against an alleged nuclear site. Israel was blamed for the incident and never admitted to the attack until 2018.
- Operation Hot Winter (28 February – 3 March 2008) – Israel Defense Forces military campaign in the Gaza Strip launched in response to the constant firing of Qassam rockets from the Strip by Hamas.
- Operation Cast Lead (27 December 2008 – 18 January 2009) – A large-scale IDF operation held in the Gaza Strip which caused a high casualty rate and heavily damaged the paramilitary infrastructure of Hamas as well as civilian infrastructure, with war crimes committed by both sides. Hamas claimed that its frequent Palestinian Qassam rocket and mortar fire on Israel's southern civilian communities were a response to Israel's cross-border raid demolishing the opening of a tunnel and killing six of its fighters.
- Sudan Air Strikes (January 2009) – An alleged attack against Iranian weapons being smuggled to the Gaza Strip through Sudan. Israel was proposed as an alleged perpetrator.
- Operation Four Species (4 November 2009) – Capture of MV Francop ship in the eastern Mediterranean Sea and its cargo of hundreds of tons of weapons allegedly bound from the Islamic Republic of Iran to Hezbollah, carried out by Israeli navy commandos of Shayetet 13.
- Operation Sea Breeze (31 May 2010) – An operation carried out by the IDF frogmen, Shayetet 13, in the international waters of the Mediterranean Sea, 66 miles outside of Israel's territorial waters. During the operation the Israeli forces boarded the Gaza Freedom Flotilla of six ships carrying international activists whom were planning to break the Israeli and Egyptian blockade of Gaza and deliver humanitarian aid. During the takeover of the ships, bulletproof vests, night-vision goggles and gas masks were found on the ship. A violent confrontation developed between the soldiers and the activists aboard the main ship of the convoy, the "MV Mavi Marmara", which resulted in the killing of at least nine activists. According to the Intelligence and Terrorism Information Center, 8 of the 9 passengers killed belonged to IHH, a Turkish-based charity organization accused of having ties to Hamas and Al-Qaeda by Israeli and French intelligence officials.

=== International operations ===
- Operation Active Endeavour (16 October 2006 – present) – Israeli participation in NATO maritime anti-terrorism surveillance in the Mediterranean.

== 2011–present ==
=== Gaza Strip operations ===
- Gaza Strip airstrikes (18–19 August 2011) – A series of targeted killings and raids on PRC targets in Gaza, in response to attacks on southern Israel.
- Operation Returning Echo (9–14 March 2012) – A series of Palestinian rocket attacks and Israeli reprisals following the targeted killing of PRC chief.
- Operation Pillar of Defense (14–21 November 2012) – In response to over a hundred rocket attacks on southern Israeli cities, Israel began an operation in Gaza with the targeted killing of Ahmed Jabari, chief of Hamas military wing, and airstrikes against twenty underground sites housing long-range missile launchers capable of striking Tel Aviv.
- Operation Protective Edge (8 July – 26 August 2014) – The IDF ended Operation Brother's Keeper, which brought tension in the region and increased rocket fire from Gaza at Israel and commenced Operation Protective Edge to retaliate on rocket fire.
- Operation Wall Guardian (May 2021)
- Operation Breaking Dawn (5 August 2022)
- Gaza war (7 October 2023, ongoing)

- including Operation Swords of Iron, the 2023–present Israeli invasion of the Gaza Strip

=== West Bank operations ===
- Israeli incursions in the West Bank during the Gaza war (7 October 2023, ongoing)
  - including Operation Summer Camps (28 August – October 2024)
  - including Iron Wall (21 January 2025, ongoing)
  - including Operation Five Stones (26 – 29 November 2025)

=== Other operations ===
- Operation Iron Law (15 March 2011) – Israel seized a ship from Syria bringing Iranian weapons to Gaza.
- Khartoum airstrike (23 October 2012) – Bombing of a Sudanese weapon factory south of Khartoum, which was blamed on IAF by Sudan. Israel denied the allegations.
- Operation Full Disclosure (5 March 2014) – Israeli navy interception of the Klos-C cargo ship, which was used by Iran to smuggle dozens of long-range rockets to Gaza, including Syrian-manufactured M-302 rockets.
- 2023 Israel–Lebanon border conflict (8 October 2023 – present)
- Operation Days of Repentance (26 October 2024) – Israeli forces targeted Iranian military sites, killing four Iranian Army officials and one security guard.
- Operation Rising Lion (13 June 2025 – 24 June 2025) – Bombing nuclear facilities, military installations, and the private residences of senior Iranian officials.
- Operation Shield of Judah (28 February 2026 – present) – Along with the United States, Israeli and American forces launched strikes against various cities in Iran.

=== Strikes and alleged strikes in Syria ===
- Jamraya airstrike (30 January 2013) – Alleged Israeli airstrike on a Syrian convoy transporting weapons to Hezbollah. Other sources stated the targeted site was a military research center in Jamraya responsible for developing biological and chemical weapons.
- Airstrikes on Syria (May 3 and 5, 2013) – Airstrikes on Syria against long-ranged weapons sent from Iran to Hezbollah.
- Latakia explosion (5 July 2013) – Alleged Israeli airstrike on a Syrian depot containing Russian-made Yakhont anti-ship missiles.
- Snawbar airstrike (30 October 2013) – Alleged Israeli airstrike at an air defense site in Snawbar.
- Latakia attack (26 January 2014) – Alleged Israeli airstrike against a Syrian warehouse of S-300 missiles.
- Beqaa Valley airstrike (24 February 2014) – Two airstrikes against a Hezbollah missile base in Lebanon near the border with Syria.
- Rif Dimashq airstrikes (7 December 2014) – Alleged Israeli airstrikes in Syria against a warehouse of advanced S-300 missiles, which were en route to Hezbollah in Lebanon.
- Mazraat Amal airstrike (18 January 2015) – Alleged Israeli airstrike in Quneitra against Hezbollah and Iranian operatives.
- Qalamoun airstrike (25 April 2015) – Israeli airstrikes against Hezbollah camps and weapons convoys in two brigade bases of Qalamoun region.
- Bekaa Valley airstrike (21 June 2015) – Israeli airstrike against targets in Lebanon's western Bekaa Valley.
- August 2015 Syria Airstrikes (August 20–21, 2015) – Israel launched airstrikes in Syria, after four rockets hit the Golan Heights and Upper Galilee.
- Qalamoun airstrike (31 October 2015) – alleged Israeli airstrike on Hezbollah targets in southern Syria, including a weapons convoy.
- November 2015 Israeli airstrike (11 November 2015) – alleged Israeli airstrike near Damascus airport against Hezbollah weapons warehouses.
- November 2016 Israeli airstrike (30 November 2016) – alleged Israeli airstrike against a Syrian military compound in Damascus and a Hezbollah weapons convoy in the Damascus-Beirut highway.
- December 2016 Israeli airstrike (7 December 2016) – Alleged Israeli airstrike against the Mezzeh airbase near Damascus. A Syrian opposition group said the target was a convoy of chemical weapons en route to Hezbollah.
- January 2017 Israeli airstrike (12 January 2017) – Another alleged Israeli airstrike against the Mezzeh airbase near Damascus, targeting an ammunition depot.
- February 2017 Israeli airstrike (22 February 2017) – Alleged Israeli airstrike on a Hezbollah weapons shipment near Damascus.
- March 2017 Israeli airstrike (17 March 2017) – Alleged incident in which several S-200 missiles were fired at Israeli jet fighters attacking targets in Syria, and one missile was shot down by an "aerial defense system", likely the Arrow 3.
- April 2017 Israeli airstrike (27 April 2017) – Alleged Israeli airstrike felt in Damascus International Airport. The blast was reportedly felt 15 kilometres (9.3 mi) away. Two rebel sources told Reuters that "five strikes hit an ammunition depot used by Iran-backed militias."
- September 2017 Israeli airstrikes (7-21 September 2017) - Israeli airstrikes targeted a chemical facility near the Mediterranean coast (7 September) and an arms depot near Damascus (21 September)
- October 2017 Israeli airstrike (16 October 2017) – Israeli airstrike destroyed an anti-aircraft battery near Damascus.
- November 2017 Israeli airstrike (1 November 2017) – Alleged Israeli airstrike south of Homs.
- December 2017 Israeli airstrikes (3-4 December 2017) - Israeli airstrikes targeted a military site (3 December) and a scientific research center (4 December), both near Damascus.
- February 2018 Israel–Syria incident (10 February 2018) - An Israeli F-16 was shot down by the Syrian Air Defense Force after conducting an air raid on Iran-backed positions inside Syria. The aircraft was part of a larger Israeli aerial dispatch which Israel said was sent in response to detection of an Iranian drone spying on Israel.
- May 2018 Israel–Iran incidents (10 May 2018) - After Iranian forces reportedly fired around 20 projectiles towards Israeli army positions in the Golan Heights without causing damage or casualties, Israel responded with airstrikes against Iranian bases in Syria.
- Syria missile strikes (September 2018) (17 September 2018)
- Syria says Israeli jets carry out airstrike near Aleppo, targeted several depots at an industrial zone near Aleppo Airport. At least four warehouse guards were killed. (28 March 2019)
- Syria missile strikes (August 2019) (25 August 2019)
- Syria missile strikes (November 2019) (20 November 2019)
- Israeli air force killed 23 Syrian and foreign fighters, including Eight Syrian air defense soldiers on multiple strikes in Rif-Dimashq Governorate and Daraa. (6 February 2020)
- Israeli airstrikes hit Syrian army and paramilitaries, including Hezbollah fighters positions in south of Damascus and Daraa, killing one civilian, three government troops, and seven foreign fighters. (31 August 2020)
- Israel launches air strikes on Iran-linked targets in Syria. The strikes killed 10, including three Syrian soldiers and at least five Iranians. (18 November 2020)
- Syria's military reported Israeli warplanes have bombed locations south of the capital Damascus, killing at least eight pro-Iran militias fighters. (24 November 2020)
- Israeli airstrikes target pro-Iran weapons facilities in Hama, kill 6. Missiles were reportedly launched over Lebanese territory. (25 December 2020)
- Israeli airstrikes hit sites around Damascus, reportedly killed three Iran-backed fighters. (6 January 2021)
- Israeli airstrikes on multiple locations in eastern Syria killed 57 regime forces and Shia militia fighters. This was the deadliest attack by Israel forces since the start of the conflict. (12-13 January 2021)
- Israeli airstrike on Iran's consulate in Syria reportedly killed 2 generals and 5 other officers. (1 April 2024)
- Operation Arrow of Bashan (8 December 2024–present)

== See also ==
- History of the Israel Defense Forces
- History of the Israeli Air Force
- Israeli casualties of war
- Israeli war crimes
- List of Mossad operations
- List of wars involving Israel
- Military operations of the Israeli–Palestinian conflict
- Violent conflicts involving the Yishuv
