= Santorini (disambiguation) =

Santorini is a Greek island in the Mediterranean's Aegean Sea.

Santorini may also refer to:

== Arts and entertainment ==
- Santorini (game), a 1985 abstract strategy board game
- Santorini (novel), Alistair MacLean's final 1986 thriller
- "Santorini", a song from Yanni's 1986 album Keys to Imagination

== People with the surname ==
- Al Santorini (born 1948), American baseball player
- Giovanni Domenico Santorini (1681–1737), Italian anatomist

== Produce ==
- Santorini (wine), a Greek wine region
- Santorini Brewing Company
- Santorini tomato, a tomato cultivar

== Regions ==
- Roman Catholic Diocese of Santorini
- Santorini caldera, the wider archipelago
- Santorini (peripheral unit), the wider region of Greece

== Watercraft ==
- Santorini, a boat captured during the 2002 Santorini affair
- MV Express Santorini, a Greek passenger ferry

== Other uses ==
- Santorini (Thira) International Airport, Kamari, Greece
- Duct of Santorini, a part of the human pancreas

== See also ==
- Santorin (disambiguation)
- List of names derived from Santoro
- Santoro
