= Santoro =

Santoro is an Italian surname derived from Latin name Santorus (festum Omnium Sanctorum, "feast of all the saints").

== People with the surname ==
- Alfredo Santoro, Argentine boxer
- Andrea Santoro, Italian Catholic priest
- Betty Santoro, American activist for LGBT rights
- Billy Santoro, American gay pornographic film actor
- Cláudio Santoro, Brazilian composer
- Eugenio Santoro, Swiss Italian sculptor
- Fabrice Santoro, French tennis player
- Fada Santoro, Brazilian actress
- Flavio Santoro (born 2001), German-Italian footballer
- Francesco Raffaello Santoro, Italian painter
- Geraldine Santoro, American woman who died of a back-alley abortion in 1964
- Giulio Antonio Santoro, Roman Catholic prelate who served as Archbishop of Cosenza
- Giuseppe Santoro (diplomat), Italian lawyer and diplomat
- Giuseppe Santoro (general), Italian general
- Jorge Santoro, Brazilian professional football player and coach
- Leandro Santoro, Argentine politician
- Márcio Santoro, Brazilian co-president and co-founder of Agência África
- Matthew Santoro, Canadian YouTube personality
- Michele Santoro, Italian journalist
- Miguel Ángel Santoro, Argentine football manager and former goalkeeper
- Roberto Jorge Santoro, Argentine poet
- Rodrigo Santoro, Brazilian actor
- Rubens Santoro, Italian painter
- Sal Santoro, American politician
- Salvatore Santoro (mobster), underboss of the Lucchese crime family
- Santo Santoro, Australian politician
- Vittorio Santoro, Italian/Swiss visual artist
- Walter Santoro, Uruguayan lawyer and politician

== Fictional characters ==
- Gabriel Santoro, a character in the novel Third and Indiana
- Nicky Santoro, a character in the film Casino
- Ofelia Santoro, a character in the novel Third and Indiana
- Rick Santoro, a character in the film Snake Eyes

== See also ==
- Santori
- Santorio
