= Giuseppe Santoro =

Giuseppe Santoro may refer to:

- Giuseppe Santoro (diplomat) (born 1930)
- Giuseppe Santoro (general) (1894–1975)
