= Fajr-3 (artillery rocket) =

Type of multiple-launch rocket launcher

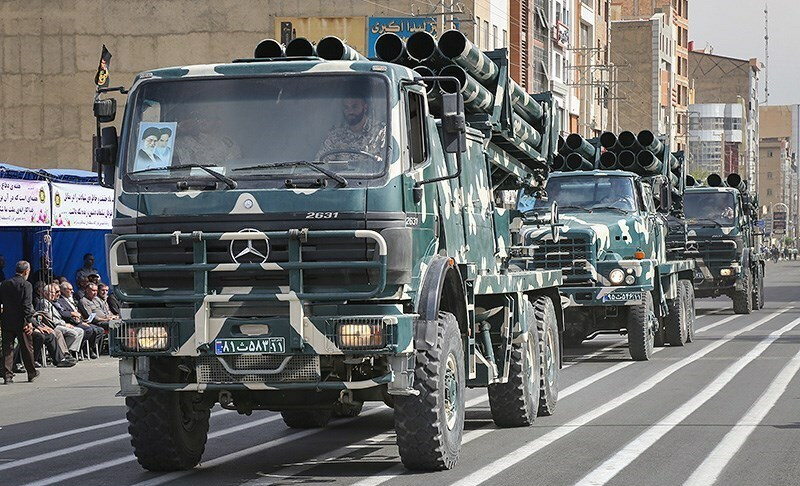
- A Fajr-3 on a Mercedes 2631 chassis in 2018, followed by its predecessor, the M-1985.
- Type: Rocket artillery
- Place of origin: Iran

Service history
- In service: 1996–present
- Used by: See § Operators
- Wars: 2006 Lebanon War; Syrian Civil War

Production history
- Manufacturer: Shahid Bagheri Industrial Group
- Produced: 1990 or 1996 – ?

Specifications
- Mass: 15,000 kg (launcher); 45 kg (HE content); 90 kg (warhead); 407 kg (rocket)
- Length: 10 m (launcher); 5,200 mm (rocket)
- Width: 2.5 m (launcher)
- Height: 3.34 m (launcher)
- Diameter: 240mm
- Caliber: 240 mm
- Elevation: 0 to 57 degrees
- Traverse: 90 degrees left/100 degrees right
- Rate of fire: 4–8 seconds 12 rounds in 48-96 seconds (est)
- Maximum firing range: 43 km
- Engine: 280 hp, V-8 liquid-cooled, diesel engine
- Maximum speed: 60 km/h (road); 25 km/h (off-road)

The Fajr-3 (rarely Fadjr-3) (Persian: فجر-۳) is an Iranian heavy 240 mm intermediate-range multiple-launch artillery rocket (MLRS). The Fajr-3 is a license-built copy, with slight modifications, of a North Korean MLRS called the M-1985. The Fajr-3 was introduced in the 1990s and has since been exported to Syria, Hamas and Hezbollah.

The Fajr-3 launcher fires twelve 5.2-meter-long, 240 millimeter-calibre Fajr-3 artillery rockets, with a range of 43 kilometres, weighing 407 kilograms each and carrying 90-kilogram fragmentation warheads with 45 kg of high explosive (HE). Fajr means 'dawn' in Arabic.

== History ==
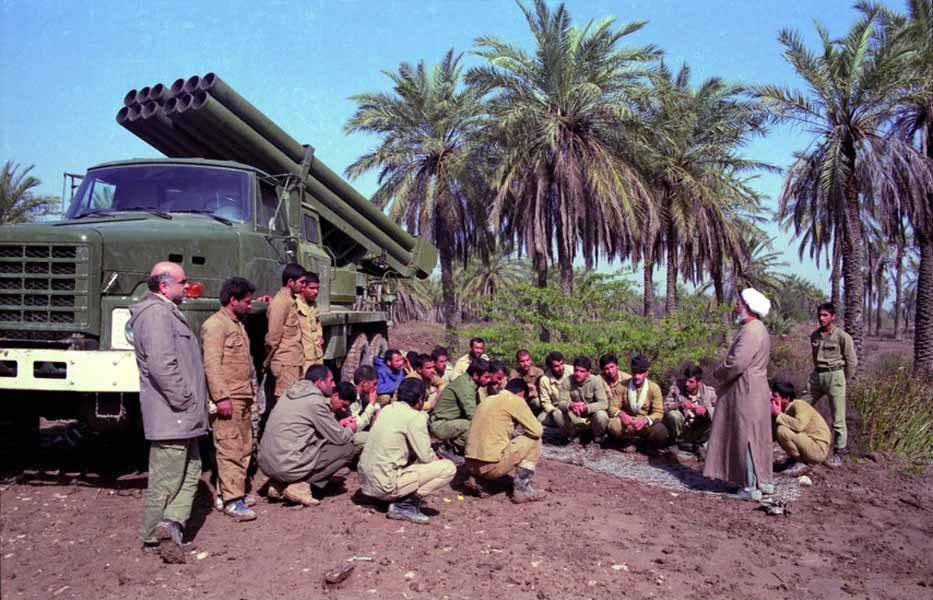
The Fajr-3 is a copy of the North Korean M-1985 (seen here.)

During the Iran–Iraq War, around 100 North Korean M-1985 MLRS systems were exported to Iran. The North Korean M-1985 was derived from Soviet Katyushas, and so the Fajr-3 is sometimes considered a Katyusha too. With North Korean assistance, Iran's state-run Shahid Bagheri Industries later began to produce the system under license.

A minority of sources report that the Fajr-3 is built by Parchin Missile Industries.

Dates for the production of the Fajr-3 are very unclear. Iranian Defense Minister Akbar Torkan announced in March 1990 that mass production of the Fajr-3 had started. Analysts in Abu Dhabi learned about the development less than a month later and described it as "one of the most important new weapons" entering production in Iran.

However, it was not until November 6, 1996 that Iran announced that they had actually built a Fajr-3 system. The system was tested that same month and entered service that year. This discrepancy in start date may be the difference between first building a copy, and then an improved version of the system. The development program for the Fajr-3 might have been run in conjunction with the development of the Oghab.

Early versions of the Fajr-3 apparently had reduced range and it was not until December 1998 that Iran tested a rocket with the full 43 km range. Fajr-3 rockets are known to have still been in production in 2006.

== Description ==
A complete Fajr-3 system is manned by a crew of five and also includes one dedicated resupply vehicle with a crane.

=== Launcher ===
The Fajr-3 launcher has twelve tubes in two groups of six. The Fajr-3 system was first installed on the same Japanese Izuzu chassis used by the North Korean M-1985. It was later installed on Mercedes-Benz 2624 series chassis, and today is uniformly used on Mercedes-Benz 2631 chassis. Apart from the chassis differences, which are trivial, there are no Fajr-3 variants. The launcher is unarmored and weighs 15000 kg when unloaded. It can fire rockets singly or in salvo.

The US Army reports that the Fajr-3 has no fire-control system, while Iran's Defense Industries Organization reports that the Fajr-3 has a computer system with indigenous software that can calculate range and azimuth.

The Fajr-3 launcher is 10 m long, 2.5m wide, and 3.34m tall (when traveling). (Note: The older Fajr-3 launcher, on a Mercedes 2624 chassis, has slightly larger dimensions; see the brochure) The tubes are 5.36 m long, fire for maximum range when set to 57˚, and have a maximum azimuth of 90-100 degrees.

=== Rocket ===
The rocket is solid fueled and has a fragmentation high explosive warhead. The rocket is 5.2 meters long, 240mm in diameter, and weighs 407 kg. It has wraparound fins for stabilization in flight, which reach a diameter of 512 mm when extended. The rocket also has spin-stabilization, but is not guided. The rocket's double layer propulsion burns for an average time of 4 seconds, reaching a peak velocity of 930 m/s.

Sources differ on whether the Fajr-3 rocket has an 85 kg warhead or a 90 kg warhead. The warhead contains 45 kg of HE and the rest of metal pellets for fragmentation. The warhead is detonated by a nose-mounted impact fuse. In 2018 Iran announced an assembly line for proximity fuses for a variety of rockets and guided missiles, including the Fajr-3. One source reports that Fajr-3 rockets can likely carry (plain) high explosive, submunitions, incendiary, smoke, or chemical payloads as well.

The shelf life of a Fajr-3 rocket is 15 years.

=== Reloading ===
When the Fajr-3 is reloaded, the launch tubes (in two groups of six) are detached from the launcher and laid on the ground by a crane. Then, a machine called a "Loading machine" is used to mechanically press the heavy Fajr-3 rockets into their launch tubes one by one. When all the tubes are filled, the crane is used to reattach the launch tubes to the vehicle. A reload is estimated to take 12–15 minutes. Because of the long reload time and large size of the "Loading machine" (10.4m), the Fajr-3 MLRS is supposed to retreat after firing to safer rear battle areas to reload.

== Operational history ==
=== Iran ===
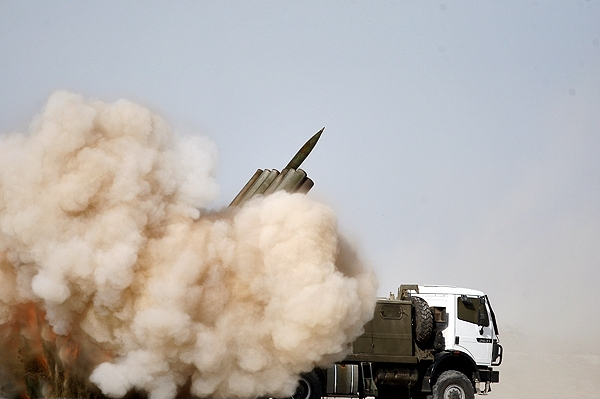
A Fajr-3 firing at an exercise in 2010.

Iran used the Fajr-3 in an exercise in 2010 (see right). The Fajr-3 is likely to be in Iran's inventory for decades. One assessment of the system's capability is that its small number of rockets, combined with the poor accuracy of MLRS systems, means that the Fajr-3 is unlikely to be tactically effective.

The Fajr-3 is used in service alongside nine of the original North Korean-built M-1985 systems, which are still on their original chassis.

=== Lebanon ===
Hezbollah maintains Fajr-3 rockets, as well as other unguided rocket artillery systems, to fire onto Israel in war.

Fajr-3 rockets sent to Hezbollah are subsidized by the Iranian government. They are flown into Syria, then sent into Lebanon by Hezbollah agents, and are believed to be stored in southern Lebanon.

The date the first Fajr-3 rockets were supplied to Hezbollah is unclear; some sources report the early 2000s, possibly 2002 specifically, while other sources report the late 1990s. (Note: Reports that Hezbollah acquired and used Fajr-3 rockets in 1996 (e.g.) are today considered wrong.))

==== 2006 Lebanon War ====
Fajr-3 MLRS were used in small numbers in the 2006 Lebanon War. The Israeli Air Force identified the Fajr-3, along with other medium- and long-range artillery rockets, as their main target in the war, and attempted to destroy them in a large attack in the beginning of the war. Similarly, Hezbollah viewed their Fajr-3 systems and similar rockets as their "centerpiece for operational planning" in the lead-up to the war. In Hezbollah use, the Fajr-3 was also known as the "Raad-1".

At least some of Hezbollah's Fajr-3 rockets survived Israel's initial wave of airstrikes, and "tens" were fired sporadically at Israel over the course of the war, mainly targeting the Israeli city of Haifa. The rockets' long range meant that they were mostly deployed from north of the Litani River. Hezbollah's Fajr-3 MLRS were operated in a mobile fashion, not from fixed locations, and were reportedly controlled from a Hezbollah headquarters in Tyre. Hezbollah is estimated to have had 24-30 launchers at the beginning of the war; the number that survived is unknown.

=== Iraq ===
A Fajr-3 rocket was fired by unidentified Iraqi groups on September 11, 2007, and injured an American soldier in Baghdad.

=== Gaza ===
In 2009, Israel targeted Fajr-3 rockets, among other weapons, that were being smuggled to Hamas in Gaza via Sudan.

== Operators ==
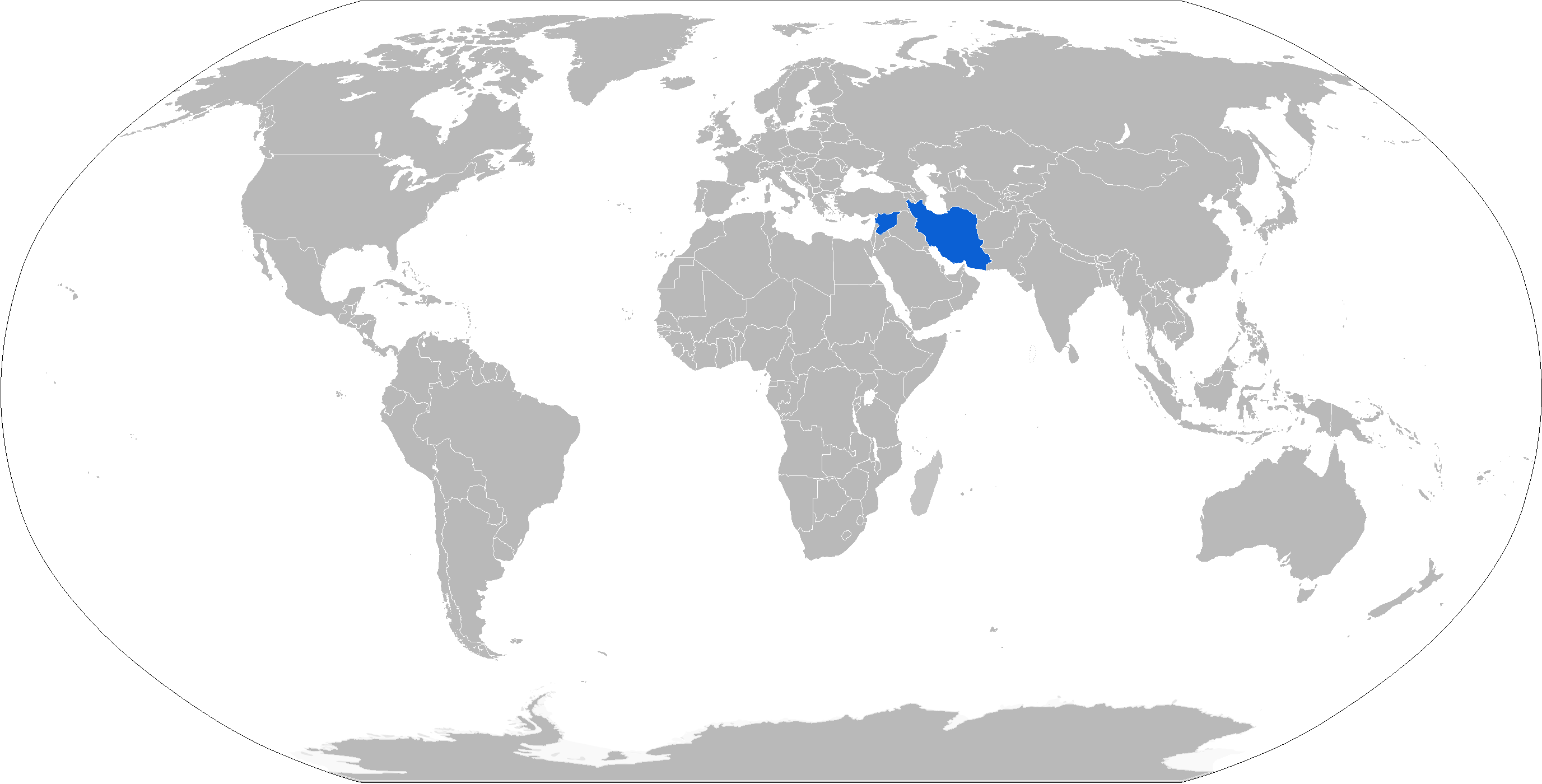
Map with Fajr-3 operators in blue

=== State operators ===
- Iran – sources differ; one reports approximately 100 launchers; another approximately 10 launchers
  - Islamic Republic of Iran Army Ground Forces
  - Navy of the Islamic Revolutionary Guard Corps
- Syria

=== Non-state operators ===
- Hezbollah – a few dozen launchers
- Hamas – up to fifty rockets
