= Márcio Santoro =

Brazilian marketer (born 1970)

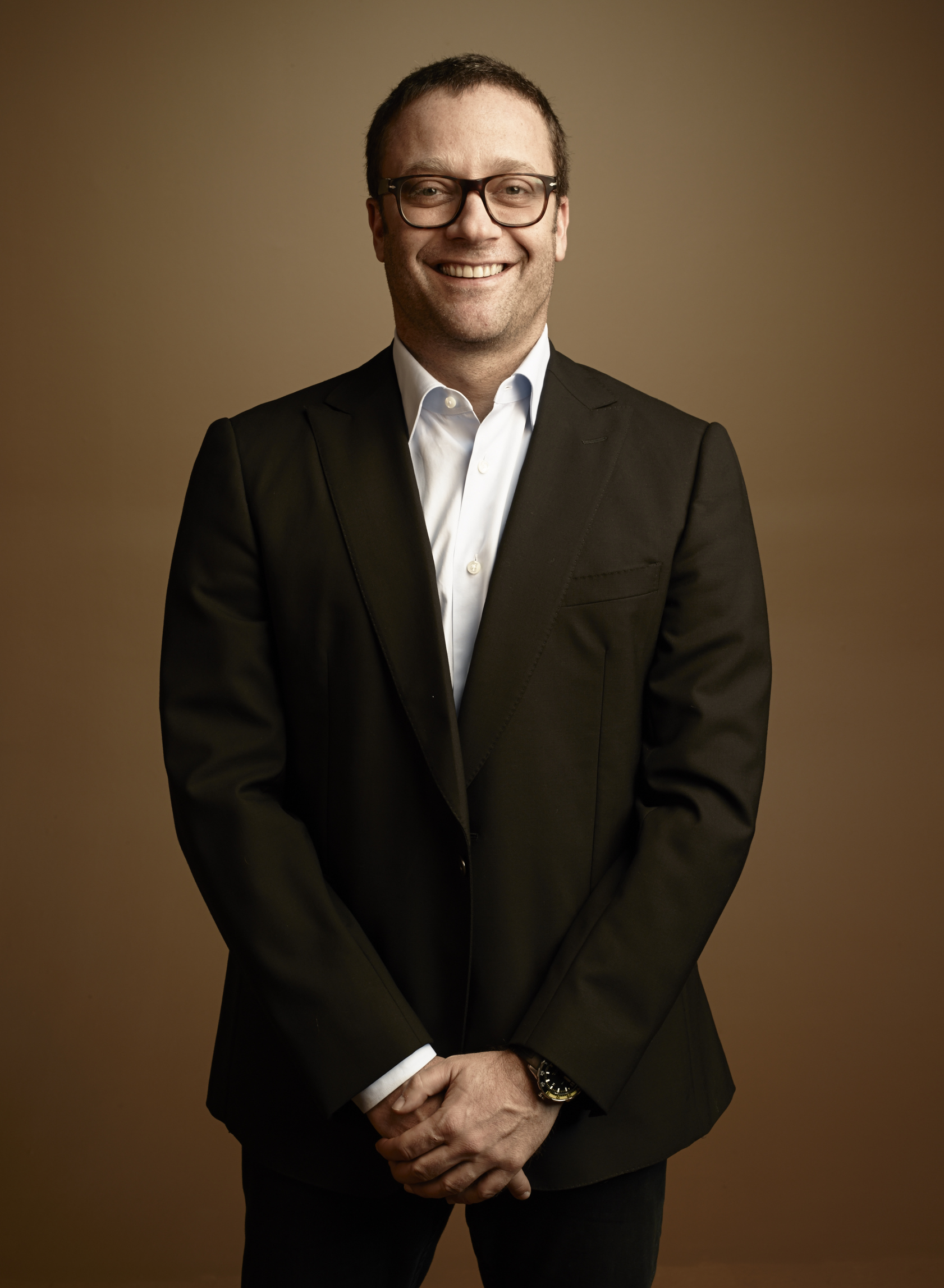
- Born: August 29, 1970 (age 56); Brazil
- Education: School of Advertising and Marketing ESPM and Harvard Business School
- Occupations: Co-president and co-founder of ABC Group - Grupo ABC and Agência Africa

Márcio Santoro (São Paulo, August 29, 1970) is co-president and co-founder of Agência África, one of the ten largest advertising agency in Brazil, and a partner of the ABC Group, the largest communications holding company in Latin America.

== Career ==
Santoro began his career as an advertising agent at 17 years of age as an intern at the advertising agency DPZ. In the following years, he worked for the Lowe and DM9DDB advertising agencies. Márcio graduated from the School of Advertising and Marketing ESPM, specialized in integrated communication at Kellogg School of Management, and has a graduate degree from the Owners and President Management (OPM) course from Harvard Business School.

In December 2002, Santoro founded Africa, an ABC Group advertising agency, the largest communications holding company in Latin America, with partners Nizan Guanaes, Sergio Gordilho, Luiz Fernando Vieira and Olivia Machado. From 2008 to 2014, Africa was voted the most admired advertising agency in the market by Carta Capital magazine.

In 2010, he became co-director of Africa alongside Sergio Gordilho. (Folha) Under his leadership, Africa is responsible for the communication of brands Itaú, Brahma, Vivo, Procter & Gamble, among others. In December 2014, Márcio became a member of the ABC Group, the largest communications holding company in Latin America and 19th largest in the world.

== Recognition ==
In 2006, Márcio Santoro won the Caboré award for Best Service Professional. Santoro was awarded best Director/Entrepreneur of the Communication Industry with the Caboré, a Brazilian communications industry award and Director of the Year by the Association of Advertising Professionals in 2014.

Also in 2014, Márcio was voted one of the top 10 communications professional, according to Meio e Mensagem. In the same year, 2014, Africa was voted the International Agency of the Year by Advertising Age, a key American advertising magazine, for his work in digital media for Procter & Gamble and for designing Banco Itaú's commercials during the 2014 FIFA World Cup appointed by Adweek, advertising publication, as one of the most creative agencies in the world. Africa also received the DCI Award - Most Admired Companies under the 2014 Marketing and Advertising category.
