= Santori =

Santori is an Italian and Greek Cypriot surname derived from Latin name Santorus (festum Omnium Sanctorum). It is loosely defined as 'Of the Saints' or 'One who made saintly images'. Globally, approximately 5,645 people bear this surname. Santori may also refer to:

== People ==
- Francesco Antonio Santori, Italian writer, poet and playwright of Arbëreshë descent
- Fufi Santori, American BSN basketball player
- Giulio Antonio Santori, Italian cardinal of the Roman Catholic Church.
- Sandy Santori, Canadian politician

== See also ==
- Santorio
- Santoro
- List of names derived from Santoro
