= List of names derived from Santoro =

Names derived from Santoro (from Latin: sanctus, lit. 'saint') include the following:

- Santori
- Santorio
- Santorelli
- Santorielli
- Santorini
- Santorinite (an igneous rock)
- Santorum
