= Iran–Israel proxy conflict in Sudan =

Series of air strikes in Sudan allegedly conducted by Israel

- Part of the Iran–Israel proxy conflict
- Location: Port Sudan, Sudan; 19°37′0″N 37°13′0″E
- Date: January – February 2009
- Executed by: Israel
- Casualties: 119 civilians killed
- Location of Port Sudan in Sudan

In January and February 2009, there was a series of two air strikes in Sudan and one in the Red Sea (code-named "Birds of Prey"), allegedly conducted by Israel against Iranian arms being smuggled to the Gaza Strip through Sudan. The Israeli government hinted that Israeli forces were involved in the incident.

== Raid ==
Amos Harel, military correspondent for the Israeli daily Haaretz, wrote that the decision to strike in Sudan apparently originated in a belief that Iran was about to inject a significant quantity of arms into Gaza, possibly 70-kilometer-range Fajr-3 rockets. A story in The Sunday Times also reported that the trucks were transporting Fajr-3 rockets, which had been brought by Iranian Revolutionary Guard Corps to the Port Sudan and given to local smugglers. The article also stated that the strike was conducted by unmanned Elbit Hermes 450s. However, Time magazine reported that the strike was F-16s escorted by F-15s and UAVs. On April 8, Yediot Aharonot, quoting an American source, reported that Israeli naval commando (Shayetet 13) forces were involved in the operation, which included an attack on an Iranian arms ship docking in Sudan.

Former IAF commander Eitan Ben-Eliyahu said the main difficulty in such an attack is precise intelligence. Getting to the target requires a flight of about two and a half hours, presumably on a southerly flight path along the Red Sea coast, under the Saudi and Egyptian radar and with aerial refueling. The incident was first mentioned in mass media by CBS News on March 25. On May 26, Sudanese defense minister Abdel Rahim Mohammed Hussein claimed that the convoy was made up of 1,000 civilians and was involved in "a smuggling process at the border with Egypt". The minister alleged that 119 people were killed; among them were 56 smugglers and 63 smuggled persons from Ethiopian, Somali and other nationalities.

== Reactions ==
- Sudan – Sudanese Foreign Ministry spokesman Ali al-Sadig said: "We are still trying to verify it. Most probably it involved Israel", and added that the convoys were probably smuggling goods, not weapons. He said "it is illegal to infringe the sovereignty of another country". According to another Sudanese source quoted by the al-Jazeera network, in one of the attacks Israel sank a ship carrying weapons.
- Israel – Outgoing Israeli Prime Minister Ehud Olmert said in a conference in Herzliya: "We operate everywhere we can hit terrorist infrastructure - in nearby places, in places further away, anywhere we can strike them in a way that increases deterrence. Everyone can use their imagination. Those who need to know, know there is no place where Israel cannot operate. Such a place doesn't exist".
- United States – On March 27, two American officials confirmed that Israeli warplanes bombed a convoy of trucks in Sudan.
- Hezbollah – On March 28, Hezbollah released a statement calling on Arab states to denounce the strikes and characterized them as an Israeli crime.
- Hamas – Hamas leader Salah al-Bardawil told Agence France-Presse that "First of all we are not sure any convoy has been hit, but it is ironic to link these convoys to Hamas. Should it turn out that there were raids and a high number of people killed, this would mean Israel is seeking to use the opportunity to blame Hamas and hit Sudan".

== Further strikes ==
A land cruiser was struck by a missile in Port Sudan on April 7, 2011. Sudan blamed Israel for the strike, which was reported to have either killed or wounded Abdul Latif Ashkar, Hamas's logistics officer. A lengthy article at WRMEA agreed with Sudan about Israel conducting the strike and angrily condemned Israel, but also seemed to undercut Sudanese Foreign Minister Ali Karti's quoted view that Israel conducted the strike to prevent Sudan from being removed from sanctions and isolation related to its previous support for terrorism: a follow-up quote from The Jerusalem Post discussed Iranian arms smuggling to the Gaza Strip, with the article confirming that Hamas was shipping weapons through the Sudan to Hamas, and stated that Israel was attempting to counter Iran's influence in the area (which the article implicitly stated was linked to material support for terrorists).

Some Sudanese newspapers reported that Israeli aircraft attacked Gaza-bound arms convoys in late 2011.

Sudan claimed that on October 23, 2012, four Israeli aircraft attacked a munition factory south of Khartoum.

== See also ==
- Karine A affair
- Ain es Saheb airstrike
- Operation Outside the Box
- Francop Affair
- Yarmouk munitions factory explosion
- Iranian intervention in Sudan (2023–present)
