= Ain es Saheb airstrike =

2003 airstrike by Israel in Syria

- Part of the Al-Aqsa Intifada
- IAF video of the strike
- Operational scope: Strategic
- Objective: Destruction of the site in Ain es Saheb, Syria
- Date: 5 October 2003
- Executed by: Israeli Air Force
- Outcome: Successful strike on alleged militant site
- Casualties: 1 injured munitions destroyed

The Ain es Saheb airstrike occurred on 5 October 2003 and was the first overt Israeli military operation in Syria since the 1973 Yom Kippur War.

== Operation ==
In response to the suicide bombing in Haifa 12 hours earlier by Palestinian Islamic Jihad (PIJ), four Israeli Air Force 110 "Knights of the North" Squadron F-16Cs attacked an alleged Palestinian militant training camp about 24 kilometres (15 miles) northwest of the Syrian capital Damascus. A single civilian guard was reportedly injured in the strike, the first in Syrian territory in nearly thirty years. The jets took off from Ramat David Airbase at 03:00 and headed north over the Mediterranean before turning east, crossing the coastline into Lebanon and approaching the target from the west. It is uncertain whether the aircraft actually crossed the border into Syria proper as the exact type of munitions used is unknown and the target is located close to the Syrian-Lebanese border.

== Militant camp claims ==
The Israel Defense Forces (IDF) claimed the camp was used by PIJ and other Palestinian militant factions to train recruits in bomb assembly and guerrilla warfare. It released footage of the camp taken from the Al-Arabia TV station showing hundreds of weapons and tunnels packed with arms and ammunition. Syria and PIJ denied Israeli claims. A Popular Front for the Liberation of Palestine General Command (PFLP-GC) official told the Associated Press that the base was one of the group's abandoned camps. Palestinian sources in Beirut, however, reported the facility belongs to the Popular Front for the Liberation of Palestine (PFLP) and had been a training base for PIJ and Hamas. These same sources reported a weapons workshop at the site, lending support to reports by the attacking pilots of secondary explosions.

The airstrike was Israel's first operation inside Syria in 30 years.

== Reactions and legacy ==
Syria, Jordan, and Egypt condemned the attack, but did not do anything more than issue strongly wordly protests. Israel described the operation as a measured response to the Haifa suicide bombing. Israeli official Dore Gold stated that "Israel had to send the message it cannot be repeatedly struck with impunity."

Syrian Foreign Minister Farouk al-Sharaa warned several weeks after the airstrike that his country would act if Israel attacked again, saying "Don’t forget there are many Israeli settlements in the Golan." Chief of Staff of the Syrian Army Hassan Turkmani stated that while Syria did not respond to the Israeli action, it was "fully capable of deterring Israel". Former diplomat Michael Eisenstadt noted Syria's lack of retaliation to this strike, Operation Outside the Box, and the assassination of Muhammad Suleiman.

== See also ==
- Operation Orchard
- 2008 Abu Kamal raid
- 2019 Balakot airstrike
