= Tyre raid =

Israeli operation in the 2006 Lebanon War

2006 Tyre raid
- Part of 2006 Lebanon War
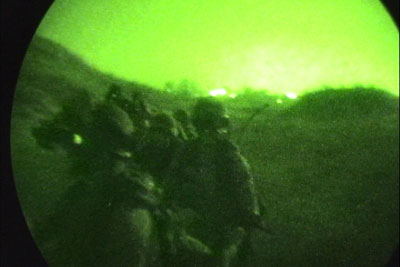
- An IDF Shayetet 13 filmed during the operation in Tyre.
Date	August 5, 2006
Location	Tyre, Lebanon
Result	Hezbollah victory

Belligerents
Israel	Hezbollah

Units involved
Shayetet 13	Armed wing

Casualties and losses
10 soldiers wounded 1 soldier killed (Hezbollah claim)	1–2 killed (Lebanese claim); 6–10 killed (IDF claim)
- 1 Lebanese soldier and 4 civilians killed (Lebanese claim)

The Tyre raid was a night mission by the Israel Defense Forces naval commando unit, Shayetet 13, in Tyre, South Lebanon, on August 5, 2006. The target was an apartment building, allegedly housing Hezbollah leaders responsible for the rocket attack on Hadera a day earlier. The entire operation lasted 1 hour and 45 minutes.

== The raid ==
Lebanese sources reported that the IDF commando forces arrived in helicopters around 1:00 a.m. and landed in an orange grove near the city's northern environs. The troops cut through a fence and opened fire on a second floor apartment of an apartment building, which was the apparent target of the raid. The apartment was hit by fire, and eyewitnesses reported its occupants were wounded.

When withdrawing from the building exchanges of fire between Israeli soldiers and Hezbollah gunmen erupted, with Israeli Air Force helicopter gunships providing the soldiers on the ground with fire-support. The clashes were described by Hezbollah spokesman as an "ambush". Some three hours later, at around 4:00 a.m., the soldiers withdrew from the area. Two severely wounded soldiers, as well as the other casualties, were airlifted to the Rambam Hospital in Haifa, Israel. The targeted apartment building was bombed into rubble by an Israeli jet later in the afternoon.

IDF claimed to have shot “two or three Hezbollah commanders” thereby “taking out” a key guerrilla unit involved in firing long-range rockets into Israel. Hezbollah claimed it had successfully repulsed the attack.

According to the IDF "at least six", seven or ten Hezbollah fighters were killed in the clashes while 10 IDF soldiers were wounded, two of them seriously. According to Lebanese sources one or two Hezbollah fighters, a Lebanese army soldier and at least four civilians were killed in the raid.

IDF later admitted that the Hezbollah squad holed up in the apartment refused to surrender and that the Hezbollah commanders managed to escape. Hezbollah resumed rocket launching from the site within hours of the raid.

== Sources ==
- Blanford, Nicholas (2011). Warriors of God, Inside Hezbollah's thirty-year struggle against Israel. New York: Random House.
