= Escola Superior de Propaganda e Marketing =

Private higher education institution in Brazil

Higher School of Advertising and Marketing
- Escola Superior de Propaganda e Marketing
- Motto: Latin: Docet qui facit
- Motto in English: Taught by who does it
- Type: Private
- Established: 1951
- President: Dalton Pastore Jr.
- Academic staff: 628
- Students: 9,700
- Undergraduates: 7,000
- Postgraduates: 2,700
- Location: São Paulo, Rio de Janeiro and Porto Alegre, Brazil; 23.58997°S 46.63992°W
- Campus: Urban
- Colors: Red and White
- Website: www.espm.br

The Higher School of Advertising and Marketing (Portuguese: Escola Superior de Propaganda e Marketing, ESPM) is a private higher education institution in Brazil.

The institution is regarded as the leading college for Marketing and Advertising in Brazil. The Advertising program at ESPM-SP ranks first in the Folha University Ranking according to the market evaluation.

== History ==
The school was founded by Rodolfo Lima Martensen, a Brazilian radio host and advertising executive, at the request of media mogul Assis Chateaubriand, owner of Diários Associados, at the time the largest media conglomerate in Brazil, and Pietro Maria Bardi, then director of the São Paulo Museum of Art. A room in the museum served as the school's first location, where it was named "Escola de Propaganda do Museu de Arte de São Paulo" (Advertising School of the São Paulo Museum of Art). Under Martensen's management, with the motto "Taught by who does it", the school congregated professionals in the advertising business to teach its lone course in Advertising, and to this day stands by the philosophy of associating practice with theory in most of its many undergraduate programs.

In 1955, now called "Escola de Propaganda de São Paulo" (Advertising School of São Paulo), it moved to its own premises within the same building, and was denominated "Superior", meaning "of higher education". In 1971, school director Otto Hugo Scherb proposed a name change to "Escola Superior de Propaganda e Marketing", which was approved and has been kept to this day. With the support of Antônio Delfim Netto, then Minister of Finance and representative of the University of São Paulo, the course in Advertising was made into a 4-year undergraduate course and was recognized by the Ministry of Education.

In 1974, with the backing of the Globo Organization, a new campus was founded in Rio de Janeiro, and in 1978, ESPM started offering its first graduate courses, the choice of which was greatly expanded in 1981 by school president Francisco Gracioso, who also created ESPM's second ever undergraduate course, Business Administration with emphasis in Marketing. A third campus was created in Porto Alegre in 1985. Following the turn of the century, the school created doctorate and academic research programs, and introduced many other undergraduate courses, including Design, International Relations, Journalism, Information Systems, Social and Consumer Science, and Cinema/Audiovisual.

Currently, there are two campuses in São Paulo (one for undergraduate education, another for graduate education and post-secondary learning), one in Rio de Janeiro and another in Porto Alegre.
