= Santorin =

Santorin may refer to:

- Santorin (gamer)
- Santorín (horse)
- the German name for Santorini
