= Muhammad Suleiman =

Syrian General (1959–2008)

Muhammad Suleiman محمد سليمان

Personal details
- Born: 1959 Tartus, Syria
- Died: 1 August 2008 (aged 48–49) Tartus, Ba'athist Syria
- Party: Syrian Regional Branch of the Arab Socialist Ba'ath Party
- Occupation: National Security Adviser to the President

Military service
- Allegiance: Ba'athist Syria
- Branch/service: Syrian Arab Army
- Years of service: 1985–2008
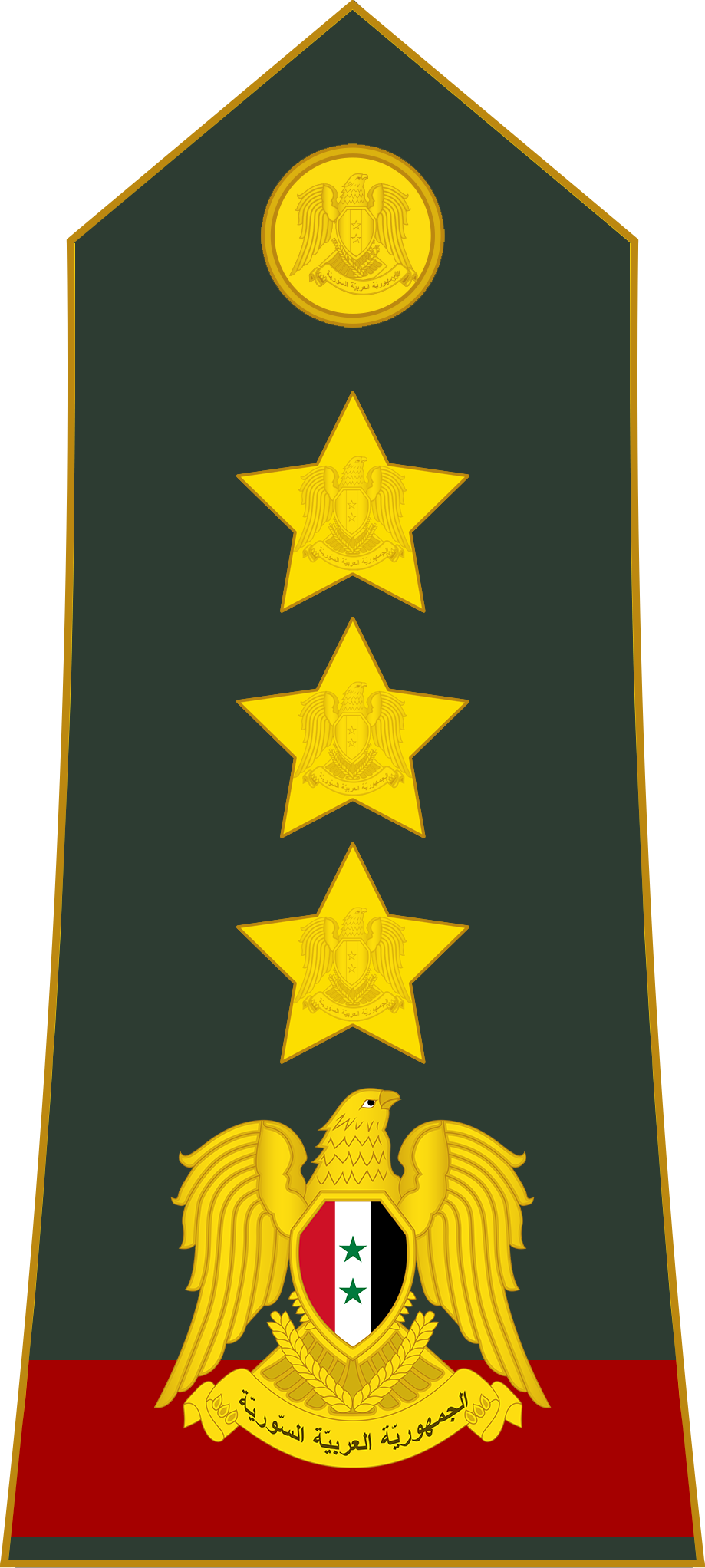
- Rank: Brigadier General

Muhammad Suleiman (Arabic: محمد سليمان; 1959 – 1 August 2008) was a Syrian Brigadier General and Special Presidential Advisor for Arms Procurement and Strategic Weapons to President Bashar al-Assad.

He was killed in Tartus, Syria on 1 August 2008 in an Israeli special forces operation.

== Early life ==
Suleiman was born in 1959 to a rich aristocratic Alawite family from Duraykish.

== Career ==
In 1985, he graduated from the College of Mechanical Engineering at University of Damascus. After his graduation, he joined the course of a leadership engineer at the Military College and graduated with the rank of Captain engineer, had three children. He was one of the first to excel in the Military College, which made it easy for him to get close to Bassel al-Assad at the time, and then he was appointed as a leading engineer officer in the Syrian Republican Guard in the battalion that was headed by Bassel al-Assad.

He was sent to Soviet Union to develop a tank weapon for the Syrian Republican Guard and obtained a master’s degree, then doctorate in developing artillery weapons. After his return in 1990, he assumed the position of director of Colonel Bassel al-Assad’s office and his special advisor for military affairs. He was a member of the Special Military Committee for the Armaments Department, which is responsible for purchasing and developing weapons.

In 1994, Bashar al-Assad received the 41st Brigade of the Republican Guard after the death of Bassel al-Assad in a traffic accident. Brigadier General Suleiman assumed the position of director of Bashar al-Assad’s private office. He began managing Bashar al-Assad's special operations room, which is related to the transfer and demobilization of officers and following up on army and security affairs. He established a special office in coordination with the Information Office of the Republican Palace to follow up on the internal situation and everything related to ministries and party institutions. During the death of the late Syrian President Hafez al-Assad in 2000, Suleiman was the head of the operations room that ran the security services.

Former Director General of Mossad Meir Dagan used to refer to him as the "Commander of the Shadow Army". Israel's Military Intelligence AMAN believed he had "extraordinary organizational and logistical abilities". He was also in charge of highly classified military and intelligence work, such as handling relations with the IAEA and the construction of the nuclear Al Kibar facility. He handled secretive intelligence affairs for the president and was reportedly also in charge of arms transfers from Syria to Hezbollah and Hamas in neighbouring Lebanon and Gaza. He had also built very close ties with Hezbollah's chief of staff Imad Mughniyeh and Iranian General Qasem Soleimani.

== Assassination and perpetrators ==
It was reported by Iranian media that Suleiman was shot by a silenced weapon in the head and neck on a beach at al-Rimal al-Zahabiyeh resort near Tartus on 1 August 2008. According to the As-Safir newspaper, arrested Mossad spy Ali Jarrah "testified to have scouted 'certain points' in the coastal town of Tartus in northern Syria," where Suleiman was assassinated. The Sunday Times reported that Suleiman was assassinated by Israeli Special Forces.

A leaked diplomatic cable revealed that France told the United States that Suleiman was probably killed as a result of political rivalry within the Syrian government. Maher al-Assad, brother of the Syrian president, was likely to have ordered the killing. Furthermore, France said that Suleiman was not killed by a sniper, but in fact gunned down in his car.

In a 2009 article regarding the destruction of Al Kibar, Der Spiegel gives a detailed description of Suleiman's assassination as having taken place by sniper shots from a passing yacht and implies that it was linked to his direct involvement in the construction the Al Kibar Nuclear facility and strong ties to Hezbollah and Iran.

In 2015, a National Security Agency document leaked by Edward Snowden revealed that Israel was indeed directly behind Suleiman's killing. According to the document, the assassination was carried out by the Shayetet 13 naval commando unit.

According to a book by Michael Bar-Zohar and Nissim Mishal, Suleiman was assassinated by two Shayetet 13 snipers who had dived to the beach that his villa overlooked from a boat about a mile offshore. The two commandos, whose guns were fitted with silencers, shot him simultaneously after an electronic signal beeped in their earphones, then withdrew.

In 2026, Ehud Olmert, the Israeli prime minister at the time of Suleiman's assassination, wrote in a book that Israeli operatives were indeed behind the killing over Suleiman's involvement with the nuclear reactor in Deir ez-Zor that was destroyed by an Israeli airstrike in Operation Outside the Box. Olmert wrote that Israeli snipers "emerged from the water" and positioned themselves around 150 metres (490 ft) from the terrace where Suleiman was seated alongside guests at his vacation home in Tartus, before firing three shots at him, striking the back of his neck. The snipers withdrew via boat.

== Funeral ==
Suleiman was buried on 3 August 2008. The funeral was attended by Maher al-Assad and Assef Shawkat. The New Yorker quoted an unnamed former Israeli official: "There was no funeral, no event. Nothing. They never admitted that he was killed. He just disappeared".

== Aftermath ==
According to a U.S. State Department cable published by WikiLeaks, Syrian authorities found $80 million in cash in the basement of Suleiman's home. This reportedly upset President Assad, who launched an investigation into how Suleiman obtained that much money.
