= Yarmouk Military Industrial Complex =

Munitions factory in Khartoum, Sudan

- Built: 1993
- Operated: 1996
- Location: Khartoum, Sudan
- Coordinates: 15°29′55″N 32°30′52″E
- Industry: Military
- Products: Ammunition, Explosives, Rockets, Tanks, Armoured vehicles
- Owners: part of the Military Industry Corporation, owned by General Intelligence Service

Yarmouk Military Industrial Complex (YIC; Arabic: مجمع اليرموك للصناعات العسكرية), also known as the Yarmouk Munitions Factory (Arabic: مصنع اليرموك للذخائر), is a military complex located in Khartoum, the capital of Sudan.

== History ==
The complex was established in 1993 and inaugurated in 1996 with the aim of establishing advanced military industries to meet defence needs in Sudan and contribute to the transfer and localisation of modern technology and benefit from it in the field of defence. It produces rifles, pistols, launcher cannons and tanks such as Al Basheer MBT (Type 85M-II), Al Zubair 1 MBT, and Al Zubair 2 MBT, as well as Amir IFV and Amir 2 IFV armoured vehicles and self-propelled guns, as well as ammunition of various kinds.

It was managed by the General Intelligence Service, as part of the Military Industry Corporation, and it 35% owned by Iran. Personnel from the Iranian Revolutionary Guard Corps were also reported to be working there. In 2012, it was suggested that the Israeli Air Force conducted an air strike on the facility. During the 2023 Sudan conflict, the Rapid Support Forces claimed control of the complex.

=== 2012 Israeli airstrike ===
On 23 October 2012 at midnight local time (21:00 GMT) there was an explosion at the factory. The factory had been built in 1996. According to Khartoum State Governor Abdel Rahman Al-Khidir, the explosion probably happened at the main storage facility. The resulting fire resulted in the death of two people and one person being injured.

Ahmed Bilal Osman, Sudanese culture and information minister, blamed the explosion on an airstrike by four Israeli aircraft. He claimed that unexploded Israeli rockets had been recovered. Analysts had said that Sudan was being used as an arms-smuggling route to the Gaza Strip, which is governed by the Islamist militant organization Hamas.

According to the Sunday Times, the Israeli operation "was seen as a dry run for a forthcoming attack on Iran’s nuclear facilities."

Analysis by military experts at the Satellite Sentinel Project suggested that the target may have been a batch of around 40 shipping containers, containing highly volatile cargo.

==== Reaction to the explosion ====
- Sudan Daffa-Alla Elhag Ali Osman, Sudanese ambassador to the United Nations, brought the case to the UN Security Council. He also claimed that Israel had violated Sudanese air space three times in recent years. Three hundred people chanted outside of a government building "Death to Israel" and "Remove Israel from the map." Osman further said that Sudan has a "right to react" and to strike Israel.
- Israel Amos Gilad, an Israeli defence official, said that "Sudan is a dangerous terrorist state" but refused to confirm Israeli involvement.
- Iran sent two warships to Sudan, where the fleet commanders met with Sudanese navy commanders.

=== Sudanese civil war ===
During the Sudanese civil war and the further Battle of Khartoum the Rapid Support Forces (RSF) and the Sudanese Armed Forces (SAF), on 7 June, a fuel-storage facility located close to an army base and the factory caught fire during heavy fighting. On the same day the RSF claimed control of the complex. On 14 June, the SAF claimed that the RSF had begun using drones, which were believed to have come from the factory. On 17 June, 17 people, including five children, were killed in an SAF air strike on the factory.

The airstrike occurred earlier in the day of June 17, before the three-day ceasefire was set to be implemented later that evening. While the initial perpetrator was unknown, doctors' committees in Khartoum later accused SAF of the airstrike. A local medical group called The Emergency Room announced that seventeen people were killed in the airstrike, including five children. This toll was corroborated by the Sudanese Ministry of Health, who also stated eleven others were wounded. Twenty-five houses were also flattened in the attack, which targeted the El Ezba market south of Yarmouk. The RSF alleged the SAF of being behind the airstrike, but this couldn't be verified. The Southern Khartoum Emergency Room, referring to the airstrike as the "Yarmouk massacre," stated that the airstrike targeted RSF militants in the Yarmouk neighbourhood.

Later, the death toll grew to over 30 people killed, according to the Sudanese Doctors' Union.

Following the airstrike, the three-day ceasefire from renewed negotiations in the Treaty of Jeddah went into effect.

== See also ==
- Al-Shifa pharmaceutical factory — a pharmaceutical factory in Khartoum that was destroyed by a US cruise missile in 1998
- 2009 Sudan airstrikes — two alleged Israeli airstrikes in Sudan in 2009
