= Santorio =

Santorio is an Italian surname that may refer to

- Francesco Antonio Santorio (died 1589), Roman Catholic prelate
- Giovanni Antonio Santorio (died 1628), Roman Catholic prelate
- Giovanni Battista Santorio (died 1592), Roman Catholic prelate
- Giulio Antonio Santorio (1532–1602), Cardinal of the Roman Catholic Church
- Santorio Santorio (1561–1636), Italian physiologist and physician

== See also ==
- Santori
- Santoro
