= Shayetet 13 =

Special operations unit of the Israeli Navy

13th Flotilla
- Shayetet 13
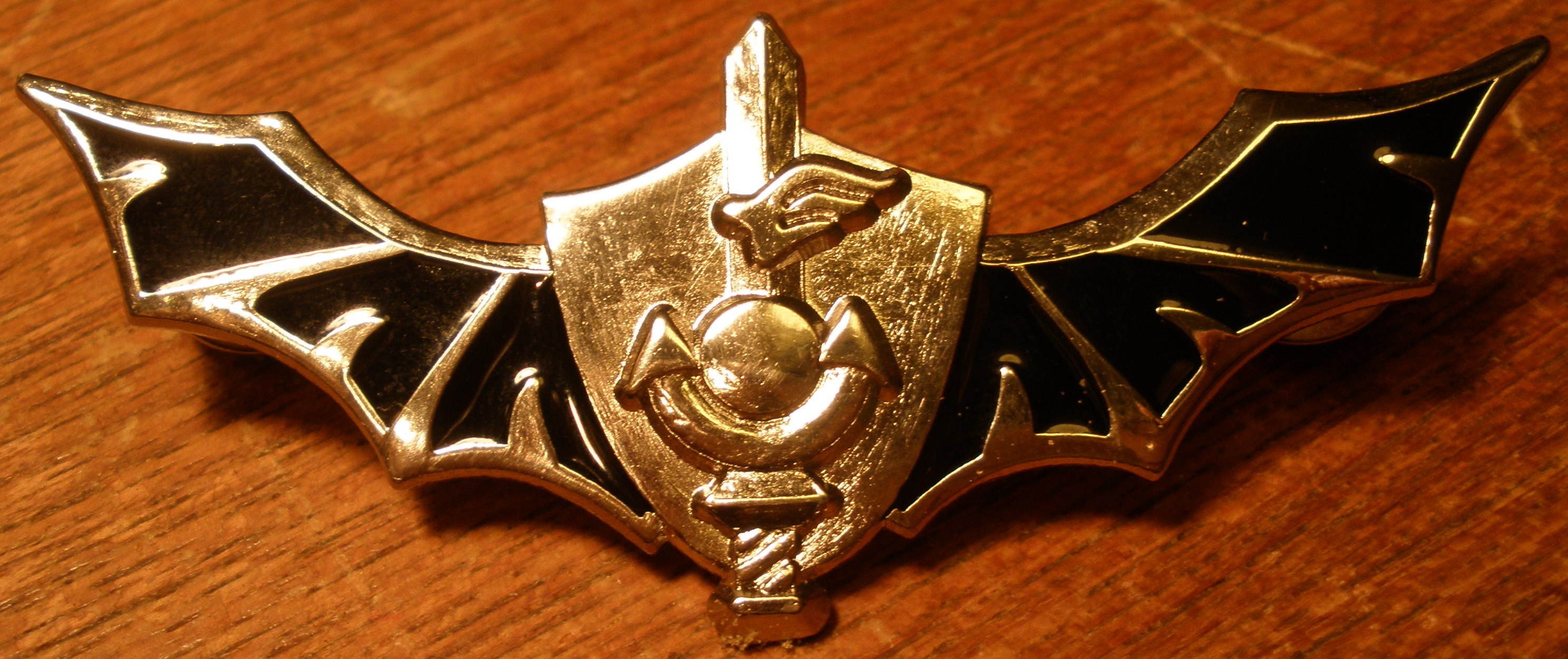
- Shayetet 13 insignia
- Active: 1948–present
- Country: Israel
- Branch: Israeli Navy
- Type: Maritime Sayeret; Special Operation Force
- Role: Special Operations; Counter-terrorism; Sabotage; Special Reconnaissance; Visit, board, search, and seizure (VBSS)
- Size: 3 companies
- Part of: Israeli Navy
- Garrison/HQ: Atlit naval base
- Nicknames: השייטת (HaShayetet, The Flotilla)
- Mottos: As the bat emerges from the darkness, As the blade cuts through with silence, As the grenade smashes in rage
- Engagements: Suez Crisis; Six-Day War; War of Attrition; Operation Spring of Youth; Operation Litani; 1982 Lebanon War; South Lebanon conflict Operation Moses; First Intifada; Second Intifada; Santorini; Noah's Ark; Abu Hasan; 2006 Lebanon War; Gaza War; Francop Affair; Gaza flotilla raid Iron Law; Operation Full Disclosure; Operation Protective Edge; Gaza war 2024 Israeli invasion of Syria; Twelve-Day War

Commanders
- Notable commanders: Ami Ayalon; Ze'ev Almog; Yoav Galant

Insignia
- Shoulder Tag

Shayetet 13 (Hebrew: שייטת 13, lit. 'Flotilla 13') is a naval commando unit of the Israeli Navy and one of the primary reconnaissance units of the Israel Defense Forces. It specializes in sea-to-land incursions, counter-terrorism, sabotage, maritime intelligence gathering, maritime hostage rescue, and boarding. The unit is trained for sea, air and land actions.

The unit is one of the most secretive in the Israeli military. The details of many missions and identities of active operatives are kept highly classified. The unit is respected as among the best of the world's special forces, and is compared to the US Navy SEALs and Britain's Special Boat Service. Unlike many other Israeli Special Forces Units which take men only for their 36-month mandatory service, volunteers for Shayetet 13 must agree to serve at least four and a half years.

== History ==
=== Founding ===
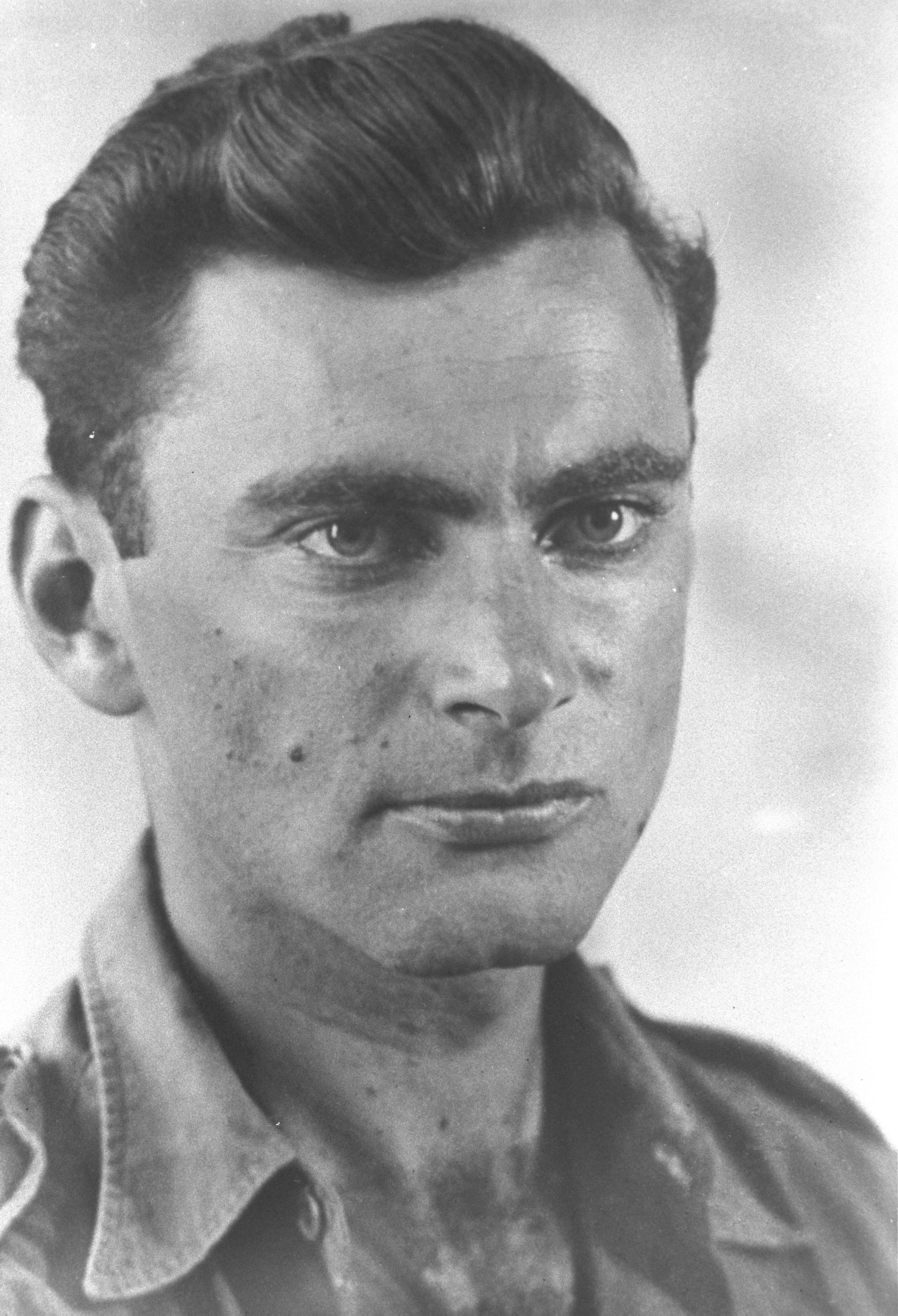
Yohai Ben-Nun, Hero of Israel, founder of the Shayetet 13, and sixth commander of the Israeli Navy

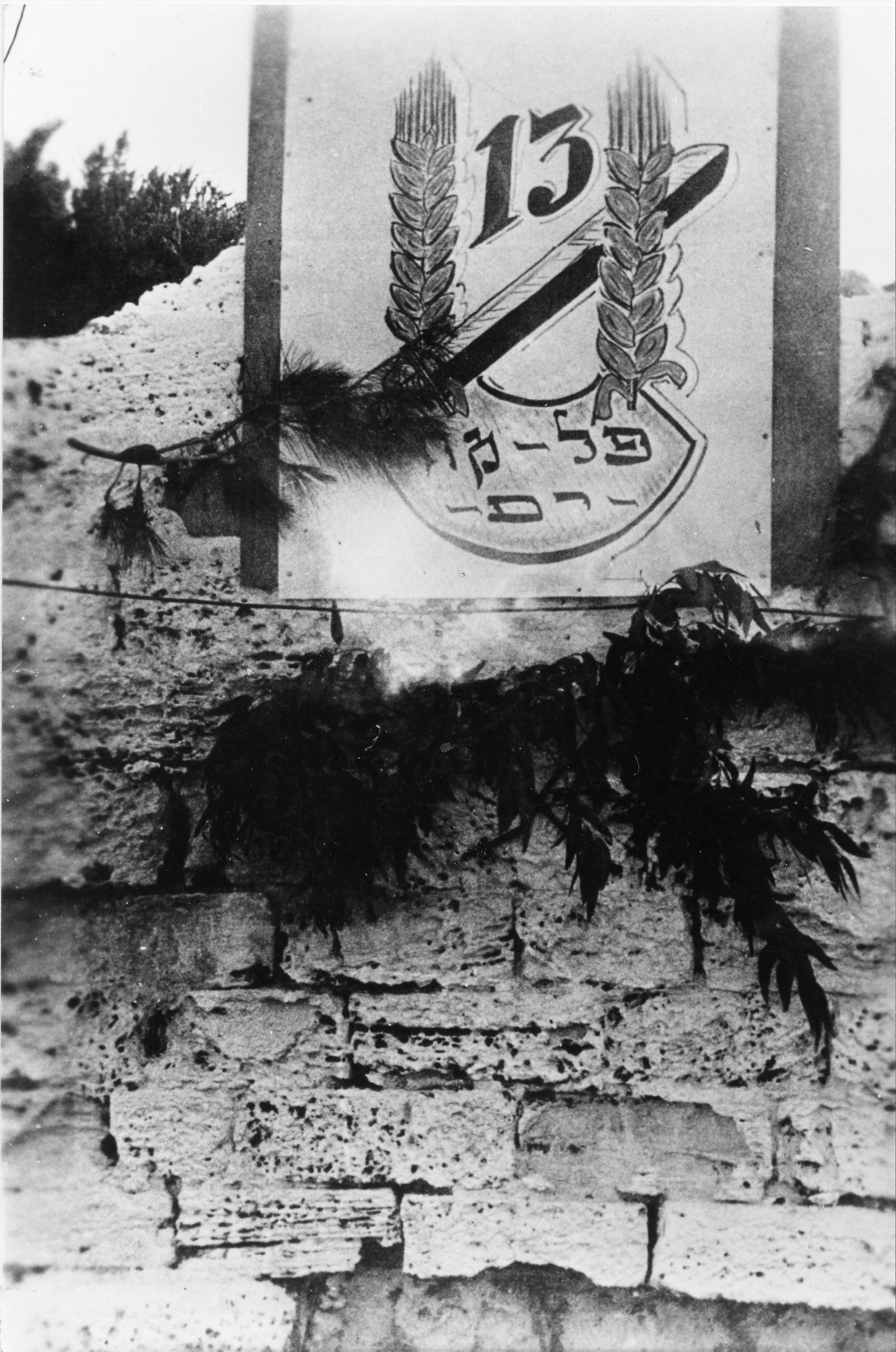
Shayetet 13 with the symbol of the Palmach in the former Palyam base in Caesarea, 1948

Shayetet 13 is a veteran Israeli special forces unit. It was formed in 1949 by Yohai Ben-Nun with men drawn from the ranks of the Palyam, the naval branch of the Palmach, the elite fighting force of the Haganah, the ancestor of the Israel Defense Forces. The need for such a dedicated unit was a matter of debate during the early years of the IDF, and the unit subsequently suffered size and budget restrictions. Upon its foundation, the existence of Shayetet 13 was a state secret, and its members wore general Israeli Navy insignia rather than their own unique one.

=== Early years ===
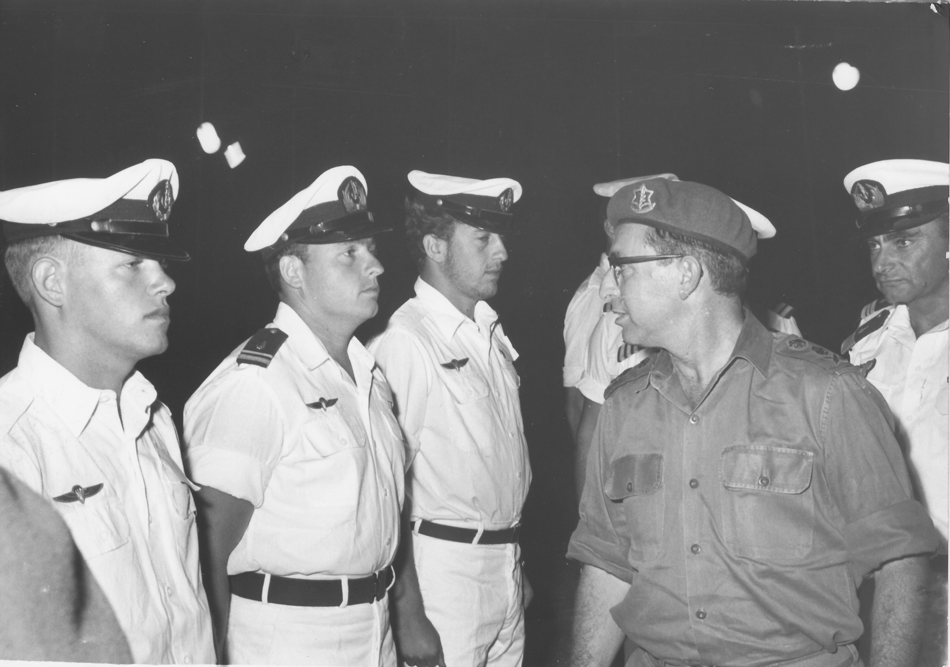
IDF Chief of Staff Tzvi Tzur inspects graduates of the Shayetet 13 training course, 1963

Shayetet 13 commandos participated in the 1956 Suez Crisis. They performed several failed reconnaissance missions before the war and later participated in the land campaign as regular soldiers. A plan for Shayetet 13 commandos to capture an Egyptian Navy frigate was almost put into action. The plan was called off because the elite unit's soldiers were deemed too valuable to risk for low-priority targets.

In 1957, Shayetet 13 began to jointly train with the French Marine Commandos, and as a result, information about its existence began to leak. Two years later, the unit's soldiers were permitted to wear their distinctive bat insignia, and the existence of the unit was made public the year after that.

In the late 1950s, Shayetet 13 commandos carried out a series of reconnaissance missions to monitor the deliveries of Soviet gunboats to Syria and monitor Lebanon during the 1958 Lebanon crisis. On July 9, 1958, Shayetet 13 operatives infiltrated Beirut harbor in Operation Yovel. They were spotted and had to retreat, swimming back out to sea where an Israeli Navy torpedo boat picked them up and exchanged fire with a Lebanese patrol craft that intervened. The Israelis were able to retreat without any casualties. In 1962, it participated in a joint operation with the Golani Brigade against Syrian positions in the Golan Heights in retaliation for Syrian firing on Israeli fishermen. While the Golani force was successful, the Shayetet 13 force failed to complete its mission, a raid on a Syrian post in Kursi, and retreated without casualties after coming under fire. The fiasco became known as "Operation Rabbit".

In August 1966, the unit was given the mission of retrieving the wreckage of a Syrian Air Force MiG that had been shot down and crashed into the Sea of Galilee. Near the end of the operation, Syrian troops opened fire, and the salvage rope attached to the aircraft was dropped. The Syrians were later able to pick it up and drag their aircraft to safety.

=== Six-Day War ===
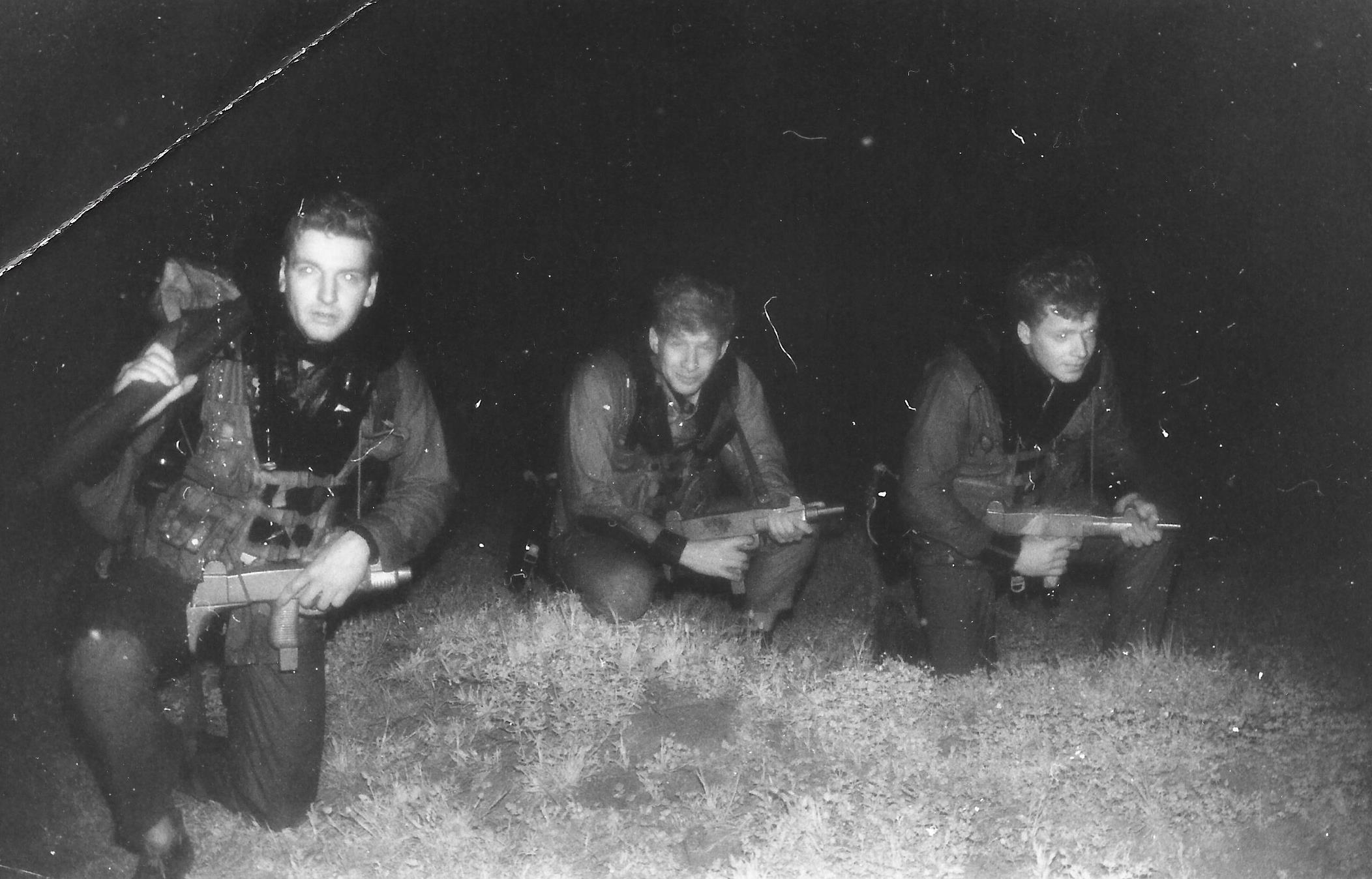
Shayetet 13 operators in the Suez Canal area, July 1967

During the 1967 Six-Day War, the unit was tasked with neutralizing enemy fleets. Shayetet 13 commandos infiltrated Port Said, but found no ships there, and during a raid into Alexandria, six divers were captured and taken prisoner, and released in January 1968. Several other missions also failed.

In July 1967, Shayetet 13 commandos crossed the Suez Canal and blew up an Egyptian rail line in two places. The operation was carried out in retaliation for Egyptian shelling.

Operation Barak was an Israeli naval mission to fly the flag in the Suez Canal carried out in July 1967, following Egyptian artillery attacks and firing on Israeli ships in the Suez Canal. Shayetet 13 participated in the operation. The operation was carried out in daylight, and the Egyptians opened fire from their positions, sinking a boat.

=== War of Attrition ===
Shayetet 13 saw extensive action in the War of Attrition. It carried out repeated commando raids in the Suez Canal area, often assisting Sayeret Matkal. Throughout 1969 the unit carried out a series of land-based mining, maritime patrol, and sabotage missions. On the night of June 21, 1969, Shayetet 13 carried out Operation Frenzy 5. After a preliminary reconnaissance mission by a Shayetet 13 team a month before, a force of commandos attacked an Egyptian guard post after landing from the sea, killing 32 Egyptian soldiers and blowing up five buildings, with the only Israeli casualties being two commandos slightly injured.

In July 1969, the unit successfully carried out the Green Island raid in cooperation with Sayeret Matkal. Three of the six Israeli soldiers killed during the operation were Shayetet 13 operatives. The Egyptians lost approximately 80 soldiers. On September 7, 1969, Shayetet 13 carried out Operation Escort, raiding the Egyptian anchorage at Ras Sadat and destroying a pair of Egyptian P-183 torpedo-boats. Three commandos were killed on the way back from the mission when one of their charges detonated. Escort, nevertheless, allowed the IDF to carry out Operation Raviv, a highly successful 10-hour raid on Egypt's Red Sea coast.

During the 1970s, the unit underwent a reorganization, with more emphasis placed on sea-to-land incursions and on effective training. More issues rose with other IDF Special Forces units, which at the time suggested that Shayetet 13 should only provide the transportation to the target and assistance in crossing water obstacles, while leaving the surface warfare to the other IDF Special Forces units.

==== Operation Blanket ====
In 1970, in response to the persecution of Syrian Jews and their efforts to flee to Israel, the Israeli government launched Operation Blanket to bring them to Israel. In an operation directed by the Mossad lasting a few years, Shayetet 13 commandos and Mossad agents made dozens of clandestine incursions into Syria, with the participants having to resort to living undercover in Damascus. The operation succeeded in bringing only a few dozen young Jews to Israel.

==== Operation Wrath of God ====
Shayetet 13 took part in Operation Spring of Youth in 1973, in which Israeli special forces raided Beirut and killed several members of Black September, the terrorist group which carried out the Munich massacre of Israeli athletes in the Munich 1972 Summer Olympics. The Shayetet 13 force that participated in the operation landed in north Beirut and destroyed a small Fatah explosives workshop.

=== Yom Kippur War ===
During the Yom Kippur War, Shayetet 13 commandos infiltrated Egyptian ports numerous times, sinking five Egyptian naval vessels and heavily damaging another. Two commandos went missing during one of the raids.

=== Lebanon ===
Operation Bardas 20 took place on January 14, 1971, to neutralize a guerrilla base in Lebanon, near Sidon, where about two dozen militants were training as frogmen. During the operation, the commandos destroyed some of the camp's buildings, and a number of guerrillas were wounded, including commander Abu Youssef.

Shayetet 13, Unit 707, and Sayeret Tzanhanim commandos jointly raided guerrilla bases in Nahr al-Bared and Beddawi on February 19, 1973, in Operation Bardas 54–55. During the operation, about 40 guerrillas were killed and 60 wounded, and a Turkish military trainer was taken prisoner.

In the years following the Yom Kippur War, Shayetet 13 carried out various missions against guerrilla boats and those who assisted them, with mediocre success. During Operation Litani in 1978, Shayetet 13 carried out ambushes, killing a senior enemy commander in one of them. From 1979 to 1981, the unit carried out 22 successful raids against guerrilla targets in Lebanon. The successes resulted in a unit decoration. In one notable raid on April 19, 1980, Shayetet 13 commandos raided the base of a guerrilla organization that according to intelligence was planning an attack on a community in Israel, killing about 15 guerrillas, including the commander of the would-be infiltration unit and two of its members, and two structures were destroyed. Several commandos were wounded.

During the 1982 Lebanon War, Shayetet 13 commandos participated in securing a beachhead for an Israeli amphibious landing north of Sidon. Two teams of commandos landed, one of which swam to the mouth of the Awali River and another which came ashore on the landing beach in rubber dinghies. The commandos engaged in a brief battle with armed Palestinians and enabled Israeli armor and infantry to land. The unit also carried out three raids on PLO targets in Beirut, and carried out several other raids and ambushes during the war. Shayetet 13 was also responsible for stopping ships that were ferrying weapons out of the country to Italy, including Yasser Arafat's personal boat.

From the early 1980s the unit became increasingly involved in the Lebanon conflict, demonstrating an excellent track record of dozens of successful operations each year and inflicting heavy losses on Hezbollah in terms of casualties and equipment destroyed.

Typical missions at the time were interdiction of guerrilla vessels, blowing up enemy headquarters and key facilities, conducting ambushes and planting explosives on guerrilla routes.

On November 25, 1988, the unit, along with other forces, conducted a raid on the Headquarters of PFLP-GC, with the aim of killing its leader Ahmad Jibril. However, the raid failed and an officer was killed and several Israeli commandos were wounded. Jibril arranged a press conference at the base, brandishing the personal weapon of the killed IDF officer. The IDF estimated that 20 guerrillas were killed in the raid, although the Palestinians only conceded eight. Israeli military analyst Ronen Bergman described the operation as an "embarrassing flop".

==== Ansariya Ambush ====
On September 5, 1997, the unit suffered a major blow during a raid in Lebanon. A force of 16 Shayetet 13 commandos landed on Lebanon's coast, south of Sidon between the towns of Loubieh and Ansariya. Speculation about their mission was that they were trying to assassinate a senior Shia Muslim cleric of the Hezbollah movement. They landed in the dark early hours of that Friday and started moving inland. The IDF said the force had been "on its way to its mission" when it was ambushed. Hezbollah and Amal commandos were lying in wait for them. The clash took place outside a 15-km deep security zone which Israel occupied in south Lebanon. The soldiers were ambushed after entering an orchard booby-trapped with bombs, which exploded as they entered. The commandos were knocked to the ground and came under heavy fire, killing the force's commander, Lt. Col. Yossi Korakin almost immediately. More commandos were killed when the firing triggered the explosives one of the commandos was carrying. Israel immediately dispatched a rescue team in a CH-53 helicopter. A rescue force of helicopters and missile boats arrived, joining in a battle that lasted until dawn as the rescuers evacuated the dead. Mortar shells exploded nearby, killing a doctor in the rescue force, and shrapnel hit the CH-53, but it was able to take off. Twelve IDF soldiers were killed, including 11 Shayetet 13 commandos. Two Hezbollah fighters were lightly wounded.

The uncollected remains of the Israeli soldiers were returned to Israel on June 25, 1998, in a prisoner exchange deal. After 14 years, Hezbollah revealed that they knew the position of the commandos in advance thanks to the interception of video footage broadcast by Israeli UAVs that were hovering over the area in the days before the mission.

=== Operation Moses ===
During the mid-1980s, Shayetet 13 played an active part in Operation Moses, which brought thousands of Ethiopian Jews to Israel. After the Mossad had established a diving resort on the Sudanese coast to serve a conduit for Jews fleeing Ethiopia, Shayetet 13 operatives would arrive on dinghies at night to ferry the refugees to an Israel Navy boat waiting offshore.

=== Tunisia 1988 ===
On April 16, 1988, Shayetet 13 commandos, along with Sayeret Matkal and Mossad operatives, took part in the assassination of Khalil al-Wazir at his home in Tunisia.

=== Second Intifada ===
During the Second Intifada, Shayetet 13 commandos took part in ground counter terror operations deep within the West Bank and the Gaza Strip. Shayetet 13 participated in hundreds of operations against Hamas, Islamic Jihad and the Al-Aqsa Martyrs' Brigades, killing dozens of militants and arresting hundreds. Shayetet 13 snipers were responsible for the assassination of Thabet Thabet, a senior Fatah political official in Tulkarm. The unit also participated in the Battle of Jenin, during which a Shayetet 13 force extracted an Israeli reserve army unit which was pinned down after having been ambushed and recovered the bodies of soldiers who had been killed in the ambush. It earned high acclaim due to the successful capture of three Palestinian vessels which attempted to smuggle in weapons: Karine A, Santorini, Abu Hasan, and Abu-Yusuf. The Karine A incident, in particular was considered a highly difficult operation. In 2004, the unit's operations were temporarily suspended following a complaint from B'Tselem, an Israeli human rights group, that Shayetet 13 operatives had shot an unarmed Palestinian fighter in Jenin for no reason. An investigation found that the commandos had good reason to assume the guerrilla was concealing a grenade, and the unit was put back into action.

In 2002 and again in 2003, Shayetet 13 won the Chief-of-Staff citation for successful counter terrorism operations.

=== 2006 Lebanon War ===
On August 5, 2006, during the 2006 Lebanon War, Shayetet 13 commandos carried out the Tyre raid. The commandos raided an apartment block in Tyre which was allegedly housing Hezbollah commanders. According to Israeli sources, between 6 and 10 Hezbollah fighters were killed. Lebanese sources claimed that one or two Hezbollah fighters, a Lebanese soldier, and at least four civilians were killed in the operation. Ten commandos were wounded in the raid, two of them severely. The IDF admitted that the senior Hezbollah commanders who had been the primary target of the raid had managed to escape.

=== Syria 2008 ===
According to the Sunday Times, Shayetet 13 snipers on a yacht were responsible for the assassination of Syrian General Muhammad Suleiman.

=== Operation Cast Lead ===
During Operation Cast Lead, which lasted from December 2008 to January 2009, Shayetet 13 commandos landed on the Gaza Strip coastline to strike Hamas targets on land. They were also reportedly involved in two Israeli airstrikes in Sudan against Iranian-supplied arms being smuggled into the Gaza Strip. The strikes hit a 17-truck convoy carrying arms, and an Iranian arms ship docking in Sudan.

=== Francop Affair ===
On 4 November 2009, the Antiguan-flagged vessel MV Francop which had been carrying arms and munitions from Iran to Hezbollah was successfully boarded and taken over by Shayetet 13 commandos. The commandos subsequently found the well-hidden weapons.

=== Gaza flotilla operation ===
On May 31, 2010, Shayetet 13 took part in Operation Sea Breeze or Operation Sky Winds against a flotilla trying to break the blockade of Gaza. The commandos, armed with non-lethal weaponry and 9mm pistols as sidearms, roped down from helicopters and boarded from speedboats, and apprehended five ships with mostly passive resistance. Aboard the MV Mavi Marmara, the commandos were attacked by dozens of activists armed with knives, iron bars, slingshots and improvised weapons, and allegedly with firearms, including those seized from commandos. Three soldiers were captured, carried below deck, and were temporarily held in a passenger hall. The commandos initially used non-lethal force, but after this proved ineffective, they opened fire with live ammunition and seized control of the ship. Nine activists were killed, and several dozen were wounded. Seven commandos were also wounded, two of them seriously. International condemnation of Shayetet 13's actions followed. Subsequently, Shayetet 13 commandos boarded and seized the aid ship MV Rachel Corrie with no resistance.

=== Victoria Affair ===
On March 15, 2011, Shayetet 13 took part in "Operation Iron Law," conducted on the high seas against the Liberian-flagged, German-owned Victoria, a cargo vessel found to be carrying 50 tons of weapons which intelligence reports indicated had been consigned to Hamas. The Victoria was interdicted approximately 200 nautical miles from the Israeli coast, as it traveled from Turkey to El-Arish port in Egypt (other sources give the destination as Alexandria, Egypt). According to the Israel Defense Forces, Victoria loaded the cargo in the port of Latakia in Syria and sailed to Mersin, Turkey. The ship was intercepted by Israeli Navy Sa'ar 5-class corvettes and boarded by commandos from Shayetet 13, without resistance. The IDF has stated that the ship's crew was unaware it was carrying weapons, as they were concealed in 39 of the 100 containers on deck beneath bags of Syrian lentils and cotton. When seized by Shayetet 13, Victoria was redirected to the Port of Ashdod. There, further inspections were conducted and the contraband was unloaded. Israel then announced it would release the ship and allow Victoria to continue to the Egyptian port of Alexandria.

=== Operation Protective Edge ===
During the 2014 Gaza War, code-named Operation Protective Edge, Shayetet 13 carried out numerous missions against rocket-launching positions. On July 13, Shayetet 13 commandos raided a compound from which long-range rockets were being fired with the support of helicopters and warships, killing three Hamas fighters while four of the commandos were lightly injured.

=== Operation Full Disclosure ===
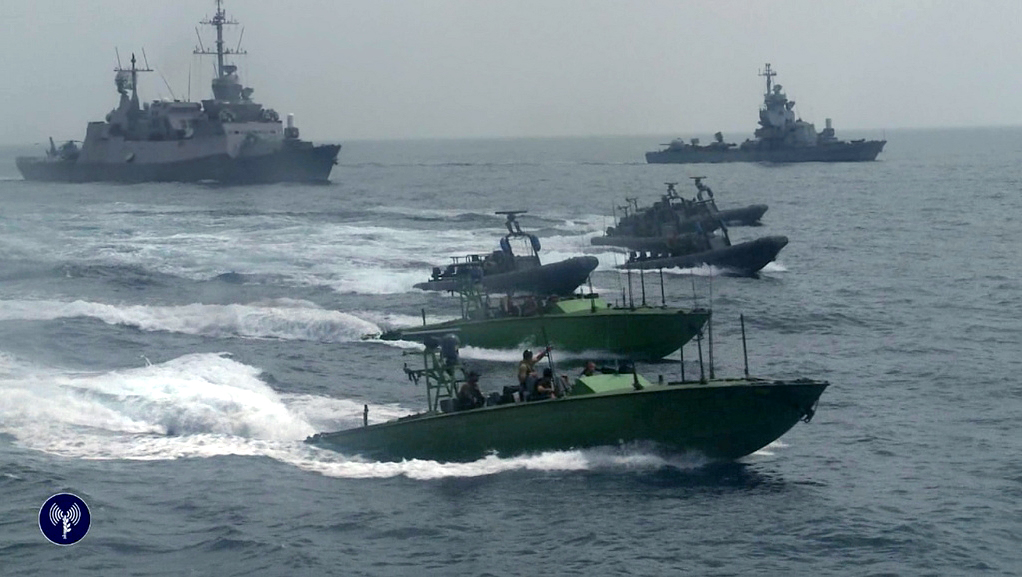
Operation Full Disclosure task force, with speedboats carrying Shayetet 13 commandos in the foreground

On March 5, 2014, Shayetet 13 commandos raided the ship Klos C, an Iranian ship heading for Port Sudan from Iraq with weapons believed to have been destined for militant groups.

=== Persian Gulf crisis ===
During the 2019–2021 Persian Gulf crisis, Shayetet 13 commandos carried out attacks which damaged numerous Iranian cargo ships carrying oil and weapons to Syria from late 2019 to 2021 with limpet mines and other weapons. Some of the attacks took place in the Red Sea. The unit is also believed to have been behind an attack on the MV Saviz, believed to be an Iranian intelligence ship of the Islamic Revolutionary Guard Corps Navy, which was heavily damaged by a limpet mine in April 2021.

=== Israel-Gaza war ===
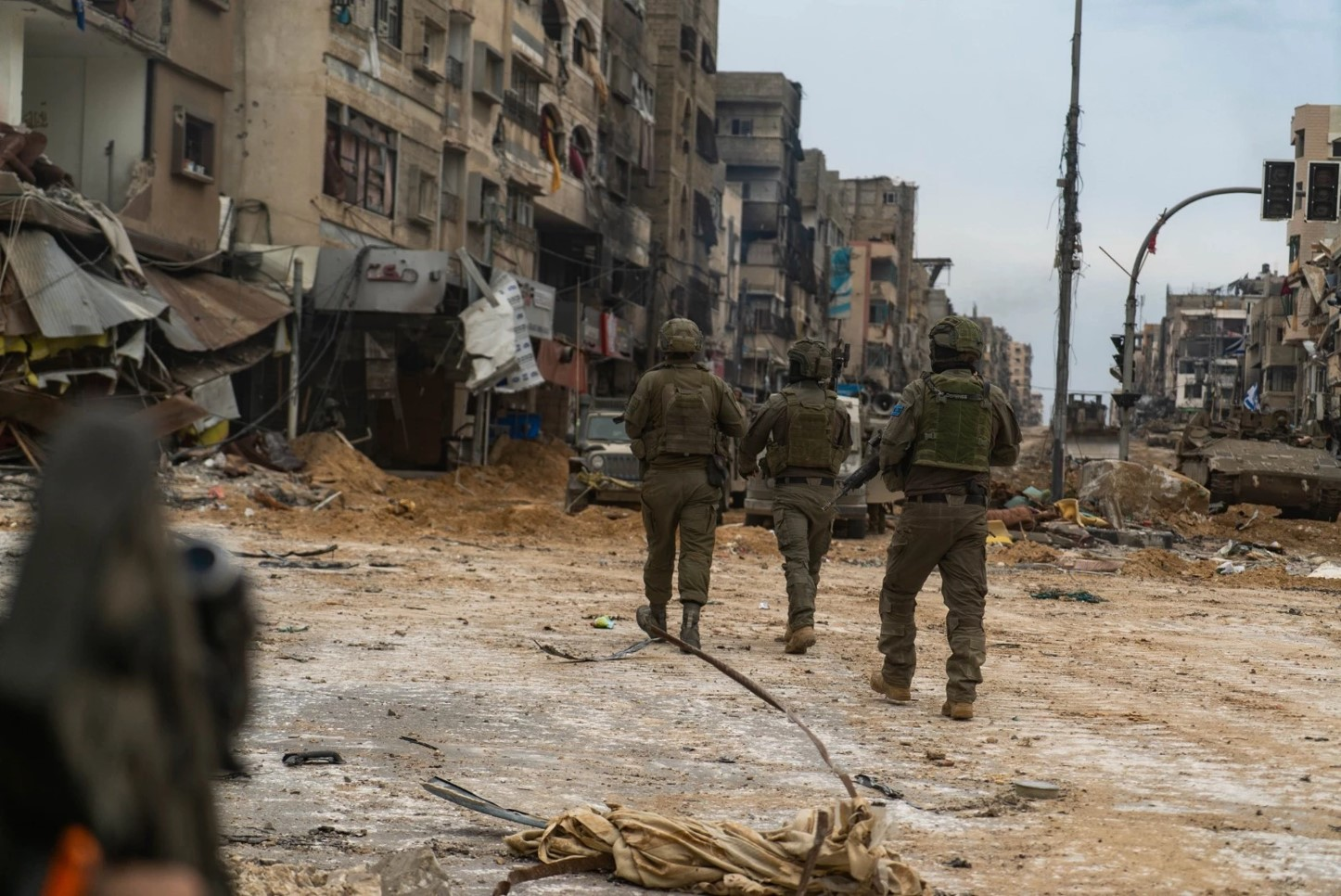
Shayetet 13 commandos during the Gaza War

Shayetet 13 has had an extensive role in the Gaza war. During the October 7 attacks, the unit participated in the fighting to recapture areas in southern Israel overrun by Hamas. A force of Shayetet 13 commandos retook the Sufa military outpost as part of the Battle of Sufa, and the unit's commandos also took part in fighting in Be'eri, Kfar Aza, Sa'ad, Mefalsim, and Nir Oz. During the fighting in southern Israel, Shayetet 13 commandos killed more than 60 enemy fighters and rescued about 250 hostages. Shayetet 13 commandos captured Muhammad Abu Ghali, the deputy commander of the southern division of Hamas' naval force, during the fighting.

Shortly before the main Israeli ground invasion of the Gaza Strip began, Shayetet 13 commandos carried out a seaborne raid against military infrastructure used by Hamas' Nukhba naval commando force. Shayetet 13 commandos took part in the Israeli invasion of the Gaza Strip. In November 2023, Shayetet 13 commandos backed by tanks of the 188th Armored Brigade, combat engineers, and air support took over the Gaza harbor, which was used as a training base for Hamas naval commandos, in an operation in which 10 militants were killed. In December 2023, Shayetet 13 and the 401st Brigade raided a series of schools in Gaza City's Sheikh Radwan neighborhood, uncovering hundreds of weapons, as well as killing several militants and capturing dozens. During the Battle of Jabalia, Shayetet 13 commandos along with soldiers of the 551st Reserve Brigade raided Hamas' general security headquarters in Jabalia.

=== Other operations ===
In 1985, a Shayetet 13 raid sank a PLO boat in Algeria. In 2012, Shayetet 13 commandos seized a Liberian-flagged German cargo ship on suspicion that it was carrying weapons, but no weaponry was found. That same year, numerous members of Shayetet 13 were awarded citations for covert operations in enemy territory after the unit had carried out a series of operations which resulted in "many successes" according to the IDF. In 2013, it was reported that Shayetet 13 commandos had installed espionage equipment on an island close to the Syrian city of Tartus which enabled Israel to monitor the Russian naval presence there.

Many of Shayetet 13's missions are classified, though some known or suspected activities of the unit have been revealed by other means. In one example, Zeev Almog, the former commander of the unit, remarked that during his time, 23 ships were raided and 7 sunk by the unit, without elaborating. Retired Israeli Navy Colonel Mike Eldar said that "Israel can arrange an operation where it sends a team from Shayetet 13 to attach a mine to a ship, which can even be done at the port of destination or any other way station. The [commandos] can easily swim to the ship undetected, and many such operations have been carried out over the years against terrorists or states."

== Organization ==
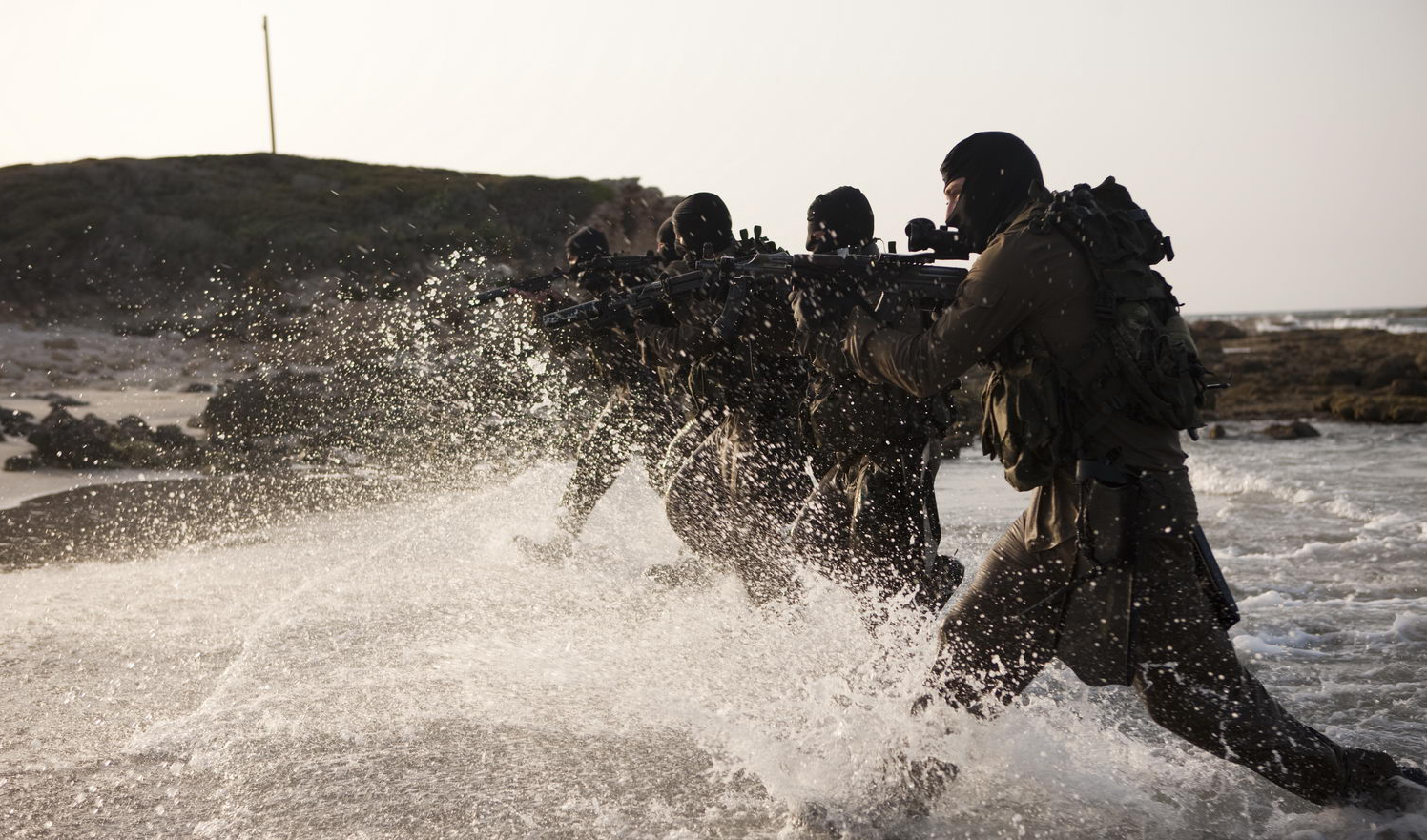
Shayetet 13 operatives during training

Shayetet 13 has an estimated 300 personnel divided into three specialized company-sized units (Hebrew: Pluga), these include:

- Haposhtim (raiders) unit – is the primary unit of Shayetet 13. Their missions include special reconnaissance and direct-action missions on land, maritime counter-terrorism and hostage rescues.
- Underwater unit – the offensive divers unit. Its missions range from underwater attacks and sabotage, to hydrographic reconnaissance, beachhead reconnaissance and security. Not to be confused with the defensive divers YALTAM unit.
- Above water unit – is similar to an American Special Boat Team and specializes in surface attacks, sea transportation of units to and from target areas.

The unit is headquartered at Atlit naval base.

== Training ==
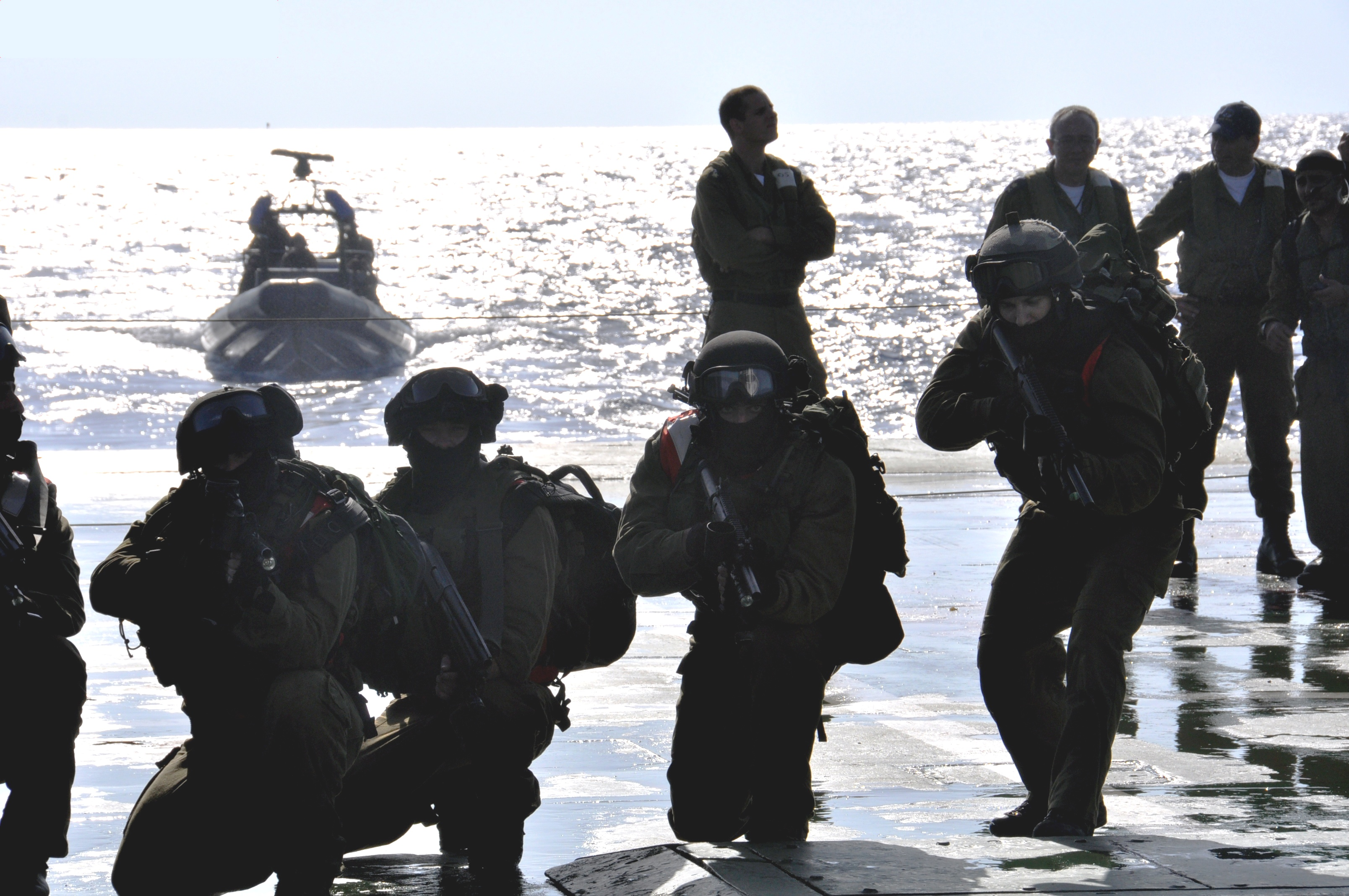
Shayetet 13 commandos prepare for an exercise aboard a warship

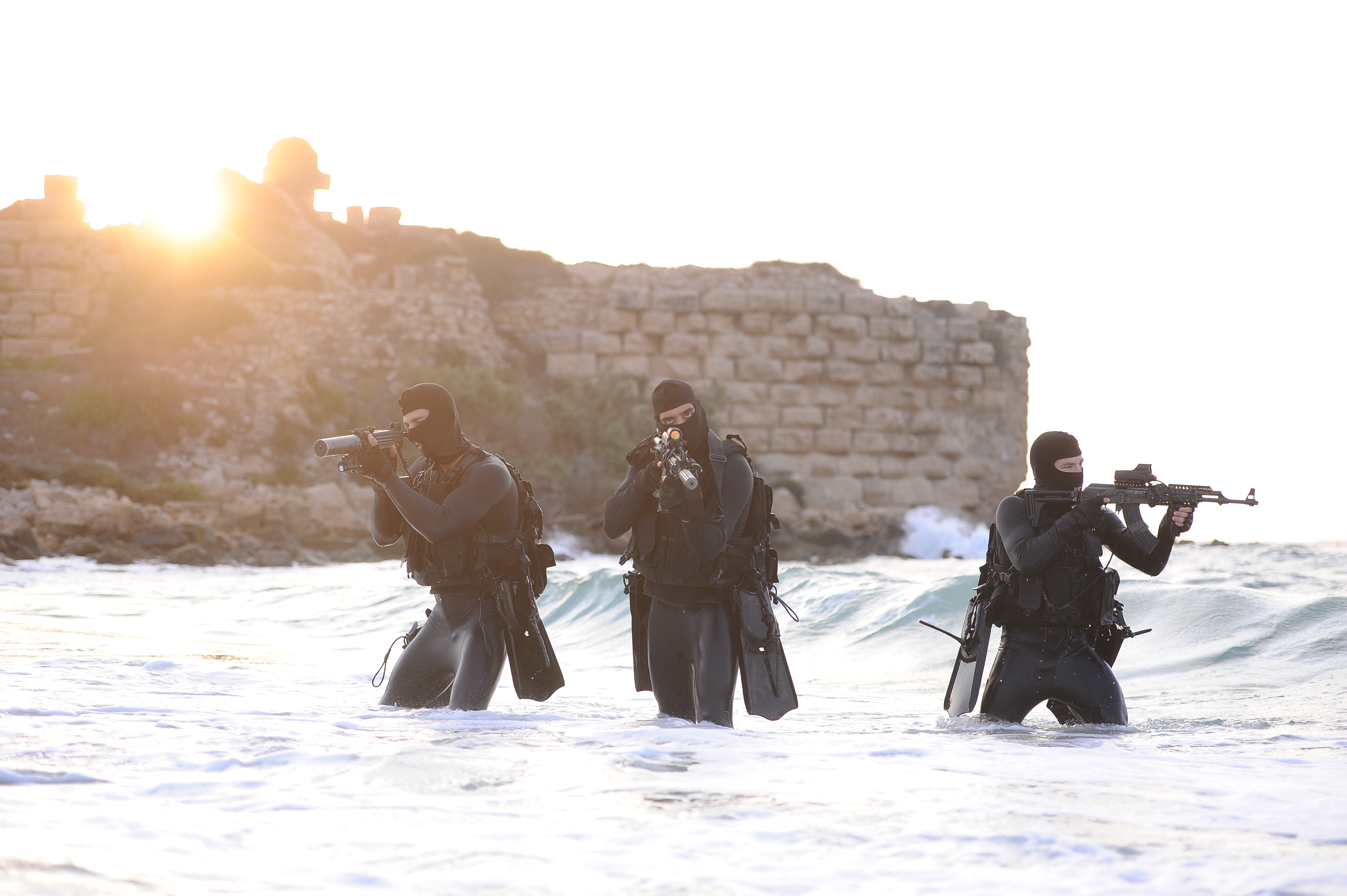
Shayetet 13 commandos in training

The training of Shayetet 13 recruits lasts 20 months, and is considered one of the toughest courses in the IDF. Shayetet 13 operates a summer course for teenagers about to enter military service considering joining the unit, who have the opportunity to get a taste of training in diving, raids, navigation, boats, and more. Those who enlist in Shayetet 13 are put through a five-stage training process:

- Selection process. A selection camp to recruit for the unit is held twice a year. All recruits must have a medical profile of 97. All combatants must be male. Cadets undergo extensive medical tests, after which they are put through a series of physically and mentally grueling exercises for four days. Doctors and psychologists are at hand to prevent burnout and physical injury. This phase stresses psychological toughness, and tests recruits in their ability to take and operate under stress and fear. Few succeed in passing this phase.
- Six months of basic and advanced infantry training with the Nahal Brigade.
- Preparation phase: this phase lasts for three months and consists of advanced infantry and weapons training, parachute training, basic elements of maritime warfare, operation of small vessels, long swims, forced marches, and demolitions.
- Four weeks of advanced training in combat diving. During this course, cadets learn the basics of combat diving, and how to cope with situations such as cold, darkness, clouded water, and how to survive high-risk underwater situations.
- Dedicated phase. This is the most rigorous phase of training which lasts about a year, and most of the dropouts leave during this phase. This phase includes training in advanced diving techniques with close-circuit systems, underwater demolition, sea-to-land incursions via diving, ships, submarines, and parachuting into the sea. The unit's snipers also undergo six weeks of sniper training, divided into three weeks of long-range sniper training at the IDF Sniper School, and three weeks of short-range sniper training for hostage situations at the IDF Counter-Terror School. Cadets then train in maritime counter-terrorism operations, such as the boarding of vessels, oil rigs and near-coast buildings. During this phase, soldiers are divided between the three specialized units based on their capabilities and personal interests, and train on their future specialty.

During their training, cadets are trained in a variety of martial arts, among them Krav Maga, a hand-to-hand combat system which is Israel's national martial art.

Toward the end of their training, Shayetet 13 recruits go through a course in enduring enemy captivity which recruits from other special forces units and pilot cadets must also go through. Following a surprise mock kidnapping, they are held in prison-like conditions for two weeks, during which they subjected to threats, interrogation, and physical violence, and are forced to perform humiliating activities.

Even after their induction into active service, Shayetet 13 commandos continue to take part in training exercises, and participate in cross-training with foreign special forces units such as the US Navy SEALs and other regional partners such as the Underwater Demolition Team (MYK).

== Equipment ==
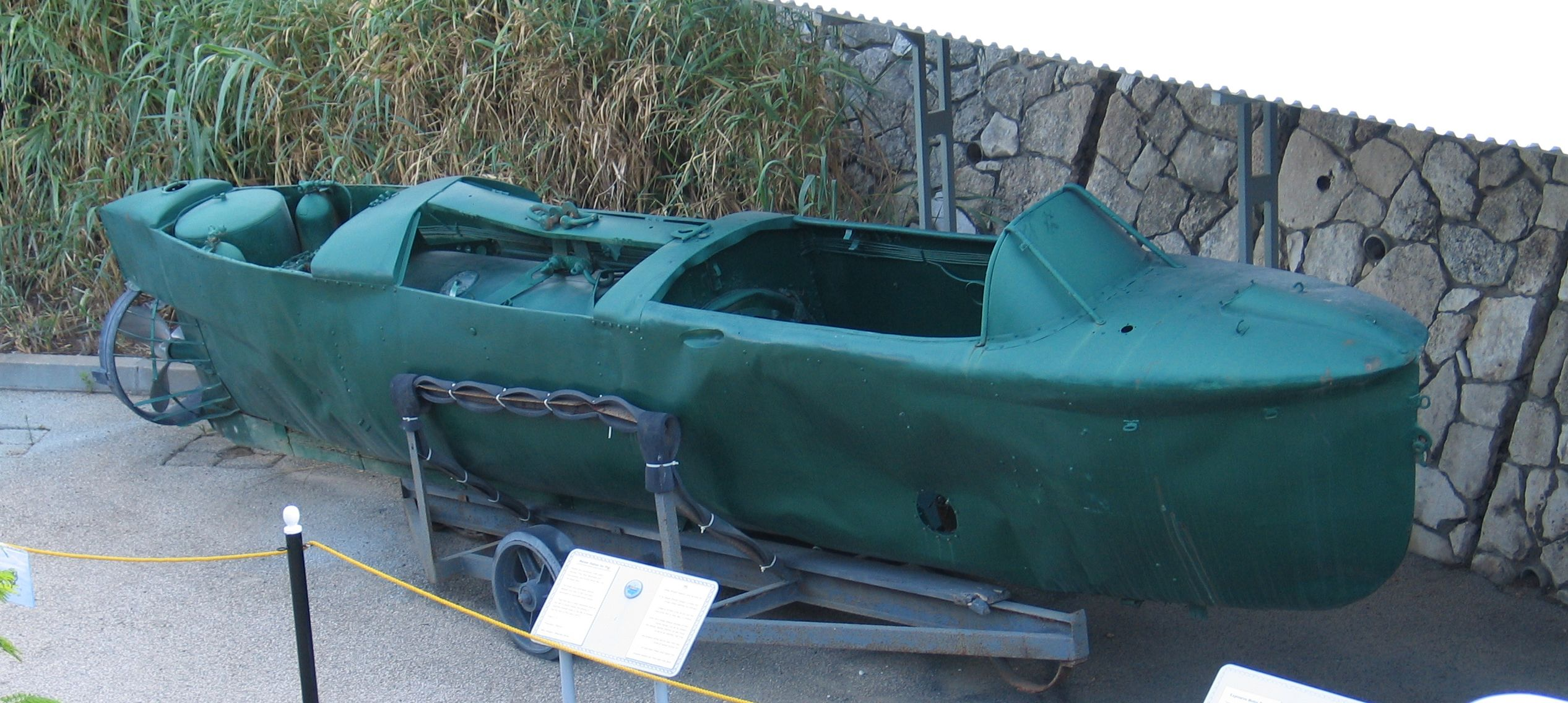
Israel Navy Gang (pig) SDV BIR-55 by the Italian CABI Cattaneo firm

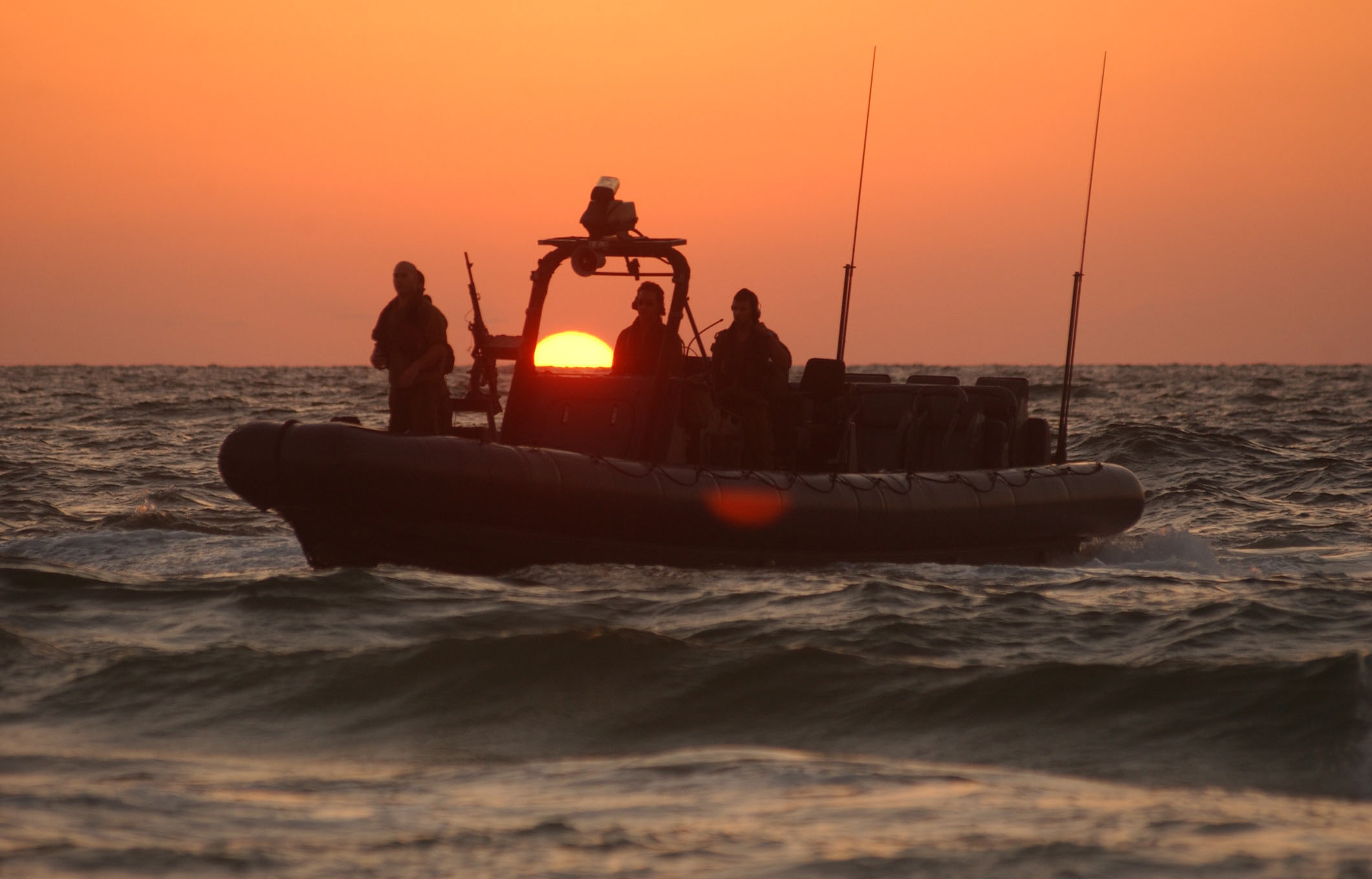
A Morena-class rigid-hulled inflatable boat

=== Weaponry ===
- M4 carbine
- AK-47
- M203 grenade launcher
- CTAR-21 carbine
- X95 carbine
- Uzi 9mm Sub-machine gun
- Negev machine gun
- SR-25 sniper rifle
- M24 sniper rifle
- Glock pistols

=== Other equipment ===
- Limpet mines
- Zodiac RHIB boats
- Morena RHIB boats
- Snunit fast attack craft

== Toxic exposure ==
In 2000, the Israeli newspaper Yedioth Ahronoth reported that Shayetet 13 veterans had an unusually high occurrence of cancer and other serious illnesses compared to the general population. The IDF subsequently launched a commission of inquiry. It was suspected that the cause was due to soldiers training in the heavily polluted Kishon River, which until the early 1990s was used by the unit for swimming and diving exercises. At the same time petrochemical facilities in Haifa were regularly dumping toxic chemicals into the river. The commission of inquiry failed to reach a firm conclusion and stated that it did not find statistical evidence that diving in the Kishon River caused cancer. A compromise was subsequently reached in which some of the soldiers were recognized as having contracted illnesses due to their military service while others were not. Over the following years, veterans who were not recognized as well as civilian fishermen who worked in and around the river repeatedly filed unsuccessful lawsuits against the government and the companies responsible for the pollution.

In December 2021, Israeli defense minister Benny Gantz ordered a new investigation of the matter. The probe found that pollution had indeed been responsible for the high rates of illness, concluding that the soldiers' exposure to toxic chemicals in the Kishon River was so extreme as to be "incomparable to any other case like it." As a result, the Israeli Defense Ministry decided to recognize every veteran who had trained in the Kishon River and subsequently contracted an illness, regardless of type, as a disabled veteran.
