= Giuseppe Santoro (diplomat) =

Italian diplomat

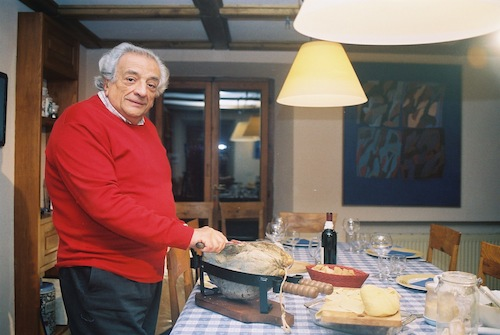

Giuseppe Santoro (born 1930) is an Italian former diplomat who was also active in politics as a supporter of the Socialists. He was head of Italy's mission to Cuba and was drawn into corruption investigations in the 1990s.

== Background ==
Giuseppe Santoro was born in Ceglie Messapica, Apulia, in 1930. His father, Mario Santoro, was a lawyer whose family had come originally from Naples but had moved to Rome during the second half of the 19th century. His grandfather and great-grandfather had been high-ranking officers in the Italian army. His mother's family was from the region of Apulia, where they were lawyers and also olive oil producers, and hence Santoro's birth there. His son is artist Mario Santoro - Woith

Santoro attended school and university in Rome and gained his degree in law at the Sapienza University of Rome, receiving the highest distinction.

== Political career ==
Santoro started in the diplomatic service in 1958 and served in the Italian Government until 1997. At the Italian Foreign Ministry he was Mission Head in Cuba, headed the cooperation for development section from 1990 to 1991, and later served as director for third-world aid. He was eventually appointed Ambassador to the U.N. Food and Agriculture Organization. Shortly thereafter, on 25 March 1993, he was arrested on charges of complicity in bribery and abuse of office, as part of a wider corruption inquiry.

Santoro held the office of International Cooperation Institute of the Italian Socialist Party. He was one of the main supporters of the President of the Socialist Party, Riccardo Lombardi. He was a member of the Central Committee of the Socialist Party from 1975 until its dissolution during the nineties.

== Academic career ==
Santoro was appointed as representative of the Foreign Affairs Minister at the University for Foreigners Perugia. During these years, he organized a study program for the Master's in International Politics for foreign students. These students came from different countries, such as the Mediterranean area and Afghanistan. He also taught International Politics on the faculty of International Communications and International Relations.
