= Santorini affair =

2001 Palestinian weapons-smuggling incident

- Part of the Second Intifada
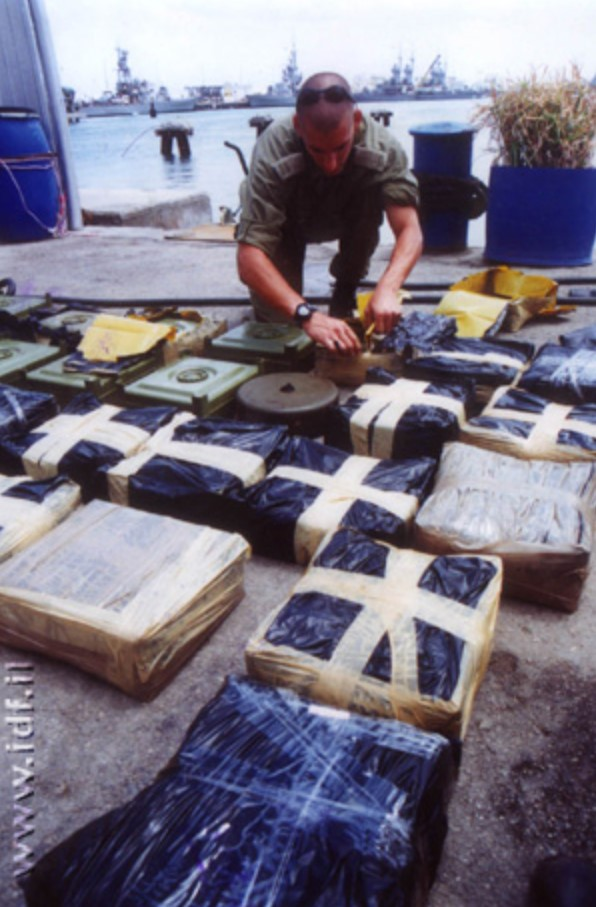
- Planned by: Israeli Sea Corps
- Objective: Seize weapon-smuggling boat Santorini
- Date: May 2001
- Executed by: Shayetet 13
- Outcome: Success

Santorini was a fishing boat used for weapons-smuggling, which was captured in May 2001 by the Israeli Shayetet 13 Naval Commando Unit. This was the first ship caught in an attempt to smuggle weapons to Palestinian-controlled territories. In May 2002, three of Santorini's crew members were convicted of attempting to smuggle weapons into the Gaza Strip.

== Operation ==
The ship's crew was led by Captain Div Va'iza, a Lebanese citizen, and included two of his relatives, Hussein Va'iza and Fahdi Awadwas. The three were professional smugglers; a fourth crewmember was Va’iza's son. The crew had been hired by Ahmed Jibril's Popular Front for the Liberation of Palestine – General Command and were asked to smuggle arms into Gaza. The crew refused the operation as too risky, but agreed instead to smuggle the arms to a location near the Egyptian Sinai coast, where they would be met by agents of the PFLP-GC. The crew made three failed attempts to rendezvous with the agents in Sinai and were captured on their fourth.

Santorini had left northern Beirut On May 6, 2001, carrying weapons packed in barrels. Their plan was to drop the barrels offshore, anchored at a predetermined spot for later collection by Sinai-based agents. A surveillance plane spotted the suspicious ship, and a Shayetet 13 commando team boarded the 40-ton ship near Rosh Hanikra, just off the coast of northern Israel's border with Lebanon.

== Shipment ==
According to the IDF, the shipment contained the following weapons:

- 50 Katyusha rocket launchers
- Four Strela 2 (SA-7) antiaircraft missiles
- 120 RKG anti-tank grenades
- 20 rocket-propelled grenade launchers
- Two 60 mm mortars
- 98 60 mm mortar rounds
- 62 TMA-5 land mines
- Eight TMA-3 anti-tank land mines
- 24 hand grenades
- 30 Kalashnikov rifles
- 116 gun cartridges for the rifles
- 13,000 7.62 mm Kalashnikov bullets

== Reactions ==
- Popular Front for the Liberation of Palestine – General Command: the PFLP-GC confirmed the shipment was theirs, with Jibril quoted on Israel's Army radio as saying "This was not the first shipment, nor will it be the last."
- Israel: Prime Minister Sharon said the event was "a very dangerous development" which "emphasises the intentions of the [Palestinian] authority." He described it as an extremely grave violation of all the agreements that Arafat signed with Israel.
- Palestinian Authority – Palestinian Information Minister Yasser Abed Rabbo denied any connection to the smuggling attempt, and the PA's spokesman, Nabil Abu Rudaineh was quoted saying "For sure we have nothing to do with the shipment."

== Aftermath ==
In May 2002, three of Santorini's crewmembers were convicted, by a military tribunal, of attempting to smuggle weapons into Gaza. The key legal issues were whether the weapons were destined for Gaza (over which the court had jurisdiction, as it was then occupied by Israel), and whether the crew knew that Gaza was to be the final destination of the shipment. The fourth crewmember, Va’iza's son, was acquitted when the court determined he had not participated in the previous three attempts and that it was not proven that he knew the ship's destination.
