= MV Francop =

German-owned merchant cargo ship

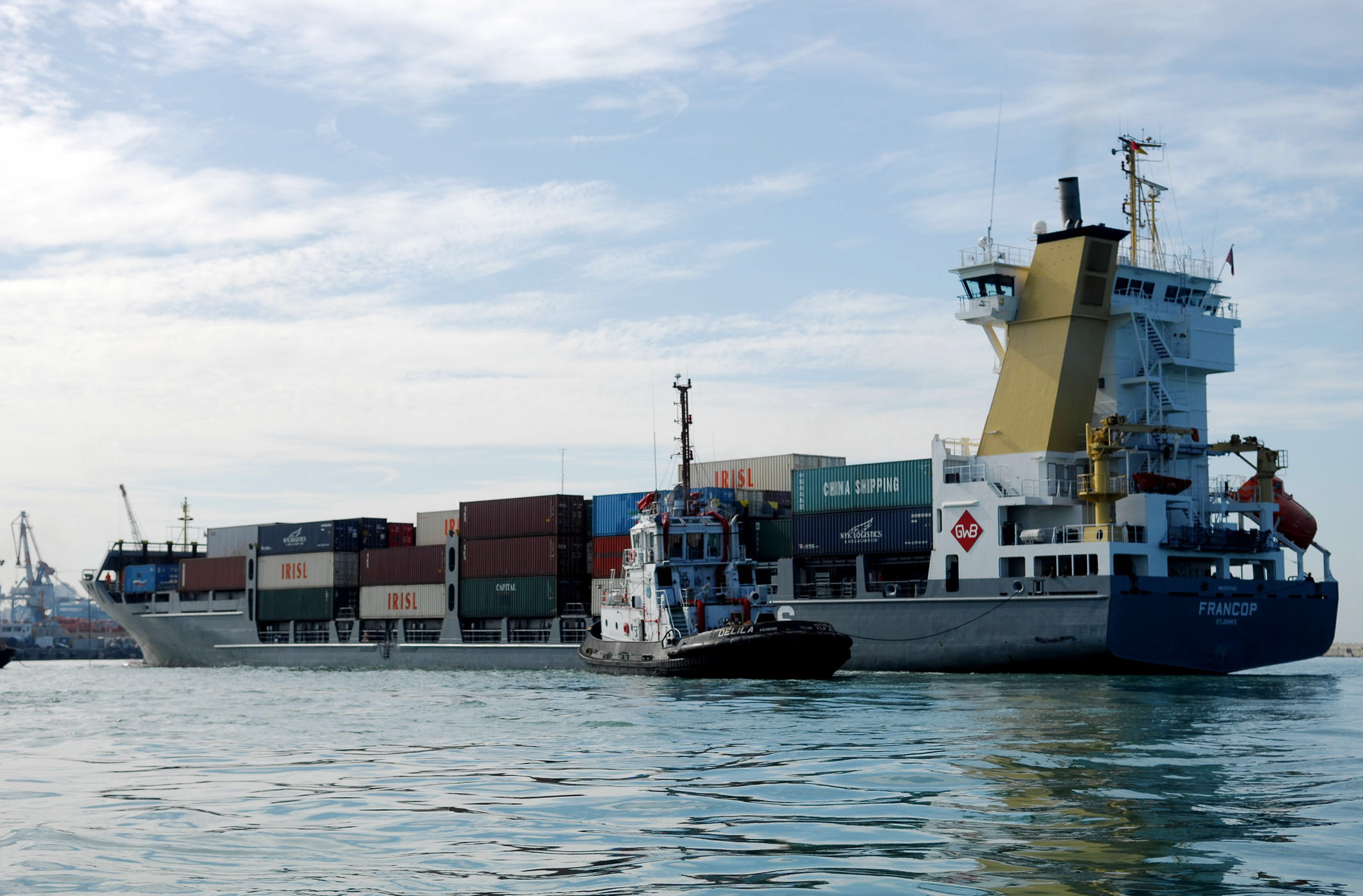
- IDF soldiers boarding the Francop cargo ship

History
- Name: Tavastland (2002–06); Francop (2006-19); Fesco Moneron (Since 2019)
- Namesake: Häme (Tavastland); Francop; Fesco Transport Group and Moneron Island
- Owner: Francop Schiffahrts GmbH & Co. (2002-19)
- Operator: United Feeder Services
- Port of registry: Germany (2002–03); United Kingdom (2003–06); Antigua and Barbuda (2006-19); Russia (since 2019)
- Builder: Sietas, Neuenfelde
- Yard number: 1166
- Completed: August 2003
- Identification: IMO number: 9277412; MMSI number: 305234000; Callsign: V2DJ5
- Status: In service

General characteristics
- Length: 137.50 m (451 ft 1 in)
- Beam: 21.30 m (69 ft 11 in)
- Draught: 7.47 m (24 ft 6 in)
- Propulsion: 1 MaK 9M43 diesel engine, 8,400 kilowatts (11,300 hp)
- Speed: 18.5 knots (34.3 km/h)
- Crew: 11

The MV Francop is a German-owned, Antigua and Barbuda-flagged merchant cargo ship. In November 2009 the Israeli navy boarded the vessel in the Mediterranean Sea, suspecting that it was carrying weapons destined for Hezbollah from the Islamic Republic of Iran in violation of United Nations Security Council Resolution 1701. Hundreds of tons of weapons were found on the ship, which was then directed to berth in Israel.

== Background ==
Built by Sietas of Neuenfelde and completed in August 2003, the ship was launched as Tavastland. It measures 137.50 metres (451 ft 1 in) long, with a beam of 21.30 metres (69 ft 11 in) and a draught of 7.47 metres (24 ft 6 in). Its MaK 9 M 43 diesel engine can reach a speed of 18.5 knots (34.3 km/h). The ship has sailed under the German, British and Antigua and Barbuda flags and is currently under the flag of Russia. It is currently owned by the Russian company Far Eastern Shipping Co., Vladivostok.

== Boarding incident ==
On 4 November 2009, in an operation named Operation Four Species, Israeli navy commandos of Shayetet 13 boarded the ship in the eastern Mediterranean Sea without resistance, acting on intelligence reports which it had received. The ship was about 160 kilometres (86 nmi) off the coast of Israel, near Cyprus. A spokesperson for the Israel Defense Forces (IDF) said the ship was carrying "dozens of shipping containers, carrying numerous weapons, disguised as civilian cargo among hundreds of other containers on board". The IDF also claimed that the weapons originated from Iran and were to be directed to Hezbollah. The navy said that the crew was not aware of the purported smuggling and cooperated with Israeli commandos. After the boarding, the Israeli Navy directed the ship to the Israeli port of Ashdod, where a thorough inspection was held.

According to the IDF, the ship picked up the cargo in Damietta, Egypt; the cargo arrived in Egypt on a ship that sailed from Bandar-Abbas, Iran on 25 October. The ship was then set to sail to Limassol, Cyprus and then Latakia, Syria. The IDF suspects that the cargo was intended for Hezbollah, which fought Israel in the 2006 Lebanon War. Following the war, United Nations Security Council Resolution 1701 forbade the shipments of arms to Hezbollah.

An Israeli naval official claimed that the amount of weapons found is ten times more than that found during Operation Noah's Ark. The arms shipment weighed 320 tons and were held in containers marked with Iranian shipping codes. The seized weaponry included 9,000 mortar shells, thousands of 107-mm Katyusha rockets, 600 122-mm rockets, and hundreds of thousands of rounds of ammunition. The arms shipment was the largest ever seized by Israeli authorities.

On 5 November 2009, ambassadors and diplomats from 44 countries and military attaches from 27 armies in the world were invited by the IDF and the Foreign Ministry in order for them to be witnesses of the many weapons and accumulation of ammunition that were found on the Francop ship.

== See also ==
- 2006 Lebanon War
- Operation Noah's Ark
- United Nations Security Council Resolution 1701
- Annie Larsen
- Boka Star
- Chong Chon Gang
- Victoria Affair
- List of cargo ships
