= Sinking of MS Estonia =

1994 maritime disaster on Baltic Sea

Sinking of the MS Estonia
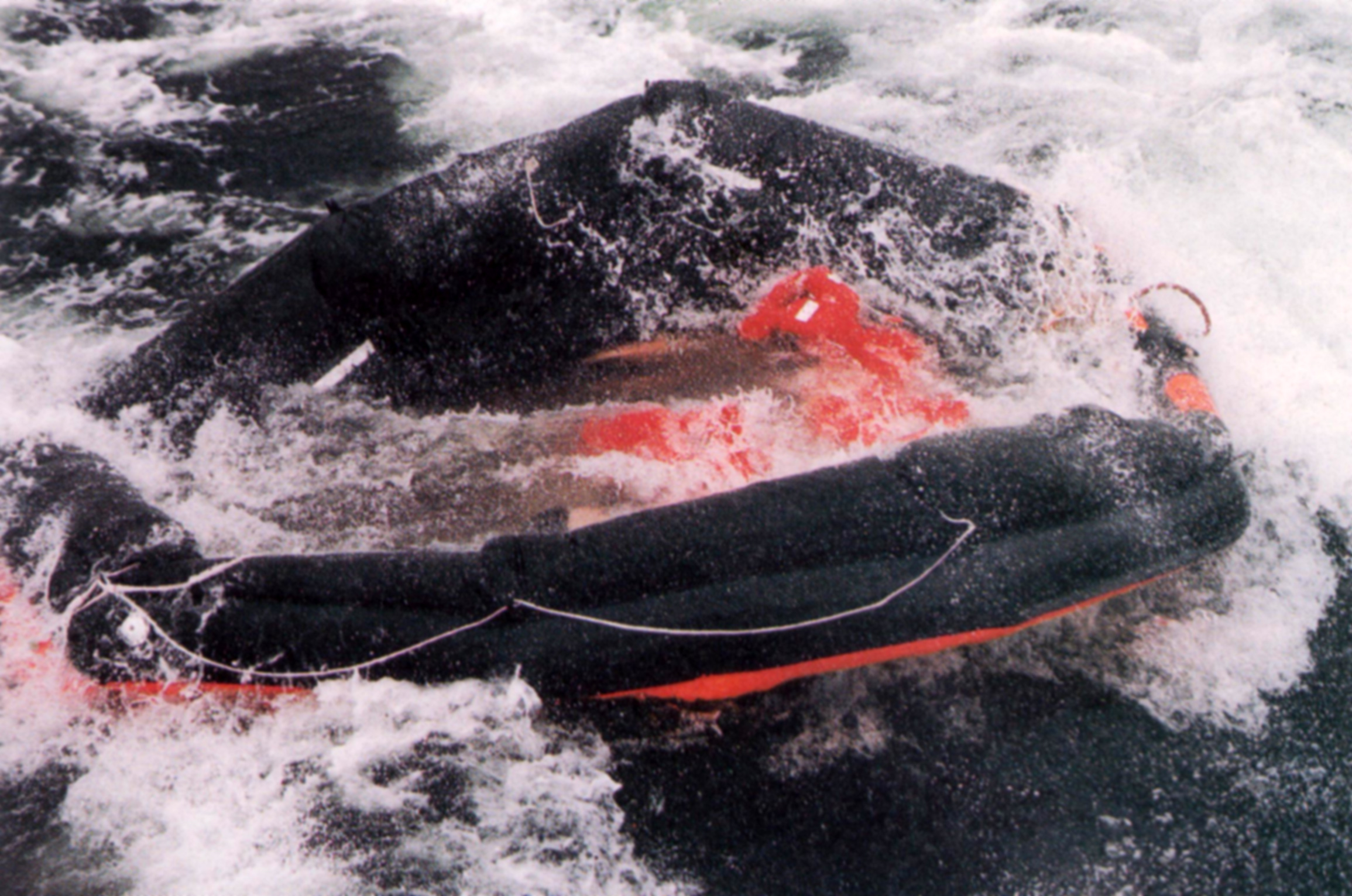
- One of Estonia's inflatable life rafts, filled with water
- Date: 28 September 1994; 32 years ago
- Time: 00:50–01:50 (UTC+2)
- Duration: 1 hour
- Location: Baltic Sea; 59°22.92′N 21°40.92′E
- Type: Maritime disaster
- Cause: Detachment of the bow visor from the vessel
- Participants: 989; 137 survivors
- Deaths: 852

MS Estonia, a cruiseferry operated by Estline, sank on Wednesday, 28 September 1994, between about 00:50 and 01:50 CEST (UTC+2) as the ship was crossing the Baltic Sea, en route from Tallinn, Estonia, to Stockholm, Sweden. The vessel was carrying 989 people, including 803 passengers and 186 crew, most of whom were Swedish and Estonian. Only 138 people were rescued, one of whom later died. Most victims succumbed to drowning or hypothermia in water around 10–11 °C (50–52 °F). In total, 852 people died, making the sinking of the MS Estonia one of the deadliest peacetime sinkings of a European ship, after Titanic in 1912 and Empress of Ireland in 1914. It remains the deadliest peacetime shipwreck to have occurred in European waters and was one of the worst maritime disasters of the 20th century.

The Estonia had been constructed in 1980. On the night of the accident, severe weather was reported in the Baltic Sea. The ship began its voyage behind schedule and was noted to have a slight starboard list from cargo distribution before leaving port. The accident began shortly after 01:00, when noises from the bow were reported. A mayday was sent at 01:22 but did not follow international formats, delaying the wider emergency response. By 01:50, the ship had capsized and disappeared from radar screens, sinking in international waters south of the Finnish island of Utö. Rescue operations were launched under the 1979 International Convention on Maritime Search and Rescue. Nearby ferries and helicopters participated, but the scale of the disaster, coupled with rough seas and the rapid loss of the ship, limited survival.

The official investigation concluded that the vessel's bow visor failed in rough seas, allowing water to flood the car deck and causing the ship to capsize rapidly. The sinking highlighted the vulnerability of roll-on/roll-off ferries to flooding, similar to the Herald of Free Enterprise incident seven years earlier. Renewed investigations in the 2000s and 2020s examined hull damage and structural flaws, while conspiracy theories have alleged cover-ups and secret military cargo, claims rejected by official inquiries. The wreck site was declared a protected grave in 1995 under an international treaty, and memorials have been erected in Tallinn and Stockholm to commemorate the victims. In its aftermath, new international safety regulations were introduced, including automatic activation of distress beacons, stricter standards for ferry design and inspection, and expanded training for passenger ship crews.

== Final voyage ==
Estonia departed slightly behind schedule at 19:15 on 27 September and was expected in Stockholm the next morning at about 09:00. She was carrying 989 people: 803 passengers and 186 crew.

Most of the passengers were Swedish, although some were of Estonian origin; most of the crew were Estonian. The ship was fully loaded, and was listing slightly to starboard because of poor cargo distribution.

According to the final disaster report, the weather was rough, with a wind of 15 to 25 metres per second (29 to 49 knots; 34 to 56 miles per hour), force 7–10 on the Beaufort scale and a significant wave height of 4 to 6 m (13 to 20 ft) compared with the highest measured significant wave height in the Baltic Sea of 7.7 m (25 ft 3 in). Esa Mäkelä, the captain of Silja Europa who was appointed on-scene commander for the subsequent rescue effort, described the weather as "normally bad", or like a typical autumn storm in the Baltic Sea. According to modelled satellite data, gusts were in the excess of 85–100 km/h (24–28 m/s) at 01:00 that night over the Baltic Sea, although the ship had not yet reached the areas with the heaviest gusts before its sinking. There was some rain and temperatures around 10 °C (50 °F). All scheduled passenger ferries were at sea, something not unusual for this weather in the Baltic Sea. The official report says that while the exact speed at the time of the accident is not known, Estonia had very regular voyage times, averaging 16 to 17 kn (30 to 31 km/h). The chief mate of the Viking Line cruiseferry Mariella tracked Estonia's speed by radar at approximately 14.2 kn (26.3 km/h) before the first signs of distress, while the Silja Europa's officers estimated her speed at 14 to 15 kn (26 to 28 km/h) at midnight.

== Sinking ==
The first sign of trouble aboard Estonia was when a metallic bang was heard, presumably caused by a heavy wave hitting the bow doors around 01:00, when the ship was on the outskirts of the Turku archipelago, but an inspection—limited to checking the indicator lights for the ramp and visor—showed no problems. Over the next 10 minutes, similar noises were reported by passengers and other crew. At about 01:15, the visor is believed to have separated and torn open the loading ramp behind it. The ship immediately took on a heavy starboard list (initially around 15 degrees, but by 01:30, the ship had rolled 60 degrees, and by 01:50, the list was 90 degrees) as water flooded into the vehicle deck. The new joint investigation by Estonian, Finnish and Swedish authorities in 2025 concluded that the separation of the visor and initial listing took place more likely right after 01:00. Estonia was turned to port and slowed before her four engines cut out completely.

At about 01:20, a quiet female voice called "Häire, häire, laeval on häire", Estonian for "Alarm, alarm, there is alarm on the ship," over the public address system, which was followed immediately by an internal alarm for the crew, then one minute later by the general emergency signal. The vessel's rapid list and the flooding prevented many people in the cabins from ascending to the boat deck, as water not only flooded the vessel via the car deck, but also through windows in cabins as well as the massive windows along deck 6. The windows gave way to the powerful waves as the ship listed and the sea reached the upper decks. Survivors reported that water flowed down from ceiling panels, stairwells and along corridors from decks that were not yet under water. This contributed to the rapid sinking. A mayday was communicated by the ship's crew at 01:22, but did not follow international formats. Estonia directed a call to Silja Europa and only after making contact with her did the radio operator utter the word "Mayday". The radio operator on Silja Europa, chief mate Teijo Seppelin, replied in English: "Estonia, are you calling mayday?" After that, the voice of third mate Andres Tammes took over on Estonia and the conversation shifted to Finnish.

Tammes was able to provide some details about their situation but, due to a loss of power, he could not give their position, which delayed rescue operations somewhat. Tammes would later die in the sinking. Some minutes later, power returned (or somebody on the bridge managed to lower themselves to the starboard side of the bridge to check the marine GPS, which will display the ship's position even in blackout conditions), and the Estonia was able to radio its position to Silja Europa and Mariella. After that, Estonia sent their last radio message saying: "Todella paha, todella pahalta näyttää nyt tässä kyllä" (in English: "Really bad, it's looking really bad right now."). The ship disappeared from the radar screens of other ships at around 01:50, and sank at 59°23′N 21°41′E in international waters, about 22 nautical miles (41 km; 25 mi) on bearing 157° from Utö island, Finland, to a depth of 40 to 45 fathoms (75 to 80 m; 240 to 270 ft) of water. According to survivor accounts, the ship sank stern first after taking a list of 90 degrees.

== Rescue effort ==
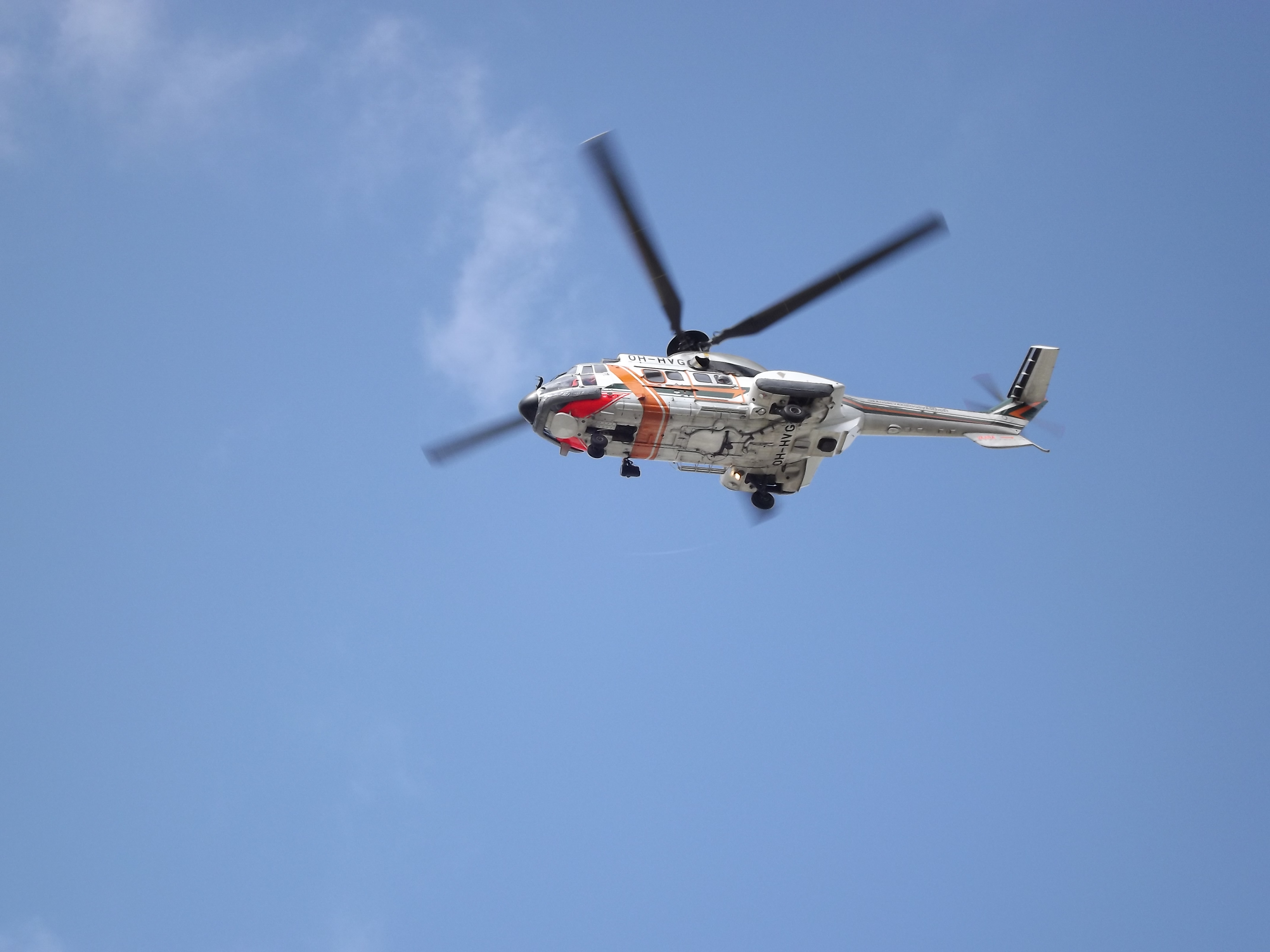
Super Puma OH-HVG of the Finnish Border Guard flying

Search and rescue followed arrangements set up under the 1979 International Convention on Maritime Search and Rescue (the SAR Convention), and the nearest Maritime Rescue Co-ordination Centre MRCC Turku coordinated the effort in accordance with Finland's plans. The Baltic is one of the world's busiest shipping areas, with 2,000 vessels at sea at any time, and these plans assumed the ship's own boats and nearby ferries would provide immediate help and that helicopters could be airborne after an hour. This scheme had worked for the relatively small number of accidents involving sinkings, particularly as most ships have few people on board.

Mariella, the first of five ferries to reach the scene of the accident, arrived at 02:12. MRCC Turku failed to acknowledge the Mayday immediately and Mariella's report was relayed by Helsinki Radio as the less urgent pan-pan message. A full-scale emergency was only declared at 02:30. Mariella winched open liferafts into the sea onto which 13 people on Estonia's rafts successfully transferred, and reported the location of other rafts to Swedish and Finnish rescue helicopters, the first of which arrived at 03:05. The former took survivors to shore, while the latter—Finnish border guard helicopters Super Puma OH-HVG and Agusta Bell 412 OH-HVD—chose the riskier option of landing on the ferries. The pilot of OH-HVG stated that landing on the ferries was the most difficult part of the whole rescue operation; despite that, this single helicopter rescued 44 people, more than all the ferries. MS Isabella saved 16 survivors with its rescue slide.

== Victims ==
Nationalities	Missing	Survivors	Identified bodies	Total
Sweden	461	51	40	552
Estonia	237	62	47	346
Latvia	19	6	4	29
Russia	10	4	1	15
Finland	9	3	1	13
Norway	6	3	0	9
Germany	4	3	1	8
Denmark	5	1	0	6
Lithuania	3	1	0	4
Morocco	2	0	0	2
Netherlands	1	1	0	2
Ukraine	1	1	0	2
United Kingdom	1	1	0	2
Belarus	1	0	0	1
Canada	1	0	0	1
France	1	0	0	1
Nigeria	1	0	0	1
Total	757	137	94	989

Of the 989 on board, 138 were rescued, one of whom died later in hospital. Ships rescued 34 and helicopters 104; the ferries played a much smaller part than the planners had intended because it was too dangerous to launch their man-overboard (MOB) boats or lifeboats. The accident claimed 852 lives. Most died by drowning and hypothermia, as the water temperature was 10–11 °C (50–52 °F).

One of the victims of the sinking was the Estonian singer Urmas Alender. In total, 94 bodies were recovered: 93 within 33 days of the accident, and the last victim was found 18 months later. By the time the rescue helicopters arrived, around a third of those who escaped from the Estonia had died of hypothermia, while fewer than half of those who had managed to leave the ship were eventually rescued. The survivors of the shipwreck were mostly young males. Of all those who survived 111 were men and 26 were women. Seven over 55 years of age survived and there were no survivors under age 12. About 650 people were still inside the ship when it sank. The commission estimated that up to 310 passengers reached the outer decks, 160 of whom boarded the life-rafts or lifeboats.

== Official investigation and report ==
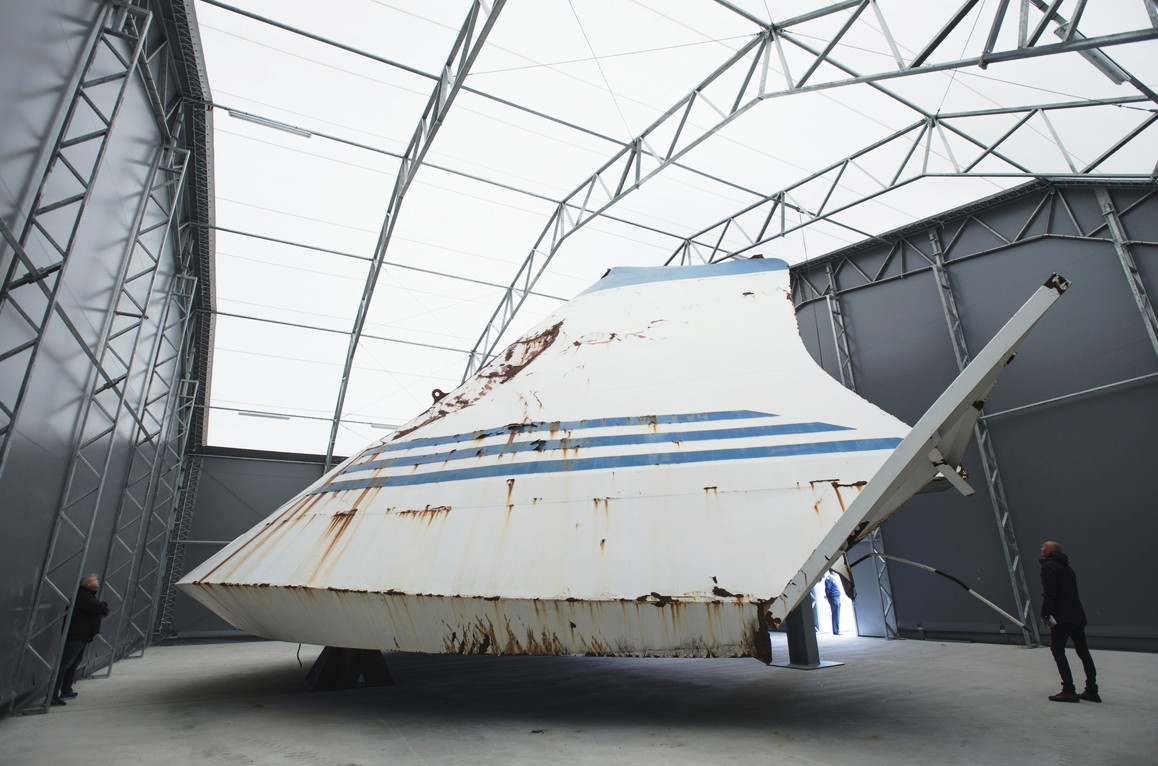
The bow visor after recovery at the Swedish naval base on Muskö Island.

The wreck was examined and videotaped by remotely operated underwater vehicles and by divers from a Norwegian company, Rockwater A/S, contracted for the investigation work. The official report indicated that the locks on the bow door had failed from the strain of the waves and the door had separated from the rest of the vessel, pulling the ramp behind it ajar. The bow visor and ramp had been torn off at points that would not trigger an "open" or "unlatched" warning on the bridge, as is the case in normal operation or failure of the latches. The bridge was also situated too far back on the ferry for the visor to be seen from there. While there was video monitoring of the inner ramp, the monitor on the bridge was not visible from the conning station. The bow visor was under-designed, as the ship's manufacturing and approval processes did not consider the visor and its attachments as critical items regarding ship safety. The first metallic bang was believed to have been the sound of the visor's lower locking mechanism failing, and that the subsequent noises would have been from the visor 'flapping' against the hull as the other locks failed, before tearing free and exposing the bow ramp. The subsequent failure of the bow ramp allowed water into the vehicle deck, which was identified as the main cause of the capsizing and sinking: RORO ferries with their wide vehicle decks are particularly vulnerable to capsizing if the vehicle deck is even slightly flooded because of free surface effect: the fluid's swirling motion across such a large area hampers the boat's ability to right itself after rolling with a wave. The same effect had caused the capsizing of Herald of Free Enterprise seven years earlier.

The report was critical of the crew's actions, particularly for failing to reduce speed before investigating the noises emanating from the bow, and for being unaware that the list was being caused by water entering the vehicle deck. There were also general criticisms of the delays in sounding the alarm, the passivity of the crew, and the lack of guidance from the bridge.

Recommendations for modifications to be applied to similar ships included separation of the condition sensors from the latch and hinge mechanisms.

=== Changes stemming from the disaster ===
In 1999, special training requirements in crowd and crisis management and human behaviour were extended to crew on all passenger ships, and amendments were made to watch-keeping standards. Estonia's distress beacons or EPIRBs required manual activation, which did not happen. Had they been activated automatically, it would have been immediately obvious that the ship was in distress and the location would have been clear. All EPIRBs were subsequently required to deploy automatically and the accident was "instrumental in the move to legislate Voyage Data Recorders". New International Maritime Organization (IMO) Safety of Life at Sea (SOLAS) liferaft regulations for rescue from listing ships in rough water were introduced.

New designs, the "citadel concept" once again influenced by Estonia, aim to ensure damaged ships have sufficient buoyancy to remain afloat, though cost will determine if any are built. SOLAS 90, which came into effect in 2010, specifies existing passenger ships' stability requirements and those in North West Europe must also be able to survive 50 cm (20 in) of water on the car deck.

=== 2020 investigation ===
On 28 September 2020, a Swedish documentary was released which used underwater equipment to film the wreck. This investigation found a 4-metre hole in the ship's hull. This prompted the Estonian prime minister and foreign minister to meet with their Swedish and Finnish equivalents and announce that a "new technical investigation" would take place.

The head of the Estonian investigation, Margus Kurm, stated publicly that he believes this new information points to a collision with a submarine and that the hole could not have happened post-sinking. In October 2020, the Estonian government published a report stating that the hole was too small to have sunk the ship as quickly as it did. The Swedish documentary makers were prosecuted for violating the sanctity of the wreck, but were acquitted on 8 February 2021 as the diving happened on a German ship in international waters. Germany had not signed the treaty that declares sanctity over the site. However, as a result of a retrial in September 2022, the filmmakers were finally found guilty and fined.

By June 2021, laws allowing the examination of the wreck for investigation of the disaster were passed in the Swedish and Estonian Parliaments. Shortly after, the Swedish Accident Investigation Authority announced their plan to conduct dives at the grave site starting in July 2021. In July 2023, the car ramp was retrieved.

=== 2023 intermediate report ===
Between 2021 and 2022, Estonian, Finnish and Swedish authorities carried out comprehensive wreck surveys using cameras, 3D photogrammetry, 3D laser scanners, and shallow- and mid-penetration sub-bottom profilers, among other equipment. This was to identify the cause of penetrating deformation(s) to the hull of MS Estonia and assess whether the safety investigation of the sinking should be re-opened.

In January 2023, the Swedish Accident Investigation Authority (SHK) released the Intermediate Report of the Preliminary Assessment of MS Estonia following the joint investigation. According to the report, there was "no indication of a collision with a vessel or a floating object", neither was there "indication of an explosion in the bow area". Also an oil leak was found on the hull's aft section and that the Finnish Border Guard is monitoring the leakage.

It was also concluded that the ship was "not seaworthy" and its certificate of seaworthiness, issued 28 January 1993, was incorrect, because

- an inspection of the bow parts following regulations, which would have led to the discovery of the flaws in the visor, was not performed, and
- the exemption regarding the location of the bow ramp as the upper extension of the collision bulkhead was not recorded in certificates.

The report also concluded that if the inspection was performed and the exemption noted, "the vessel would not have been trading the Tallinn–Stockholm route", and "the accident would probably not have occurred".

The bow ramp and some metal parts that were cut from the hull by divers in the 1990s were salvaged in July 2023.

== Effects of the disaster ==
The sinking was deeply traumatic to Sweden as the nation had no large past disasters to refer to. Ferries resumed in November. The disaster had a major impact on ferry safety, leading to changes in safety regulations as well as in life-raft design, much as the RMS Titanic disaster did in 1912.

Rolf Sörman, a Swedish passenger on the accident voyage, stated that "Sweden is so small that basically everyone knew someone who drowned." Estonian Mart Luik was quoted in an article in the Christian Science Monitor stating: "I think all Estonians of a certain age remember where they were when they heard about the Estonia." Citing such testimonials, Gordon F. Sander of the Christian Science Monitor stated that the disaster "struck across their entire populaces" of Estonia and Sweden due to the "small size" of each country and "The scale of the tragedy". James Montague of Delayed Gratification wrote that the sinking had an effect on those countries' societies similar to one that the 11 September attacks had on the United States, and that the sinking was especially profound for Sweden as, in its modern history, it had not experienced other wars or calamities.

The headline of the edition of Aftonbladet covering the sinking was a single word: "Why?" (in Swedish, "Varför").

=== Conspiracy theories ===
Conspiracy theories exist about the cause of the sinking. German journalist Jutta Rabe and the British magazine New Statesman claim that laboratory tests on debris recovered illegally from Estonia's bow yielded trace evidence of a deliberate explosion, which they allege was concealed by the Swedish, British, and Russian governments to cover up an intelligence operation smuggling military hardware via the civilian ferry. Members of the Joint Accident Investigation Commission denied these claims, saying that the damage seen on the debris occurred during the visor's detachment from the vessel. The JAIC cited results from Germany's Federal Institute for Materials Research and Testing, which found that Jutta Rabe's samples did not prove an explosion occurred.

=== Transportation of military equipment ===
In the autumn of 2004, a former Swedish customs officer claimed on Sveriges Television that Estonia had been used to transport former Soviet military equipment in September 1994. The Swedish and Estonian governments subsequently launched separate investigations, which both confirmed that non-explosive military equipment was aboard the ship on 14 and 20 September 1994. According to the Swedish Ministry of Defence, no such equipment was on board on the day of the disaster, and previous investigations by the Swedish Customs Service found no reports of any anomalous activity around the day of the disaster.

In the early 2000s, a ten-page document, apparently authored by the Swedish Maritime Administration, surfaced. It alleged the ship had been carrying military nuclear material and that an explosion or collision had been the cause of the sinking. In 2025, this document was dismissed as a forgery by the Swedish Accident Investigation Authority.

== Protection of the wreck ==
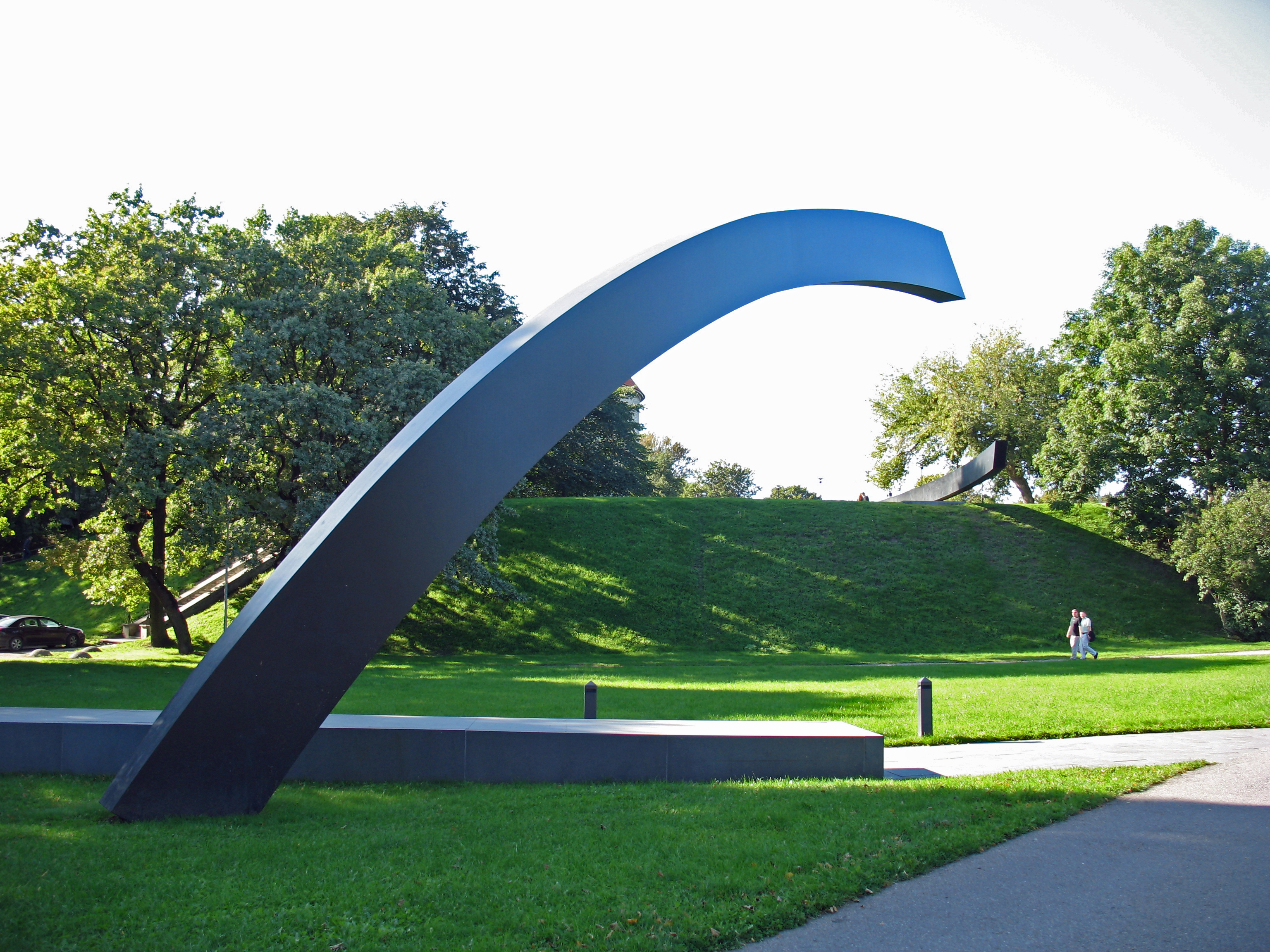
Memorial titled "Broken Line" in Tallinn, Estonia

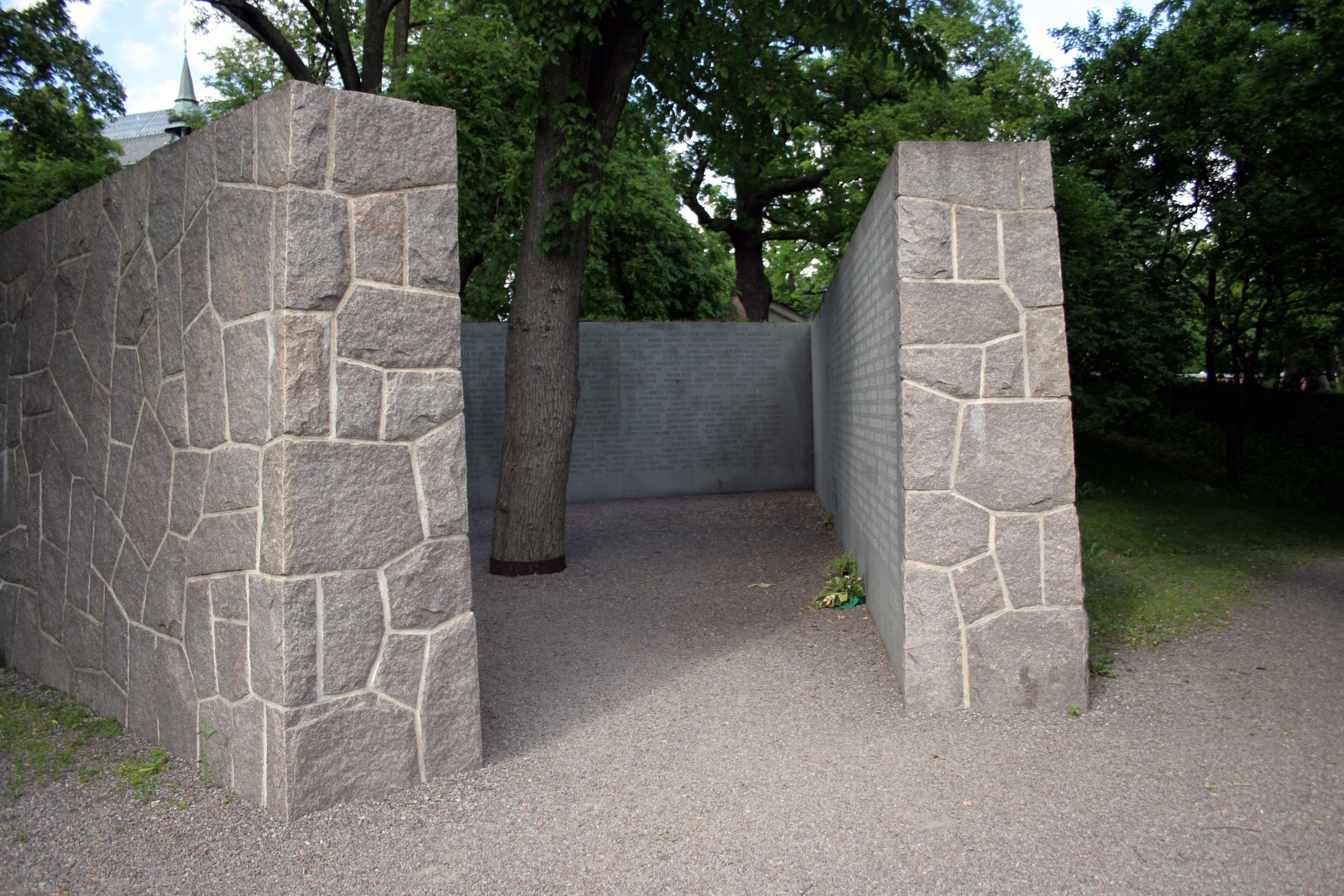
Estonia memorial in Stockholm

In the aftermath of the disaster, many relatives of the deceased demanded that their loved ones be raised from international waters and given a land burial. Demands were also made that the entire ship be raised so that the cause of the disaster could be discovered by detailed inspection. Citing the practical difficulties and the moral implications of raising decaying bodies from the sea floor (the majority of the bodies were never recovered), and fearing the financial burden of lifting the entire hull to the surface and the salvage operation, the Swedish government suggested burying the whole ship in situ with a shell of concrete.

As a preliminary step, thousands of tons of pebbles were dropped on the site. The Estonia Agreement 1995, a treaty among Sweden, Finland, Estonia, Latvia, Poland, Denmark, Russia and the United Kingdom, declared sanctity over the site, prohibiting their citizens from even approaching the wreck. The treaty is, however, only binding for citizens of the countries that are signatories. At least twice, the Swedish Navy has discovered diving operations at the wreck. The wreck's location is monitored on radar by the Finnish Navy.

== Notable passengers ==
Notable passengers of the accident voyage:

- Pierre Isacsson, described by Montague as "one of Sweden’s most popular singers." He held a karaoke event on the accident voyage, and died as a result of the sinking.
- Urmas Alender, an Estonian singer, died as a result of the sinking.

== Media ==
The sinking of the Estonia has been the subject of a number of documentaries in addition to the feature film Baltic Storm, including:

- History Channel: Sinking of the Estonia
- Zero Hour: The Sinking of the Estonia (2006)
- Built from Disaster: Ships (2009)
- Discovery Plus: Estonia (2020)

It was also mentioned in the Swedish film Force Majeure.

William Langewiesche published an in-depth recounting of the sinking in The Atlantic, interviewing several survivors.

Estonia, a Finnish eight-part television series about MS Estonia's accident, was produced by Fisher King company for the Nordic streaming service C More and released in 2023. According to the creators, the effort was the most expensive drama series ever produced in Finland.

In addition, the disaster has inspired several musical works:

- Canticum Calamitatis Maritimae, a choral work by Jaakko Mäntyjärvi
- Incantatio maris aestuosi, a choral work by Veljo Tormis
- "Estonia", a song by Marillion
- "Ever so blue", a song by Heini Vaikmaa and performed by Rodrigo Fomins
- "Vedenalainen maailma", a song by Laura Sippola
- "Estonia hukk", a lament by Virve Köster
- Lamento, for organ ("Lament over the Estonia Catastrophe") by Erland von Koch

== See also ==
- List of roll-on/roll-off vessel accidents
- List of accidents and disasters by death toll
- List of shipwrecks in 1994
