= PO-class transport ship =

Yugoslavian Navy transport ship

Class overview
- Name: PO class
- Builders: BSO Split
- Operators: Yugoslav Navy; Montenegrin Navy
- Built: 1982-1984
- Completed: 3
- Active: 1

General characteristics
- Type: Auxiliary ship
- Displacement: 882 tons standard
- Length: 58.2 m (190 ft 11 in)
- Beam: 11 m (36 ft 1 in)
- Draught: 2.8 m (9 ft 2 in)
- Propulsion: 2 Burmeister & Wain diesel engines, 2,600 kilowatts (3,480 bhp), 2 Shafts, 3 auxiliary engines
- Speed: 16 kn (30 km/h; 18 mph)
- Range: 1,500 mi (2,400 km) at 14 kn (26 km/h; 16 mph)
- Capacity: 150 fully armed troops; Six tanks; Water 38 tones; Fuel 76 tones
- Complement: 43
- Armament: Guns and missiles: Missiles: 2 x MTU-4 Strela-2M 9K32 Strela-2 surface-to-air missile; 2 "Svitac" flare rocket lunchers; Guns: 1 20/4 M-75 20mm gun; 1 40mm Bofors L70 Bofors 40 mm gun Autocannon
- Armor: Splinter plating

The PO-class consists of three small multi-role transport ships. They were built for the Yugoslav Navy by indigenous design made by Brodoprojekt Rijeka in the early 1980s at the BSO shipyard, Split, known as the Lubin class by NATO. They had a primary function of replenishing warships of the Yugoslav Navy with weapons, and as such were designated PO, short for (Serbian: Pomoćni oružar) (Ammunition Auxiliary) The first of class, Lubin (PO-91), remains in service, now in the Montenegrin Navy.

== Characteristics ==
The ships has 58.20 metres (190 ft 11 in) long, with a beam of 11.00 metres (36 ft 1 in) and a mean draught of 2.75 metres (9 ft 0 in). Displacement was 600 tonnes (590 long tons) standard and 860 tonnes (850 long tons) full load. Two B&W-Alpha diesel engines with a total rating of 2,600 kilowatts (3,480 bhp) drive two shafts, giving a speed of 16 knots (30 km/h; 18 mph). The ship had a range of 1,500 nautical miles (2,800 km; 1,700 mi) at 16 knots (30 km/h; 18 mph). The ship was fitted with a bow visor and bow ramp to aid loading and unloading of vehicles, with two slewing cranes on the upper deck. The main cargo deck could accommodate up to six small tanks like PT-76, while 150 fully armed troops could be carried in addition to the ship's crew of 43. Because of its RO-RO design it was possible to use ships from this class in their secondary role as Landing Ship, Tank. Ships where originally armed with defensive weapons. Ships that were sold were disarmed before delivery to new owners.

Class	No.	Ship	Completed	Shipyard	Shipyard No.	Note
PO-class (Socialist Federal Republic of Yugoslavia)	PO-91	Lubin	1982	Brodogradiliste Specijalnih Objekata, Split	513	In service in Montenegrin Navy
PO-class (Socialist Federal Republic of Yugoslavia)	PO-92	Ugor	1983	Brodogradiliste Specijalnih Objekata, Split	517	1996 sold to Montenegro for demolition or commercial use. In commercial service as Kairos I and Boka Star. Broken up in 2012 as Star.
PO-class (Socialist Federal Republic of Yugoslavia)	PO-93	Kit	1984	Brodogradiliste Specijalnih Objekata, Split	518	1996 sold to Montenegro for demolition or commercial use. In commercial service as Kairos II, Hope and Carlota II.

== Similar class ships ==
- Kumbhir-class tank landing ship
- Ropucha-class landing ship
- Alligator-class landing ship
- Polnocny-class landing ship
