= Klos C cargo ship seizure =

Israeli military operation

- Part of the Iran–Israel proxy conflict
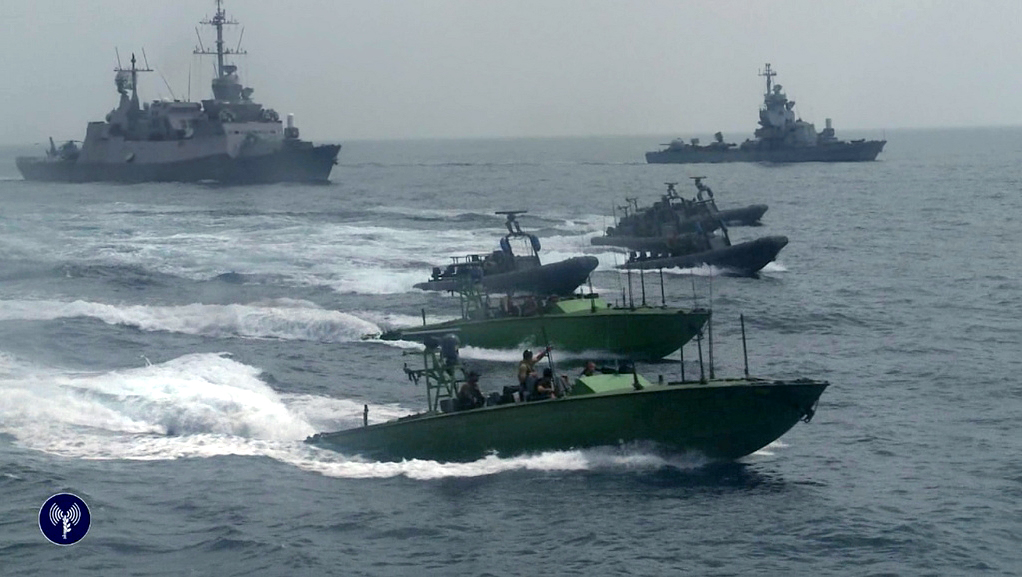
- Operation Full Disclosure task force
- Planned by: Israeli Navy
- Objective: Seize merchant vessel Klos C
- Date: 5 March 2014
- Executed by: Shayetet 13 and Shayetet 3 (INS Hanit, INS Hetz)
- Outcome: Successful Israeli naval interception

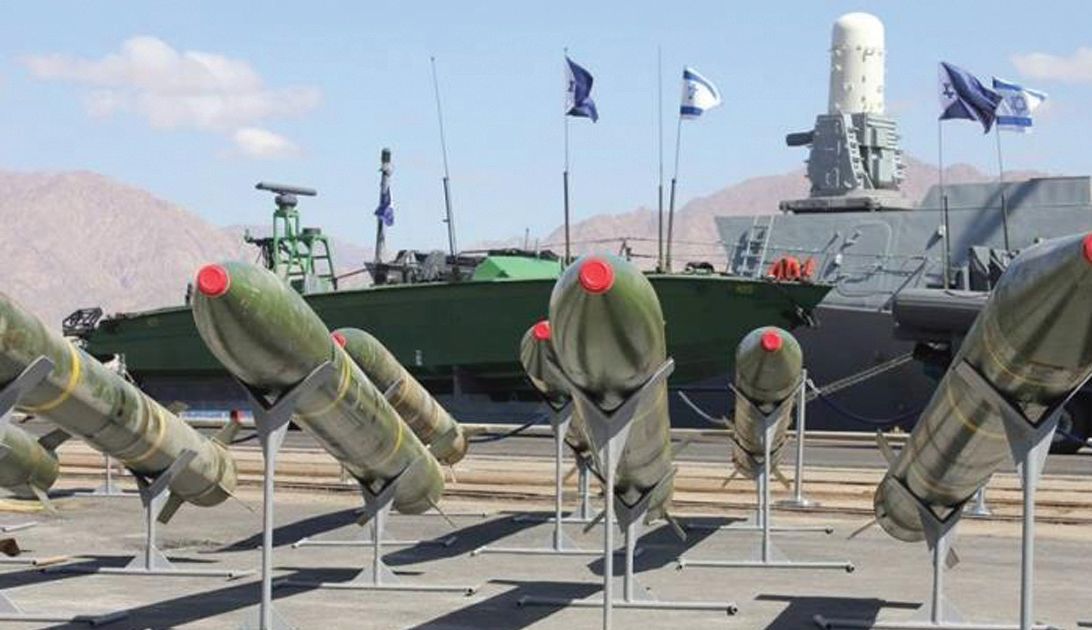
Iranian-made M-302 rockets seized by the Israeli Navy from the captured ship

The Klos C cargo ship seizure, dubbed Operation Full Disclosure (Hebrew: מבצע חשיפה מלאה), was a military operation carried out by the Israel Defense Forces on 5 March 2014, in the Red Sea. After days of surveillance far out to sea, Israeli Navy Shayetet 13 commandos seized the Iranian-owned and Panamanian-registered merchant vessel Klos C that had set sail from Iran, heading for Port Sudan via Iraq. On board, the commandos found long-range missiles suspected to be destined for the Gaza Strip concealed in containers full of Iranian bags marked as Portland cement. An unnamed senior Egyptian security official reportedly confirmed that the arms shipment was headed for militants in either Gaza or Sinai. A United Nations panel of experts concluded that the weapons came from Iran and were being sent to Sudan, accusing Iran of violating the arms embargo. United Nations Security Council Resolution 1929 authorizes states to seize items, including arms, that Iran is forbidden from exporting.

The operation was led by Major General Ram Rothberg, commander-in-chief of the Israel Navy, on board the Sa'ar 5-class corvette INS Hanit. INS Hetz, a Sa'ar 4.5-class missile boat, also participated.

== See also ==
- Francop Affair – Similar seizure of Iranian weaponry on the high seas
- Karine A Affair – Similar seizure of Iranian weaponry on the high seas
- 2010 Gaza flotilla raid – Where a ship attempting to break the blockade of Gaza was boarded and seized
- Victoria Affair – Ship carrying Iranian weapons bound from Syria to Hamas in Gaza and captured by Israel
