= Cuba–North Korea relations =

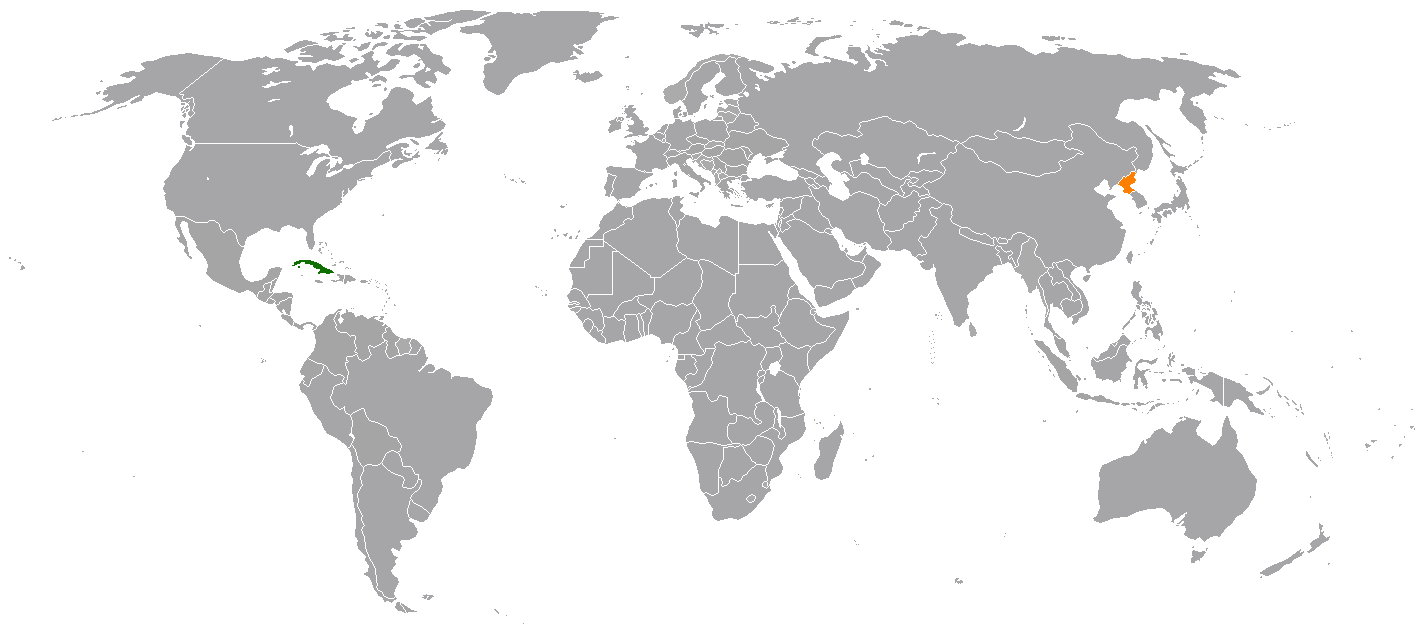

- Cuba: North Korea

Cuba–North Korea relations (Korean: 꾸바-조선민주주의인민공화국 관계, Spanish: Relaciones cubanas-coreanas del norte) are the bilateral relations between Cuba and North Korea.

Cuba has had diplomatic relations with North Korea ever since 29 August 1960. Cuba maintains an embassy in Pyongyang and North Korea maintains an embassy in Havana.

== History ==
Cuba has been one of North Korea's most consistent allies. North Korean media has historically portrayed Cubans as comrades in the common cause of socialism. During the Cold War, North Korea and Cuba forged a bond of solidarity based on their militant positions opposing American power.

Cuba and North Korea established diplomatic relations on 29 August 1960. Che Guevara, then a Cuban government minister, visited North Korea in September 1960 and proclaimed it a model for Cuba to follow. In the 1960s, North Korea sent a 103-man work brigade to Cuba to assist with the sugarcane harvest. In 1963, North Korea sent flood aid to Cuba after Hurricane Flora. In April 1965, while visiting Pyongyang, a high-level Cuban delegation stopped their vehicle in order to take a picture of a destroyed building from the Korean War. A North Korean mob, which included many schoolchildren, surrounded the delegation's vehicle, hurling racial slurs at the Afro-Cuban ambassador and pounding the car with their fists, which led the North Korean state security officials to intervene. North Korean leader Kim Il Sung personally made an apology to the Cuban government due to the incident. In 1968, Raúl Castro stated their views were "completely identical on everything".

Cuban leader Fidel Castro visited in 1986. Cuba was one of the few countries that showed solidarity with North Korea by boycotting the 1988 Summer Olympics held in Seoul, South Korea. Fidel Castro wrote that in the 1980s Kim Il Sung, "a veteran and irreproachable combatant, sent us 100,000 AK-47 rifles and its corresponding ammo without charging a cent".

In 2013, a North Korean ship, the Chong Chon Gang, was searched and detained along with its crew by the Panama Canal Authority while traveling through the Panama Canal and along with its cargo of sugar, was found to be carrying what was described by Cuban authorities as “240 metric tons of obsolete defensive weapons” from Cuba, which included anti-aircraft missile systems and MiG-21 airplanes, apparently to be repaired in North Korea and returned. According to the then security minister José Raúl Mulino members of the North Korean crew offered notable resistance through sabotage and non-compliance, such as 'cutting cables on the cranes that would be used to unload cargo' and refusing to raise the ships anchor. The ship was later released according to after a fine of nearly $700,000 USD was paid.

In January 2016, North Korea and Cuba established a barter trade system. Also in 2016, the Workers' Party of Korea and the Communist Party of Cuba met to discuss strengthening ties. After Fidel Castro's death in 2016, the North Korean government declared a three-day mourning period and sent an official delegation to his funeral. North Korean leader Kim Jong Un visited the Cuban embassy in Pyongyang to pay his respects. In 2018, the new Cuban President Miguel Díaz-Canel visited North Korea, stressing socialist solidarity and opposition to sanctions. For his birthday in 2021 Kim Jong Un sent Diaz-Canel a floral basket via the country's ambassador.

Until 2024, Cuba was one of the last countries left to only have diplomatic relations with North Korea and not maintain relations with South Korea. On 15 February 2024, Cuba established diplomatic relations with South Korea, leading to a cooling in the relationship. In November 2023, Ri Il Gyu, a political counselor at the North Korean embassy in Cuba defected to South Korea, which was confirmed in July 2024.

== See also ==
- Foreign relations of Cuba
- Foreign relations of North Korea
- Cuba–South Korea relations
