= Francop Affair =

2009 Israeli Navy seizure of cargo ship

Four Species
- Part of the Iran–Israel proxy conflict and the Hezbollah–Israel conflict
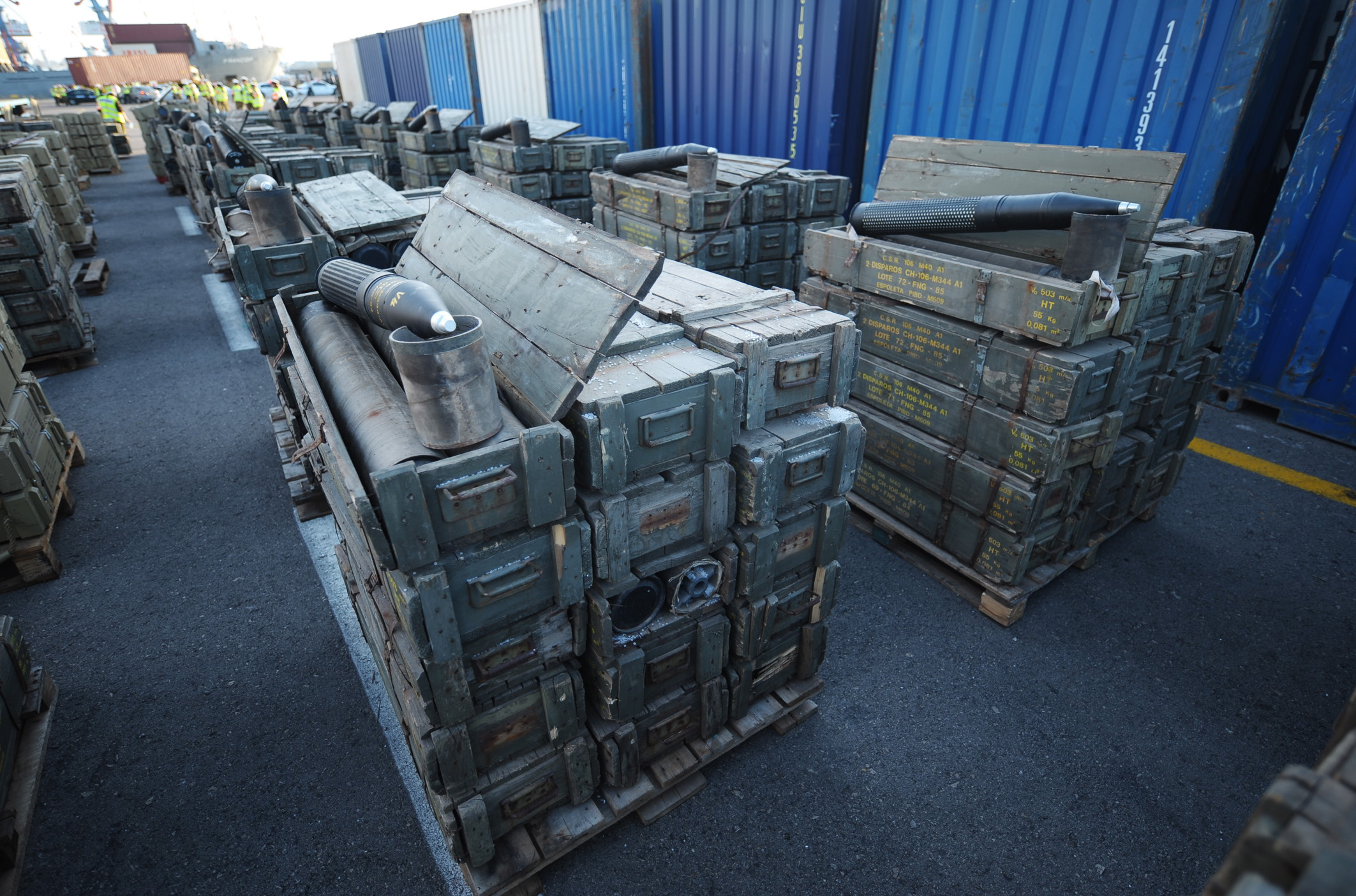
- Weaponry that was hidden under sacks of Polyethylene that served to disguise it as civilian cargo on the Francop
- Planned by: Israeli Navy
- Objective: Seize freighter Francop
- Date: 4 November 2009
- Executed by: Shayetet 13 and Shayetet 3
- Outcome: Successful Israeli naval interception

The Francop Affair was a high seas incident on November 4, 2009 in which the Israeli Navy seized the cargo ship MV Francop in the eastern Mediterranean Sea and its cargo of hundreds of tons of weapons allegedly bound from Iran to Hezbollah. The incident is also known by its military operation name, Operation Four Species.

== Operation ==
Israeli commanders had received intelligence reports that the ship MV Francop was carrying weapons originating from Iran, which were to be transferred to Hezbollah. The ship was about 160 kilometres (100 mi) off the coast of Israel, near Cyprus, when it was stopped.

On November 4, 2009, the ship was radioed by an Israeli Navy missile boat, which ordered it to halt and prepare for inspection. Shayetet 13 naval commandos then boarded the ship without resistance. The navy said that the crew was not aware of the purported smuggling and cooperated with the commandos. The commandos broke open the shipping containers and discovered crates of weapons and munitions hidden between sacks of polyethylene stacked along the openings and sides. A spokesperson for the Israel Defense Forces (IDF) said the ship was carrying "dozens of shipping containers, carrying numerous weapons, disguised as civilian cargo among hundreds of other containers on board". After boarding, the Israeli navy directed the ship to the Israeli port of Ashdod where a thorough inspection was held.

According to the IDF, the ship picked up the cargo in Damietta, Egypt; the cargo arrived in Egypt on a ship that sailed from Bandar Abbas, Iran on October 25. The ship was then set to sail to Limassol, Cyprus and then Latakia, Syria. The IDF suspects that the cargo was intended for Hezbollah, which fought Israel in the 2006 Lebanon War. Following the war, United Nations Security Council Resolution 1701 forbade the shipments of arms to Hezbollah. In 2010, the United Nations Security Council Resolution 1929 authorized states to seize items, including arms, that Iran is forbidden from exporting.

An Israeli naval chief said that the amount of weapons found is ten times more than that found during Operation Noah's Ark. The arms shipment weighed 320 tons and were held in containers marked with Iranian shipping codes.

The seized weaponry consisted of 9,000 mortar shells, 2,125 107-mm Katyusha rockets, 685 rocket fuses, 690 122-mm rockets, 21,100 F-1 fragmentation hand grenades, and 566,220 AK-47 rounds. The Israeli military said that the shipment was equivalent to about ten percent of Hezbollah's stocks. The arms shipment was the largest ever seized by Israel.

On November 5, 2009, ambassadors and diplomats from 44 countries, military attaches from 27 armies in the world, and the international media were invited by the IDF and the Foreign Ministry to show them the weapons and munitions seized from the Francop ship.

== Reactions ==
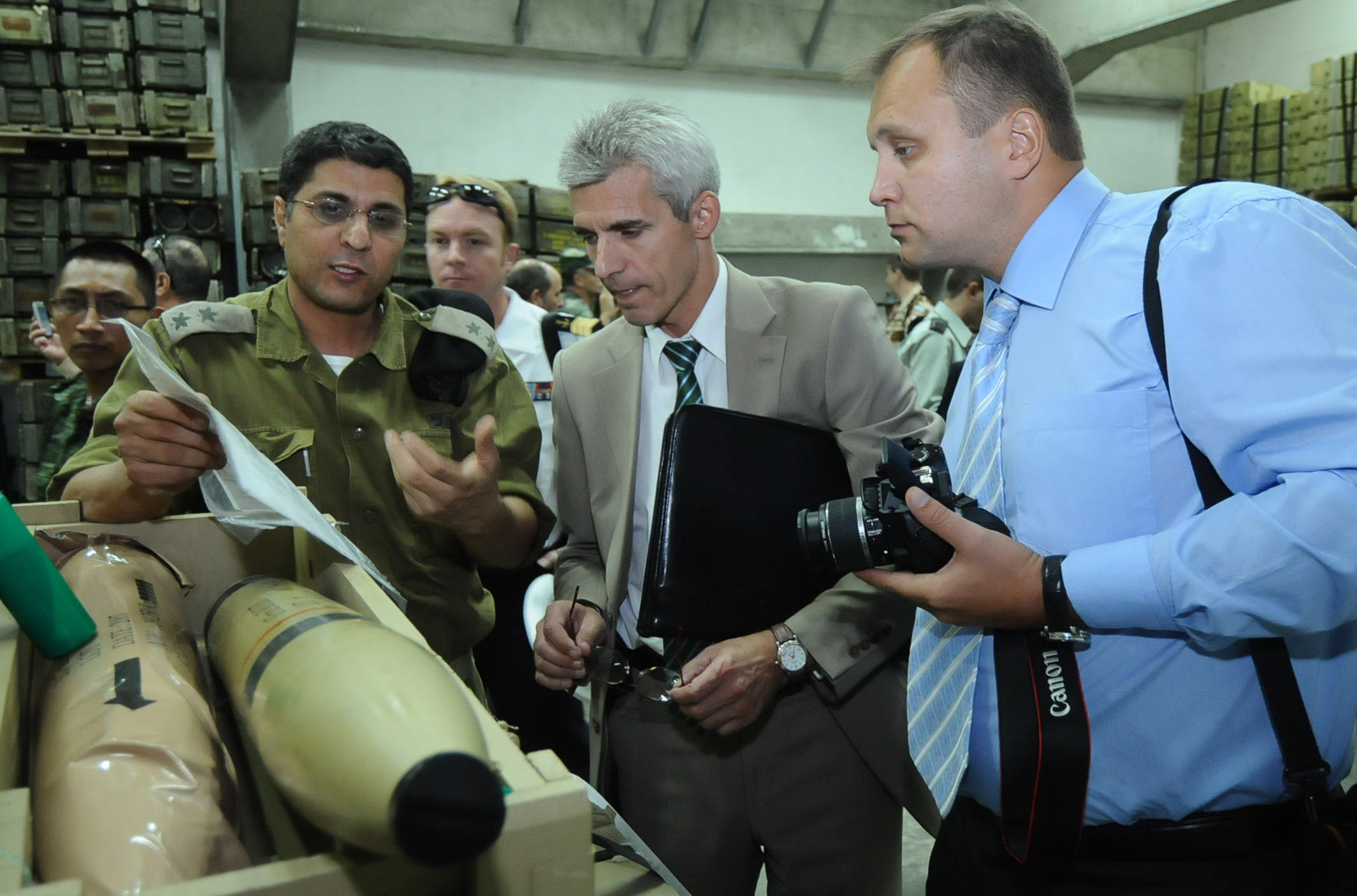
Ambassadors and military attaches witness weapons seized from Francop

President of Israel Shimon Peres said, "Today the whole world can see the large gap between Syria and Iran's statements and their actual activities. The ship's arrest is not only of critical military importance, but also of political importance. Facts cannot be argued with." Prime Minister Benjamin Netanyahu called it " a war crime that the UN Security Council should have a special meeting over".

Hezbollah made a statement to the press in which it denied "any connection with the weapons which the Zionist enemy claims it seized aboard the Francop ship". Palestinian Authority spokesperson Ghassan Khatib stated that "Since the Israeli leadership and society are not ready for peace, they are using any pretext to shun peace obligations, and one is the issue of the Iranian shipment".

An Iranian media source commentary claimed that "Israeli propaganda" was aimed at diverting attention from U.N. allegations of Israeli war crimes during the Gaza War. Syrian Foreign Minister Walid Muallem said, "Unfortunately, some official pirates in the seas, sometimes in the name of the navy, sometimes in the name of inspection, obstruct trade movement between Syria and Iran. This ship does not carry Iranian weapons to Syria and does not contain military material to manufacture weapons in Syria. This ship carries imported goods from Syria to Iran." After photos of the shipment was released by Israel the IRNA news agency claimed the shipping manifest from the "Ministry of Sepah" was forged citing that the Sepah ministry was renamed to "Defense Ministry" more than 20 years ago and that "if a country plans to send a secret arms cargo to another, it will not brand the shipment with a full description". In response the Israel MFA say that those 'Sepah' customs labels were found on some old crates of ammunition (7.62mm bullets, 122mm rockets and 106mm anti-tank shells).

== See also ==
- Operation Full Disclosure - Similar seizure of Iranian weaponry on the high seas in 2014
- Karine A affair - Similar seizure of Iranian weaponry on the high seas in 2002
- 2010 Gaza flotilla raid - Where a ship attempting to break the blockade of Gaza was boarded and seized
- Victoria Affair - Ship carrying Iranian weapons bound from Syria to Hamas in Gaza and captured by Israel
