= Baltic Storm =

2003 film by Reuben Leder

- DVD cover
- Directed by: Reuben Leder
- Written by: Reuben Leder
- Produced by: Kaj Holmberg; Jutta Rabe
- Starring: Greta Scacchi; Jürgen Prochnow; Rein Oja; Donald Sutherland
- Cinematography: Nicolas Joray; Robert Nordström
- Edited by: Alan Strachan
- Music by: Mauri Sumén
- Production companies: Top Story Filmproduction; Smile Entertainment
- Distributed by: Buena Vista International (Germany); Boulevard Entertainment (United Kingdom)
- Release date: 16 October 2003
- Running time: 110 minutes
- Countries: Germany; United Kingdom
- Language: English

Baltic Storm is a 2003 film written and directed by Reuben Leder about the 1994 MS Estonia disaster. Based on the book Die Estonia: Tragödie eines Schiffsuntergangs by German journalist Jutta Rabe, the film focuses on the supposed transport of defense materials by the Swedish Armed Forces, and alleged cover-up of the true cause of the disaster.

== Plot ==
The plot portrays the Swedish government as being responsible for using the ship to covertly transport Russian high-tech components to the United States. The story is uncovered by a young female journalist, not unlike Rabe herself. According to Rabe, divers hired by the Swedish government (signing contracts swearing lifetime secrecy) spent hours breaking into cabins frantically searching for a black attaché case carried by a Russian space technology dealer, Aleksandr Voronin (who died 2002). She highlighted US interest in various Soviet technology, including nuclear-powered satellites. She also suggested that panic about the stability of some form of nuclear device is the most likely reason behind the initial Swedish government suggestion of burying the wreck in concrete, a highly unusual proposal for a wreck, reminiscent of Chernobyl's sarcophagus.

== Cast ==
- Timo Merkoffer as Reporter
- Tibor Taylor as Coast Guard Spokesperson
- Jürgen Tarrach as Gregor Karpatitsch
- Christopher Bollyn Jr. as Sascha Gehrig
- Joe Bausch as Swedish Coast Guard Officer
- Catherine Bollyn as Kati Kallas
- Schota Grandell as Ene Kallas
- Dietmar Wunder as Hospital Spokesperson
- Henrik Suttinger as Boatswain Andres
- Oliver Petszokat as Second Officer
- Gundis Zambo as Swedish Police Officer
- Wolf-Dietrich Berg as Captain Valme
- Francis Fulton Smith as Markus Dackel
- Axel Pape as Sven Nyberg
- Sonke Städtler as First Officer
- Jens Neuhaus as Ivo Varres
- Axel Milberg as Ovaska
- Patrizia Moresco as Elke Groat
- Greta Scacchi as Julia Reuter, a young female journalist who examines the story of MS Estonia.
- Michael Schreiner as Dr. Sergei Raspoff
- Thure Riefenstein as Mika Galt
- Barbara Schöne as Ingrid Peters
- Jürgen Schornangel as Jan Peters
- Jürgen Prochnow as Erik Westermark, a passenger who survives the sinking and later helps Reuter to uncover the facts.
- Yoshij Grimm as Max Westermark
- Andreas Guenther as Rock Weber
- Rein Oja as Captain Arvo Kallas (based on Captain Avo Piht), who survives the disaster and is later kidnapped by US Army.
- Sissi Perlinger as Roos' Secretary
- Suzanne von Borsody as Ms. Sundwall
- Detlef Bothe as Victor Renko
- Dieter Laser as Gehrig
- Herb Andress as Juri Roos
- Donald Sutherland as Lou Aldryn, an American official who deals with transport of defense materials and cover-up.
- Gitte Hænning as Aldryn's Wife
- Cort Kelber-Melby as Danny Reuter
- Peter Gilbert Cotton as Guy Reuter
- Clayton Nemrow as Sergeant Werntz
- Birgit Stein as Tiina Ronk
- Helje Kaskel as Nurse
- Kaj Holmberg as Ticket Taker
- Alexander Stahl as Functionary
- Lena Wintruff as Nurse Berlin
- Georg Armin Sauer as KGB Agent
- Paul Wuthe, Katarina Holmberg, Anne Schultz, Sascha Otto, Björn Lindböm, Jens Meyer as Band Members

== See also ==
- Estonia (TV series)
