= Montenegrin Navy =

- Mornarica Vojske Crne Gore
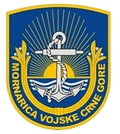
- Emblem of the Montenegrin Navy
- Active: 2007
- Country: Montenegro
- Type: Navy
- Role: Control, protect and defend territorial sea
- Size: 13 vessels
- Part of: Armed Forces of Montenegro
- H/Q: Naval base Bar
- Engagements: Operation ATALANTA

Commanders
- Commander: Captain Goran Đurković

Insignia
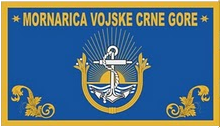
- Flag

- Ensign

- Jack

The Montenegrin Navy (Montenegrin: Mornarica Vojske Crne Gore) is the naval branch of the military of Montenegro.

The Montenegrin Navy was established in 2006 following the secession of Montenegro from the State Union of Serbia and Montenegro. Nearly all of the navy's equipment was inherited from the armed forces of the State Union—as Montenegro contained the entire coastline of the former union, it retained practically the entire naval force. A large part of the aforementioned equipment has however been retired.

== Structure ==
- Navy (Montenegrin: Mornarica)
  - Naval Surface Forces (Površinske pomorske snage)
    - Patrol Boat 33 (Patrolni Brod 33)
    - Patrol Boat 34 (Patrolni Brod 34)
    - Rescue Detachment (Odred za spašavanje)
  - Observation Forces (Snage za osmatranje)
    - Coastal Surveillance Detachment (Odred za nadzor mora)
  - Special Forces (Specijalne snage)
    - Marine Detachment (Pomorski odred)
  - Training ship Jadran (Školski brod "Jadran")
  - Serving Platoon (Vod za opsluživanje)

== Purpose ==
1. Deterring the armed threat to Montenegro:
  - Preparations for the defense (training, exercising and maintaining a high level of combat readiness).
  - Defence Cooperation
2. Defense of the territorial waters:
  - Protection of the sovereignty of the waters and air space above it.
  - Defending against unconventional threats against the armed forces.
3. Support to allied forces that are engaged in the defense of Montenegro.

== Bases ==
Montenegrin Navy bases
- Bar Naval base (Bar)
- Pero Ćetković base (Bar)
- Pristan base (Herceg Novi)

== Vessels ==
Class	Number	Country manufactured	Notes	Photo
Offshore Patrol Vessels
Kership OPV 60	2 ordered	France		
Fast attack craft
Končar class fast attack craft	2 in active service	Yugoslavia	P-105 Durmitor; RTOP-406 Ante Banina; Both are to be converted to patrol boats. RTOP-405 recommissioned as P105 Durmitor patrol boat. No funds assigned as yet for conversion of RTOP-406 into a patrol boat.	
Patrol boat
Silver Ships CFRB	4 in active service	United States	Donated by the US.	
Transport and support
PO-class	1 in reserve	Yugoslavia	PO91	
Tugboats
Salvage tug	2 in active service	Yugoslavia	PR-41 (Orada); LR-77	
Sailing ship
Motor sailboat	2 in active service	Yugoslavia	Bojana; Milena	
Jadran	1 in active service	Germany	Used as a training ship	
Motorboat
Diving boat	2 in active service	Yugoslavia	-Ronilačka baraksa 81 -Ronilačka barkasa 85	
Motor boat	1 in active service	Yugoslavia	ČM 33	
Motor boat Polycat	1 in active service	Netherlands		
Inflatable boat
Valiant 620PT	2 in active service	United Kingdom	Used by Marine Platoon	
Motor yacht
Jadranka	1 for sale	Yugoslavia	VIP Yacht	
Floating crane
Floating crane	1 in active service	Yugoslavia	LDI 18	

== Ranks ==
=== Commissioned officer ranks ===
The rank insignia of commissioned officers.

NATO code	OF-10	OF-9	OF-8	OF-7	OF-6	OF-5	OF-4	OF-3	OF-2	OF-1
Montenegrin Navy
Montenegrin Navy		Admiral	Vice admiral	Kontra admiral	Komodor	Kapetan bojnog broda	Kapetan fregate	Kapetan korvete	Poručnik bojnog broda	Poručnik fregate	Poručnik korvete

=== Other ranks ===
The rank insignia of non-commissioned officers and enlisted personnel.

NATO code	OR-9	OR-8	OR-7	OR-6	OR-5	OR-4	OR-3	OR-2	OR-1
Montenegrin Navy
Montenegrin Navy	Zastavnik 1 klase	Zastavnik	Stariji vodnik 1 klase	Stariji vodnik	Vodnik 1 klase	Vodnik	Mlađi vodnik	Desetar	Razvodnik
