= Victoria Affair =

Israeli military operation

Operation Iron Law
- Part of Iran–Israel proxy conflict
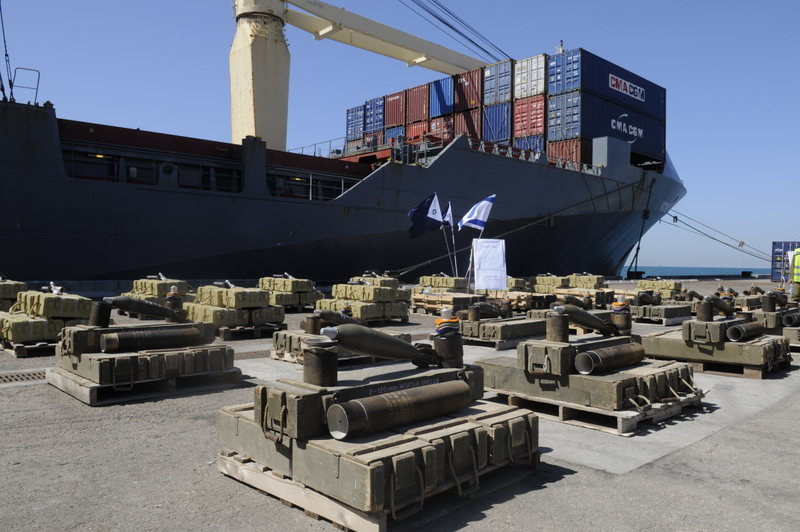
- Display of the weapons found aboard Victoria
- Planned by: Israeli Sea Corps
- Objective: Seize suspected Iranian arms shipment on freighter Victoria
- Date: March 15, 2011
- Executed by: Shayetet 13 and Shayetet 3
- Outcome: Success

The Victoria Affair (code name Operation Iron Law) was a military operation conducted by the Israel Defense Forces (IDF) in March 2011 in which the Israeli Navy intercepted the Liberian-flagged container vessel Victoria in the international waters of the Mediterranean Sea, and discovered concealed weapons which, according to the IDF, were destined for Palestinian militant organizations in the Gaza Strip. The vessel was found to be carrying approximately 50 tons of weapons, including C-704 anti-ship missiles, rocket launchers, radar systems, mortar shells and rifle ammunition.

== Background ==
Israel maintains a naval blockade of the Gaza Strip to prevent the smuggling of arms into the hands of militant organizations based there. In 2003, Israeli commandos intercepted Karine A in the Red Sea, and seized 50 tons of missiles, mortars, rifles and ammunition which it said were destined for Gaza. In 2009, the Israeli Navy intercepted the Iranian vessel Francop off the coast of Cyprus, carrying hundreds of tons of weapons. Iran is Hamas's main arms provider, smuggling weapons overland through Sudan and Sinai in addition to using the sea route.

== Operation ==
Israeli commanders were acting on intelligence reports indicating that 39 of the 100 containers on deck were loaded with Iranian weapons while at port in Syria, and were to be transferred to Hamas. Victoria was seized about 200 nautical miles (370 km; 230 mi) from the Israeli coast, while on its way from Turkey to El-Arish port in Egypt (other sources give the destination as Alexandria, Egypt). According to the IDF, the ship picked up the cargo in the Port of Latakia in Syria and sailed to Mersin, Turkey.

The ship was intercepted by Israeli Navy missile ships, which radioed the captain and questioned him about his point of origin and planned destination, then informed him that his ship was suspected of carrying illegal cargo, and requested permission to board for an inspection. The captain agreed, and ordered the vessel stopped. Several minutes later, speedboats carrying commandos from Israel's elite naval unit, Shayetet 13, pulled alongside the ship. A ladder was dropped for them to climb aboard. The commandos boarded with their weapons at the ready out of concern that there could be Iranian or Hamas operatives on board. The commandos ordered the crew to assemble on the bridge, and then began inspecting the cargo. The IDF said the ship's crew was unaware it was carrying concealed weapons. The ship was redirected to the Port of Ashdod for further inspection. After the contraband was unloaded, Israel announced it would release Victoria and allow it to continue its journey to the Egyptian port of Alexandria.

According to the IDF's Deputy Navy Commander Rear Admiral Rani Ben-Yehuda, the weapons may have been transported from Iran to Syria several weeks earlier, when two Iranian warships sailed through the Suez Canal.

== The shipment ==
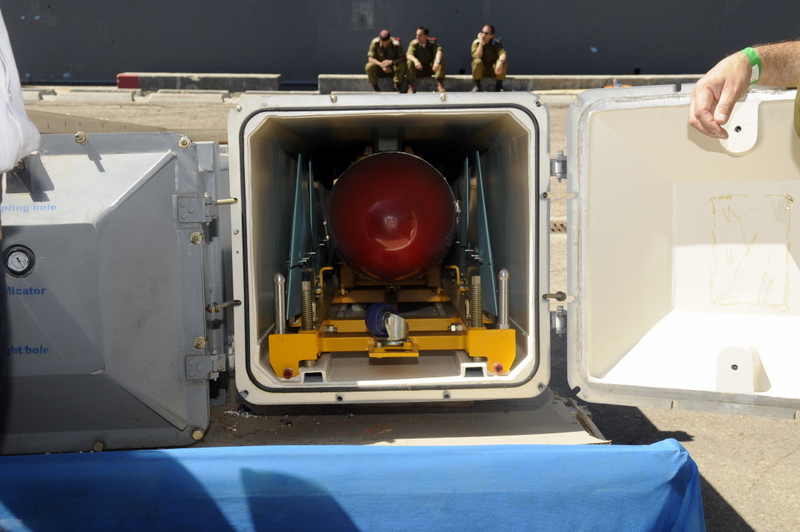
C-704 found aboard Victoria

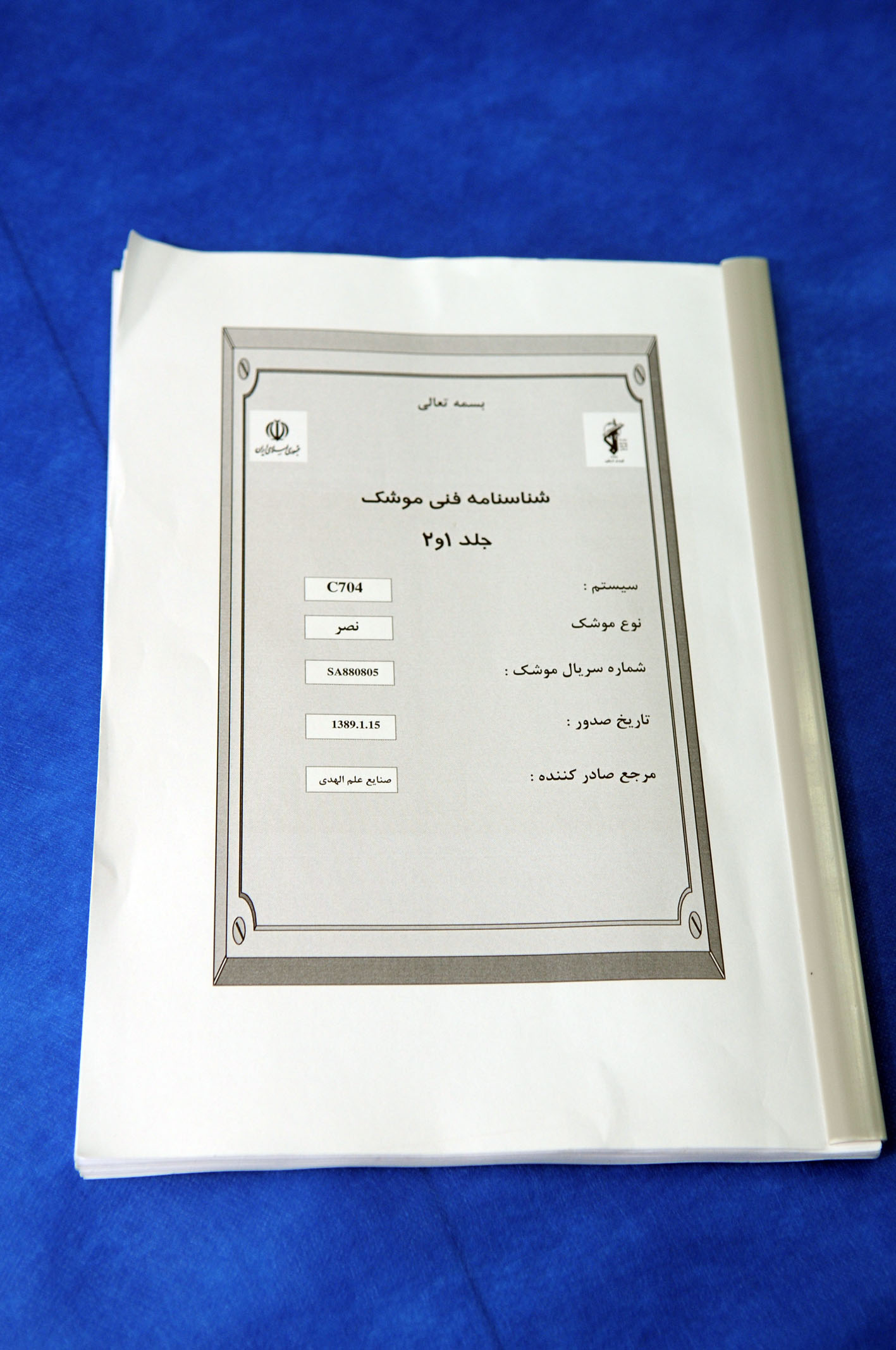
Missile identification document in Persian which bears the Iranian governmental emblem found on board Victoria

Concealed in three containers hidden beneath cotton bags and lentils produced in Syria were the following weapon systems:

- 6 C-704 anti-ship missiles
- 230 mortar shells, caliber 120 mm
- 2,270 mortar shells, caliber 60 mm
- 2 radar systems manufactured in England
- 2 rocket launchers
- 2 hydraulic mounting cranes for the radar system
- 66,960 7.62×39mm rounds (Commonly used in the AKM).

According to the IDF, the weapons were accompanied by user manuals in Persian. The packing slip for the 60 mm mortar also included a range table for use with a model AZ111-A2 impact fuse, made exclusively by Iran. In an attempt to mislead would-be inspectors, "Made in Britain" labels were attached to all of the crates.

The C-704 missile has a range of 35 kilometers (22 mi), and a 130-kilogram (290 lb) explosive warhead capable of sinking a 1,000-ton ship. According to The Jerusalem Post, had the six missiles the ship was carrying arrived in the Gaza Strip, they "would have forced the navy to change the way it operates. It now operates just a few kilometers from shore; this would no longer be possible".

== Responses ==
- Israel: The Israeli Foreign Ministry instructed its ambassador to the UN to file a complaint to the UN Security Council's sanctions committee over Iran's efforts to smuggle arms to the Gaza Strip, as a violation of UNSC resolution 1747, which forbids Iran to export arms.
- Iran: Iran's Chief of Staff General Ataollah Salehi denied the allegations that Iran was behind the shipment and was quoted as saying "Israel is a regime based on a lie, and it manufactures lies and fabrications"
- United States: Spokesman for the U.S. State Department Mark C. Toner released a press statement saying: "In light of the recent seizure of advanced arms and related material by Israel and Egypt bound for terrorist groups, the United States reiterates its strong condemnation of illicit smuggling activities. We underscore that all countries have obligations under relevant United Nations Security Council resolutions to prevent such trafficking in arms and ammunition. Iran, in particular, is prohibited by United Nations Security Council resolution 1747 from exporting any arms and related materials. Any activity to the contrary is another example of Iran’s destabilizing activities in the region. We call upon all regional countries to enforce these obligations. We will continue to work closely with our partners to prevent the shipment of arms to terrorist groups."

== See also ==
- Operation Four Species – Similar seizure of Iranian weaponry on the high seas
- Karine A affair – Similar seizure of Iranian weaponry on the high seas
- Santorini affair – Similar seizure of Gaza-bound weapons on the high seas
- Annie Larsen
- Boka Star
- Chong Chon Gang
- United Nations Security Council Resolution 1747
