= Jutta Rabe =

German journalist

- Born: 1955 (age 70–71)
- Writing career
- Genre: journalism
- Notable work: Die Estonia: Tragödie eines Schiffsuntergangs

Jutta Rabe (born 1955) is a German journalist and a former treasurer of the Berlin chapter of the German Federation of Journalists.

== Life ==
Jutta Rabe studied economics and journalism.

She worked as a freelancer for the German TV magazine Spiegel-TV for a number of years, as well as for Focus TV, ZDF, ARTE and NDR.

Her book, Die Estonia: Tragödie eines Schiffsuntergangs (ISBN 3-7688-1267-7, ISBN 3-7688-1460-2), about the alleged cover-up of the true cause of the September 1994 M/S Estonia passenger ferry disaster, was made into the 2003 film Baltic Storm. The video footage of her group's diving expedition to the Estonia shipwreck allegedly reveals holes in the ship's hull, suggesting that explosives played a role in the tragedy. Spiegel-TV has dissociated itself from her coverage of the Estonia disaster.

In the summer of 2000, Sweden issued an arrest warrant against Rabe for violating the sanctity of the shipwreck, in violation of the Estonia Agreement of 1995, barring her from entering Sweden on pain of prosecution.
