= Cuba–South Korea relations =

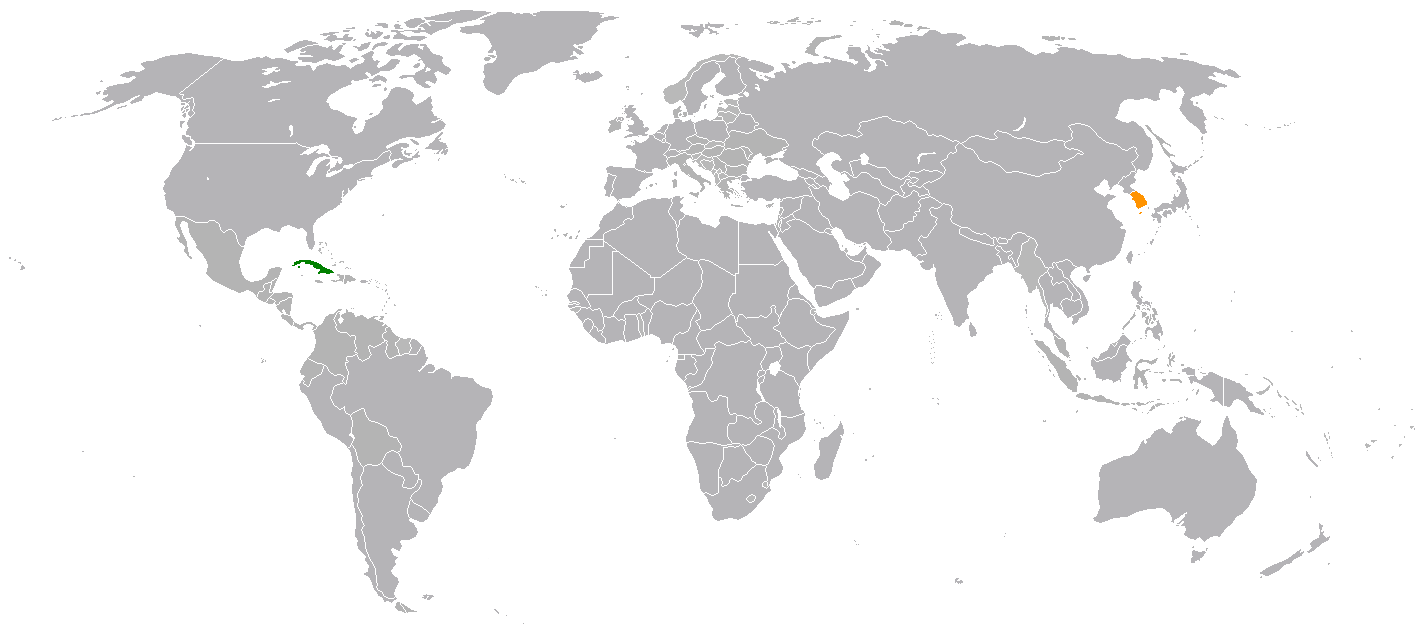

- Cuba: South Korea

Diplomatic mission
- Cuban Embassy, Seoul: South Korean Embassy, Havana

Cuba–South Korea relations are the bilateral relations between Cuba and South Korea. Cuba and South Korea formally established relations on 14 February 2024. Cuba has an embassy in Seoul while South Korea has an embassy in Havana.

== History ==
The delay to establish relations stemmed from the special situation of the division between the North and the South. In 1948, when the Republic of Korea (South Korea) was recognized as a member of the international community with the establishment of its government, Cuba also recognized the Republic of Korea on 12 July 1949. It also provided $2.79 million in aid to the Republic of Korea during the Korean War. However, following the establishment of a socialist system through the Cuban Revolution led by Fidel Castro in 1959, Cuba announced its special relationship with the Democratic People's Republic of Korea (North Korea), which shared a socialist and anti-American line, and severed ties with the Republic of Korea. As a result, Cuba was hostile to South Korea, which was part of the Western bloc, led by the United States, during the Cold War, and emphasized its friendship with North Korea by boycotting the 1988 Summer Olympics in Seoul, South Korea, along with North Korea.

Cuba turned to pragmatic diplomacy in order to overcome economic difficulties caused by the end of the Cold War system and the tightening of U.S. sanctions, but it was lukewarm in establishing diplomatic relations with the Republic of Korea because it valued diplomatic relations with the Democratic People's Republic of Korea. At the United Nations General Assembly in October 1999 during the Kim Dae-jung administration, the Republic of Korea voted for the first time in favor of a resolution calling for the lifting of the United States embargo against Cuba, and in 2000 it announced its first proposal to normalize relations with Cuba. Later, during the Lee Myung-bak administration, the establishment of consular relations with Cuba was proposed, and the Park Geun-hye, Moon Jae-in, and Yoon Suk-yeol governments also proposed the establishment of diplomatic relations with Cuba, but this was not done due to the Cuban government's passive attitude. In 2005, the Korea Trade-Investment Promotion Agency (KOTRA) established a trade center in Havana, playing a key role in trade and commerce exchanges between the Republic of Korea and Cuba. Despite not having diplomatic relations with the Republic of Korea, Cuba became actively engaged in economic and cultural exchanges.

In 2016, South Korean Foreign Minister Yun Byung-se visited Cuba for the first time and conveyed his intention to establish diplomatic relations with Cuba. Several meetings with foreign ministers followed, but no concrete agreement was reached. Prior to the establishment of diplomatic relations between South Korea and Cuba, the Embassy of the Republic of Korea in Mexico served as consular officer for Cuba, and the Embassy of Cuba in Japan served as consular officer for the Republic of Korea under the Cuban government.

== Diplomatic relations ==
South Korea and Cuba agreed to establish ambassadorial-level diplomatic relations between the two countries on 14 February 2024, through the exchange of diplomatic letters at the Representatives of the Governments of the two countries to the United Nations in New York, but the ceremony took place under extreme security in view of opposition from North Korea.

On 12 June 2024, the two countries declared that they will be sending diplomats within the following week after finalizing their preparations to open embassies in Havana and Seoul. The event occurred when Cuba dispatched its initial delegation to South Korea following the agreement to restore diplomatic ties.

== Economic ties ==
In 2024, the South Korean government focused on the possibility of cooperation with Cuba in the energy sector. The government saw the possibility of cooperation in medical and biotechnology as well.

The South Korean Presidential office said:

"Cuba had been an untapped market. Direct trade is still very limited due to the United States sanctions, but we will take this opportunity of the formal diplomatic ties to lay the groundwork for gradual expansion of economic cooperation."

== See also ==
- Foreign relations of Cuba
- Foreign relations of South Korea
- Cuba–North Korea relations
