= Broken Line =

Memorial to the victims of the MS Estonia

Coordinates: 59°26′33″N 24°45′01″E

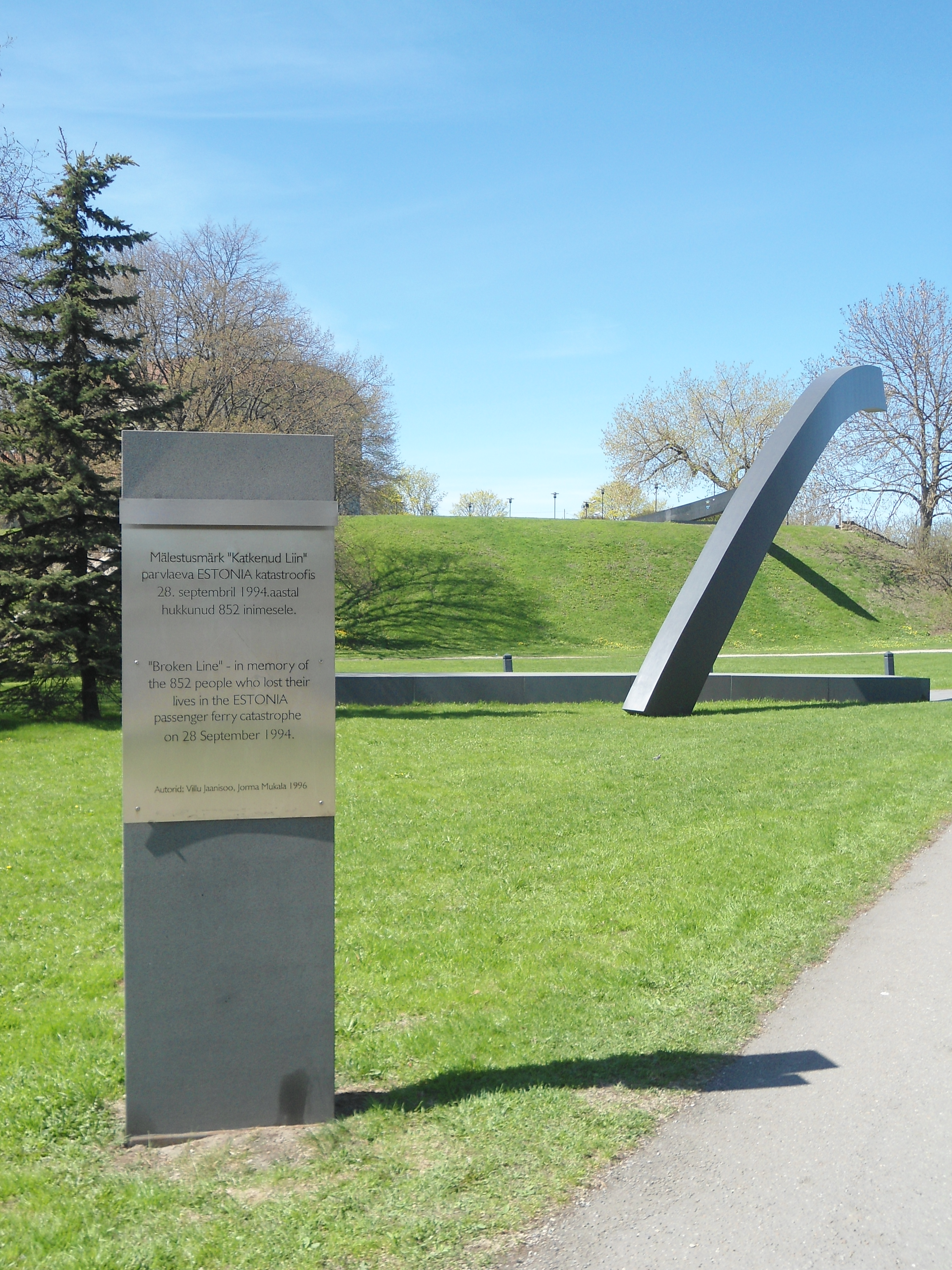
The Broken Line monument in Tallinn

The Broken Line (Estonian: Katkenud liin) was erected to commemorate the lives lost in the sinking of the MS Estonia on 28 September 1994. It is located in the Kesklinn district of Tallinn in Estonia.

The monument replaced the simple wooden cross which was previously erected at the same location in memory of the Estonian victims. The monument is made of black granite, in the form of a broken line or arch. The arches are directed towards each other from each end, but never meet. A large memorial stone with the names of all the victims engraved is part of the artwork. The memorial was unveiled the day before the second anniversary of the Estonia disaster, on 27 September 1996, by the then President of Estonia Lennart Meri.
