= Klos C =

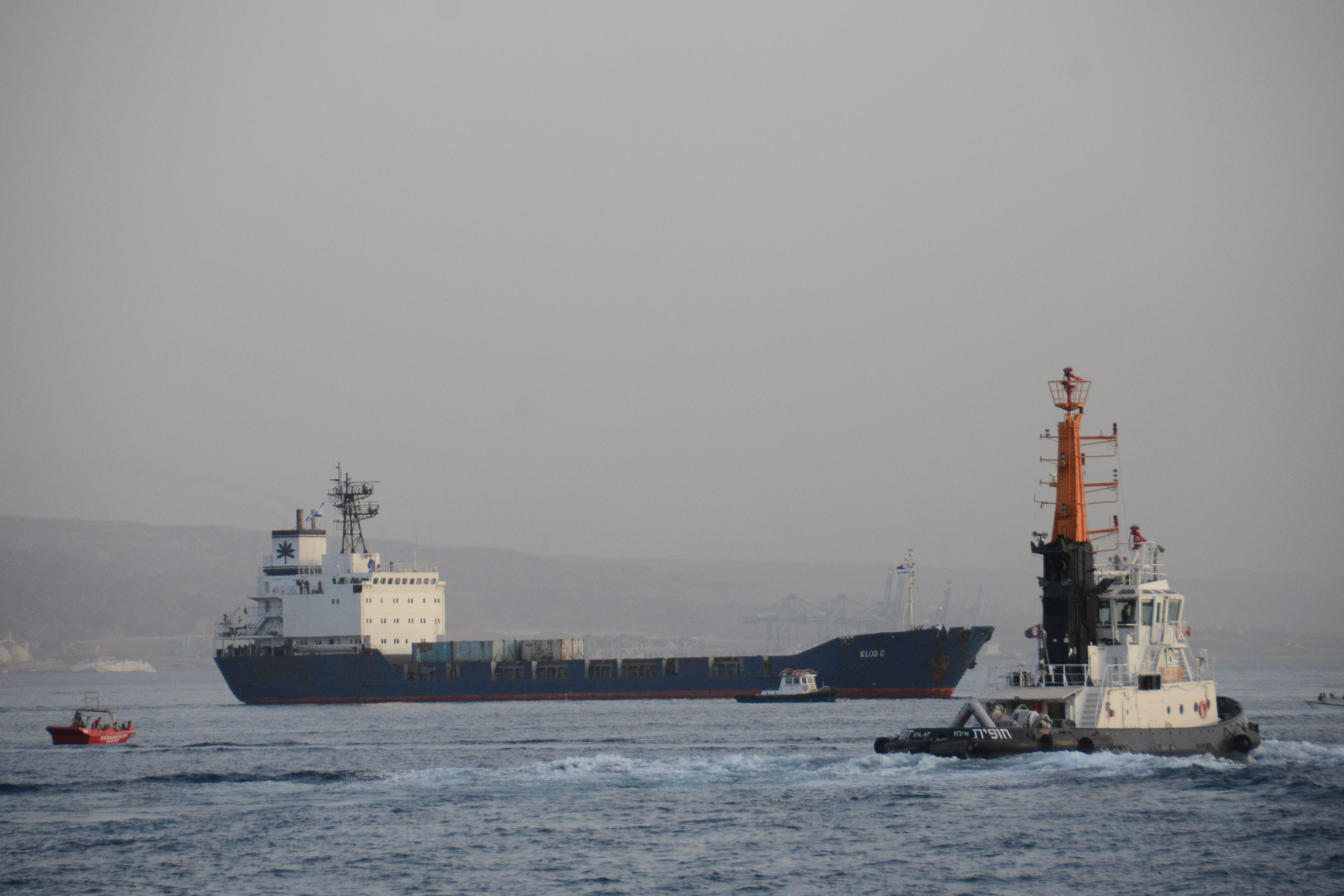

History
- Name: Klos C
- Operator: Whitesea Shipping & Trading Company Limited
- Port of registry: Panama registered; Marshall Islands owned
- Builder: Severnaya Verf
- Launched: 5 April 1996
- Completed: 1996
- Identification: IMO number: 8918710; MMSI Number 373773000; Callsign 3FWB8
- Fate: Scrapped 2014

General characteristics
- Tonnage: 5,622 GT 6,985 DWT
- Length: 108.8 m (356 ft 11 in)
- Beam: 17.8 m (58 ft 5 in)
- Draught: 5.6 m (18 ft 4 in)
- Speed: 9.8 knots (18.1 km/h) Maximum

Klos C was a Marshall Islands-owned, Panamanian-registered merchant cargo ship. The Klos C was built in 1996, in Saint Petersburg, Russia by the shipbuilders Severnaya Verf. At the time of its christening, it was briefly known by the name Otztal, after which its name was changed to Klostertal and then Klos C in July, 2012.

== Operation Full Disclosure ==
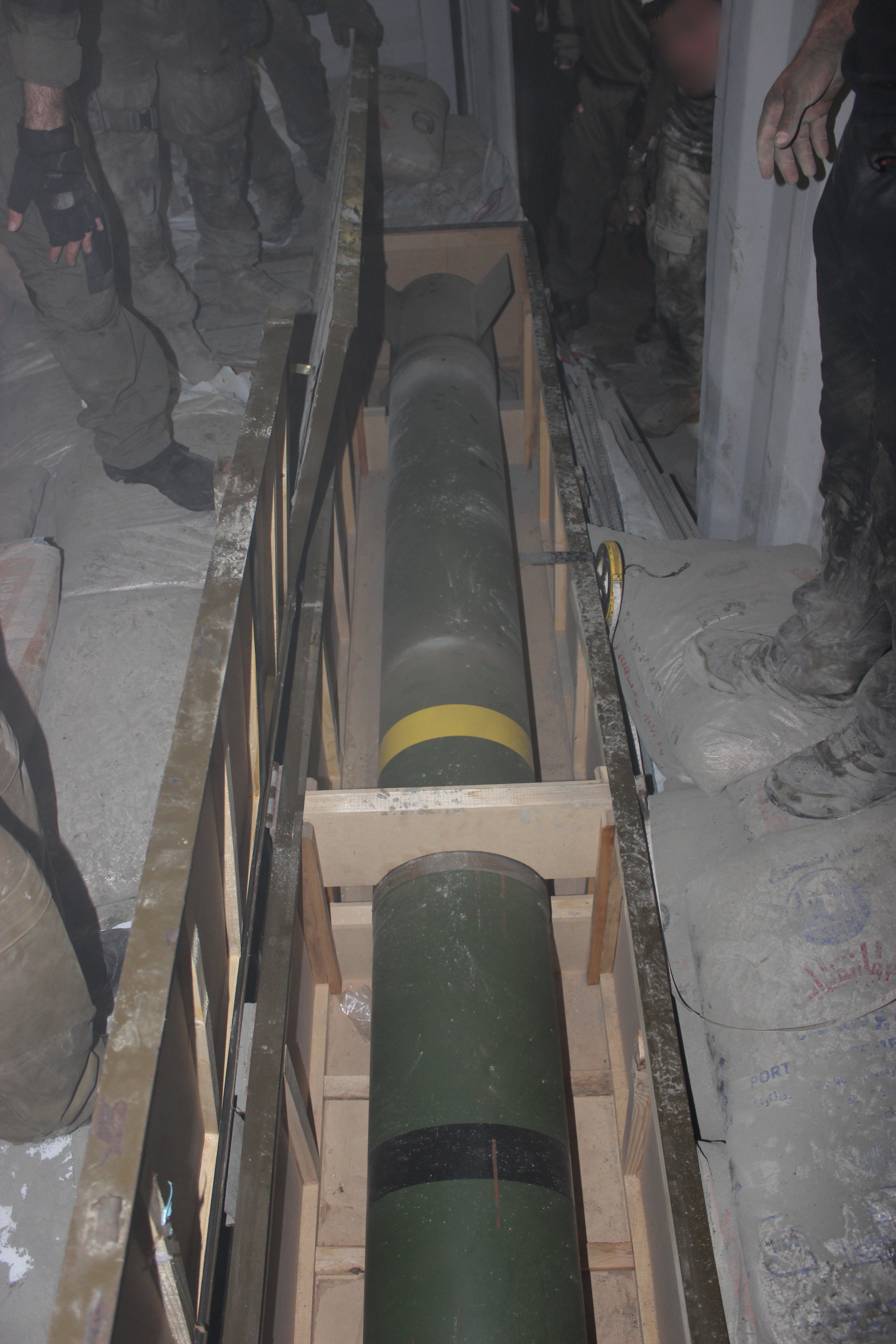
IDF photo of one of the captured long-range rockets found on the Klos C

On March 5, 2014, the Israeli Navy boarded the vessel in the Red Sea during Operation Full Disclosure, suspecting that it was carrying weapons destined for militant groups in the Gaza Strip from the Islamic Republic of Iran. A large quantity of long-range missiles, identified by the Israel Defense Forces (IDF) as M-302s, were found concealed under bags of Portland cement on the ship, which was then directed to berth in Israel. With the Klos C secured by the IDF, and with the cooperation of its captain, the Panamanian flag it had been sailing under was lowered, and the flag of Israel as well as the Israeli Navy ensign were raised. The freighter was then escorted to Israel in a convoy. After docking in the port city of Eilat, the Israelis unloaded the Klos C's cargo and discovered an additional 181 mortars, and 400,000 rounds of ammunition meant to be used in assault rifles. Israel seized the cargo, and placed it on public display.

Following the search of the ship and confiscation of weapons found on board, Israel released the vessel and its crew, and the Klos C returned to service.

A UN expert panel later concluded that, while the shipment came from Iran, it was headed for Sudan rather than the Gaza Strip. The United States also had plans to intercept the vessel.
