= Chong Chon Gang =

North Korean cargo ship

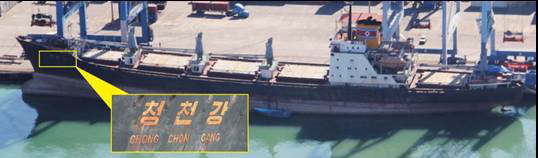

History
- Name: 1977-2014 Chong Chon Gang 2014-present Tong Hung San
- Namesake: Ch'ongch'on River
- Owner: Chongchongang Shipping (2013)
- Operator: Chongchongang Shipping (2013)
- Port of registry: Nampo, North Korea
- Builder: Nampo Shipyard
- In service: 1977
- Identification: IMO number: 7937317

General characteristics
- Type: General cargo ship
- Tonnage: 9,147 GT
- Length: 155 m (509 ft)
- Beam: 20 m (66 ft)
- Draft: 8.9 m (29 ft)
- Crew: 35

Chong Chon Gang (Korean: 청천강호; Hanja: 淸川江號) is a North Korean cargo ship, later renamed the Tong Hung San.

The 155 m (509 ft) general cargo ship was built in 1977 in Nampo. Its owner is listed as Chongchongang Shipping of Pyongyang. Chongchongang Shipping may be a front company answering to "Office #39" (otherwise known as the Central Committee Bureau 39) of the Workers' Party of Korea (WPK), which is responsible for state-sanctioned illicit activities such as the smuggling of prohibited items including weapons and luxury goods. Office #39 was created in 1974 as a department-level organization within the WPK Secretariat under the WPK Central Committee. According to a study published by the US Strategic Studies Institute, its primary role was and still is engaging in illegal activities in order to generate hard currency for the North Korean government.

== History ==
On 11 March 2009, Chong Chon Gang was chased by Somali pirates in the Arabian Sea. Pirates shot bullets and an RPG from a speedboat, which damaged the ship and injured two crew members. After the attack, the ship caught the attention of maritime officials when it made a stop at the Russian naval facility in Tartus, Syria. It is unknown why it was there.

=== Detentions ===
On 26 February 2003, Iran detained Chong Chon Gang at Bandar Imam Khomeini.

In February 2010, Ukrainian authorities detained the ship at Oktyabrsk Port, Mykolaiv. It was carrying a heroin substitute, alcohol, cigarettes, and AK-47 ammunition.

In March 2010, Egypt charged that the vessel was carrying "dangerous goods".

From April 12, 2013, to July 11 the Chong Chon Gang sent irregular signals to the Automatic Identification System. This and "unspecified" intelligence prompted Panamanian officials to seize the ship on 15 July at Manzanillo International Terminal. Reportedly, when Panamanian troops approached the ship, its crew responded violently and the captain later attempted to kill himself. A reported missile was found buried in a cargo of 250,000 bags of brown sugar, resulting in the vessel's seizure. It was reportedly on its way from Cuba to North Korea. As of July 2013, only two of the several cargo compartments had been inspected. North Korea has yet to comment, while Cuba stated that the "obsolete weapons" on the ship were going to North Korea for repair. These weapons included two anti-aircraft missile batteries, nine air defense missiles in parts, two Mikoyan-Gurevich MiG-21 fighter planes, and 15 engines for them. All the weapons aboard were originally manufactured in the Soviet Union and dated to the mid-20th century.

The Red Cross stated that "[the crew members] are OK. They are all calm,". Panama expelled most of the ship's 35-man crew to Cuba and other countries on 30 January 2014. The captain and two other officers were kept in Panama to face charges of arms smuggling. The North Korean government paid a fine of US$700,000 for the release of the vessel.

=== Subsequent developments ===
In October 2014 the Chong Chon Gang was transferred to another North Korean owner, Tonghunsan Shipping Company, and renamed Tong Hun San.

== See also ==
- Annie Larsen affair
- Boka Star
- MV Francop
- Victoria Affair
- List of North Korean merchant ships
