= Karine A affair =

2002 Israeli military action

- Part of the Second Intifada
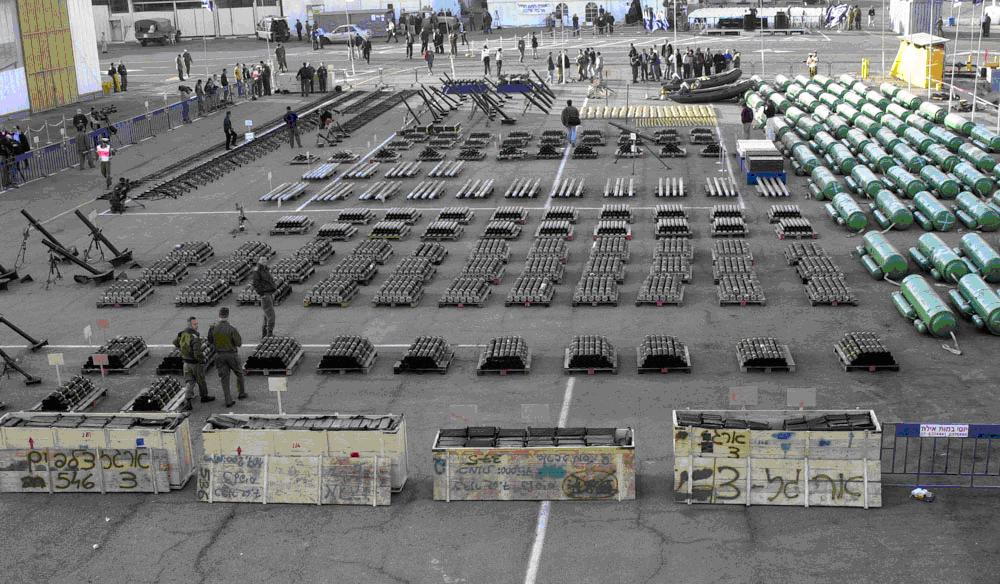
- Military equipment confiscated from MV Karine A
- Planned by: Israeli Navy
- Objective: Seizure of MV Karine A
- Date: January 3, 2002; 24 years ago
- Executed by: Shayetet 13
- Outcome: Success

The Karine A affair, also known as Operation "Noah's Ark" (Hebrew: מבצע תיבת נוח, romanized: Mivtza Teyvat Noah), was an Israeli military action in January 2002 in which the Israel Defense Forces (IDF) forces seized MV Karine A, which was a Palestinian freighter in the Red Sea. The vessel was reported by the IDF to be carrying 50 tons of weapons, including short-range Katyusha rockets, antitank missiles, and high explosives.

== Background ==
Prior investigation had revealed that the captain of the vessel was Colonel Omar Akawi, a Fatah activist since 1976 and former member of the Palestinian Authority. According to Lloyd's List, which tracks worldwide shipping records, the ship was purchased on August 31, 2001, from a Lebanese company by the Palestinian Authority, under the name of Adel Mughrabi. The alleged purchaser of the weapons, Mughrabi (aka Adel Salameh), was a former member of Yassir Arafat's staff until the early 1980s "when he was dismissed for conducting private business which conflicted with his official status".

From October 2000, Mughrabi was in contact with the Iranians and Hezbollah. Mughrabi was one of the key contacts in Palestinian weapons procurement. He was supported by the Palestinian Naval Police Commander Juma'a Ghali and his executive Fathi Ghazem. Their objective was to sneak in a great amount of weapons for the use of the Palestinian Authority. This particular operation included the purchase and facilitating of ships, forming of a sailing crew, planning on how to store and hide the weapons, the loading of the weapons into the vessels, and the transit of it until delivered to the Palestinian Authority.

The ship was then sailed to Sudan, where it was loaded with regular cargo and the crew was switched with Palestinian Authority personnel. It was renamed from Rim K to Karine A when it was registered in Tonga on September 12. During November 2001, they sailed to the Hodeida port in Yemen. Afterwards, the ship was loaded with weapons by the Iranians and the Hezbollah; while in transit, it was manned by personnel of the Palestinian Authority. The objective was to transport the weapons to the Palestinian Naval Police near the Gaza beaches.

During December 2001, Mughrabi gave the ship detailed instructions to sail to the beaches of Qeshm Island, Iran. There a ferry approached it—most likely from Iran. This ferry contained the weapons stored in 80 large wooden crates, which were transferred onto the ship. The personnel of the ship then placed these weapons in special waterproof containers—which were produced only in Iran. These containers are floatable and have a configurable system that determines how deep they are submerged.

When the loading was completed the ship needed to alter its heading towards the Hodeida port, due to technical problems. After the ship crossed the canal it was expected to meet with three smaller ships and to transfer the load onto them—these smaller ships were purchased in advance. They were then supposed to drop the weapons near El Arish, Egypt. The commander of the Palestinian Naval Police, Juma'a Ghali and his executive Fathi Ghazem, would then collect the weapons there.

== Shipment ==
The ship itself was worth an estimated $400,000, the civilian cargo used to conceal the weapons approximately $3,000,000, and the weapons were estimated at a value of approximately $15,000,000. The shipment included the following weapons:

- 122 mm Katyusha rockets
- 107 mm Katyusha rockets
- 80 mm mortar shells
- 120 mm mortar shells
- Anti-tank missiles
- Anti-tank mines
- Sniper rifles
- AK-47 ("Kalashnikov") assault rifles
- Ammunition
- Two and a half tons of high explosives

Ashkelon and other coastal cities would have been threatened by these Katyusha rockets if they had reached Gaza. The Ben-Gurion International Airport and various major Israeli cities would also have been within the range of these rockets if they were situated in the West Bank. The shipment additionally included rubber boats and diving equipment. This equipment could have facilitated seaborne attacks from Gaza against the coastal cities.

Major General Yedidya Ya'ari, the commander of the Israeli Navy, reported that the weapons and equipment were packed in 83 crates, in waterproof plastic and attached to buoys, to permit their drop-off and retrieval at sea.

== Interception ==
The mission began at 04:45 on January 3, 2002, in the Red Sea, 500 kilometres (311 mi) from Israel. The ship was sailing in international waters on its way to the Suez Canal. Israeli Navy commandos, backed by combat helicopters and aircraft, surprised the crew and took over the vessel without firing a shot. The ship was taken to Eilat the night of January 4.

Major General Shaul Mofaz, chief of staff of the IDF, announced in a Tel Aviv news conference on January 4 that the IDF had seized the ship while General Anthony Zinni was meeting with Yasser Arafat to promote negotiations between Israel and the Palestinian Authority.

== Aftermath ==
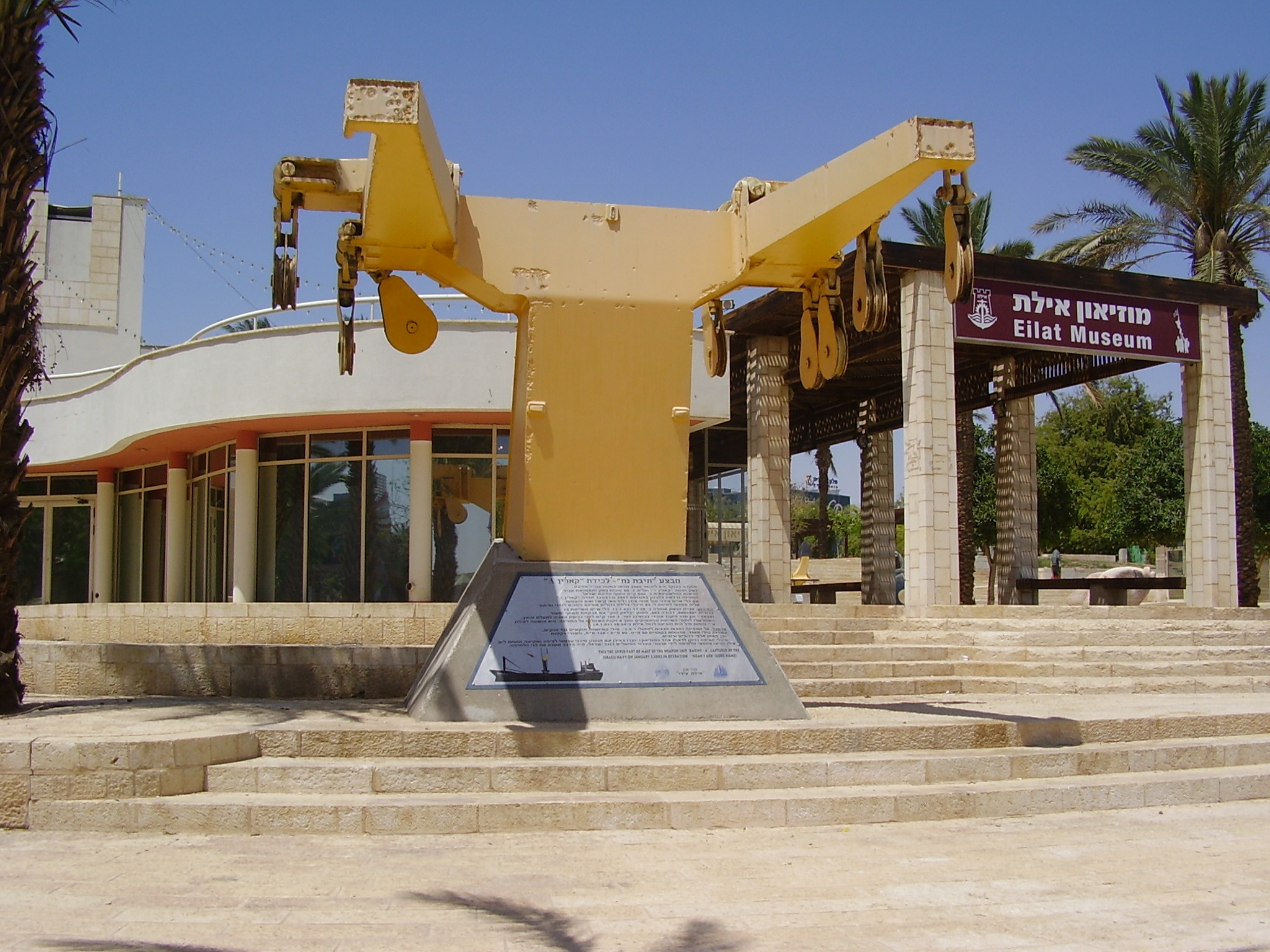
Upper part of the mast of the weapons ship Karine A, captured by the Israeli navy

Israel and the United States alleged Hezbollah had some link to the Palestinian weapons ship seized by Israel. Three Hezbollah members arrested in Jordan were attempting to smuggle Katyusha rockets to the Palestinians (the detainees were later freed by the Jordanians at the request of the Lebanese government). Another fishing vessel carrying weapons to the Palestinians was sunk off the Lebanese coast by Israel in May 2002. Israel charged that the weapons and military cargo were purchased with the help of Hezbollah. Hezbollah rejected accusations of involvement in arms shipment. Israeli reports stated that the ship, purchased from Lebanon, had loaded weapons at the Iranian island of Kish in the middle of the night off the coast of Iran. It had then sailed through the Gulf of Oman, the Arabian Sea, the Gulf of Aden, and the Red Sea.

Palestinian leader Yasser Arafat denied any involvement. While the IDF maintains that the weapons were bound for the PA, other sources have suggested that the weapons may instead have been headed to Lebanon for the use of the Islamic militant group Hezbollah. Some academics, such as Matthew Levitt, Anthony Cordesman and Efraim Karsh have also supported the view that the ship was smuggling Iranian weapons to the Palestinian Authority.

Israel subsequently arrested Fuad Shubaki, an Arafat aide who was in charge of finances in the PA and, as such, the mastermind behind the operation. He was charged with arms dealing and establishing connections with a foreign agent, for his role in financing the weapons ship. In 2006, Shubaki was taken into custody after an IDF raid on the Jericho prison where he was being held together with Ahmed Sa'adat—the leader of the Popular Front for the Liberation of Palestine. They were held together with other assassins of the former tourism minister Rehavam Ze'evi. Israel's prosecutor demanded that Shubaki must be sent to 25 years in prison, referring to the severity of his crimes. The court decided that Shubaki should be sentenced to a reduced sentence, keeping in mind his high age and health problems. Shubaki was convicted and sentenced to 20 years in jail.

After his arrest in 2006, Shubaki told the Israelis that the PA funded terror cells such as his. He estimated that between $7 and $10 million was used every two years to purchase arms for the Gaza Strip. Additionally, another $2 million was spent on weapons for the West Bank. According to Shubaki the money came from both international aid to the PA, tax money Israel routinely transferred to the PA, and taxes collected from the Gaza Strip. He also confessed to his relationship in the purchasing of weapons for the head of the Tanzim terror group in Gaza. The Tanzim group was known for their attacks against military installations and Israeli settlements in the Gaza Strip.

The smuggling attempt violated agreements between the Palestinian Authority and Israel. These agreements state the amount and type of weapons that the Palestinian Authority is permitted to possess.

Mohammad Javad Zarif argues that Arafat and Fatah were not allies with Iran at the time, asserting that Arafat was not allowed to meet with Ayatollah Khamenei during his stay in Tehran before this incident during the Organisation of Islamic Cooperation conference.

=== Diplomatic aftermath ===
United States president George W. Bush felt personally betrayed by Arafat, when he had evidence that "top Palestinian officials" were involved with the Karine A, but Arafat sent a letter to Bush "denying any Palestinian involvement". According to Bush: "Arafat had lied to me. I never trusted him again. In fact, I never spoke to him again. By the spring of 2002, I had concluded that peace would not be possible with Arafat in power."

According to Douglas Feith, the Karine A episode hardened Vice President Dick Cheney's opinions of Yasser Arafat and convinced him that Arafat "was part of the global terrorist network."

Tonga soon suspended its international ship registry but later reinstated it.

Palestinian scholar Edward Said commented, "it needs to be said that PLO handling of the Karine A incident has been incompetent and bungling beyond even its own poor standards"

A book entitled A Raid on the Red Sea: The Israeli Capture of the Karine A by Amos Gilboa, edited and translated by Yonah Jeremy Bob was published in 2021.

== See also ==
Similar weapons seizures from vessels en route:

- Operation "Four Species" (Francop affair)
- Victoria affair
- 2010 Gaza flotilla raid
- KLOS C affair
