= Jens Meyer =

German politician (born 1971)

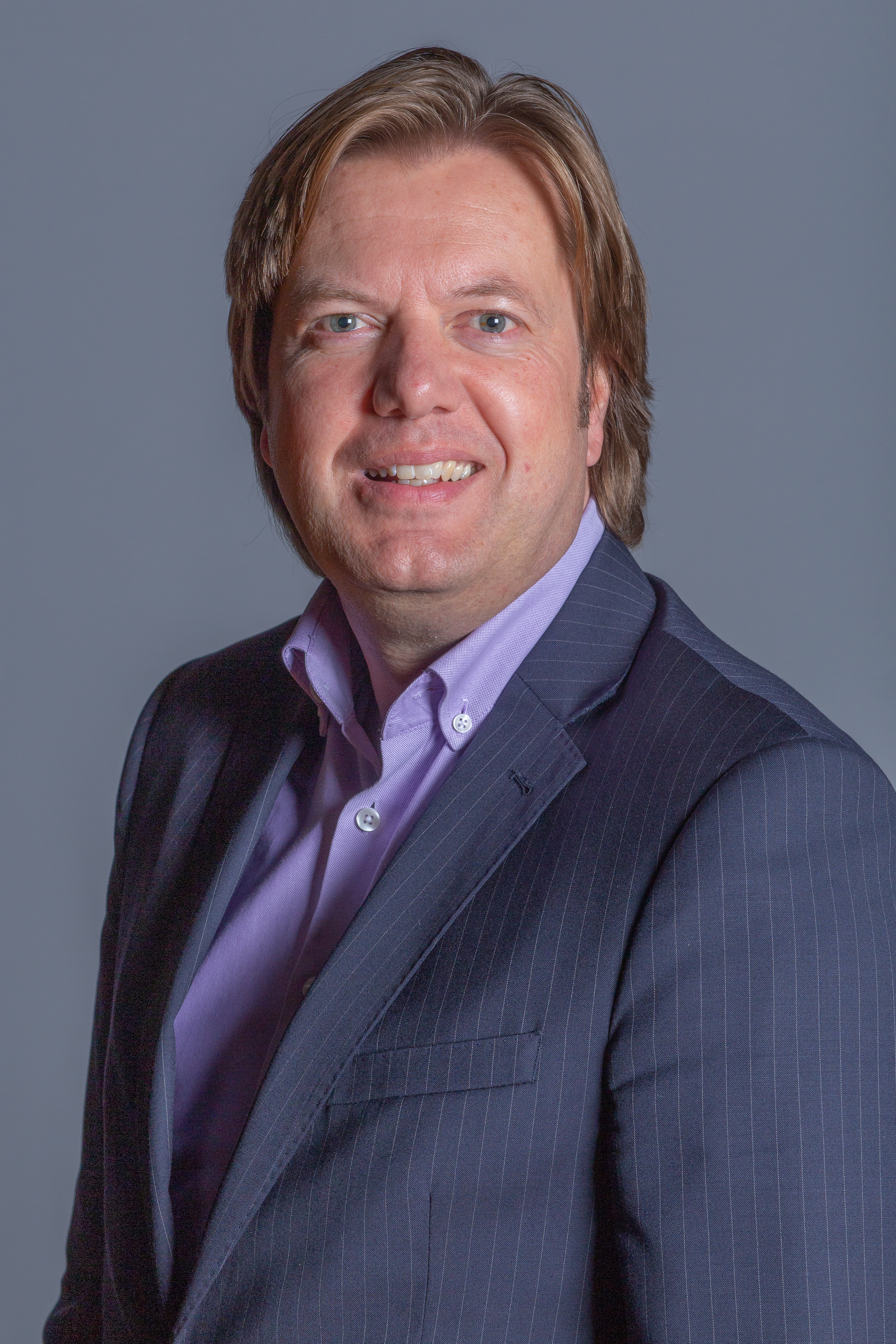
Jens P. Meyer 2018

Jens P. Meyer (born 3 February 1971 in Bielefeld) is a German politician. He has been a member of the Hamburg Parliament since 2015.

== Biography ==
Jens Meyer grew up in East Westphalia, Germany. He attended Pelizaeus-Gymnasium Paderborn, graduating in 1990. Following graduation, he served in the German army at NATO headquarters BALTAP for two years.

From 1992 till 1996 he studied architecture at the University of Applied Sciences and Arts at Lübeck. He also attended the University of Fine Arts, Hamburg. Following graduation he began work as an architect. Since 2000 he has worked as a freelance architect.

In 2004 Meyer became a member of the Free Democratic Party. From 2008 till 2014 he was a member of the district's assembly of Eimsbüttel in Hamburg as well as the deputy chairman of his party's faction. The main focuses of his political agenda are urban planning and cultural heritage management.

Since the 2015 Hamburg state election Meyer has been a member of the Hamburg Parliament, where he is a member of the Constitutional Affairs Committee, the District Committee, the Urban Development Committee and the Culture Committee. Since 2015, he has also been a member of the local party executive committee in the District Eimsbüttel.
