= Yugoslav auxiliary Ugor =

History

SFR Yugoslavia
- Name: Ugor
- Namesake: Conger eel
- Builder: BSO Split
- Yard number: 517
- Completed: 1983
- Decommissioned: 1992
- Out of service: 1998
- Fate: Sold into merchant service

Montenegro
- Name: Kairos I; Boka Star; Star
- Out of service: 2002
- Identification: IMO number: 8929367
- Fate: Broken up 2012

General characteristics
- Displacement: 600 t (590 long tons) standard, 860 t (850 long tons) full load
- Length: 58.20 m (190 ft 11 in)
- Beam: 11.00 m (36 ft 1 in)
- Draught: 2.75 m (9 ft 0 in)
- Installed power: 2,600 kW (3,480 bhp)
- Propulsion: 2 shafts; 2 diesel engines
- Speed: 16 kn (30 km/h; 18 mph)
- Range: 1,500 nmi (2,800 km; 1,700 mi) at 16 kn (30 km/h; 18 mph)
- Capacity: 150 fully armed troops; Six tanks
- Complement: 43
- Armament: Guns and missiles: Missiles: 2 x MTU-4 Strela-2M 9K32 Strela-2 surface-to-air missile; 2 "Svitac" flare rocket lunchers; Guns: 1 20/4 M-75 20mm gun; 1 40mm Bofors L70 gun Autocannon

Ugor (PO-92) was a PO-class logistic transport ship of the Yugoslav Navy, built in 1983 and classed as an ammunition auxiliary. Later sold into merchant service, the ship traded under Montenegrin ownership with the names Kairos I and Boka Star. She was seized in 2002 by the Croatian authorities for arms smuggling and later demolished as Star.

== Characteristics ==
Ugor was 58.20 metres (190 ft 11 in) long, with a beam of 11.00 metres (36 ft 1 in) and a mean draught of 2.75 metres (9 ft 0 in). Displacement was 600 tonnes (590 long tons) standard and 860 tonnes (850 long tons) full load. Two B&W-Alpha diesel engines with a total rating of 2,600 kilowatts (3,480 bhp) drove two shafts, giving a speed of 16 knots (30 km/h; 18 mph). The ship had a range of 1,500 nautical miles (2,800 km; 1,700 mi) at 16 knots (30 km/h; 18 mph). The ship was of Ro-Ro configuration, fitted with a bow visor and bow ramp to aid loading and unloading of vehicles, and with two slewing cranes on the upper deck. The main cargo deck could accommodate up to six tanks, while 150 fully armed troops could be carried in addition to the ship's crew of 43.

== Naval service ==
Built in 1983, Ugor (PO-92) was the second ship, after Lubin (PO-91) and before Kit (PO-93), in a class of three small multi-role transport ships, known as the Lubin class by NATO. Designed by Brodoprojekt Rijeka, she was built for the Yugoslav Navy as Yard No.517 at the BSO-Brodosplit shipyard, Split. Their primary function was the replenishing of warships of the Yugoslav Navy with weapons, and as such were designated PO (Serbian: Pomoćni oružar - Ammunition Auxiliary).

Following the breakup of Yugoslavia in 1991–1992, Ugor remained part of the Yugoslav Navy though, together with Lubin, the ship was laid up. In 1996 they were reported as transferred to Montenegro for scrapping or commercial use.

== Merchant service ==
In commercial service, she served under Montenegrin ownership, initially as Kairos I and from 1997 as Boka Star, initially under the Belize flag. After being re-flagged to Tonga in January 2002, and under the ownership of Shipstar Shipping Services, itself owned by a Montenegrin, Marko Balić, the ship was involved in an arms-smuggling controversy.

=== Seizure ===
On 22 October 2002, Boka Star was seized by Croatian authorities at the port of Rijeka, following a tip-off from American intelligence, on suspicion that the ship was being used for arms smuggling. The ship's cargo, loaded at Bar, Montenegro, included 14 transport containers of chemical pellets, declared as activated carbon and water filters, which was in fact 208,337 kilograms (459,304 lb) of explosives, consisting of nitrocellulose and nitroglycerin. The captain and chief officer of Boka Star were acquitted, but Balić was found guilty in absentia of smuggling arms and issuing forged documents, and sentenced to six years in prison. Following his arrest in Greece and appeal to the Croatian Supreme Court in 2014, he was released from prison and his previous sentence was dismissed as the original judgement was ruled to be invalid. The charges were reduced to those of a customs violation and he is awaiting retrial.

=== Sale ===
The ship was sold by Balić in 2003 to the Esprite Shipping Corporation, based in the Marshall Islands, but the continuing legal proceedings resulted in the ship being kept under control of the court and being towed to Pula military port. Eventually, in 2011, Boka Star was sold at auction to the Croatian company Splitska Plovibda, but resold for scrapping in Aliağa, Turkey as the Togo-flagged Star in February 2012.
