= Bow visor =

Bow arrangement

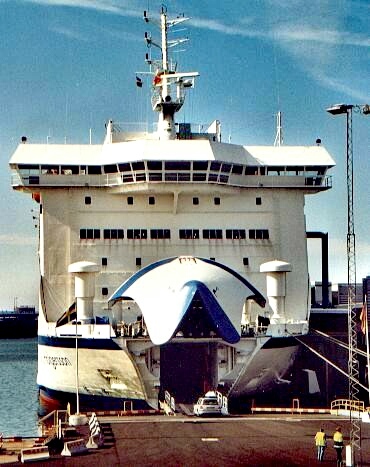
Loading a roll-on/roll-off passenger car ferry

A bow visor is a feature of some ships, in particular ferries and roll-on/roll-off ships, that allows the bow to articulate up and down, providing access to the cargo ramp and storage deck near the water line.

In modern ferry design over the last 45 years, bow visors have given way to clam doors. Instead of one large visor, two halves open horizontally to reveal the loading ramp and deck. These are believed to be safer than bow visor doors, as in a bow visor door, the forces acting on the door from the impact of the waves are absorbed by the hinges and locks, which may fail. With clam doors, the forces of the waves are absorbed by the surrounding bow superstructure. Furthermore, on seagoing vessels there should be inner bow doors or 'collision bulkhead doors' in place behind the loading ramp. These doors are an upper extension of the collision bulkhead and act as a secondary barrier against water entering the car deck, should the primary bow door(s) fail.

There have been several recorded incidents in which bow visors have partially opened whilst the ship was in motion, resulting in some ships having to have their visor locking mechanisms strengthened.

Bow visor failure has also directly caused the loss of some ships, such as the MS Estonia in 1994.
