= Latin America–North Korea relations =

Latin America

North Korea

Latin America–North Korea relations are relations between North Korea and the countries of Latin America.

== Overview ==
North Korea began diplomatic relations with Latin America in 1960 after establishing diplomatic ties with Cuba. From 1972 to 2007, North Korea further established diplomatic relations with more Latin American countries. Economic relations between North Korea and Latin America are limited due to sanctions on North Korea. North Korea's trade with Latin America reached $979 million in 2008 but had shrunk to $103 million in 2016.

== Relations with Latin American countries ==
Country	Formal relations began	Notes
Argentina	1 June 1973 (suspended)	See Argentina–North Korea relations: Diplomatic relations were established on 1 June 1973 and were severed on 14 June 1977.; Argentina does not have an embassy in Pyongyang.; North Korea does not have an embassy in Buenos Aires. The Embassy of North Korea in Buenos Aires was established in 1973 and closed in 1977 due to diplomatic relations being severed.
Bolivia	None	See Bolivia–North Korea relations: Bolivia does not have an embassy in Pyongyang.; North Korea does not have an embassy in La Paz.
Brazil	9 March 2001	See Brazil–North Korea relations: Brazil has an embassy in Pyongyang.; North Korea has an embassy in Brasília.
Chile	1 June 1972	See Chile–North Korea relations: Chile does not have an embassy in Pyongyang.; North Korea does not have an embassy in Santiago. The Embassy of North Korea in Santiago was closed in 1973.
Colombia	24 October 1988	See Colombia–North Korea relations: Colombia does not have an embassy in Pyongyang.; North Korea does not have an embassy in Bogotá.
Costa Rica	10 February 1974 (suspended)	See Costa Rica–North Korea relations: Diplomatic relations were established on 10 February 1974 and were severed on 2 December 1983.; Costa Rica does not have an embassy in Pyongyang.; North Korea does not have an embassy in San José.
Cuba	29 August 1960	See Cuba–North Korea relations: Cuba has an embassy in Pyongyang.; North Korea has an embassy in Havana.
Dominican Republic	24 September 2007	See Dominican Republic–North Korea relations: Dominican Republic does not have an embassy in Pyongyang.; North Korea does not have an embassy in Santo Domingo.
Ecuador	None	See Ecuador–North Korea relations: Ecuador does not have an embassy in Pyongyang.; North Korea does not have an embassy in Quito.
El Salvador	None	See El Salvador–North Korea relations: El Salvador does not have an embassy in Pyongyang.; North Korea does not have an embassy in San Salvador.
Guatemala	26 September 2007	See Guatemala–North Korea relations: Guatemala does not have an embassy in Pyongyang.; North Korea does not have an embassy in Guatemala City.
Honduras	None	See Honduras–North Korea relations: Honduras does not have an embassy in Pyongyang.; North Korea does not have an embassy in Tegucigalpa.
Mexico	9 September 1980	See Mexico–North Korea relations: Mexico does not have an embassy in Pyongyang. Mexico is accredited to North Korea from its embassy in Seoul, South Korea.; North Korea has an embassy in Mexico City.
Nicaragua	21 August 1979	See Nicaragua–North Korea relations: Nicaragua has an embassy in Pyongyang.; North Korea does not have an embassy in Managua. The Embassy of North Korea in Managua was closed in 1995.
Panama	None	See North Korea–Panama relations: North Korea does not have an embassy in Panama City.; Panama does not have an embassy in Pyongyang.
Paraguay	None	See North Korea–Paraguay relations: North Korea does not have an embassy in Asunción.; Paraguay does not have an embassy in Pyongyang.
Peru	15 December 1988	See North Korea–Peru relations: North Korea does not have an embassy in Lima. The Embassy of North Korea in Lima was closed in 2017.; Peru has an embassy in Pyongyang.
Uruguay	None	See North Korea–Uruguay relations: North Korea does not have an embassy in Montevideo.; Uruguay does not have an embassy in Pyongyang.
Venezuela	28 October 1974	See North Korea–Venezuela relations: North Korea has an embassy in Caracas.; Venezuela has an embassy in Pyongyang.

== See also ==
- Foreign relations of North Korea
- Latin America–South Korea relations
- Forum of East Asia–Latin America Cooperation
