= Latin America–South Korea relations =

Latin America–South Korea relations relations
- South Korea: Latin America

Latin America–South Korea relations are relations between South Korea and the countries of Latin America.

== Overview ==
South Korea began diplomatic relations with Latin America in 1959 after establishing diplomatic ties with Brazil. After establishing diplomatic relations with Cuba in 2024, South Korea established diplomatic relations with all Latin American countries. Entering the 21st century, cooperation in various fields such as human and cultural exchanges between Korea and Latin America has been further strengthened.

== Relations with Latin American countries ==
Country	Formal relations began	Notes
Argentina	15 February 1962	See Argentina–South Korea relations: Argentina has an embassy in Seoul.; South Korea has an embassy in Buenos Aires.
Bolivia	25 April 1965	See Bolivia–South Korea relations: Bolivia has an embassy in Seoul.; South Korea has an embassy in La Paz.
Brazil	31 October 1959	See Brazil–South Korea relations: Brazil has an embassy in Seoul.; South Korea has an embassy in Brasília.; In 2006, South Korea's export in Brazil was 3.06 billion US dollars.
Chile	18 April 1962	See Chile–South Korea relations: Chile has an embassy in Seoul.; South Korea has an embassy in Santiago.; Chile has a Working Holiday Program Agreement with South Korea; Chile–South Korea Free Trade Agreement.
Colombia	10 March 1962	See Colombia–South Korea relations: Formal diplomatic relations started on March 10, 1962.; Colombia has an embassy in Seoul.; South Korea has an embassy in Bogotá.; Colombia sent more than 1,000 men to help South Korea during the Korean War.; Colombian Ministry of Foreign Relations: direction of Colombian representation in South Korea
Costa Rica	15 August 1962	See Costa Rica–South Korea relations: Costa Rica has an embassy in Seoul.; South Korea has an embassy in San José.
Cuba	14 February 2024	See Cuba–South Korea relations: Diplomatic relations were established on 14 February 2024.; Cuba has an embassy in Seoul.; South Korea has an embassy in Havana.
Dominican Republic	6 June 1962	See Dominican Republic–South Korea relations: Dominican Republic has an embassy in Seoul.; South Korea has an embassy in Santo Domingo.
Ecuador	5 October 1962	See Ecuador–South Korea relations: Ecuador has an embassy in Seoul.; South Korea has an embassy in Quito.
El Salvador	30 August 1962	See El Salvador–South Korea relations: El Salvador has an embassy in Seoul.; South Korea has an embassy in San Salvador.
Guatemala	24 October 1962	See Guatemala–South Korea relations: Guatemala has an embassy in Seoul.; South Korea has an embassy in Guatemala City.
Honduras	1 April 1962	See Honduras–South Korea relations: Honduras has an embassy in Seoul.; South Korea has an embassy in Tegucigalpa.
Mexico	26 January 1962	See Mexico–South Korea relations: The establishment of diplomatic relations between Mexico and South Korea started on 26 January 1962.; Mexico has an embassy in Seoul.; South Korea has an embassy in Mexico City.; Mexico has a Working Holiday Program Agreement with South Korea
Nicaragua	26 January 1962	See Nicaragua–South Korea relations: Nicaragua does not have an embassy in Seoul. The Nicaraguan embassy first closed in May 1997. It reopened in October 2014 and closed for a second time in April 2024. Nicaragua is accredited to South Korea from its Permanent Mission of Nicaragua to the United Nations in New York City, United States.; South Korea has an embassy in Managua.
Panama	30 September 1962	See Panama–South Korea relations: Panama has an embassy in Seoul.; South Korea has an embassy in Panama City.
Paraguay	12 June 1962	See Paraguay–South Korea relations: Paraguay has an embassy in Seoul.; South Korea has an embassy in Asunción.; There are about 5,000 people of Korean descent living in Paraguay; Paraguayan gloria w/h Ministry of Foreign Relations about relations with Korea; South Korean Ministry of Foreign Affairs and Trade about relations with Paraguay
Peru	1 April 1963	See Peru–South Korea relations: Peru has an embassy in Seoul.; South Korea has an embassy in Lima.; There are about 900 people of Korean descent living in Peru (See also Korean Peruvian).; Peruvian Ministry of Foreign Relations about relations with Korea; South Korean Ministry of Foreign Affairs and Trade about relations with Peru; In June 1993, Peruvian President Alberto Fujimori visited South Korea.
Uruguay	7 October 1964	See South Korea–Uruguay relations: South Korea has an embassy in Montevideo.; Uruguay has an embassy in Seoul.; South Korean Ministry of Foreign Affairs and Trade about relations with Uruguay; In September 2008, Uruguayan President Tabaré Vázquez visited South Korea.
Venezuela	29 April 1965	See South Korea–Venezuela relations: South Korea has an embassy in Caracas.; Venezuela has an embassy in Seoul.

== See also ==
- Foreign relations of South Korea
- Indo-Pacific Strategy of South Korea
- Latin America–North Korea relations
- Forum of East Asia–Latin America Cooperation
