= Peru–South Korea relations =

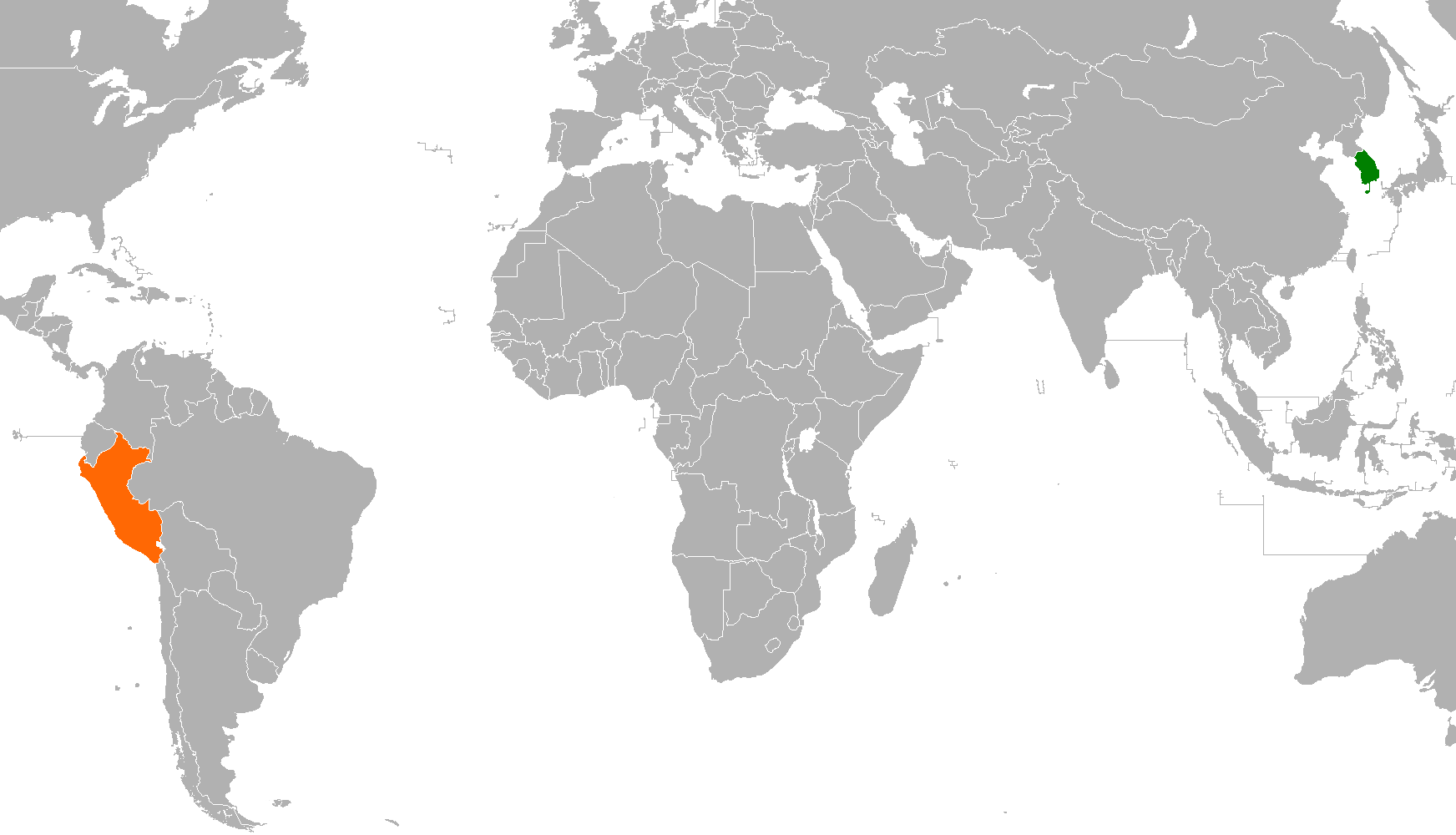
- South Korea: Peru

Diplomatic mission
- Embassy of South Korea, Lima: Embassy of Peru, Seoul

Peru–South Korea relations are the current and historical relations between the Republic of Korea and the Republic of Peru. Both countries are members of the United Nations and the Asia-Pacific Economic Cooperation, and have resident embassies in each other's capital cities.

As of 2021, South Koreans in Peru represent 0.1% of the foreign population of the country, with 1,995 citizens reported to live in the country.

== History ==
Peru and South Korea established relations on April 1, 1963. The Korean ambassador to Brazil was initially accredited to Peru, until an embassy in Lima was opened on August 1, 1971. During the internal conflict in Peru, the embassy was targeted on two occasions.

During the Japanese embassy hostage crisis, the Korean ambassador, Lee Won-young, was among the initial group of hostages held captive by the Túpac Amaru Revolutionary Movement armed group.

In 2023, Peru and Korea celebrated the 60th anniversary of the establishment of diplomatic relations.

== High-level visits ==
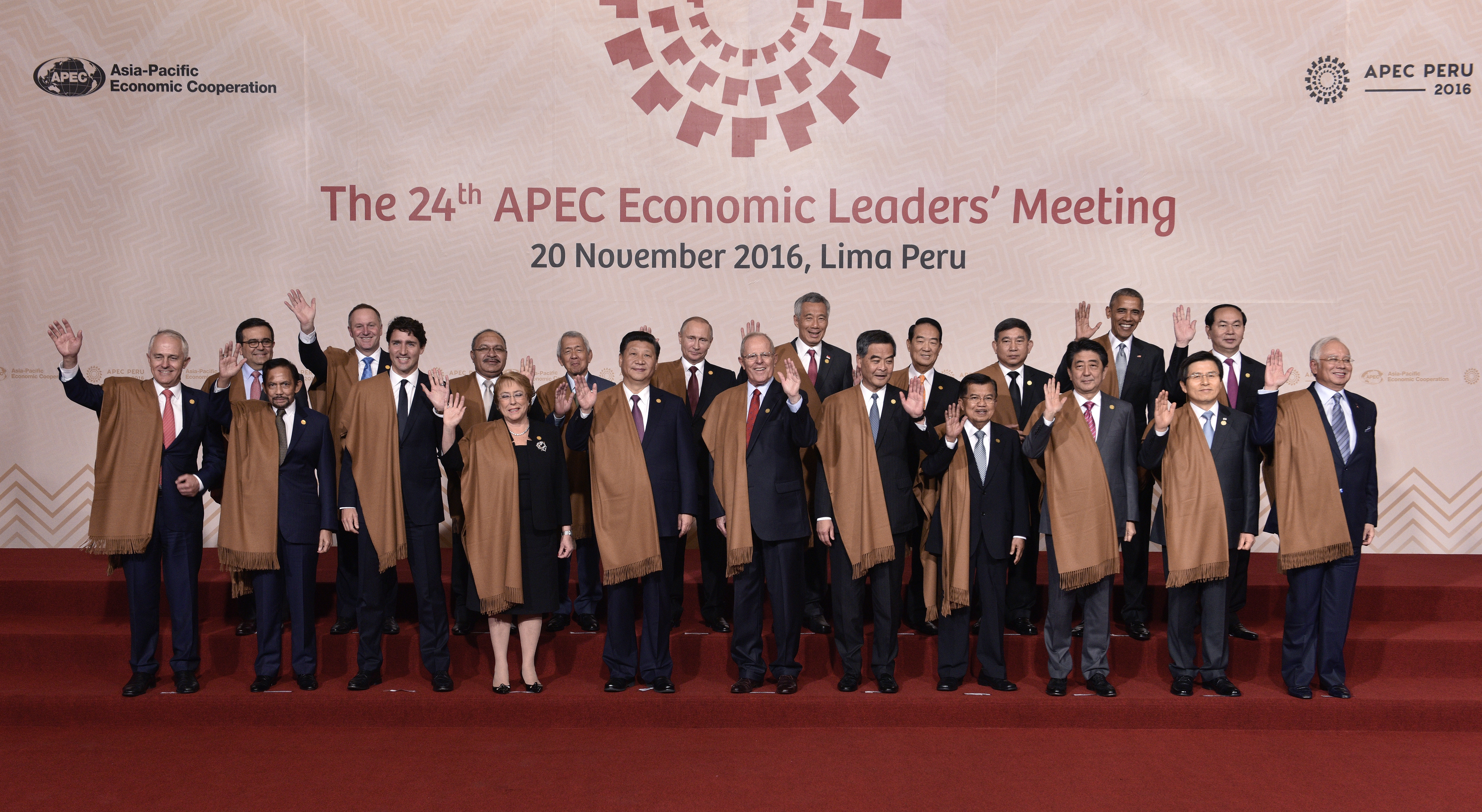
Korean Prime Minister Hwang Kyo-ahn attending the 28th APEC Summit hosted in Lima.

High-level visit from Korea to Peru

- President Park Geun-hye (2015)
- Prime Minister Hwang Kyo-ahn (2016)

High-level visit from Peru to Korea

- President Alberto Fujimori (1993)
- President Alan García (2010)
- President Ollanta Humala (2011)
- President Martín Vizcarra (2016)

== Trade ==
Peru and Korea signed a free trade agreement in 2011 that entered into force two years later on March 1, as well as a strategic alliance in 2012. The signing of the FTA led to a 7.1% increase in bilateral trade between both states, reaching a total of US$ 2,780 million. South Korea is one of the top 10 supplier markets in Peru.

Peru is one of many countries where South Korean culture has experienced a surge of popularity, and thus at least twenty Korean restaurants have opened in Lima as a result, becoming popular among locals.

In 2023, Peru decided to import K808 White Tiger Armoured personnel carriers from South Korea, made by Hyundai Rotem.

== Resident diplomatic missions ==
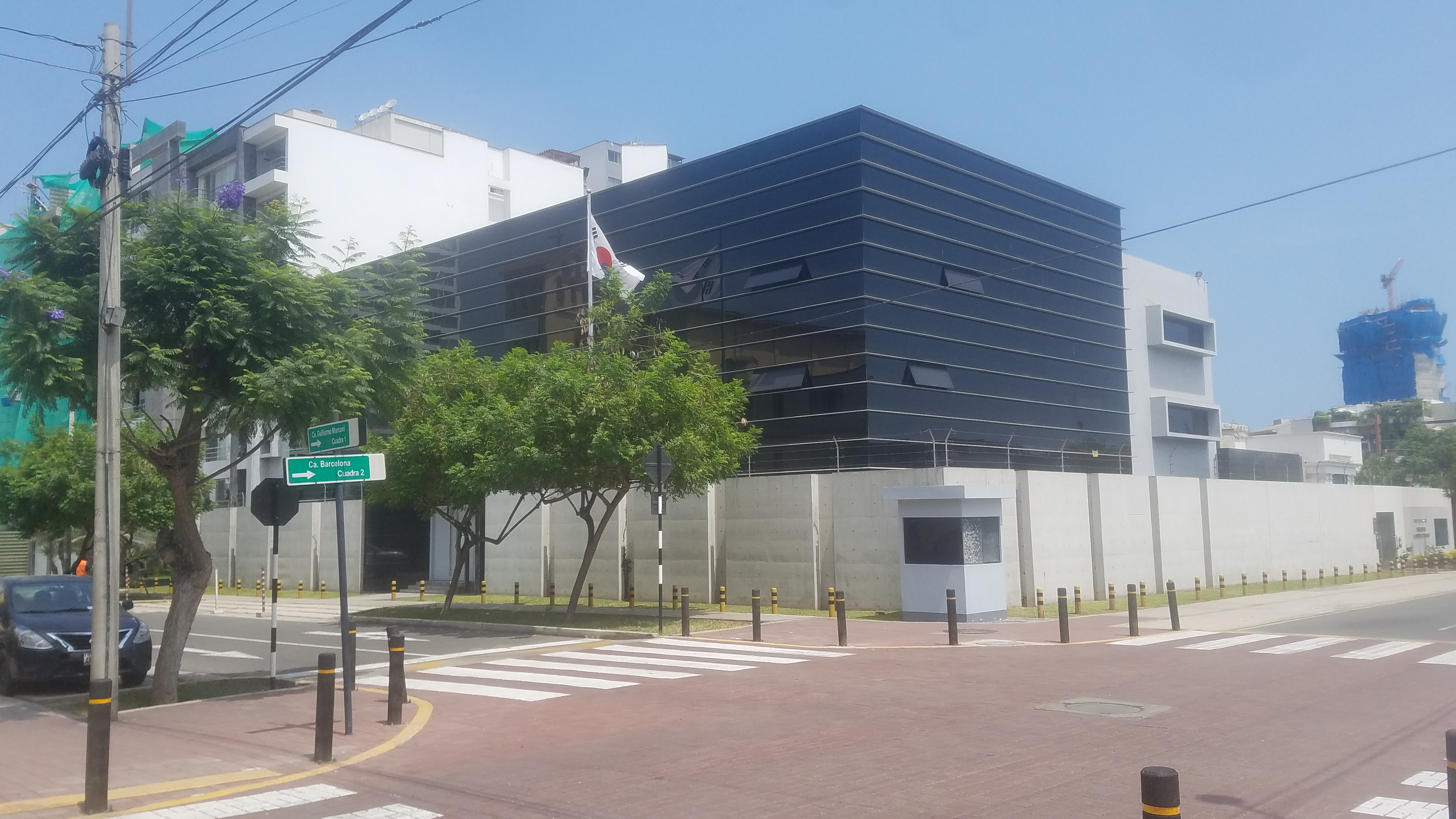
The South Korean embassy in Lima in 2023.

- South Korea has an embassy in Lima.
- Peru has an embassy in Seoul.

== See also ==
- Foreign relations of Peru
- Foreign relations of South Korea
- List of ambassadors of South Korea to Peru
- List of ambassadors of Peru to South Korea
- North Korea–Peru relations

== Bibliography ==
- Perú: Estadísticas de la Emigración Internacional de Peruanos e Inmigración de Extranjeros, 1990 – 2021 (PDF) (in Spanish). Lima: INEI. 2022.
