= Korea–Latin America relations =

Korea–Latin America relations may refer to:

- Latin America–North Korea relations
- Latin America–South Korea relations
