= Brazilians in South Korea =

Ethnic group in South Korea

Total population
- 1,088

Regions with significant populations
- Seoul

Languages
- Brazilian Portuguese · Korean

Related ethnic groups
- Brazilian diaspora, Korean Brazilians

There is a community of Brazilians in South Korea consisting of immigrants (mostly Korean Brazilian returnees) and expatriates (mostly footballers) from Brazil. In total there are estimated to be about 1,088 Brazilians living in South Korea.

== Migration history ==
=== Korean Brazilian returnees ===
Since the late 1980s, the economic situations of Korean Brazilians have slowly deteriorated. Many successful Koreans who accumulated sufficient wealth abandoned Brazil to look for economic opportunities elsewhere. Some non-affluent Koreans who failed to adjust to Brazilian society also did not find bright futures in Brazil. Some Korean immigrants in Brazil decided to return to their homeland, the economy of which has grown much faster than Brazil's since the 1980s. The early Korean immigrants who migrated as family units maintained strong ethnic consciousness. Thus, they were able to adapt to Korean society relatively easily when they returned to Korea.

Young Korean Brazilians who completed basic South Korean education in South Korea before moving to Brazil also did not encounter any difficulty in maintaining their Korean identity while living in Brazil thanks to the flexibility of Brazilian ethnic relations. However, second-generation Korean Brazilians did not develop clear ethnic identities in Brazil and had to work hard to be integrated into Korean society.

According to statistics of South Korea's Ministry of Justice, in 2009 a total of 77 Brazilians entered the country on overseas Korean (F-4) visas.

=== Expatriates ===
Brazilian expatriate footballers have been coming to South Korea to play for the K-League, the country's only fully professional association football league. At the inception of the K-League in 1983, only two Brazilian players made rosters. From 2000, Brazilian footballers became the K-League's priority with players such as André Luiz Tavares, João Soares da Mota Neto, Nádson Rodrigues de Souza, Adilson dos Santos, and Eduardo Gonçalves de Oliveira.

A few Brazilian students have also been awarded scholarships by companies such as Hyundai or public bodies such as South Korea's National Institute for International Education Development to study at universities in South Korea. Ministry of Justice statistics show a total of 34 Brazilians entering Korea in 2009 on student (D2) visas.

== Culture ==
Brazilian culture is also present in South Korea. The Embassy of Brazil in Seoul held a series of cultural events in 2009 such as music concerts and Brazilian film festival to mark the 50th anniversary of the establishment of diplomatic ties between South Korea and Brazil as well as in May 2012 with a Brazilian Cultural Programme titled "Seoul of Brazil", a three-day event which marks the 50th anniversary of Korean immigration to Brazil.

== See also ==
- Brazil–South Korea relations
- Brazilians in Japan
- Korean Brazilians
