= Korean Brazilians =

Brazilians of Korean birth or descent

Coreano-brasileiro 한국계 브라질인

Total population
- 50,000-70,000

Regions with significant populations
- Foz do Iguaçu, Fortaleza, and São Paulo City

Languages
- Brazilian Portuguese and Korean

Religion
- Protestantism, Catholicism, Buddhism

Related ethnic groups
- Other Korean and Brazilian people, Korean Americans and other Asian Brazilians

Korean Brazilians (Portuguese: coreano-brasileiro, Korean: 한국계 브라질인; Hanja: 韓國系 브라질人) are Brazilians of full, partial or predominantly Korean ancestry or a Korean-born person residing in Brazil. The Korean population in Brazil, the largest in South America, is about 50,000.

On 6 January 2010, per Municipal Law no. 15100, the São Paulo City Council officially recognised Bom Retiro as the Korean cultural neighbourhood.

In terms of religion, the vast majority of Korean Brazilians are Protestant, with a minority of Catholics. There are more Korean churches than Korean restaurants in the Korean Brazilian community. There are also three Buddhist temples located in Korean communities in Brazil, which also attract non-Korean worshippers. Since the 1990s, a net overall return migration pattern has evolved of Korean and Japanese Brazilians back to Korea and Japan, respectively.

== History ==
There were cases of Koreans immigrating to Brazil during the Japanese occupation of Korea such as Kim Soo Jo. In 1961, the Korean-Brazilian association made a deal to take Korean immigrants and the Korean-Brazilian cultural diplomatic group surveyed possible locations that would fit the Koreans. Official agricultural immigration from South Korea to Brazil began in 1962, and the early Korean people who immigrated to Brazil were helped by anti-communist political prisoners. Korean immigrants soon abandoned their agricultural projects and moved to São Paulo, mainly to Bom Retiro, which was originally a Jewish area but became one of the centers of Korean residents. Most of the Korean residents began to work in the clothing industry. In 1976, the South Korean government built the "Cross saemaul farm" near Brasília to solve the illegal Korean immigrants problem in Brazil. The Korean community was influenced by the 1994 economic policy Plano Real.

== Culture ==
=== Newspapers ===
Before 1985, daily newspapers existed such as the Hankook Daily or Chosun Daily, but these early newspapers ended up being a republishing of already existing Korean articles from South Korea. In 1985, the first Korean tabloid magazine Newsbrazil (published until 2011) was founded by Kim Jong Nam. The magazine helped the Korean-Brazilians, who were often illiterate in Portuguese, understand local economic policies and ads were placed. It also played as a role as a communication space.

== Education ==
Colégio Polilogos (브라질한국학교), a South Korean international school, was located in Bom Retiro, São Paulo.

== Notable persons ==
- Angela Park, LPGA golfer (South Korean parents)
- Francisco Hyun-sol Kim, professional footballer (South Korean parents)
- Chyung Eun-ju, beauty pageant titleholder, model, student and TV presenter (Originally from Seoul, South Korea)
- Catharina Choi Nunes, Miss Korea 2013 second runner-up, Miss Earth Fire 2013, Miss World Brazil 2015 (Korean Brazilian mother)
- Iara Lee, filmmaker (Korean descent)
- Jibeen, member of Korean boy group ARrC
- Jung Mo Sung, liberation theologian (Originally from Seoul, South Korea)
- Kim Yun-sik, South Korean hapkido and taekwondo grandmaster, founder of Bum Moo Kwan Hapkido (Originally from Seoul, South Korea)
- Yoo Na Kim, journalist, writer (Originally from Seoul, South Korea)
- Pyong Lee, YouTuber, illusionist, hypnologist (South Korean father)
- Juliano Son, singer and worship minister (South Korean parents)

== See also ==
- Brazil–North Korea relations
- Brazil–South Korea relations
- Immigration to Brazil
- Asian Brazilians
- Korean diaspora
- Chinese Brazilians
- Japanese Brazilians
