= Boycott olympics =

Boycott Olympics may refer to:

- Olympic boycotts, generally
- African boycott of the 1976 Summer Olympics
- 1980 Summer Olympics boycott
- 1984 Summer Olympics boycott
