= Embassy of Brazil, Pyongyang =

Brazilian embassy to North Korea in Pyongyang

Brazilian Embassy in Pyongyang Embaixada do Brasil em Pyongyang
- Location: (North Korea) Munsudong, Taedongkang District, Pyongyang
- Coordinates: 39°1′14.96″N 125°47′19.47″E
- Opening: 2009
- Website: www.brazil-embassy.net/br/Brazil-in-Pyongyang

The Brazilian Embassy in Pyongyang (Portuguese: Embaixada do Brasil em Pyongyang) is the diplomatic mission of Brazil to North Korea. It is located in Munsudong, Taedongkang District, Pyongyang. The current chargé d'affaires is Luís Felipe Silvério Fortuna.

== History ==
The Brazilian embassy in Pyongyang opened in May 2009. Since 2016 the embassy has been staffed by a chargé d'affaires instead of an Ambassador.

== See also ==
- List of diplomatic missions of Brazil
- List of diplomatic missions in North Korea
