= 1988 Summer Olympics boycott =

Sport boycott

- Part of the Olympic Games boycotts
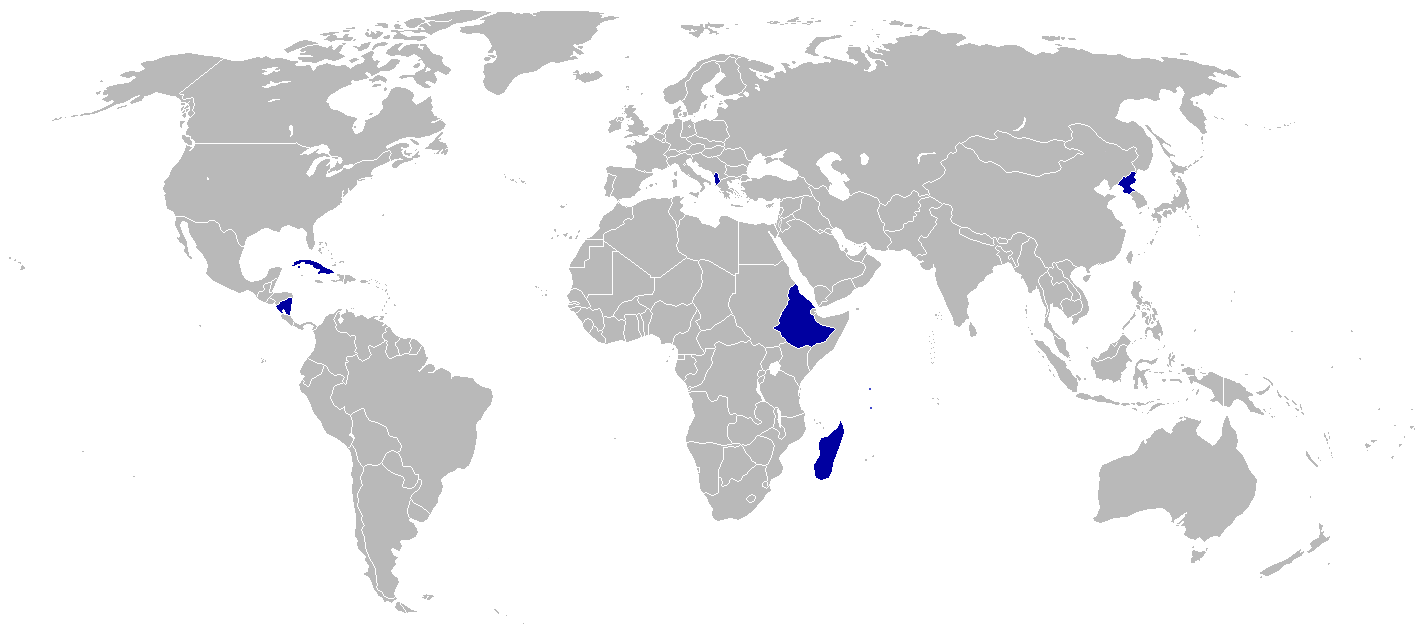
- The seven countries which boycotted the 1988 Games are shaded blue
- Date: September 17 – October 2, 1988 (38 years ago)
- Location: Games of the XXIV Olympiad; Seoul, South Korea
- Caused by: Korean conflict; Isolationist policies (Albania)
- Methods: Boycott

Parties
| Boycotting countries; Supporting North Korea; North Korea; Cuba; (People's Democratic Republic of Ethiopia) Ethiopia; Madagascar; Nicaragua; Undeclared reasons; Albania; Seychelles | Host country: South Korea; NGOs; IOC; (Seoul) SLOOC; (South Korea) KASA; (North Korea) OCDPRK |

Lead figures
| (North Korea) Kim Il Sung; (North Korea) Pak Song-chol; (North Korea) Kim Yu-sun (OCDPRK); (Cuba) Fidel Castro; (Cuba) M.G. Guerra (COC); (Ethiopia) Mengistu Haile Mariam; (Ethiopia) Tsegaw Ayele (EOC); (Madagascar) Didier Ratsiraka; (Nicaragua) Daniel Ortega; (Nicaragua) Moisés Hassan (NOC) | (South Korea) Chun Doo-hwan; (South Korea) Roh Tae-woo; (South Korea) Kim Jong-ha (KASA); (Seoul) Park Seh-jik (SLOOC); (International Olympic Committee) Juan Samaranch (IOC) |

Number
| Boycotting athletes: 320+ | |

The boycott of the 1988 Summer Olympic Games in Seoul followed four years after the Soviet-led boycott of the 1984 Summer Olympic Games in Los Angeles. The boycott involved seven socialist countries: North Korea and four of its allies, Cuba, Ethiopia, Nicaragua, and Madagascar, all of whom withdrew specifically in protest against North Korea's failure to secure a role as co-host of the Games; and the Seychelles and Albania, who did not offer reasons for their absence.

North Korea had sought a co-hosting role ever since Seoul was selected in 1981 as host city for the 1988 Summer Olympics, and to that end, the International Olympic Committee (IOC) and South Korea engaged the North in negotiations on the logistical matters involved in lending a minimum number of events from the Summer Games to North Korea. As negotiations wore on however—with the North vacillating on how many events they sought to co-host, and the IOC's receipt of private assurances of Soviet attendance—the IOC and South Korea found that they "needed talks more than they needed an agreement". That failure to secure an agreement prompted North Korea and four of its allies to boycott the Games.

Coming at a time during the waning years of the Cold War, the boycott represented a fracturing of the Eastern Bloc alliance, with a preponderance of Bloc countries choosing to attend the Seoul Olympics rather than support North Korea. The following year North Korea hosted its own sporting event, the 13th World Festival of Youth and Students, in Pyongyang.

== Leadup to boycott ==
=== 'Co-hosting' role ===
Cognizant of the enmity existing between the two Koreas and wishing to prevent any actions which might undermine the Games' organization, the International Olympic Committee (IOC) decided early on to make ensuring North Korean participation in the Games a priority. The idea of having North Korea co-host the Games did not originate with the IOC; rather, the idea first came from Italian Foreign Minister Giulio Andreotti, who suggested to South Korean Foreign Minister Lee Won Kyong on June 27, 1984, that one way of assuring a "smooth running of the Games" in Seoul was for South Korea to consider ceding a particular number of sporting events and locations to the North, who would act as co-host for those segments. That idea was similarly suggested by Cuban President Fidel Castro, who, on November 29, 1984, sent a letter to the president of the IOC, Juan Antonio Samaranch, where Castro criticized the IOC's choice of Seoul for the Summer Games and requested that the Games be split between North and South Korea. The precedent for carrying out an Olympic Games' athletic events in two separate countries was previously set at the 1956 Summer Olympic Games, when Australia hosted the majority of events in Melbourne while equestrian events were held in Stockholm.

In order to explore how an arrangement for sharing the 1988 Games might work, the IOC proposed coordinating a series of joint meetings to begin in 1985.

=== First joint meeting ===
The first joint meetings between the IOC and the North and South Korean NOCs began on October 8, 1985, in Lausanne. Kim Yu-sun, North Korean Minister of Sport and President of the Olympic Committee of the Democratic People's Republic of Korea (OCDPRK), put forward the following proposals:

- Renaming the Games to the Korean Olympic Games
- A joint organizing committee to replace the SLOOC
- North and South to field a single, combined athletic team
- Opening and closing ceremonies held in Pyongyang and Seoul
- North and South to split evenly all athletic events

Kim Jong-ha, President of the South Korean National Olympic Committee (then known as the Korean Amateur Sport Association or KASA), responded by citing the legal contracts which the IOC entered into with the South Korean NOC and the Republic of Korea. While the South was prepared to offer a minimum number of events to the North, the "established facts" of those contracts precluded them from agreeing to many of the items on the North's list save for two modified elements: That a location within North Korea serve as a partial site for one athletic competition, perhaps a cycling event, and that the two Korean teams enter Seoul's Olympic stadium together in one instance during the Opening Ceremonies. After two days of meetings the first round was adjourned until a second round could be held, scheduled for January 1986.

=== Meeting of the socialist sports ministers' conference ===
In the time between the first two joint sessions, Samaranch traveled to Hanoi on November 14–16, 1985, to attend the 34th Socialist Countries Sports Ministers' Conference in order to gauge the level of support North Korea might receive from its ideologically oriented brethren. Upon his arrival, Samaranch was disappointed to learn that North Korean Minister Kim Yu-sun was using his time in Hanoi to lobby other countries' participants into adopting a categorical resolution against the Games occurring only in Seoul. Despite this lobbying, only Cuba at this early stage appeared to be so-strongly supportive of North Korea's proposals that it was considering a boycott, with Cuban Minister of Sport Conrado Martinez using his speech time to effectively deliver what Samaranch called "a diatribe" against the IOC and the 1988 Games.

The other nations present offered only cautious support when discussing the matter, seemingly avoiding any commitments to a boycott. Chairman of the Czechoslovak Olympic Committee, Antonín Himl, supported the idea of organizing some events in North Korea, while Vice-President of the Romanian Athletics Federation, Lia Manoliu, merely reaffirmed her support of the Olympic Movement and the IOC. East German Minister of Sport Gunther Heinz spoke highly of the IOC's first joint session with the two Korean NOCs, stating that it demonstrated the possibility for positive results. Deputy Chairman of the Youth and Sports Committee at the Bulgarian Council of Ministers, Trendafil Martinski, mentioned his country's wish to avoid the boycotts that affected 1980 and 1984, while Soviet Minister of Sport Marat Gramov was not particularly insistent upon any course of action. President of the Polish Olympic Committee, Marian Renke, advanced his belief that nothing about Seoul's being chosen could be changed, no matter what North Korea was hoping for, while the Mongolian Minister of Sport, Dabaagiyn Dashdobdon, expressed only mild support for North Korea. The Hungarian NOC's representative emphasized that they supported any efforts that aimed to stage the 1988 Games jointly by South and North Korea in a way acceptable to both.

=== Second and third joint meetings ===
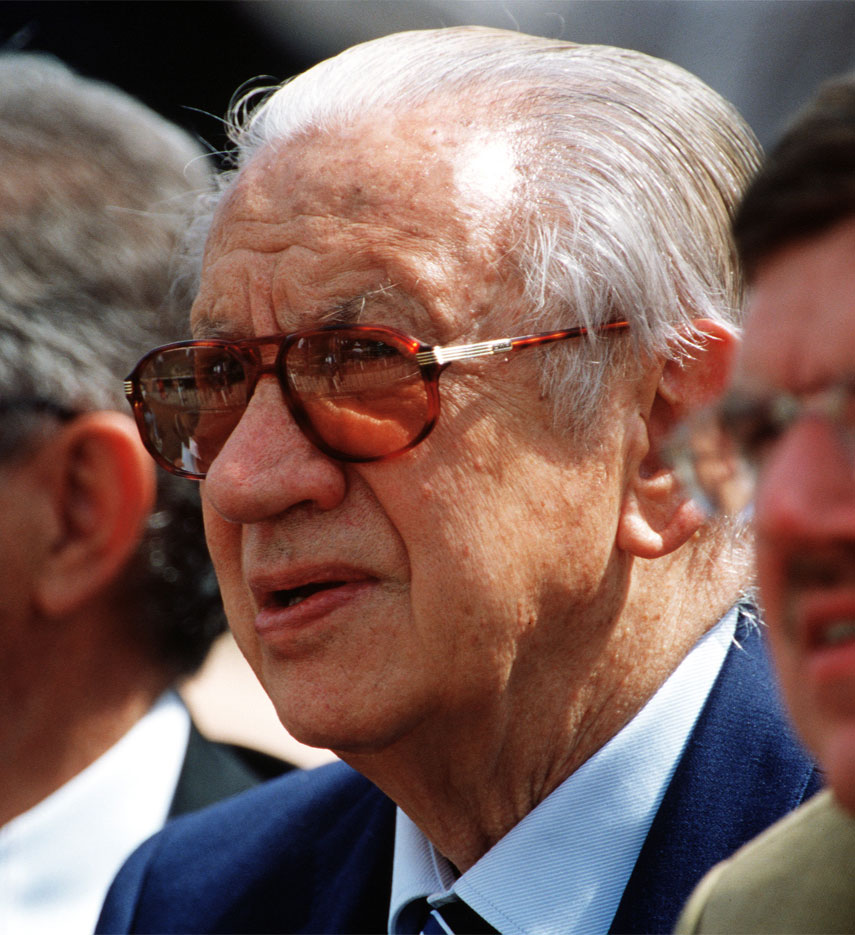
Juan Antonio Samaranch, President of the International Olympic Committee, facilitated the negotiations between North and South Korea

The second joint meeting between the IOC and North and South Korea occurred on January 8–9, 1986, in Lausanne. At this meeting, the IOC announced the number of events they were willing to cede to the North had increased from one event to three events: soccer, table tennis and archery. Another request the IOC was now willing to accept wholesale was for changing the name of those competitions held strictly in Pyongyang to The XXIVth Olympic Games in Pyongyang. Despite this, the number of events requested by the North remained stubbornly high at eight events, far more than the South and the IOC were prepared to accept. By March 1986 that number had dropped to six events. By the time of the third round held in June 1986, North Korea said they were willing to accept four events: table tennis, archery, preliminary-round soccer, and a 100-km cycle race from Pyongyang to Seoul. However, by February 1987 North Korean demands for the number of athletic competitions had inexplicably increased back to eight events. Samaranch stated that "I think the offer we made to the North Koreans was both historic and very generous ... there could be minor changes, but we cannot go beyond that".

=== North Korean applications for Soviet influence ===
On May 16, 1986, Hwang Jang-yop, Secretary of the Central Committee of the Workers' Party of Korea, met in Moscow with his Soviet counterpart Alexander Yakovlev, where Hwang pressed the Soviets to continue placing pressure on the South regarding the Games' allocations, stating "our adversary began making concessions to us when the Soviet Union and other socialist countries put it under pressure. ... However, when this pressure weakened, the adversary tried to regain the lost ground". Hwang also called out members of the Eastern Bloc who were failing in their support of the North, lamenting that "unfortunately, some of our friends are hurrying with the agreement to go to Seoul for participation in the Olympic Games", and that the North would like instead "for all socialist countries to take firm class-based positions and undertake joint actions to expose the plans of the adversary and to support our proposals on the joint organization of the Games". Hwang repeated his request to Yakovlev along with one particular suggestion:

"It is desirable that the fraternal Soviet Union put the adversary under pressure. This will create favorable circumstances for the realization of our goals at the talks in Lausanne. The Soviet comrades could, for instance, declare that if the proposal of the DPRK about joint organization of the Games were not accepted, the Olympic Movement would face a dangerous crisis, that the South Korean side must shoulder full responsibility for the separatist holding of the Olympic Games in Seoul."

— Hwang Jang-yop, Secretary, Central Committee of the Workers' Party of Korea

In October 1986 North Korean leader Kim Il Sung met with Soviet General Secretary Mikhail Gorbachev, who informed Kim of his belief that attendance at Olympic events with one's opponents would prove more influential than boycotting them, saying "the Olympics is a huge channel for cooperation, for influencing in the needed direction". When the discussion turned to the possibility of a boycott by the Eastern Bloc in support of North Korea achieving its aims, Gorbachev said, "if we took this road, we would do injury to ourselves, and to our policy". Gorbachev's response to Kim indicated that he realized that "sports and politics were mutually intertwined, and that by associating the USSR with Pyongyang’s intransigent attitude, he would sabotage his own broader foreign policy goals".

=== Civil unrest and fourth joint meeting ===
The death of the Korean activist Park Chong-chul in January 1987 while undergoing interrogation at the hands of South Korean police led to mass protests being held across South Korea. The further death of a university student in July and concerns over South Korea's Presidential election system exacerbated the protests against the government, leading commentators around the world to question South Korea's ability to successfully orchestrate the coming Summer Games. A speech given by Roh Tae-woo, the candidate for President of South Korea at the next election, was viewed positively as resolving the protests.

Meanwhile, the fourth round of joint meetings began on July 14, 1987. Despite Samaranch's previous claim from February 1987 that the proposals offered in June 1986 were likely the last, best offer to the North, the offer being discussed in July 1987 was an "improved proposal" of four (4) full events plus one (1) partial event:

- Full men's and women's table tennis competitions
- Full men's and women's archery competitions
- Full women's volleyball competitions
- Full cycle road race to be run entirely in the North
- Part of the soccer tournament

Additional considerations, including scheduling for a fifth series of meetings where the parties would discuss the formation of a new organizing committee in the North to coordinate activities held there, as well as ensuring television coverage, were also to be granted. The agreement would go into effect only as long as the North agreed to comply with the Olympic Charter, to attend the opening and closing ceremonies (which would be held in Seoul), to participate fully in the Games and guarantee unrestricted travel across their border. Samaranch described the proposals as "exceptional and unprecedented" and urged the North to make a timely reply. Inexplicably the North failed to accept the newer proposals.

=== Failure of the joint meetings ===
IOC Vice President Richard W. Pound described the different positions of the North and South and the inability to meet in the middle as "the very heart of the political problem", and that in the end, "the likelihood of inter-Korean cooperation on the scale necessary to coordinate the logistical aspects of the Olympic Games was, at best, illusory". The peculiar manner in which the two Koreas communicated with each other also complicated their search for middle ground. Samaranch referred to this as the Olendorf Method, which involves "responding to any statement or question with something entirely off‑point and completely unrelated to the topic at hand", the resulting chaos being "often a feature of the[ir] negotiations".

It was noted that only part of the soccer tournament was being offered by the time of the fourth round (when earlier it was offered in full) and that if Samaranch had offered it in full, perhaps an agreement could have been reached. But by the time of the fourth round of meetings, with the Soviet Union and other Bloc countries' attendance practically certain and North Korea's demands for sport having increased yet again to eight events, Samaranch found that he "needed talks more than he needed an agreement". The IOC had been handed a silver lining, as Pound saw it, with the more radicalized, eternally‑shifting positions of the North working against them realizing their goals while helping the South and the IOC to realize theirs:

"The more it could appear that the IOC was doing everything to be reasonable in the face of unreasonable conduct, the more likely it was that the other NOCs would be sympathetic to the IOC's efforts. The more irrational and unreasonable the DPRK could appear to be, the better it would be for this process. So the IOC wanted to keep pressure on the North and to continue to give them more opportunities to isolate themselves. North Korea resolutely took advantage of every such opportunity to lose the backing of those who might otherwise have been inclined to support its position."

— Richard W. Pound, IOC Vice President

With a failure in negotiations, the destruction of Korean Air Flight 858 in November 1987—and the North's apparent culpability in the bombing—left it even more isolated, with "such support as they might have garnered, even among the socialist countries, evaporating significantly thereafter".

== Boycotting countries ==
=== North Korea ===
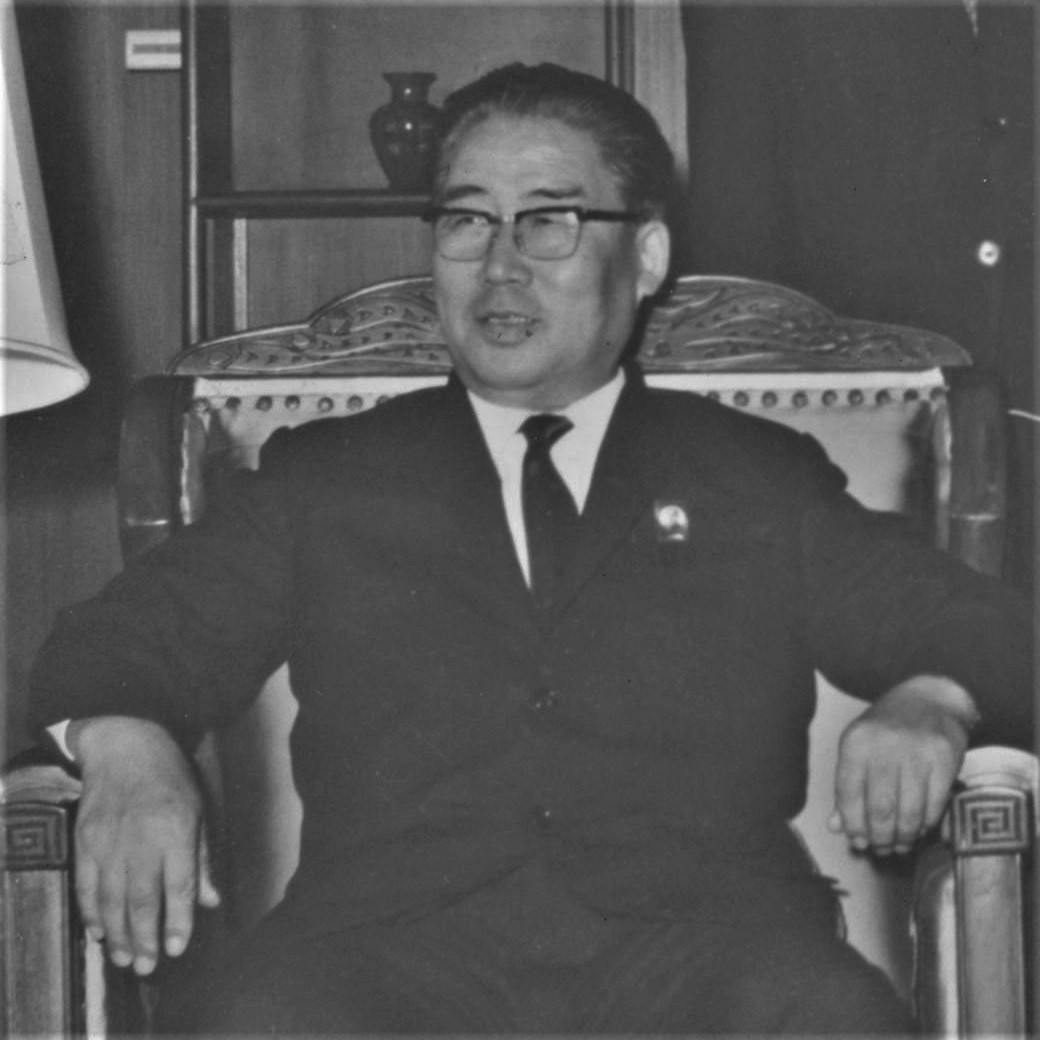
Pak Song-chol, Vice President of North Korea, was instrumental in garnering Cuban and Nicaraguan support of the boycott

With the North Koreans refusing to accept the IOC's 'historic' proposals, and no more joint meetings on schedule that might have offered North Korea additional room to maneuver, on January 12, 1988, the North announced it was boycotting the Games. The Korean Central News Agency reported on the announcement made by the North Korean NOC, saying "we will not participate in the Olympic Games to be singly hosted by South Korea".

=== Cuba ===
On February 4, 1986, the Cuban Communist Party Third Congress began in Havana, with Cuban President Fidel Castro hosting the majority of Cuban government officialdom along with a smattering of foreign socialist dignitaries, among them, North Korean Vice President Pak Song-chol and Nicaraguan President Daniel Ortega.

On February 6, North Korean Vice President Pak made a speech to the other assembled dignitaries where he urged them to "wage a dynamic struggle" for North Korea to get a share of the 1988 Summer Olympic Games. In response, Castro offered his guarantee that Cuba would boycott the 1988 Games unless North and South co-hosted the event. Castro's stance was prompted in part by Cuba's loss to Ecuador as host of the 1987 Pan American Games, (Note: Ecuador withdrew as host of the 1987 Pan American Games in 1984. Despite lobbying by Cuba, Indianapolis was chosen as host city.) with "Castro's support for Kim Il Sung in the dispute over the Seoul Olympics thus complementing his own set of grievances about the state of the international Olympic movement".

On January 15, 1988, Cuba reiterated that it would boycott the Games in Seoul owing to "North Korea not being invited to co-host the event with South Korea". The official Cuban news agency Prensa Latina, reporting on an announcement made in Havana by Cuban Olympic Committee President Manuel González Guerra, said Cuba "will not register for, nor will it commit itself to participating in the Olympic Games", adding that Cuba "would be prepared to reconsider its decision if there were co-sponsorship of the Games". Castro, in a letter sent to Samaranch on January 13, 1988, implored the IOC not to levy sanctions against Cuba for its decision, saying "even though we deeply regret this unavoidable decision, our people and our athletes, who abide by deep ethic norms and a great sense of honor, will not be discouraged and will continue to participate in the Olympics of Barcelona in 1992, if we are not sanctioned for maintaining a dignified behavior."

=== Nicaragua ===
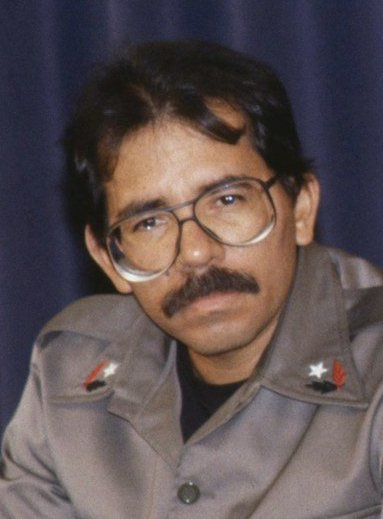
Nicaraguan President Daniel Ortega first pledged his support of North Korea's hosting demands in February 1986 and reiterated that support while visiting Kim Il Sung in Pyongyang in September 1986

On February 7, 1986, during the final day of the Cuban Communist Party Third Congress, North Korean Vice President Pak met privately with Nicaraguan President Ortega, where Pak repeated his exhortations for Nicaraguan support of North Korea co-hosting the Olympics. As Castro did earlier, Ortega pledged Nicaragua's support, saying that his country would not participate in the Seoul Games if North Korea's proposal to co-host did not come about.

On September 15, 1986, while visiting North Korea, Ortega repeated this pledge at a banquet hosted by Kim Il Sung, with Ortega affirming that "Nicaragua will not participate in the Games if the co-hosting proposal of the Democratic People's Republic of Korea is not realized".

On May 20, 1987, Nicaraguan Olympic Committee (NOC) President Moisés Hassan restated his country's plan of action that "if the 1988 Olympics are not carried out in Pyongyang and Seoul, the two Korean capitals, Nicaragua will not attend this event".

Despite these three prior pronouncements on Nicaragua's boycott intent, on January 16, 1988, in a telex explaining Nicaragua's non-participation sent by Nicaraguan OC President Hassan to IOC President Samaranch, there was no mention made of North Korea. Instead, Hassan claimed a 'lack of concentration on sport' due to hostilities in Nicaragua, non-qualification of their best athletes through the Pan American Games, and a 'bad economic situation' as causing Nicaragua's non‑attendance. Samaranch dismissed these explanations as false, calling Hassan's telex "a feeble rationalization of a political decision not to participate", and reminded Hassan in a reply telex that the Nicaraguan OC would not share in any of the Olympic Solidarity funds for the period of 1988–1992 if it failed to participate in the Seoul Games, "seeing as they will not have contributed towards raising the funds which we subsequently distribute". Samaranch also told Hassan that he found it strange that Nicaragua would have participated in the Olympic Games in Los Angeles, the Central American and Caribbean Games and the Pan American Games the year before, seeing as how the country at the time of those events was "in the same circumstances as the present".

=== Ethiopia ===
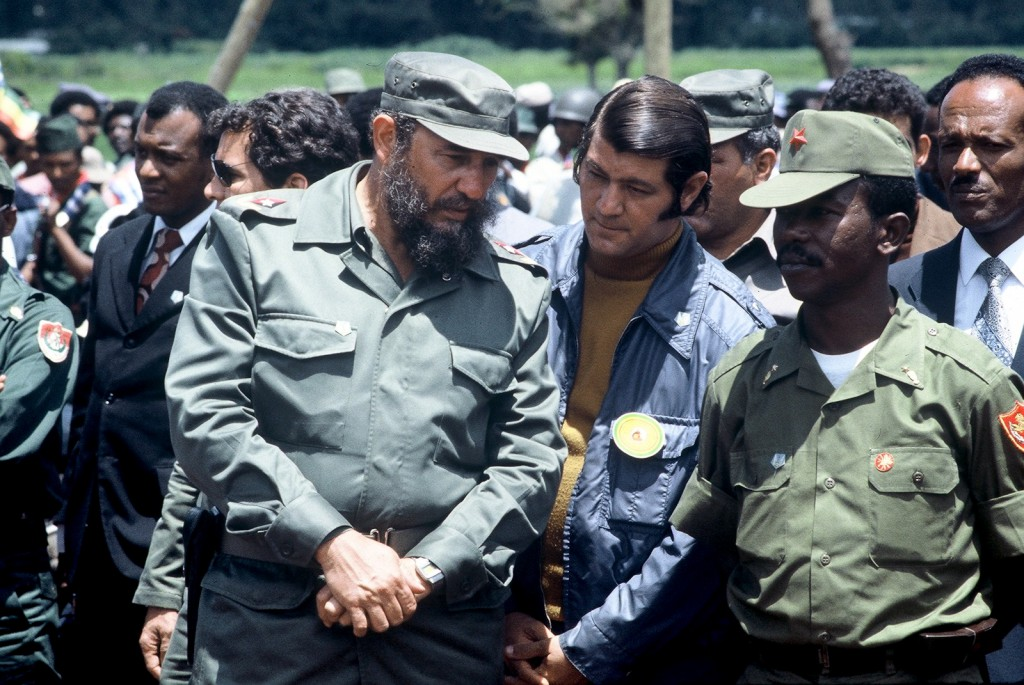
Ethiopian leader Mengistu Haile Mariam enjoyed a long-standing relationship with Fidel Castro, whose Cuba took early initiative in supporting the North Korean boycott

On December 18, 1985, in an address given before the Association of National Olympic Committees of Africa, President of the Ethiopian Olympic Committee and Commissioner for Sports and Physical Culture, Tsegaw Ayele, warned of an Olympic boycott in 1988 if the Games were not co-hosted by North Korea. According to Samaranch, Ayele's address signaled that the internal decision for Ethiopia to boycott was likely already made by the Ethiopian Communist Party Central Committee two years before being announced. Ethiopian President Mengistu Haile Mariam had told Samaranch that the decision to give South Korea the right to host the 1988 Olympics in Seoul on its own should be reviewed, and warned that if they were not co-hosted by Pyongyang and Seoul, "many countries might well boycott them". Unfortunately for Ethiopia and its athletes Samaranch surmised, President Mariam's prognostications failed to take into account the directional changes made by other members of the Eastern Bloc, which by a later point were in fact moving away from boycotts and towards participation in the Seoul Games.

Nevertheless, on January 20, 1988, Ethiopia publicly announced that it would boycott the 1988 Summer Olympics in solidarity with North Korea, saying "At a time when the Korean people, who are divided against their will, are struggling for peaceful negotiations, Ethiopia strongly objects to the Olympic Games being conducted in South Korea, which further strengthens disunity", adding that Ethiopia would participate "if the decision to keep the Games in South Korea were reversed".

=== Madagascar ===
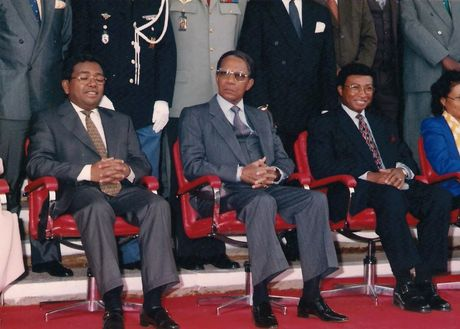
A number of government officials working under Malagasy President Ratsiraka reportedly opposed Madagascar's joining the boycott, but were unable or unwilling to challenge the president's decision‑making on the matter

Between June 23–26, 1988, Samaranch tasked a UNESCO official, Charles Randriamanantenasoa, with paying a visit to Madagascar during celebrations for the twenty-eighth anniversary of Malagasy Independence. During this visit, Randriamanantenasoa met with various government officials as well as Malagasy President Didier Ratsiraka, to whom Randriamanantenasoa delivered a plea for allowing "the young people and the athletes" of Madagascar to attend the Seoul Games. Ratsiraka replied that the position adopted by the Malagasy Joint Ministers / Supreme Councillors of the Revolution Committee was that they would only participate if North Korea were allowed a co-hosting role. Randriamanantenasoa reported back to Samaranch that "although certain Malagasy officials were not in favor of the decision, none dared to make any other suggestion to the President, who alone appeared to have the final word".

Despite Ratsiraka's intransigence, Madagascar mistakenly responded positively to the initial invitation to attend, but later corrected itself, withdrawing from the Games in support of North Korea, just as Ratsiraka said it would. This reason was noted by the SLOOC in their official report on the Games released in 1989.

=== Albania ===
Albania did not publicly offer a reason for their boycott, but the country was generally believed to have subscribed to a policy of isolationism at the time. The 1988 Summer Olympic Games represented the fourth Summer Games in a row which Albania boycotted.

=== Seychelles ===
The Seychelles did not publicly offer a reason for their boycott.

In 1977, the democratically elected president of the Seychelles, James Mancham, was overthrown in a coup d'état by Seychellois prime minister France-Albert René, who was assisted in his takeover by troops from Tanzania. After installing himself as president, René aligned the Seychelles militarily and economically with the Soviet Union, Cuba and North Korea.

In 1983, René signed a military agreement with North Korea, wherein Tanzanian troops who had kept him in power since 1977 were replaced with North Korean troops and advisers, who assisted René in his fight against exiled anti-communist rebels. President René also used the North Korean troops as bodyguards, according to the director of the U.S. State Department Office of East African Affairs, David Fischer.

In August 1985, President René told the North Korean Government that their military agreement with the Seychelles would not be renewed. As a result, in September 1985, approximately 50 to 100 North Korean troops and advisers left the country. According to sources at the U.S. Embassy in Dar es Salaam, President René's dissatisfaction with North Korea originated in part due to pressure North Korea had placed upon the Seychelles to publicly announce a boycott of the 1988 Summer Games.

== Non-boycotting socialist countries ==
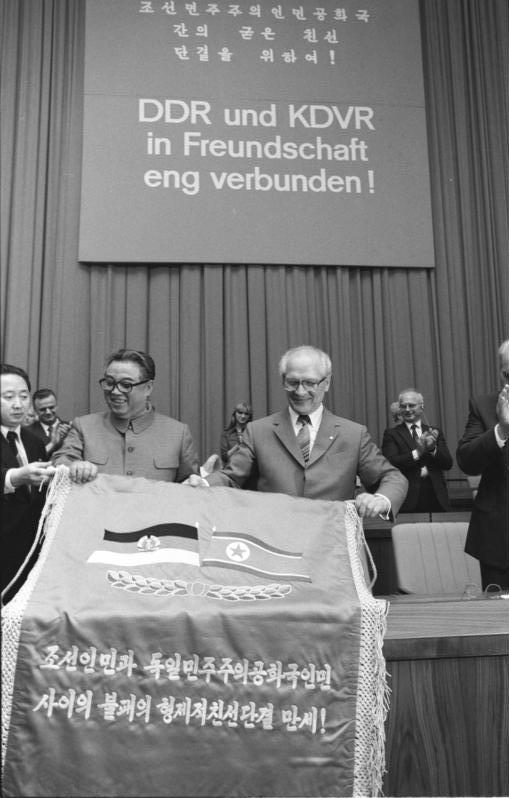
Despite Kim Il Sung and Erich Honecker's long record of solidarity, East Germany indicated in late 1986 that it would attend the Seoul Games

The SLOOC went to great lengths to include representatives of the Soviet Union, the Eastern European states and China in all meetings which occurred during the lead-up preparations for the Games, which caused those Socialist countries to respond favorably. Largely owing to those and other actions, the following members of the Eastern Bloc and other related socialist countries did not join the boycott, and chose to participate in the 1988 Summer Olympic Games:

- Afghanistan
- Angola indicated that it would attend the Seoul Games on January 7, 1988.
- Benin
- Bulgaria
- Burma indicated that it would attend the 1988 Seoul Games on January 8, 1988.
- Czechoslovakia
- China publicly indicated that it would attend the 1988 Games on January 14, 1988. Chinese paramount leader Deng Xiaoping already privately told North Korea in November 1985 that China intended to participate in the Seoul Games.
- Republic of the Congo
- East Germany along with Hungary, became the first two Eastern Bloc countries to announce that they would attend the 1988 Summer Olympic Games on December 21, 1987. East German leader Erich Honecker already indicated to Samaranch on November 14, 1986, that his country intended to participate, telling Samaranch East Germany was "preparing for the 1988 Olympic Games at Seoul". Despite Honecker's willingness to send a team to the Games, East Germany's Stasi still took great precaution by monitoring their team for possible defections while in Seoul.
- Hungary along with East Germany, became the first Eastern Bloc nations to accept their invitations to the 1988 Games on December 21, 1987.
- Laos
- Mali indicated that it would attend the 1988 Seoul Games on January 7, 1988.
- Mongolia
- Mozambique
- Poland accepted its invitation to the Games on January 5, 1988, saying "the Polish Olympic Committee approved an invitation of the International Olympic Committee to take part in the Olympic Games".
- Romania indicated that it would attend the 1988 Seoul Games on January 8, 1988. Romania was the only European Eastern Bloc country to attend the 1984 Summer Olympic Games in Los Angeles.
- Soviet Union made its public announcement on January 11, 1988, that it would be attending the Seoul Games. Marat Gramov, President of the Soviet NOC, conceded that the political boycotts that have "tarnished" the Summer Olympics since 1976 were counterproductive, saying "from my point of view, it is not the best page in the history of the Olympic Games". The Soviets previously indicated to the IOC as early as the summer of 1985, during Samaranch's visit to Moscow, that it was "ready to take part in the Games" and that they were "not worried regarding the position of North Korea". According to Samaranch, the Soviets became agreeable owing in part to their desire at fostering interest in having the 1994 Winter Olympics hosted by Leningrad. (Note: The 1994 Winter Olympics were eventually hosted by Lillehammer.)
- Vietnam
- South Yemen
- Yugoslavia

== Counterpart sporting event ==
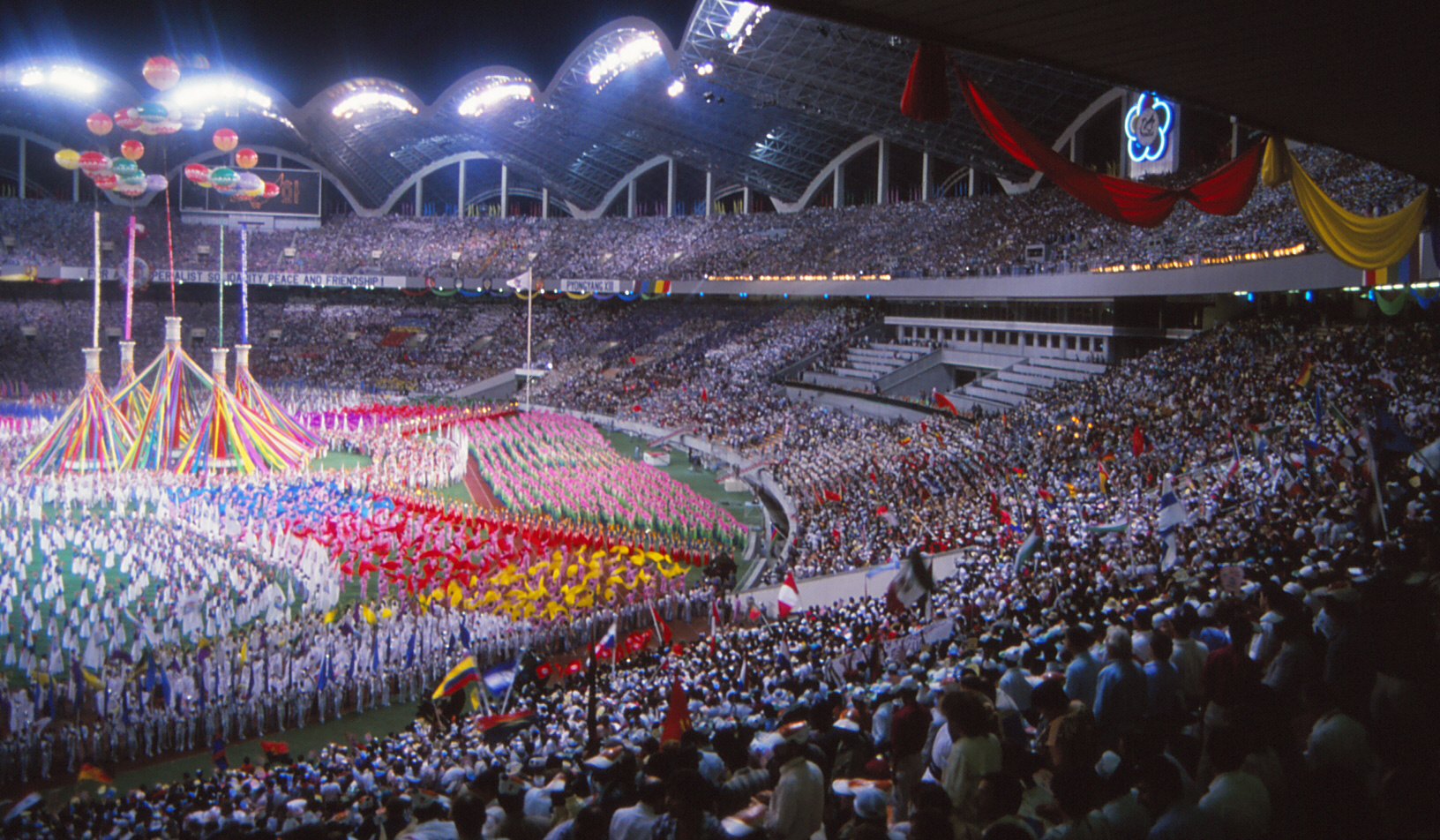
The 13th World Festival of Youth and Students, billed by North Korea as a counterpart to the Seoul Games, was held in Pyongyang in 1989

A large scale sporting event, the 13th World Festival of Youth and Students—billed by North Korea as a counterpart to the 1988 Summer Olympics—was held in Pyongyang on July 1–8, 1989. The event was attended mostly by members of the Eastern Bloc and other socialist nations of the Non-Aligned Movement.

== See also ==
- Albania–North Korea relations
- Cuba–North Korea relations
- Nicaragua–North Korea relations
- North Korea–Seychelles relations
