= Key-sung Cho =

South Korean diplomat (born 1936)

Key-sung Cho (born 1936 in Jangheung, Korea, Empire of Japan) is a South Korean diplomat. He served in South Korea's foreign service for over 38 years and was the former South Korean Ambassador to Guatemala, Peru, and Argentina. During his tenure as the South Korean ambassador to Guatemala from 1988 to 1990, imports of South Korean textiles were closely regulated in the United States, so Cho convinced South Korean manufacturers to move their operations to Guatemala. In Guatemala, 50 such factories were opened from 1988 to 1991. Under Cho's direction, the Korean Embassy consulted and mediated for South Korean manufacturers.

Since retiring from the foreign service in 1999, Cho was a visiting scholar at the School of Advanced International Studies at the Johns Hopkins University and Georgetown University Law Center, as well as a professor of International Law at the Ewha Womans University College of Law in Seoul, Korea and Chosun University in Kwangju, Korea. Cho is currently the Chairman of the Medical Peace Foundation, a non-profit organization he founded which develops medical centers in impoverished parts of the world.
