= Embassy of Peru, Seoul =

Diplomatic mission in South Korea

Embassy of Peru in Korea
- Location: Seoul, South Korea
- Opened: July 1967
- Website: Official website

The Embassy of Peru in Korea (Korean: 주한 페루 대사관, Spanish: Embajada del Perú en Corea) is the diplomatic representation of Peru in South Korea. The current Peruvian ambassador to South Korea is Daúl Matute Mejía.

Peru and South Korea established relations in 1963, elevating them to embassy level one year later and maintaining them since. Peru opened an embassy in Seoul in July 1967, and South Korea opened an embassy in 1971.

== See also ==
- Embassy of South Korea, Lima
