= Chile–South Korea relations =

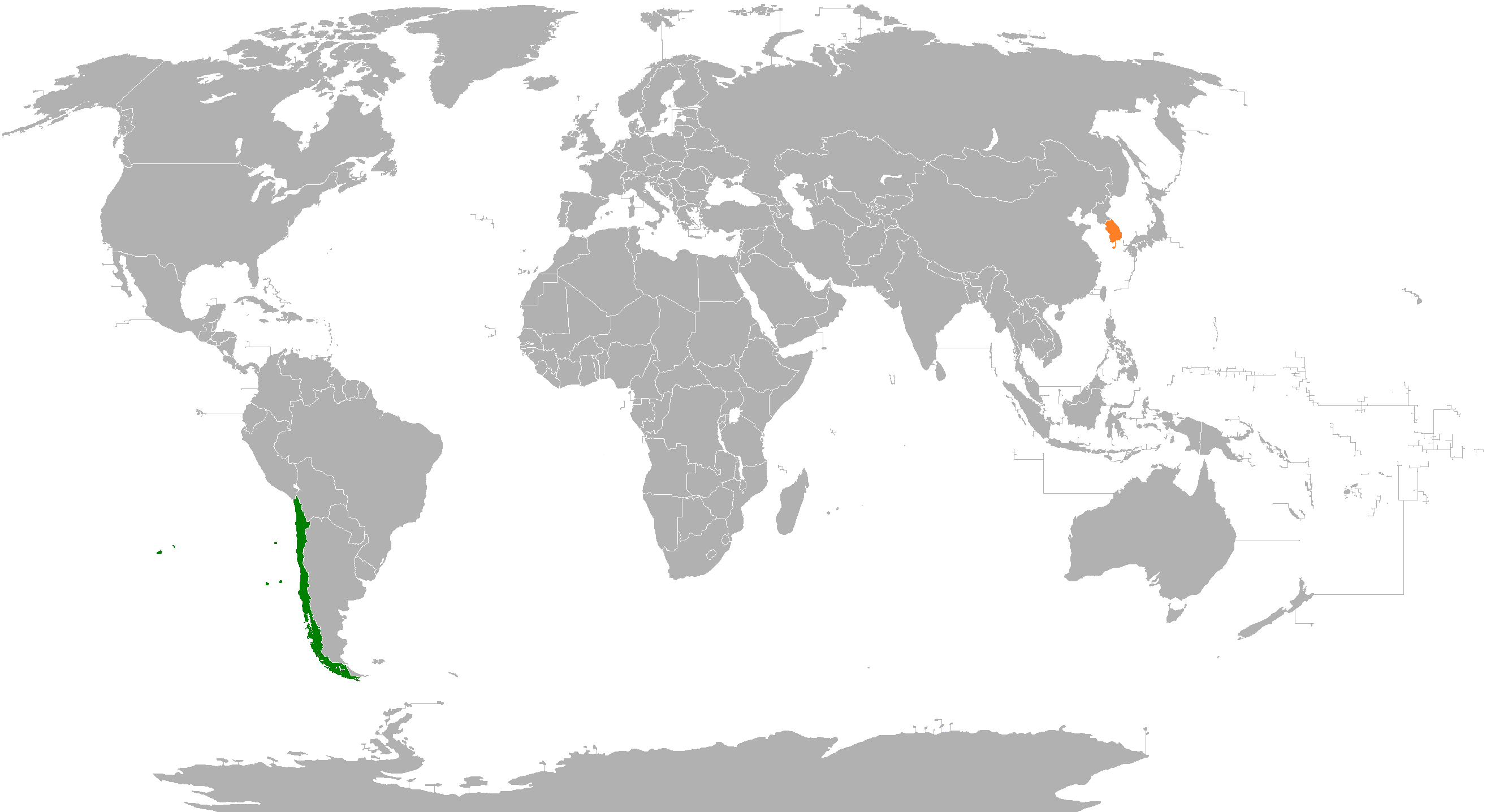
- Chile: South Korea

Chile–South Korea relations are the diplomatic relations between Chile and South Korea. Both nations are members of the Asia-Pacific Economic Cooperation, Forum of East Asia–Latin America Cooperation and the Organisation for Economic Co-operation and Development.

== History ==
In 1962, Chile and South Korea officially established diplomatic relations.

== Foreign aid ==
In 2010, the South Korean government pledged $2 million in aid supplies following the 2010 Chile earthquake.

== High level visits ==
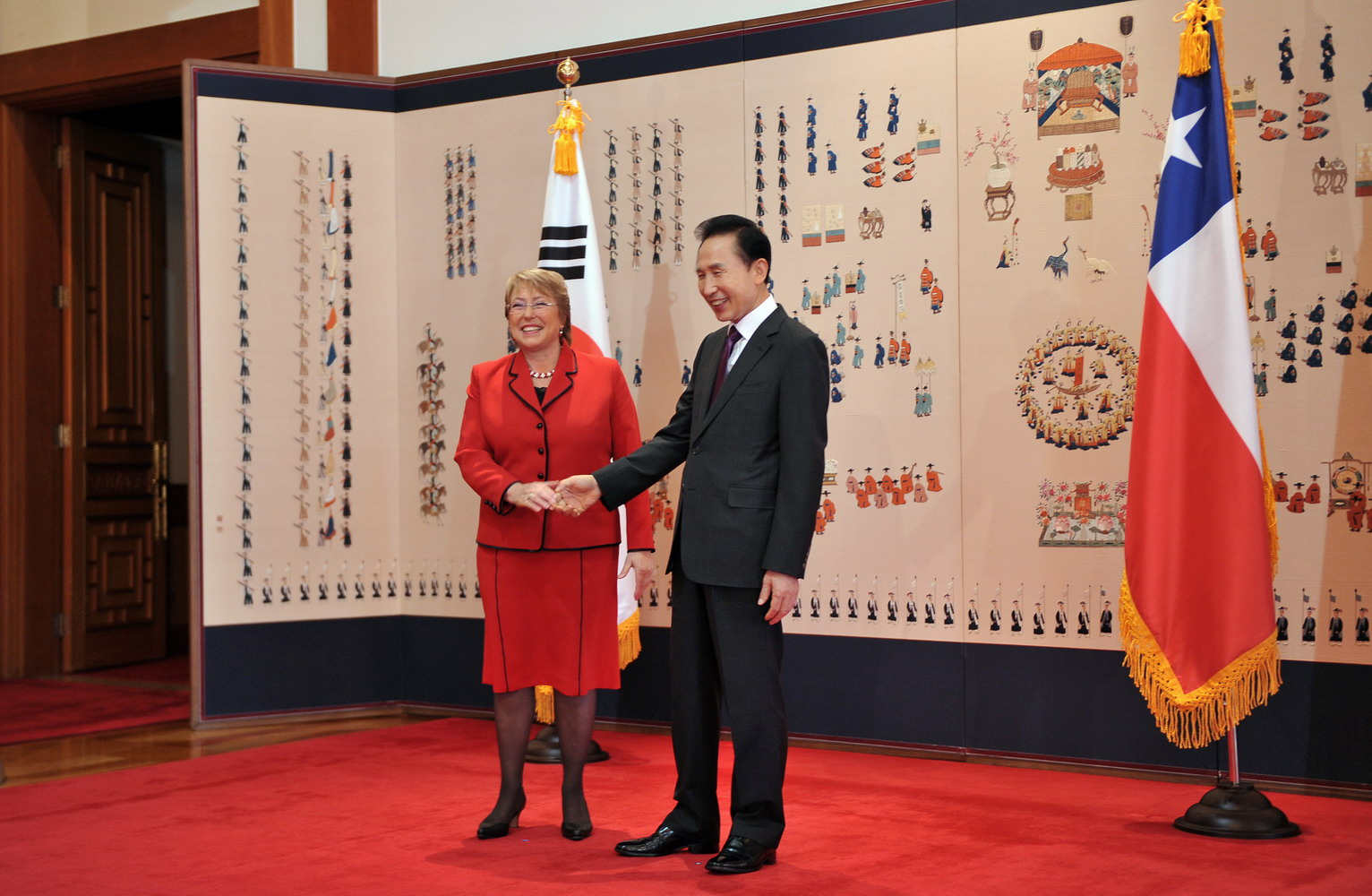
South Korean President Lee Myung-bak and visiting Chilean President Michelle Bachelet Jeria held a summit meeting at Lee's office in Seoul, 2009.

=== High-level visits from Chile to South Korea ===
- President Eduardo Frei Ruiz-Tagle (1994)
- President Ricardo Lagos (2003)
- President Michelle Bachelet (2009)
- President Sebastián Piñera (2012 & 2019)

=== High-level visits from South Korea to Chile ===
- President Kim Young-sam (1996)
- President Roh Moo-hyun (2004)
- President Lee Myung-bak (2012)
- President Park Geun-hye (2015)

== Bilateral economic relations ==
Chile and South Korea entered into a free trade agreement in 2004.

== Resident diplomatic missions ==
- Chile has an embassy in Seoul.
- South Korea has an embassy in Santiago.

== See also ==
- Foreign relations of South Korea
  - Indo-Pacific Strategy of South Korea
- Foreign relations of Chile
