= Albania–North Korea relations =

- Albania: North Korea

Diplomatic relations between Albania and North Korea were established on November 28, 1948, over one and a half months after the DPRK was proclaimed. The communist governments of Enver Hoxha and Kim Il Sung were often compared for their similarities in their diplomatic isolation and Stalinist-style regimes.

== History ==
=== Cold War ===
The People's Republic of Albania formally recognized the Democratic People's Republic of Korea on November 28, 1948 as the sole legitimate government of all of Korea.

During the Korean War, North Korea and the Korean People's Army were supported diplomatically by Albania. There were articles in which North Korea criticized Tito's Yugoslavia and took a side with Albania during the Korean War. From 29 June to 1 July 1956, First Secretary of the Party of Labour of Albania Enver Hoxha hosted Premier Kim Il Sung in Tirana on a state visit. On 6 June 1959, Hoxha and Prime Minister Mehmet Shehu received Chairman of the Standing Committee of the Supreme People's Assembly (head of state) Choe Yong-gon on an official goodwill visit. In 1961, Albania and North Korea signed a joint declaration of friendship.

=== Sino-Soviet Split and deterioration ===
According to Charles Armstrong, Albania was a “litmus test” for determining North Korea’s position in the Sino-Soviet split. During the Sino-Soviet split, North Korea took a neutral position while Albania supported the Chinese, contributing to the deterioration of relations. This had an effect on Albanian-Korean contacts, with the Albanian ambassador claiming in October 1961 that Premier Kim during a congress meeting in Moscow "could and should have had more contacts with our delegation" and that "he was afraid of being noticed by the Soviets.” That month, the Albanian embassy to Pyongyang was allowed to spread anti-Soviet pamphlets after prior consultations with the North Korean government. At a WPK general meeting in March 1962, Premier Kim admitted that “we (North Korea) must prepare for the contingency that the Soviet Union will cast us aside in the same way as it happened to Albania.”

In the 1970s, relations between the two nations deteriorated, with Hoxha writing in June 1977 that the Korean Workers' Party had betrayed communism by accepting foreign aid (particularly between the Eastern Bloc and countries such as Yugoslavia). His condemnation of the DPRK contributed to the development of his own ideology of Hoxhaism, which labeled countries like North Korea as "revisionist". He also slammed Kim's cult of personality, which he claimed "has reached a level unheard of anywhere else, either in past or present times, let alone in a country which calls itself socialist." As a result, relations between the two nations would continue to remain frosty until the 1985 death of Hoxha and the subsequent fall of the People's Socialist Republic he created.

=== Modern era ===
Relations are almost non-existent after 1990, due to Albania establishing stronger relations with South Korea. In November 2012, on the occasion of the 100th Anniversary of the Independence of Albania, North Korean head of state Kim Yong-nam sent a congratulatory message to Albanian President Bujar Nishani. Today, North Korea is represented in Albania by its embassy in Sofia, Bulgaria.
