= Colégio Polilogos =

1998–2017 Korean school in Brazil

- 브라질한국학교

Location
- Rua Solon, 1018 - Bom Retiro São Paulo - SP; São Paulo; Brazil
- Coordinates: 23.5258016°S 46.64617129999999°W

Information
- Type: Primary school
- Website: web.archive.org/*/http://colegiopolilogos.com.br/

Colégio Polilogos (Korean: 브라질한국학교) was a South Korean international school in Bom Retiro, São Paulo, Brazil. It was operated by Associação Brasileira de Educação Coreana (ABEC; Korean: 한브교육협회) and was the largest Korean international day school in South America. It was recognized by the South Korean government and was bilingual in Korean and Portuguese.

Construction started around 1996. It opened in 1998. The Ministry of Education (South Korea) helped pay for the establishment of the school, which took 3.5 billion won of ministry funding and donations and another 3.5 billion won of investments. At some point it was not registered as a nonprofit organization in Brazil, so taxes began to decimate the school in a three-year period. It closed in 2017.
