= North Korea–Peru relations =

- North Korea: Peru

Diplomatic mission
- Embassy of North Korea, Lima: None (Accredited from Beijing)

North Korea–Peru relations are the diplomatic relations between the Democratic People's Republic of Korea and the Republic of Peru. Both countries are members of the United Nations and the Non-Aligned Movement.

Diplomatic relations between Peru and North Korea are frozen since 2017, when Peru declared the Korean ambassador as a persona non grata and gave him 5 days to leave the country in response to the country's missile launches conducted earlier that month. This was followed by the expulsion of two more diplomats in December of the same year after reportedly conspiring to attack the families of the diplomatic staff of the U.S. Embassy in Lima.

== History ==
North Korea opened a trade office in Peru in January 1975, under the military government of Juan Velasco Alvarado. Relations were officially established at an embassy level on December 15, 1988.

In 1987, the then trade office was bombed by terror group Shining Path. The attack was in response of the North Korean government's support of the Peruvian government against guerrillas during the country's internal conflict, which included the sale of 10,000 AK-47s to be used by the Peruvian National Police. Another attack was attempted in 1989, but the bomb did not detonate as it was defused by the Peruvian Police.

In 2016, the Peruvian Foreign Ministry condemned the nuclear test carried out by North Korea on September 9 of the same year.

=== 2017 diplomatic incident ===
On September 11, 2017, then Korean ambassador Kim Hak-chol was declared a persona non grata and given five days to leave the country in response to nuclear tests conducted by the North Korean government. This was protested by the ambassador before leaving the embassy.

On December 22, the first and third secretaries of the embassy — Pak Myong Chol and Ji Hyok, respectively — were also given the same treatment due to their continued contact with leaders of Red Fatherland, a communist party in Peru, reportedly planning to attack the families of the diplomatic staff of the U.S. Embassy in Lima and even suggesting their assassination. As a result, the U.S. Embassy issued a security alert to its staff on September 19. The information had been discovered by law enforcement as part of an investigation against Pak Myong Hol as part of a sexual harassment complaint filed against him on behalf of a boy under 15 years old. The Red Fatherland Party confirmed that they kept in touch with the diplomatic staff, but denied the allegations made against them.

=== Relations since 2017 ===
Since 2017, Peru has condemned North Korea's missile launches on several occasions.

Peru opposes the nuclear programme of North Korea, congratulating the country in 2018 after the announcement of its suspension.

== High-level visits ==
- Foreign Minister Pak Ui-chun (2009)

== Trade ==
Until April 2016, Peruvian exports totaled US$ 34,000, the exported products being cuttlefish, balloons, and squid. North Korea exported to Peru the sum of US$5,200 in vinyl chloride polymer floor covering, stainless steel household items, and universal motors, also providing Taekwondo instructors as well as physicians specializing in acupuncture.

In 2019, Peru exported fish fillets to North Korea. The East Asian country also reportedly supported Peru in its dispute with Chile over the origin of Pisco, an alcoholic drink claimed by both countries as their own national drink.

== Diplomatic missions ==
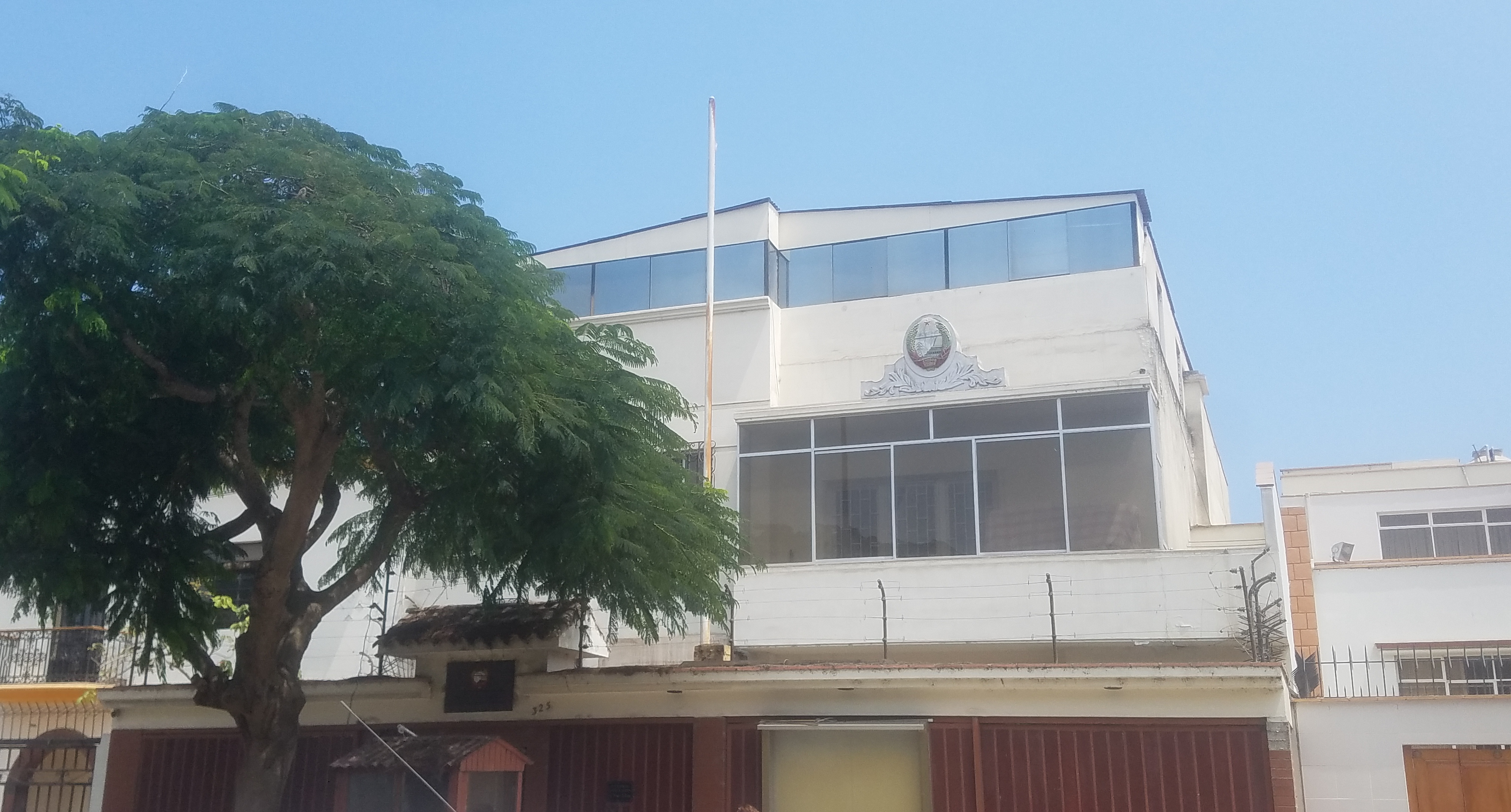
The former North Korean embassy in Lima in 2023.

- Peru is accredited to North Korea from its embassy in Beijing, although the country has not appointed a diplomat since 2017.
- North Korea has an embassy in Lima that has not been used since 2018.

== See also ==
- Foreign relations of Peru
- Foreign relations of North Korea
- List of ambassadors of North Korea to Peru
- List of ambassadors of Peru to North Korea
