= Kim Hak-chol =

North Korean diplomat

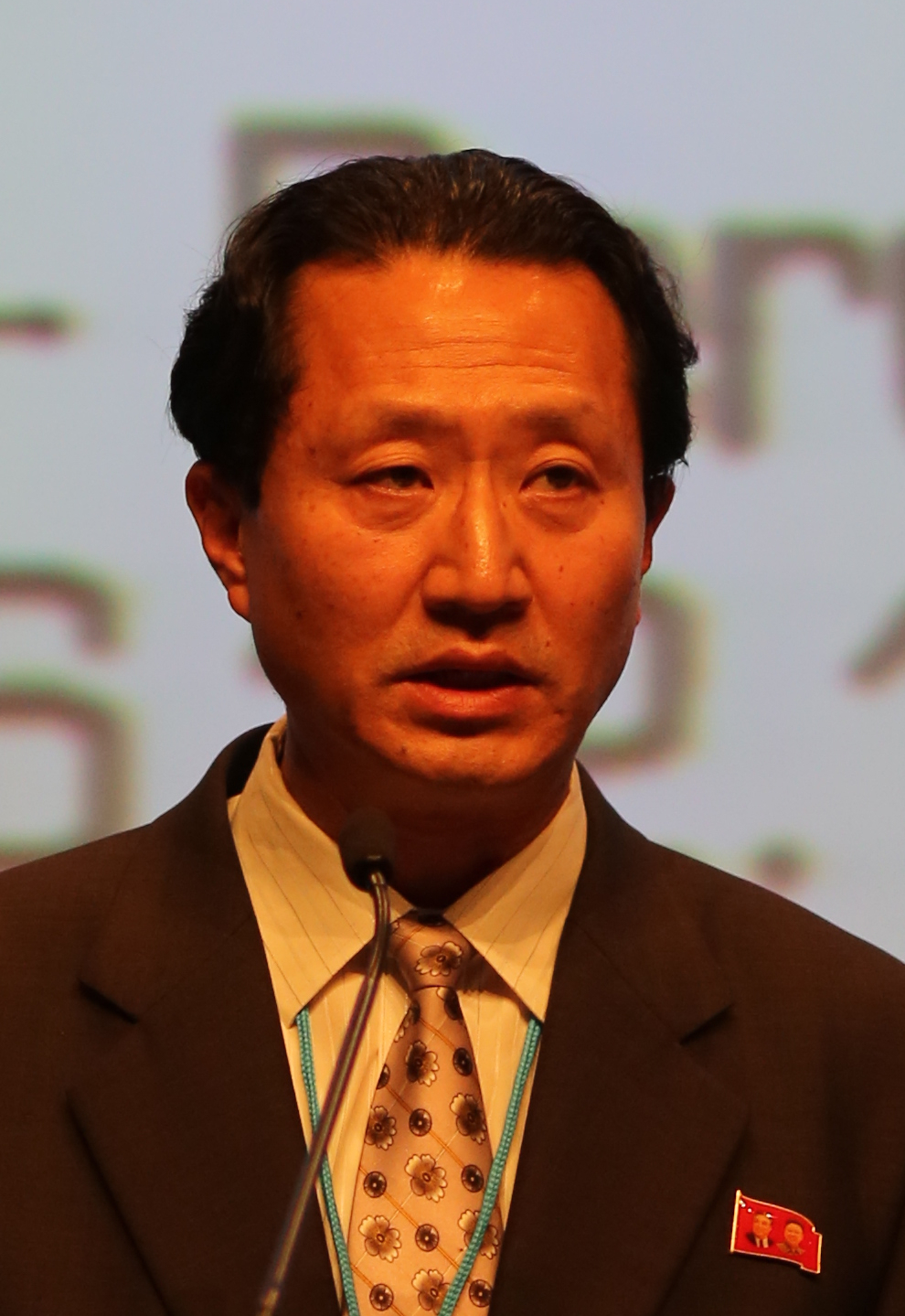
- Born: North Korea
- Occupation: Diplomat

Korean name
- Hangul: 김학철
- Hanja: 金学哲
- RR: Gim Hakcheol
- MR: Kim Hakch'ŏl

Kim Hak-chol (Korean: 김학철) is a North Korean diplomat. A member of the 12th Supreme People's Assembly, he served as ambassador of his country to Peru from 2013 until his designation as persona non grata on September 11, 2017, in response to a series of nuclear tests earlier that month.

== Biography ==
Believed to have a military background, he worked in North Korea's embassy in the Democratic Republic of the Congo in 1968. He was elected as a delegate to the 12th Supreme People's Assembly in 2009.

In October 2013, he was named as ambassador to Peru, presenting his credentials to then president Ollanta Humala on November 8 of the same year. In 2015, he became accredited to Brazil, presenting his credentials on November 3. In September 2017, he was declared a persona non grata by the Peruvian government and given a five-day period to leave the country. Prior to leaving the embassy, he held a press conference where he protested the measure. Subsequently, the first and third secretaries of the embassy—Pak Myong Chol and Ji Hyok, respectively—were also given the same treatment on December 22, after which they were accused of plotting to attack the families of the diplomatic staff of the U.S. Embassy in Lima, even suggesting their assassination.
