= Nicaragua–North Korea relations =

- Nicaragua: North Korea

Nicaragua–North Korea relations refer to the bilateral relations between Nicaragua and North Korea. Both countries are members of the Non-Aligned Movement and the Group of 77.

== History ==
From 1949 to 21 August 1979, the anti-communist Nicaraguan government only established formal diplomatic relations with South Korea, which belonged to the capitalist camp. However, after the Nicaraguan Revolution in 1979, Nicaragua, under the rule of the Sandinista National Liberation Front, established diplomatic relations with North Korea. Nicaragua became the second Central American country, after Costa Rica, to establish diplomatic relations with North Korea. Subsequently, relations between the two countries progressed further. North Korea established an embassy in Managua, supported the Sandinista National Liberation Front against the United States, sent a cultural delegation to Nicaragua, and was interested in helping the Nicaraguan government rebuild its homeland. Nicaraguan head of state and coordinator of the military government for national reconstruction, Daniel Ortega, visited Pyongyang twice, in 1983 and 1986, and bilateral trade also increased significantly. Nicaragua and North Korea joined the boycott of the 1988 Summer Olympics held in Seoul, South Korea.

However, after Violeta Chamorro became president of Nicaragua in 1990, relations between Nicaragua and North Korea became strained, and North Korea closed its embassy in Nicaragua in 1995. With Ortega's re-election as president of Nicaragua in 2007, relations between the two countries had the opportunity to recover and develop. Nicaragua opened an embassy in Pyongyang in 2024 to develop bilateral relations. However, North Korea has not yet reopened its embassy in Nicaragua, and related affairs in Nicaragua are temporarily handled by the embassy in Cuba. Both countries maintain friendly high-level interactions due to their alliance with Russia and support Russia's annexation of four southeastern Ukrainian oblasts.

== See also ==
- Foreign relations of Nicaragua
- Foreign relations of North Korea
