= List of ambassadors of Peru to South Korea =

Ambassador of Peru to the Republic of Korea
- Great Seal of Peru
- Ministry of Foreign Affairs; Booyoung Taepyung Building 9F, Sejong-daero Jung-gu 55, Seoul
- Appointer: The president of Peru
- Website: Embassy of Peru in Korea

The extraordinary and plenipotentiary ambassador of Peru to the Republic of Korea is the official representative of the Republic of Peru to the Republic of Korea.

Peru and South Korea established relations in 1963, and have maintained them since. Peru has an embassy in Seoul, and Korea has an embassy in Lima.

== List of representatives ==
Name	Term begin	Term end	President	Notes
José Carlos Ferreyros	July 1, 1967	?	Fernando Belaúnde	First ambassador to South Korea.
Gabriel García Pike	February 8, 1980	?	Juan Velasco Alvarado	As ambassador.
Guillermo Nieto	?	1989	Alan García	As ambassador.
Luis Antonio Sabogal Pérez	1989	1994	Alan García	As ambassador.
Alfredo Ramos Suero	1994	1996	Alberto Fujimori	As ambassador.
Luis Felipe Gálvez Villarroel	1996	2001	Alberto Fujimori	As ambassador.
Jorge Bayona Medina	October 9, 2002	2007	Alejandro Toledo	As ambassador; accredited to North Korea.
Marcela López	May 2007	?	Alan García	As ambassador.
Jaime Antonio Pomareda Montenegro	2012	2017	Ollanta Humala	As ambassador.
Daúl Jesús Enrique Matute Mejía	February 1, 2018	July 28, 2026	Pedro Pablo Kuczynski	As ambassador.

== See also ==
- List of ambassadors of Peru to North Korea
- List of ambassadors of South Korea to Peru
