= List of Olympic Games boycotts =

While all countries are normally eligible to compete in the Olympic Games, there have been several instances of nations boycotting or being barred from participation, often in protest to decisions made by the International Olympic Committee.

Austria, Bulgaria, Germany, Hungary, and the Ottoman Empire were not invited to attend the 1920 Antwerp Games in Belgium, having lost World War I.

South Africa was not invited to the 1964 Games, while its invitation to the 1968 Games was withdrawn after several other African countries threatened to boycott the Games due to apartheid. South Africa would not be permitted to return to the Olympics until 1992.

Rhodesia (now Zimbabwe) was also prevented from entering the 1972 Summer Olympics when its invitation was withdrawn by the International Olympic Committee following protests by other African countries.

Possibly the most famous Olympic boycotts occurred in 1980 and 1984, due to the Soviet invasion in Afghanistan. Iran, Albania and Upper Volta are the only three countries to have boycotted both the 1980 and 1984 Olympics, while Albania and Upper Volta are the only two countries to have boycotted the 1976, 1980 and 1984 Olympics.

In 2021, several nations announced a diplomatic boycott of the 2022 Winter Olympics to protest against Chinese mistreatment of the Uyghur population, thus prohibiting many government officials from attending the games in an official capacity, while still permitting athletes to compete. Later, India joined the boycott over China's decision to choose Qi Fabao, a regimental commander in the People's Liberation Army, as a torchbearer for the event.

== List of full boycotts of an Olympic Games ==
Olympiad	Host City	Host Country	Year	No. boycotts	Boycotting countries	
Olympiad	Host City	Host Country	Year	No. boycotts	List	Map
XVI	Melbourne	Australia	1956	12	1. Cambodia; 2. China; 3. Egypt; 4. Iraq; 5. Lebanon; 6. Liechtenstein; 7. Monaco; 8. Netherlands; 9. Netherlands Antilles; 10. Panama; 11. Spain; 12. Switzerland	Countries boycotting the 1956 Games are shaded blue
XVIII	Tokyo	Japan	1964	3	1. China; 2. Indonesia; 3. North Korea	Countries boycotting the 1964 Games are shaded red
XXI	Montreal	Canada	1976	37	1. Afghanistan; 2. Albania; 3. Algeria; 4. Benin; 5. Burma (Note: Now generally referred to as Myanmar.); 6. Cameroon; 7. Central African Republic; 8. Chad; 9. Republic of China (Note: Boycotted due to not being able to play as "Republic of China".); 10. Congo (Note: Now generally referred to as the Republic of Congo.); 11. Egypt; 12. Ethiopia; 13. Gabon; 14. Gambia; 15. Ghana; 16. Guyana; 17. Iraq; 18. Kenya; 19. Lesotho; 20. Libya; 21. Madagascar; 22. Malawi; 23. Mali; 24. Morocco; 25. Niger; 26. Nigeria; 27. Somalia; 28. Sri Lanka; 29. Sudan; 30. Swaziland (Note: Now generally referred to as Eswatini.); 31. Syria; 32. Tanzania; 33. Togo; 34. Tunisia; 35. Uganda; 36. Upper Volta; 37. Zambia	Countries boycotting the 1976 Games are shaded blue
XXII	Moscow	Soviet Union	1980	68	1. Albania (Note: Albania withdrew from participation at the 1980 and 1984 Summer Olympics without giving any reasons.); 2. Antigua and Barbuda; 3. Argentina; 4. Bahamas; 5. Bahrain; 6. Bangladesh; 7. Barbados; 8. Belize; 9. Bermuda; 10. Bolivia; 11. Canada; 12. Cayman Islands; 13. Central African Republic; 14. Chad; 15. Chile; 16. China; 17. Egypt; 18. El Salvador; 19. Fiji; 20. Gabon; 21. Gambia; 22. West Germany; 23. Ghana; 24. Haiti; 25. Honduras; 26. Hong Kong; 27. Indonesia; 28. Iran (Note: Iran changed its flag on 29 August while the Games were ongoing.); 29. Israel; 30. Ivory Coast; 31. Japan; 32. Kenya; 33. South Korea; 34. Liberia; 35. Liechtenstein; 36. Malawi; 37. Malaysia; 38. Mauritania; 39. Mauritius; 40. Monaco; 41. Morocco; 42. Netherlands Antilles; 43. Niger; 44. Norway; 45. Pakistan; 46. Panama; 47. Papua New Guinea; 48. Paraguay; 49. Philippines; 50. Qatar; 51. Saudi Arabia; 52. Singapore; 53. Somalia; 54. Sudan; 55. Suriname; 56. Swaziland; 57. Chinese Taipei (Note: Taiwan boycotted the 1980 Summer Olympics by protesting the Nagoya Resolution designating it as "Chinese Taipei"); 58. Thailand; 59. Togo; 60. Tunisia; 61. Turkey; 62. United Arab Emirates; 63. United States; 64. United States Virgin Islands; 65. Upper Volta; 66. Uruguay; 67. North Yemen; 68. Zaire (Note: Now generally referred to as the Democratic Republic of Congo.)	
XXIII	Los Angeles	United States	1984	19	1. Afghanistan; 2. Albania; 3. Angola; 4. Bulgaria; 5. Cuba; 6. Czechoslovakia; 7. Ethiopia; 8. East Germany; 9. Hungary; 10. Iran; 11. Laos; 12. Libya; 13. Mongolia; 14. North Korea; 15. Poland; 16. South Yemen; 17. Soviet Union; 18. Upper Volta (Note: Renamed to Burkina Faso on 4 August while the Games were ongoing.); 19. Vietnam	Countries boycotting the 1984 Games are shaded blue
XXIV	Seoul	South Korea	1988	7	1. Albania; 2. Cuba; 3. Ethiopia (Note: Ethiopia announced on January 20, 1988, that it would boycott the 1988 Summer Olympics in solidarity with North Korea, Cuba, Nicaragua, and Madagascar, which had all criticized a decision disallowing North Korea to jointly organize the Games. The Ethiopian NOC said "At a time when the Korean people, who are divided against their will, are struggling for peaceful negotiations, Ethiopia strongly objects to the Olympic Games being conducted in South Korea which further strengthens disunity", adding that Ethiopia would participate "if the decision to keep the games in South Korea were reversed".); 4. North Korea; 5. Madagascar (Note: Madagascar pulled out of the Games at the last minute in support of North Korea.); 6. Nicaragua (Note: Nicaragua announced its intention to boycott on May 20, 1987. Moises Hassan Morales, the Nicaraguan NOC president, stated "if the 1988 Olympics are not carried out in Pyongyang and Seoul, the two Korean capitals, Nicaragua will not attend this event".); 7. Seychelles	Countries boycotting the 1988 Games are shaded blue

== List of non-attendance of government officials or diplomatic boycotts of the Olympic Games ==
The following is the list of countries that did not send official delegations to the Games, but permitted their athletes to participate.

Games	Host City	Host Country	Year	Boycotting countries	
Games	Host City	Host Country	Year	List	Map
XXXII Olympic Summer Olympics	Tokyo	Japan	2020	1. North Korea (Note: North Korea cancelled participation at the 2020 Summer Olympics for medical reasons.)	
XXIV Olympic Winter Games	Beijing	China	2022	1. Lithuania; 2. United States; 3. Australia; 4. United Kingdom; 5. Canada; 6. Kosovo; 7. Belgium; 8. Estonia; 9. Taiwan; 10. Denmark; 11. India	

== Other ==
During the 2014 Winter Paralympics in Russia, the United States and United Kingdom diplomatically boycotted the event, and the entire Ukrainian delegation except for their flagbearer boycotted the opening ceremony due to Russia's annexation of Crimea, and the violation of the Olympic Truce.
