= Brazil–South Korea relations =

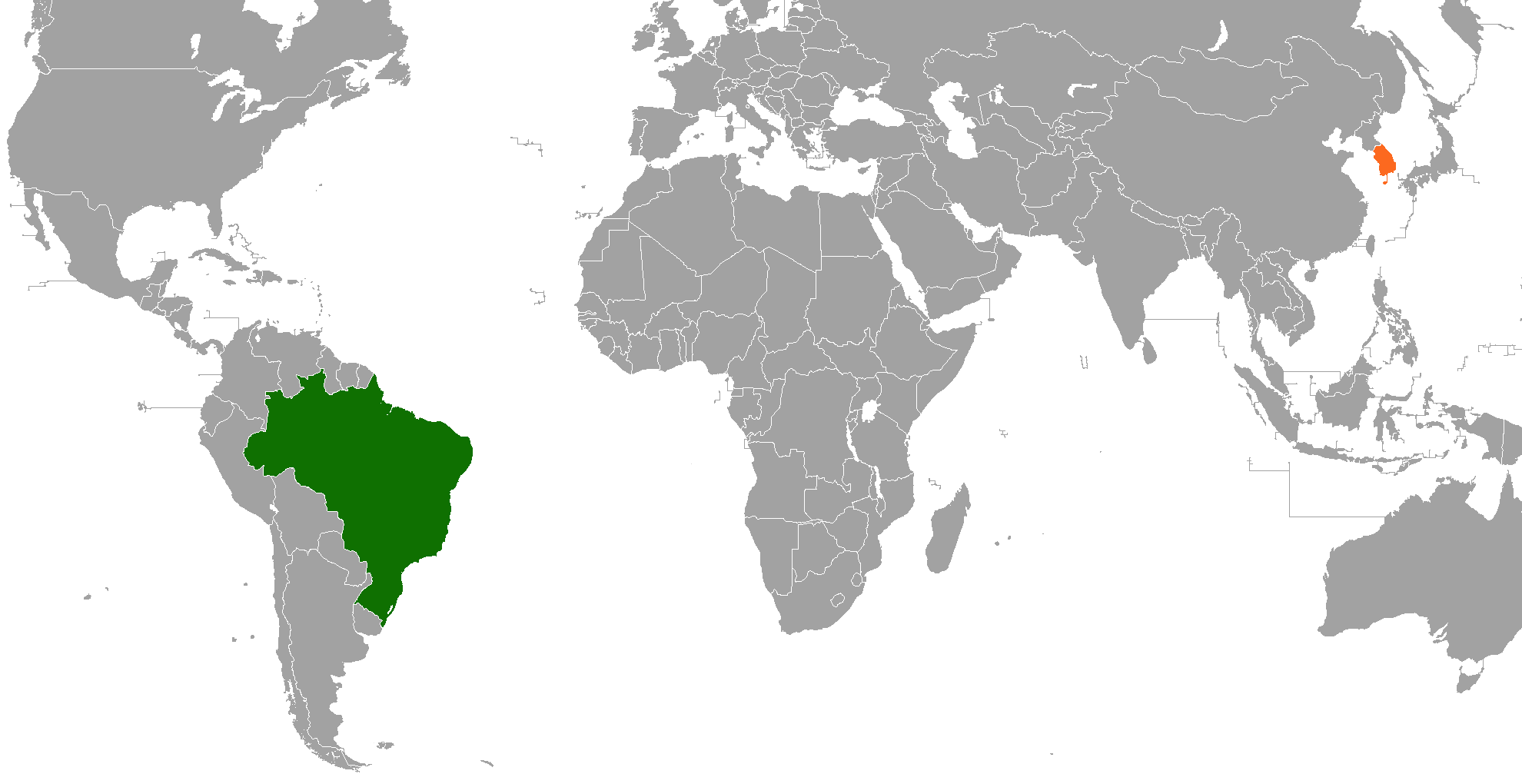
- Brazil: South Korea

Brazil–South Korea relations are the diplomatic relations between the Federative Republic of Brazil and the Republic of Korea. Both nations are members of the G20 and the United Nations.

Brazil and South Korea have maintained multilateral relationships, including various cultural, diplomatic, and economic aspects. Brazil, South Korea's largest investment destination in Latin America, has more than 50,000 Koreans and 120 Korean companies.

== History ==
In October 1959, Brazil and South Korea established diplomatic relations. In 1962, South Korea opened a resident embassy in Rio de Janeiro (its first in Latin America). In 1965, Brazil opened an embassy in Seoul.

In 1962, the first masse migration from the Korean peninsula to Brazil occurred. Officials of the two countries struck a deal intended to ease unemployment in South Korea and develop farmlands in Brazil. Some of the immigrants did start out farming in Brazil when they first arrived, however, many saw no future in that and moved to the cities and became garment peddlers, and eventually began opening garment businesses throughout the country. More than 50,000 Brazilians are of Korean origin.

In 1970, South Korean Prime Minister Baek Du-jin was sent to Brazil as a special envoy on behalf of President Park Chung-hee, paving the way to closer relations between the two nations. In 1996, South Korean President Kim Young-sam became the first South Korean head-of-government to pay an official visit to Brazil.

In January 2001, Brazilian President Fernando Henrique Cardoso became the first Brazilian head-of-government to visit South Korea. While in South Korea, both nations signed an Agreement of Cooperation in the Peaceful uses of Nuclear Energy. There would be several more visits between leaders of both nations.

In May 2018, Brazilian Foreign Minister Aloysio Nunes traveled to Seoul to initiate discussions for a possible Free trade agreement between Mercosur (for which Brazil is a member of) and South Korea. In October 2019, both nations celebrated 60 years of diplomatic relations.

== Economic cooperation ==
In 2023, the Ministry of Trade, Industry and Energy of South Korea and the Ministry of Development, Industry, Trade and Services of Brazil signed the South Korea-Brazil Trade and Investment Promotion Framework (TIPF) in Seoul. This is to strengthen trade relations and investment cooperation between the two countries in the fields of green energy and digital technology.

"We will deepen the economic partnership with Brazil by actively promoting diverse cooperation projects via TIPF."

— Ahn Duk-geun, Minister of Trade, Industry and Energy

== High-level visits ==
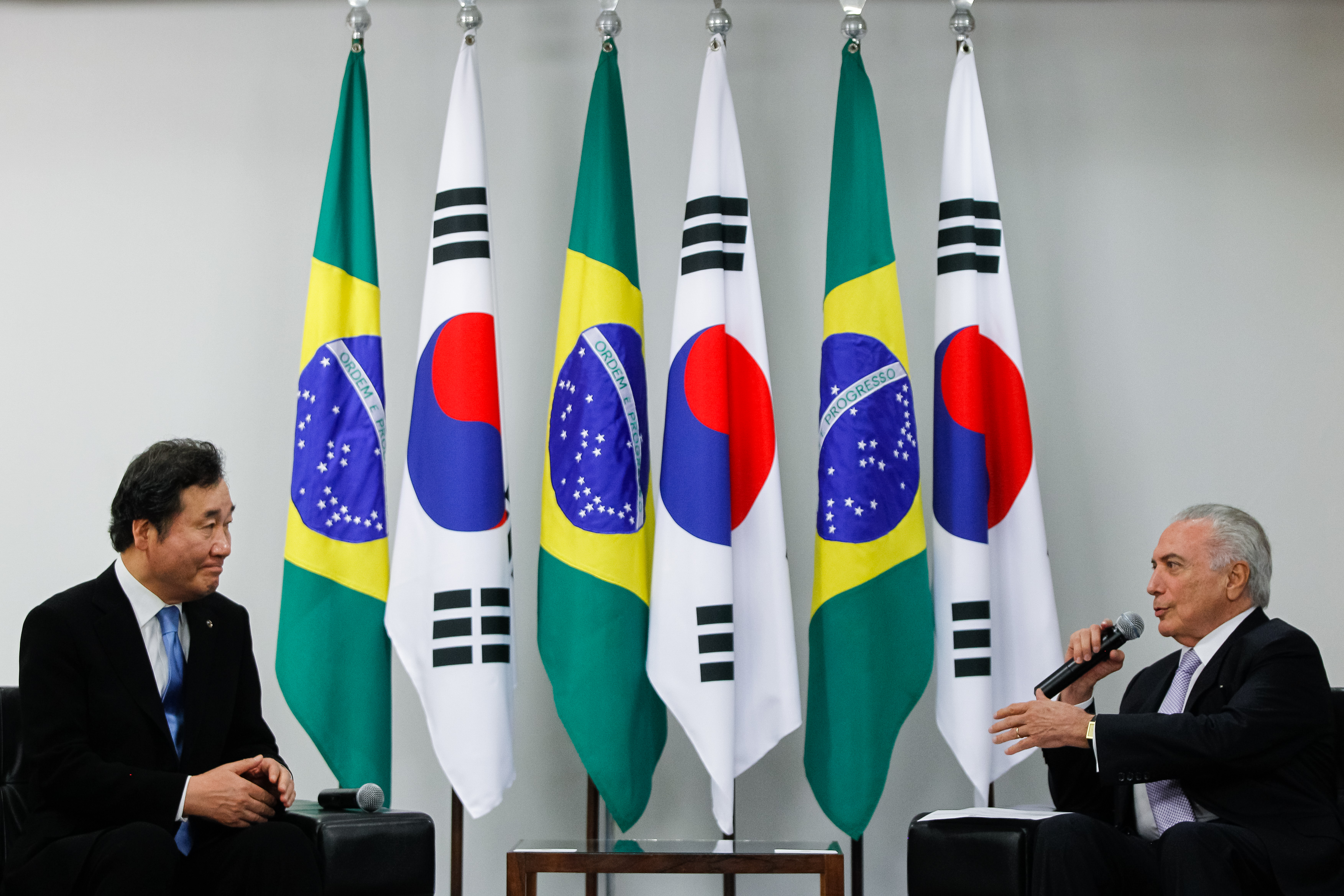
Reunion between Brazilian President Michel Temer and South Korean Prime Minister Lee Nak-yon in New York; 2018.

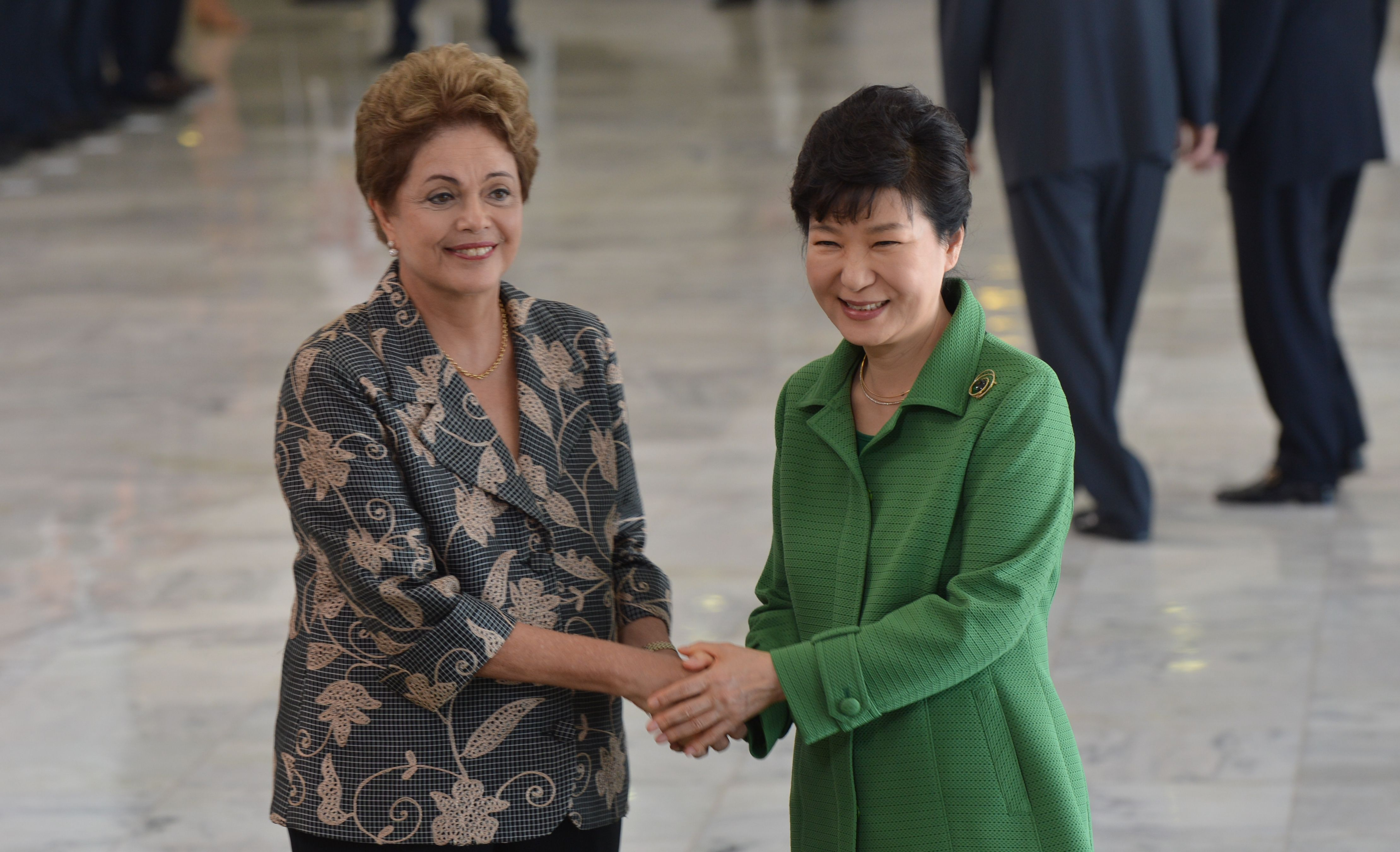
Brazilian President Dilma Rousseff and South Korean President Park Geun-hye; 2015.

High-level visits from Brazil to South Korea

- Foreign Minister Francisco Rezek (1991)
- President Fernando Henrique Cardoso (2001)
- President Luiz Inácio Lula da Silva (2005, 2010)
- Vice President Michel Temer (2012)
- Foreign Minister Aloysio Nunes (2018)

High-level visits from South Korea to Brazil

- Prime Minister Baek Du-jin (1970)
- Foreign Minister Kim Yong-shik (1973)
- Foreign Minister Gong Ro-myung (1995)
- President Kim Young-sam (1996)
- Prime Minister Kim Jong-pil (1999)
- President Roh Moo-hyun (2004)
- President Lee Myung-bak (2008, 2012)
- Prime Minister Kim Hwang-sik (2011)
- Foreign Minister Kim Sung-hwan (2012)
- President Park Geun-hye (2015)
- Prime Minister Lee Nak-yon (2018)

== Bilateral agreements ==
Both nations have signed several bilateral agreements:

- Trade Agreement (1963)
- Agreement for Cultural Cooperation (1966)
- Agreement to Avoid Double Taxation (1987)
- Agreement in Scientific and Technological Cooperation (1991)
- Agreement on Air Transportation (1992)
- Agreement in Tourism Cooperation (1996)
- Agreement of Cooperation in the Peaceful uses of Nuclear Energy (2001)
- Agreement for a Visa Waiver for Touristic Purposes (2001)
- Agreement on Mutual Legal Assistance in Criminal Matters (2002)
- Memorandum of Understanding on Energy and Mineral Resources (2004)
- Memorandum of Understanding establishing the Agricultural Advisory Committee (2005)
- Memorandum of Understanding for Information Technology Cooperation (2005)
- Agreement in Defense Cooperation (2006)
- Agreement in Social Security (2012).

== Resident diplomatic missions ==
- Brazil has an embassy in Seoul.
- South Korea has an embassy in Brasília and a consulate-general in São Paulo.

== See also ==
- Brazil–North Korea relations
- Brazilians in South Korea
- Korean Brazilians
- Foreign relations of South Korea
- Indo-Pacific Strategy of South Korea
- Foreign relations of Brazil
