= Embassy of North Korea, Lima =

Diplomatic mission of North Korea to Peru

Embassy of the Democratic People's Republic of Korea, Lima
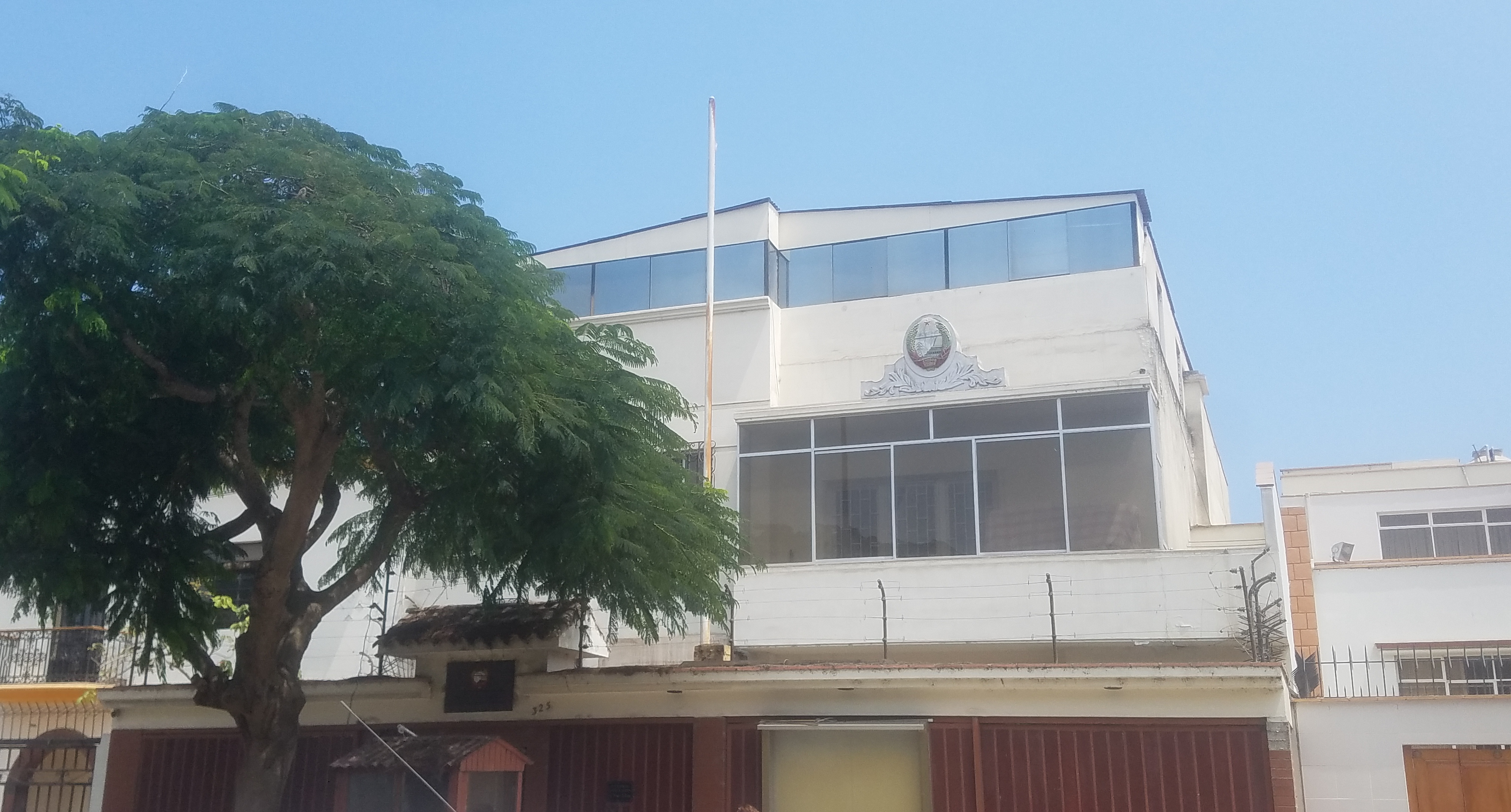
- The former embassy in 2023
- Location: San Isidro District, Lima, Peru
- Address: Calle Guillermo Marconi 325
- Opening: January 1975
- Closed: c. 2018

The Embassy of the Democratic People's Republic of Korea in Lima was the official diplomatic mission of North Korea to the Republic of Peru. It is located in San Isidro District, Lima, Peru.

Diplomatic relations between Peru and North Korea are frozen since 2017, when Peru declared the Korean ambassador as a persona non grata and gave him 5 days to leave the country in response to the country's missile launches earlier that month. This was followed by the expulsion of two more diplomats on December of the same year after reportedly conspiring to attack the families of the diplomatic staff of the U.S. Embassy in Lima.

== History ==
North Korea opened a trade office in Peru in January 1975, under the left-wing government of Juan Velasco Alvarado. Relations were officially established at an embassy level on December 15, 1988.

On December 29, 1977, a member of the commercial delegation was expelled from Peru after being involved in contraband activities. This followed a similar situation developing in October of the same year, when North Korean diplomatic staff were expelled from a number of Scandinavian embassies.

In 1987, the then trade office was bombed by terror group Shining Path. The attack was in response of the North Korean government's support of the Peruvian government against guerrillas during the country's internal conflict, which included the sale of 10,000 AK-47s to be used by the Peruvian National Police. Another attack was attempted in 1989, but the bomb did not detonate as it was defused by the Peruvian Police.

Under Pedro Pablo Kuczynski, the embassy was ordered to decrease its diplomatic staff from six to three people. After the North Korean government conducted nuclear tests in September 2017, the Peruvian government responded by declaring the Korean ambassador as a persona non grata on September 11 and gave him five days to leave the country. The Korean ambassador protested the measure before leaving the embassy. Subsequently, the first and third secretaries of the embassy—Pak Myong Chol and Ji Hyok, respectively—were also given the same treatment on December 22. Nevertheless, the embassy continued to function after the incidents.

After the diplomats' expulsion, Argentine newspaper Infobae revealed the reason behind Kuczynski's ultimatum was that both secretaries kept in touch with leaders of the Red Fatherland Party and had reportedly been planning to attack the families of the diplomatic staff of the U.S. Embassy in Lima, even suggesting their assassination. The information had been discovered by law enforcement as part of an investigation against Pak Myong Hol as part of a sexual harassment complaint filed against him on behalf of a boy under 15 years old. The Red Fatherland Party confirmed that they kept in touch with the diplomatic staff, but denied the allegations made against them. Regardless, two days prior to the expulsion of the two diplomats, the U.S. Embassy had issued a security alert to its staff, seemingly connected to the scandal.

== List of representatives ==
Name	Term begin	Term end	Head of state	Notes
Lee Incheon (이인춘)	November 1989	?	Kim Il Sung	First North Korean ambassador to Peru. He presented his credentials on November 29, 1989.
Kim Gyeong-ho (김경호)	before June 1991	?	Kim Il Sung	Second North Korean ambassador to Peru.
Ji Yong-Ho (지용호)	before 1999	March 2001	Kim Jong Il	Third North Korean ambassador to Peru.
Yoo Chang-woon (유창운)	June 2001	?	Kim Jong Il	Fourth North Korean ambassador to Peru. Also spelled "Yu Chang-un."
Kim Seon-wook (김선욱)	?	?	Kim Jong Il	Fifth North Korean ambassador to Peru.
Ri Mun Gyu (리문규)	March 16, 2009	2013	Kim Jong Il	Sixth ambassador extraordinary and plenipotentiary to Peru. He presented his credentials on March 16, 2009
Kim Hak-chol (김학철)	2013	2017	Kim Jong Un	Seventh and final North Korean ambassador to Peru. He was declared persona non grata and given 5 days to leave Peru in 2017 as a response to missile launches earlier that month, being succeeded by first secretary of the embassy, Pak Myong Hol.

== See also ==
- Embassy of South Korea, Lima
- List of ambassadors of Peru to North Korea
