= Embassy of South Korea, Lima =

Diplomatic mission of South Korea in Peru

Embassy of the Republic of Korea in the Republic of Peru
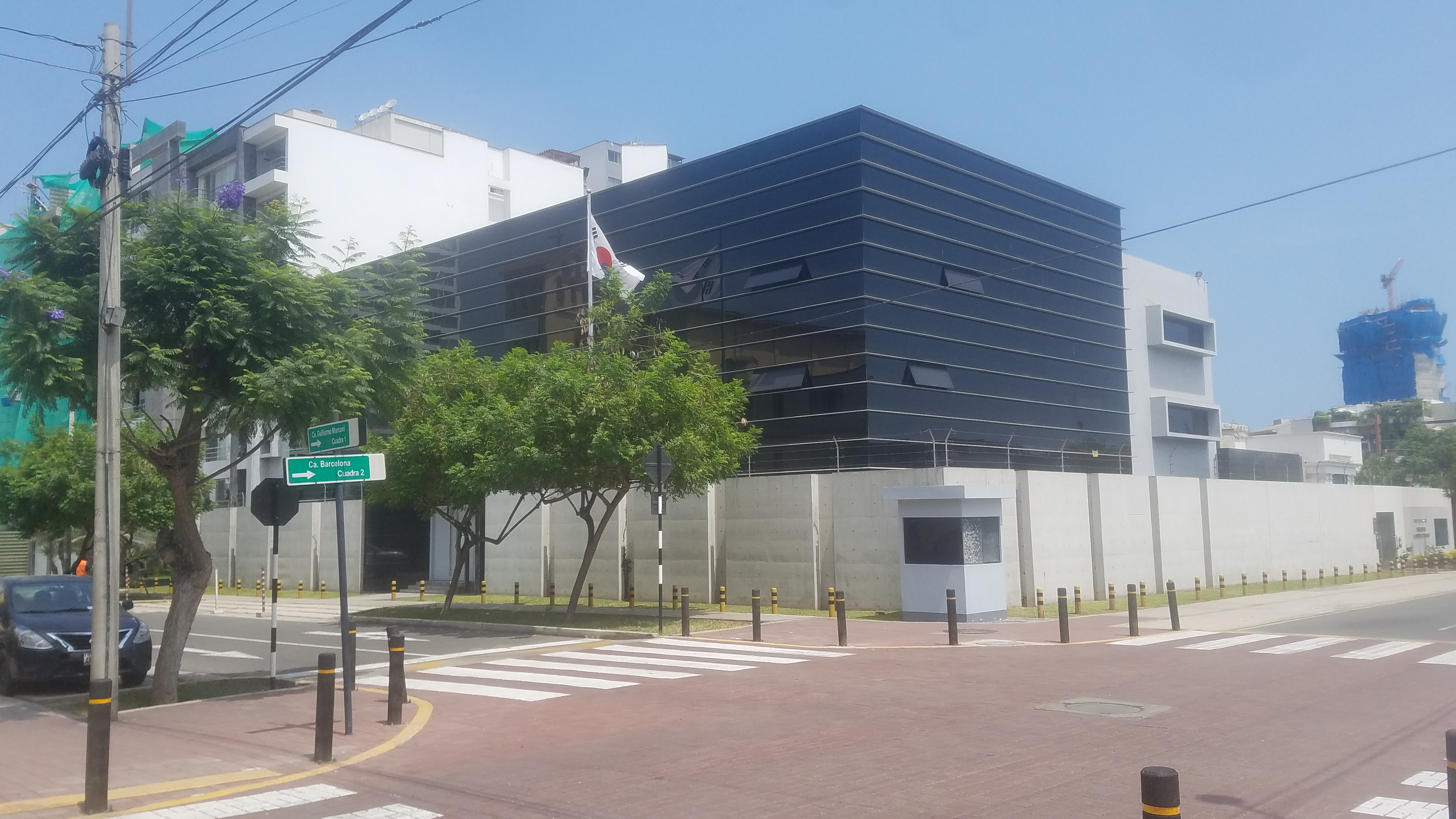
- The embassy in 2023
- Location: San Isidro, Lima, Peru
- Address: Guillermo Marconi 165
- Opened: August 1, 1971
- Website: Official website

The Embassy of the Republic of Korea in the Republic of Peru (Korean: 주페루 대한민국 대사관, Spanish: Embajada de la República de Corea en la República del Perú) represents the permanent diplomatic mission of the Republic of Korea in Peru. It is located at 165 Guillermo Marconi Street, in San Isidro District, Lima.

The current South Korean ambassador is Choi Jong-uk.

== History ==
Peru and South Korea established relations on April 1, 1963. The Korean ambassador to Brazil was initially accredited to Peru, until an embassy in Lima was opened on August 1, 1971.

During the internal conflict in Peru, the embassy was targeted on two occasions: once on September 11, 1987 (alongside police stations and power grids) and a second time on November 23, 1988, albeit unsuccessfully.

The embassy moved at least twice, first being located near Javier Prado Avenue since 1986, and moving to its current location in 2013, opening on November 18.

=== Residence ===
The official residence of the South Korean ambassador is located at 312 Circunvalación del Golf Los Inkas Avenue, in Monterrico, a neighbourhood of Santiago de Surco.

== List of representatives ==
Ambassador of Republic of Korea to the Republic of Peru
- 주 페루 대한민국 특명전권대사
- Emblem of the Republic of Korea
- Ministry of Foreign Affairs
- Style: Mr. Ambassador (informal); His Excellency (diplomatic)
- Reports to: Minister of Foreign Affairs
- Seat: Lima, Peru
- Appointer: The president
- Term length: No fixed term
- Formation: July 15, 2020
- First holder: Park Dong-jin
- Website: Official website (in Spanish)

The ambassador of South Korea to Peru (Korean: 주페루대한민국대사) is the chief diplomatic representative of the Republic of Korea accredited to Peru. The ambassador services the embassy in Lima.

#	Name		Appointment
-	Park Dong-jin (Note: Accredited from Brazil.)	전상진	August 29, 1963 (Note: He presented his credentials on July 21, 1964.)
-	Moon Chang-hwa (Note: As acting ambassador.)	문창화	August 1, 1971
1	Sangjin Jeon	박동진	March 8, 1972
2	Kim In-kwon	김인권	April 3, 1975
3	Yoon Chan	윤 찬	October 24, 1979
4	Jaehun Kim	김재훈	February 16, 1986
5	Taehyun Yoon	윤태현	March 15, 1989
6	Key-sung Cho	조기성	March 28, 1992
7	Lee Won-Young (Note: He was one of the hostages during the Japanese embassy hostage crisis.)	이원영	September 26, 1994
8	Jang-Hee Hong	홍장희	March 21, 1997
9	Park Hee-joo	박희주	March 11, 1999
10	Jung Jinho	정진호	February 27, 2002
11	Younghee Han	한영희	March 2, 2005
12	Byung-Gil Han	한병길	June 26, 2008
13	Park Hee-kwon	박희권	April 15, 2011
14	Geunho Jang (Note: Also written "Keun Ho Jang.")	장근호	May 16, 2014
15	Junhyeok Joon (Note: Also written "June-Hyuck Cho")	조준혁	November 16, 2017
16	Yung-Joon Jo	조영준	July 15, 2020
17	Choi Jong-uk	최종욱	July 13, 2023

== See also ==
- Embassy of North Korea, Lima
- List of ambassadors of Peru to South Korea
