= Brazil–North Korea relations =

- Brazil: North Korea

Diplomatic mission
- Embassy of Brazil, Pyongyang: Embassy of North Korea, Brasília

Brazil–North Korea relations are the current and historical bilateral relations between Brazil and North Korea. Brazil has an embassy in Pyongyang and North Korea has an embassy in Brasília.

According to a 2013 BBC World Service Poll, 22% of Brazilians view North Korea's influence positively, with 47% expressing a negative view.

== History ==
Prior to the establishment of bilateral relations, the North Korean government reportedly supported guerrilla groups that fought against the Brazilian military dictatorship, such as Ação Libertadora Nacional and Vanguarda Popular Revolucionária, between 1968 and 1971. In November of 1970, a training camp was established in Porto Alegre, although it is also alleged that a smaller group trained within North Korea itself.

Relations were formally established in January 2001 under the governments of Fernando Henrique Cardoso and Kim Jong Il. The North Korean embassy in Brasília was inaugurated in 2005, and the first resident ambassador, Pak Hyok, presented his credentials in November of the same year. Four years later, Brazil's embassy in Pyongyang was opened in May 2009.

Despite the Brazilian government's economic relations with North Korea, it has generally condemned controversial North Korean actions that threaten stability in East Asia, such as the 2009 North Korean nuclear test, upon which the Brazilian Ministry for Foreign Affairs stated that the Brazilian Government vehemently condemns North Korea's nuclear test and urged the country to sign the Comprehensive Test Ban Treaty and return to the six-party talks as soon as possible, and the ROKS Cheonan sinking in 2010, upon which the Brazilian Ministry of External Relations issued a statement saying the government expresses solidarity with South Korea and urged stability on the Korean Peninsula.

Since July 2016, the embassy in Brasília has not been staffed by an ambassador, but rather a chargé d'affaires. Later that year, North Korea took part in the Rio 2016 Olympics, suggesting better stability between the two countries.

== See also ==
- Foreign relations of Brazil
- Foreign relations of North Korea
- Brazil–South Korea relations
