= Forum of East Asia–Latin America Cooperation =

Forum of East Asia–Latin America Cooperation Foro de Cooperación Asia Oriental–América Latina
- Headquarters: Seoul
- Working languages: English and Spanish
- Type: Regional forum
- Membership: East Asia: Australia; Brunei; Cambodia; China; Indonesia; Japan; Laos; Malaysia; Mongolia; Myanmar; New Zealand; Philippines; Singapore; South Korea; Thailand; Vietnam; Latin America: Argentina; Bolivia; Brazil; Chile; Colombia; Costa Rica; Cuba; Dominican Republic; Ecuador; El Salvador; Guatemala; Honduras; Mexico; Nicaragua; Panama; Paraguay; Peru; Suriname; Uruguay; Venezuela
- Establishment: 1999
- Website www.fealac.org

The Forum for East Asia–Latin America Cooperation (FEALAC; Spanish: Foro de Cooperación Asia Oriental–América Latina, FCAOAL) is a regional forum of 36 countries constituting the region of East and Southeast Asia (Far East), Oceania, and Latin America that came together to form an official and regular dialogue channel between the two regions.

== History ==
East Asia and Latin America are both composed of developing countries and are economically dynamic and complementary to each other. They follow the global trend of regional cooperation; the need for intercontinental cooperation between East Asia and Latin America arose because there was no official cooperative mechanism bridging the two regions. In 1998, a concrete proposal to enhance the relations of the two regions was initiated by the former Singaporean Prime Minister Goh Chok Tong. Subsequently, the East Asia-Latin America Forum Senior Officials meeting was held in Singapore in 1998, marking the beginning of the organization. (Note: SG Foreign Affairs)

== Member states ==
Latin American Group

Latin America

- Argentina
- Bolivia
- Brazil
- Chile
- Colombia
- Costa Rica
- Cuba
- Dominican Republic
- Ecuador
- El Salvador
- Guatemala
- Honduras
- Mexico
- Nicaragua
- Panama
- Paraguay
- Peru
- Uruguay
- Venezuela

Others

- Suriname

East Asian Group

East and Southeast Asia

- Brunei
- Cambodia
- China
- Indonesia
- Japan
- Laos
- Malaysia
- Mongolia
- Myanmar
- Philippines
- Singapore
- South Korea
- Thailand
- Vietnam

Oceania

- Australia
- New Zealand

== See also ==
- ASEAN Free Trade Area
- Community of Latin American and Caribbean States
- Organisation of African, Caribbean and Pacific States
- Pacific Islands Forum
- Small Island Developing States
- Union of South American Nations
