= 1899 in Nordic music =

The following is a list of notable events that occurred in the year 1899 in Nordic music.

== Events ==
- 25 January – Swedish aristocrat Baron Rolf Cederström (1870–1947) marries world-famous operatic soprano Adelina Patti, who is thirty years his senior.
- 8 April – Andreas Hallén's opera Waldemarsskatten, with a libretto by Axel von Klinkowström, is premièred at the Royal Swedish Opera.
- 26 April – Jean Sibelius's Symphony No. 1 in E minor is premièred by the Helsinki Orchestral Society. This version has not survived.

== New works ==
- Hugo Alfvén – Symphony No. 2 in D
- Tor Aulin – 4 Aquarellen for Violin and Piano, Op. 12 or 15
- Agathe Backer Grøndahl – Sommer, Op. 50
- Axel Gade – Concerto No. 2 for violin and orchestra in F major
- Johan Halvorsen – Norwegian Festival Overture
- Erkki Melartin
  - 2 Ballades, Op. 5
  - 3 Piano Pieces, Op. 8
- Jean Sibelius – Finlandia
- Christian Sinding – 6 Klavierstücke, Op. 49

== Popular music ==
- Jean Sibelius – "Song of the Athenians"
- Alice Tegnér – "Kring julgranen"

== Births ==
- 2 March – Harald Agersnap, Danish pianist, cellist, conductor and composer (died 1982)
- 10 March – Finn Høffding, Danish composer (died 1997)
- 29 April – Yngve Sköld, Swedish pianist and composer (died 1992)
- 1 May – Jón Leifs, Icelandic pianist, conductor and composer (died 1968)
- 9 June – Signe Amundsen, Norwegian operatic soprano (died 1987)
- 20 July – Sven Sköld, Swedish conductor and film composer (died 1956)
- 23 September – Odd Grüner-Hegge, Norwegian conductor (died 1973).
- 13 October – Einar Fagstad, Norwegian accordionist, singer and composer (died 1961).
- 29 November – Arvid Kleven, Norwegian flautist and composer (died 1929).

== Deaths ==
- 4 February – Eduard Holst, Danish composer, playwright, actor, dancer and dance master (born 1843)
- 22 March – Anna Henriette Levinsohn, Danish operatic soprano (born 1839)
- 16 June – August Winding, Danish pianist and composer (born 1843)
- 17 August – Erik Bøgh, Danish journalist, playwright and songwriter (born 1822)
- 22 October – Ernst Mielck, Finnish composer (born 1877; tuberculosis)

== See also ==
- 1899 in Denmark
- 1899 in Norwegian music
- 1899 in Sweden
