= 1997 in Nordic music =

The following is a list of notable events and releases that happened in Nordic music in 1997.

== Events ==
- 21 March – On the first day of Norway's Vossajazz festival, Frank Jakobsen wins the festival prize
- 3 May – At the Eurovision Song Contest in Dublin, Ireland, Sweden (14th) is the highest-placed of the Scandinavian countries. Denmark finishes 16th and Iceland 20th. Norway finishes in 24th place, earning no points.
- 28–29 June – David Bowie, Prodigy, Skunk Anansie, Nick Cave and Unni Wilhelmsen appear at the final Kalvøyafestivalen in Norway.
- 8 July – Finnish baritone Jorma Hynninen plays the title role in the première of Einojuhani Rautavaara's opera Aleksis Kivi, written at the request of Hynninen himself, at the Savonlinna Opera Festival.
- unknown date – Mikael Åkerfeldt and Peter Lindgren of the Swedish band Opeth dismiss bassist Johan De Farfalla without informing band member Anders Nordin, who decides to leave the band.

== Classical works ==
- Magnus Lindberg
  - Feria
  - Fresco
- Jaakko Mäntyjärvi – Canticum Calamitatis Maritimae

== Film and television scores ==
- Gunner Møller Pedersen – Barbara

== Top hit singles ==
- Aqua – "Barbie Girl" (#1 Norway, Sweden, Australia, Belgium, France, Germany, Ireland, Switzerland, UK)
- Björk
  - "Bachelorette" (#6 Iceland)
  - "Jóga" (#1 Iceland; #16 Finland)
- Blond – "Bara hon älskar mig" (#7 Sweden)
- Per Gessle – "Do You Wanna Be My Baby?" (#1 Sweden)
- Klamydia – "Perseeseen" (#1 Finland)
- Kølig Kaj – "Stemmen i mit liv" (#4 Denmark)
- Neljä baritonia – "Pop-musiikkia" (#1 Finland)
- Jari Sillanpää – "Bum Bum Bum" (#8 Finland)
- Tehosekoitin – "C'mon baby yeah" (#1 Finland)
- Tiggy – "Ring A Ling" (#1 Denmark)

== Eurovision Song Contest ==
- Denmark in the Eurovision Song Contest 1997
- Iceland in the Eurovision Song Contest 1997
- Norway in the Eurovision Song Contest 1997
- Sweden in the Eurovision Song Contest 1997

== Births ==
- 26 March – Glowie, Icelandic singer
- 11 August – Saba, Danish singer and musical theatre actress
- 24 August – Alan Walker, British-born Norwegian DJ and record producer
- 16 December – Zara Larsson, Swedish singer and songwriter

== Deaths ==
- 7 February – Allan Edwall, Swedish actor, director, author, singer and composer (born 1924)
- 3 March – Finn Høffding, Danish composer (born 1899)
- 23 March – Arnljot Kjeldaas, Norwegian organist and composer (born 1916)
- 7 April – Egil Harder, Danish concert pianist and composer (born 1917)
- 16 June – Rolf Ericson, Swedish jazz trumpeter (born 1922)
- 22 June – Ted Gärdestad, Swedish singer, songwriter and actor (born 1956; suicide)
- 12 September – Stig Anderson, Swedish music manager and publisher (born 1931; heart attack)
- 29 September – Sven-Eric Johanson, Swedish composer (born 1919)
- 30 November – Alfred Næss, Norwegian playwright and songwriter (born 1927)
- 10 December — Karsten Andersen, Norwegian conductor (born 1920)
