= 1843 in music =

== Events ==
- February 6 – The Virginia Minstrels perform the first minstrel show (Bowery Amphitheatre, New York City).
- May 22 – Gottfried Kinkel marries fellow musician Johanna Mockel.
- November 13 – Gaetano Donizetti's next-to-last opera Dom Sébastien is premiered at the Paris Opera.
- November 27 – Michael William Balfe's The Bohemian Girl is premiered in London at the Theatre Royal, Drury Lane, with Abigail Betts in the role of the Gypsy Queen.
- December 26 – Following the première of his last opera, Hernani, Alberto Mazzucato retires from composing in order to become a full-time music teacher.
- Approximate date – The Euphonium is invented, under the name of the Sommerophone.
- August Conradi becomes organist of the Invalidenhaus, Berlin.
- Hector Berlioz writes Grand traité d'instrumentation et d'orchestration modernes, Op. 10

== Popular music ==
- "Columbia, the Gem of the Ocean" by Thomas Becket
- "I Dreamt I Dwelt in Marble Halls" w. Alfred Bunn m. Michael William Balfe from the light opera The Bohemian Girl
- "Old Dan Tucker", usually attributed to Dan Emmett
- "Then You'll Remember Me" w. Alfred Bunn m. Michael William Balfe from the light opera The Bohemian Girl

== Classical music ==
- Dionisio Aguado – Nuevo método para guitarra, Op. 6
- Ernesto Cavallini – Concert Fantasia on motives from 'La sonnambula'
- Frédéric Chopin
  - Impromptu No. 3 in G-flat major, opus 51
  - Ballade No. 4 in F minor, opus 52
  - Mazurkas, Op.56, p. 115
  - Waltz in A minor, B.150
  - Moderato in E major, B.151
- August Conradi – Symphony No. 1
- Carl Czerny – 8 Nocturnes romantiques de différents caractères, Op.604
- Carl Filtsch
  - Premières pensées musicales, Op.3
  - Overture for orchestra in D major
- Niels Gade – Symphony No. 2
- Miska Hauser – Mes adieux a Varsovie, Op.5
- Johanna Kinkel – 6 Lieder, Op.18
- Sebastian Lee – 40 Études mélodiques et progressives, Op.31
- Franz Liszt
  - Album Leaf in E major S.166a
  - Ländler in A-flat major, S.211
  - Gaudeamus igitur, S.240
  - Canzone Napolitana, S.248
  - Il m'aimait tant, S.271
  - Die Zelle in Nonnenwerth, S.274
  - Es war ein König in Thule, S.278
  - Der du von dem Himmel bist, S.279
  - Die tote Nachtigall, S.291
  - Réminiscences de 'Robert le diable', S.413
- Hans Christian Lumbye
  - Tivolis Rutschbane Galop (dated August 11)
  - Tivolis Damp-Caroussellbane Galop (dated August 26)
  - Tivolis Gondol Galop (dated September 3)
- Felix Mendelssohn
  - Cello Sonata No. 2 in D major, Op. 58
  - Die erste Walpurgisnacht, secular cantata, opus 60 (première in Leipzig, February 2)
- Joachim Raff – 4 Galop-caprices, Op.5
- Robert Schumann − Paradise and the Peri, secular oratorio, opus 50 (premiere in Leipzig, December)
- Johann Strauss – Lorelei Rhein Klänge op. 154 ("Echoes of the Rhine Loreley")
- Pauline Viardot – Album de Mme. Viardot-Garcia

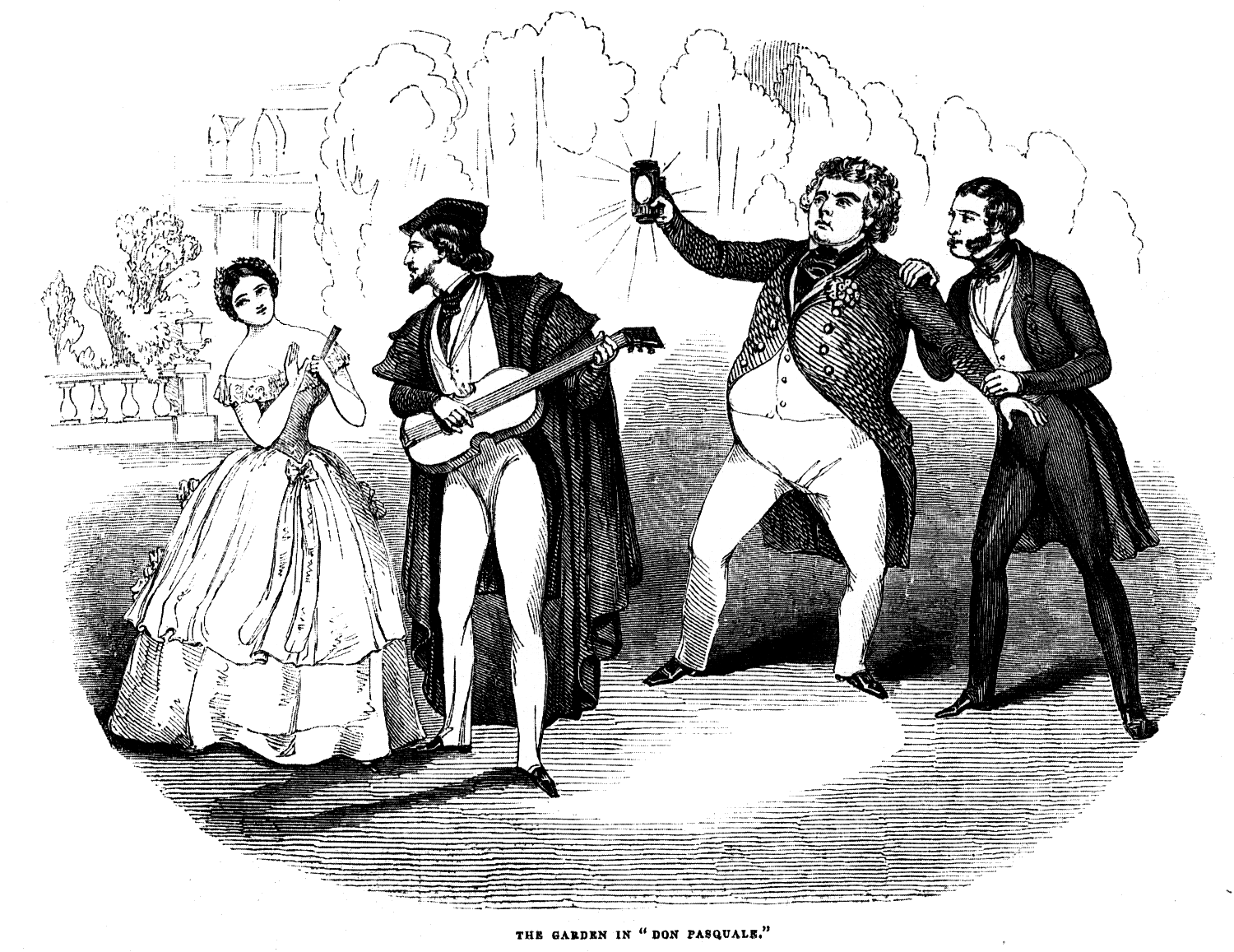
London debut of "Don Pasquale"

== Opera ==
- Julius Benedict – The Bride of Venice
- Gaetano Donizetti – Don Pasquale
- Giovanni Pacini – Medea
- Giuseppe Verdi – I Lombardi
- Richard Wagner – The Flying Dutchman
- Fromental Halévy – Charles VI, premiered March 15 in Paris

== Births ==
- January 22 – Caroline Montigny-Rémaury, pianist (died 1913)
- February 4 – John Comfort Fillmore, American music educator, organist, arranger, and ethnomusicologist (died 1898)
- February 6 – Frederic William Henry Myers, lyricist (died 1901)
- February 10 – Adelina Patti, soprano (died 1919)
- February 14 – Louis Diémer, pianist (died 1919)
- February 24 – Violet Fane, lyricist (died 1905)
- February 25 – Narciso Serradell, Mexican composer (died 1910)
- March 6 – Arthur Napoleão dos Santos, Brazilian pianist and composer, instrument dealer and music publisher (died 1925)
- March 16
  - Louis Gregh, composer and publisher (died 1915)
  - Gustave Sandré, composer (died 1916)
- April 4 – Dr. Hans Richter, conductor (died 1916)
- April 8 – Asger Hamerik, composer (died 1923)
- May 2 – Karl Michael Ziehrer, Austrian composer and bandmaster (died 1922)
- May 20 – Miguel Marqués, Spanish composer and violinist (died 1918)
- May 29 – Émile Pessard, French composer (died 1917)
- June 13 – Adolf Neuendorff, German-American composer, conductor, pianist and violinist (died 1897)
- June 15 – Edvard Grieg, Norwegian composer (died 1907)
- June 16 – David Popper, cellist and composer (died 1913)
- June 19 – Charles Edouard Lefebvre, French composer (died 1917)
- June 20 – Fyodor Stravinsky, opera singer and father of Igor Stravinsky (died 1902)
- July 9 – Ralph E. Hudson, American hymnwriter (died 1901)
- August 4 – Flor van Duyse, Belgian composer and musicologist (died 1910)
- August 5 – James Scott Skinner, Scottish dancing master, violinist, fiddler, and composer (died 1927)
- August 20 – Christina Nilsson, operatic soprano (died 1921)
- August 26 – Georg August Lumbye, Danish composer, son of Hans Christian Lumbye (died 1922)
- September 4 – Ján Levoslav Bella, Slovak composer (died 1936)
- November 2 –
  - Elek Erkel, Hungarian composer, son of Ferenc Erkel (died 1893)
  - Caryl Florio, composer (died 1920)
- November 16 – George Hendrik Witte, composer (died 1929)
- November 28 – Émile Bernard, French composer and organist (died 1902)
- November 29 – Eloi Sylva, Belgian operatic tenor (died 1919)
- December 3 – Franz Xaver Neruda, Danish cellist and composer (died 1915)
- December 13 – George Stephanescu, Romanian composer (died 1925)
- December 22 – Julius Bechgaard, Danish composer (died 1917)
- date unknown – Eduard Holst, Danish composer

== Deaths ==
- January 7 – Franz Schoberlechner, pianist (born 1797)
- January 11
  - Auguste Andrade, singer (born 1793)
  - Antoine Bournonville, dancer, singer and actor, 82
  - Francis Scott Key, poet and songwriter, 63
- March 9 – Christian August Pohlenz, conductor and composer, 52
- April 14 – Josef Lanner, Viennese composer, 42 (typhoid)
- May 3 – Franz Xaver Gebel, conductor, composer and music teacher, 55 or 56
- May 4 – Eduard Rottmanner, organist and composer, 33
- May 12 – Johann Georg Lickl, composer and piano teacher, 74
- May 13 – Agnes Franz, lyricist, 49
- June 29 – Therese Jansen Bartolozzi, pianist (born c.1770)
- July – Nehemiah Shumway, composer of sacred music, 81
- July 9 – Karoline Pichler, lyricist (born 1769)
- July 24 – Carl Julius Adolph Hugo Hoffmann, composer (born 1801)
- July 29 – Domenico Reina, operatic and bel canto tenor, 47
- August 29 – Charles Jane Ashley, cellist and secretary of the Royal Society of Musicians, 70
- date unknown
  - Knut Luraas, Hardingfele fiddler (born 1782)
