= Symphony No. 9 (Pettersson) =

1970 composition by Allan Pettersson

- by Allan Pettersson
- Composed: 1970: Stockholm
- Dedication: "For the Gothenburg Symphony Orchestra and its chief conductor Sergiu Comissiona"
- Duration: 69:00 – 85:00
- Movements: 1

Premiere
- Date: 18 February 1971:
- Location: Gothenburg
- Conductor: Sergiu Comissiona
- Performers: Gothenburg Symphony Orchestra

Allan Pettersson wrote his Symphony No. 9 in 1970.

== History ==
The symphony is his last composition preceding a nine-month stay in Karolinska Hospital in Stockholm (starting September 1970); Pettersson composed the symphony in less than half a year.

== Structure ==
It is Pettersson's longest symphony with a duration of ca. 70–85 minutes (score: 65–70 minutes). (Note: the average length in the commercial recordings so far is around 70 minutes. Exception is the Comissiona recording with ca. 84 minutes (Comissiona: 83'58, Francis: 69'52, Lindberg: 70'11).) There is one movement, though it divides into a number of smaller sections that follow each other with at most a nominal pause, but usually none. (Note: The notes to the cpo recording identify 17 such sections, partially for analysis. Meyer: "The tracks are in no way to be understood as separate movements but do represent attempts to identify breaks or turning points in the score.") (Note: The BIS recording is divided in 9 sections.)

== Music ==
Much though not all of the material in the symphony is based on the ascending (and later descending) chromatic scale motif heard at the very beginning, played by bassoons, violas and cellos. Additional material is a repeated-note figure. Pettersson juxtaposes innocent, diatonic melodies with passages of great contrapuntal ferocity. There are sections of tango and canon and also a quotation of Song No. 10 "Jungfrun och Ljugarpust" (The Maiden and the Lying Wind) from his Barefoot Songs. The Ninth can be described as an extended struggle in which harmony is the ultimate winner. The concluding bars of the symphony (Note: cpo recording, track 17, from three measures before rehearsal 208 in the score to the end – about 5 minutes) consist of a long final melody (in Peter Ruzicka's terms: a "Canto") played by violins and cellos and later by the violas in unison, and ends in a slow peaceful plagal cadence into F major.

Paul Rapoport uses adjectives like vast, nightmarish and delirious to characterize the symphony. The symphony is a natural, organic unity and demanding for musicians and listeners.

== Performances ==
Pettersson dedicated the symphony to Sergiu Comissiona and the Gothenburg Symphony, who premiered it on 18 February 1971 and had commissioned it for the 350th Anniversary of the Founding of the City of Gothenburg. It was played again in December 1974, and the first Stockholm performances were given on 25 and 26 May 1976. Comissiona described later the Ninth as "Jupiter" among Pettersson's symphonies.

== Score ==
The miniature score was published in 1989 by Nordiska Musikforlaget of Stockholm and runs to 385 pages and 2146 bars.

== Recordings ==
- Sergiu Comissiona, conductor, Gothenburg Symphony; on Philips 2-LP set 6767 951, 1978. OCLC 604049544
- Alun Francis, conductor, Deutsches Symphonie-Orchester Berlin; on cpo 999 231–2, 1994. OCLC 1011485081
- Christian Lindberg, conductor, Norrköping Symphony Orchestra; on BIS 2038, 2013. OCLC 883802421
