= Anders Larsson (singer) =

Swedish baritone (born 1969)

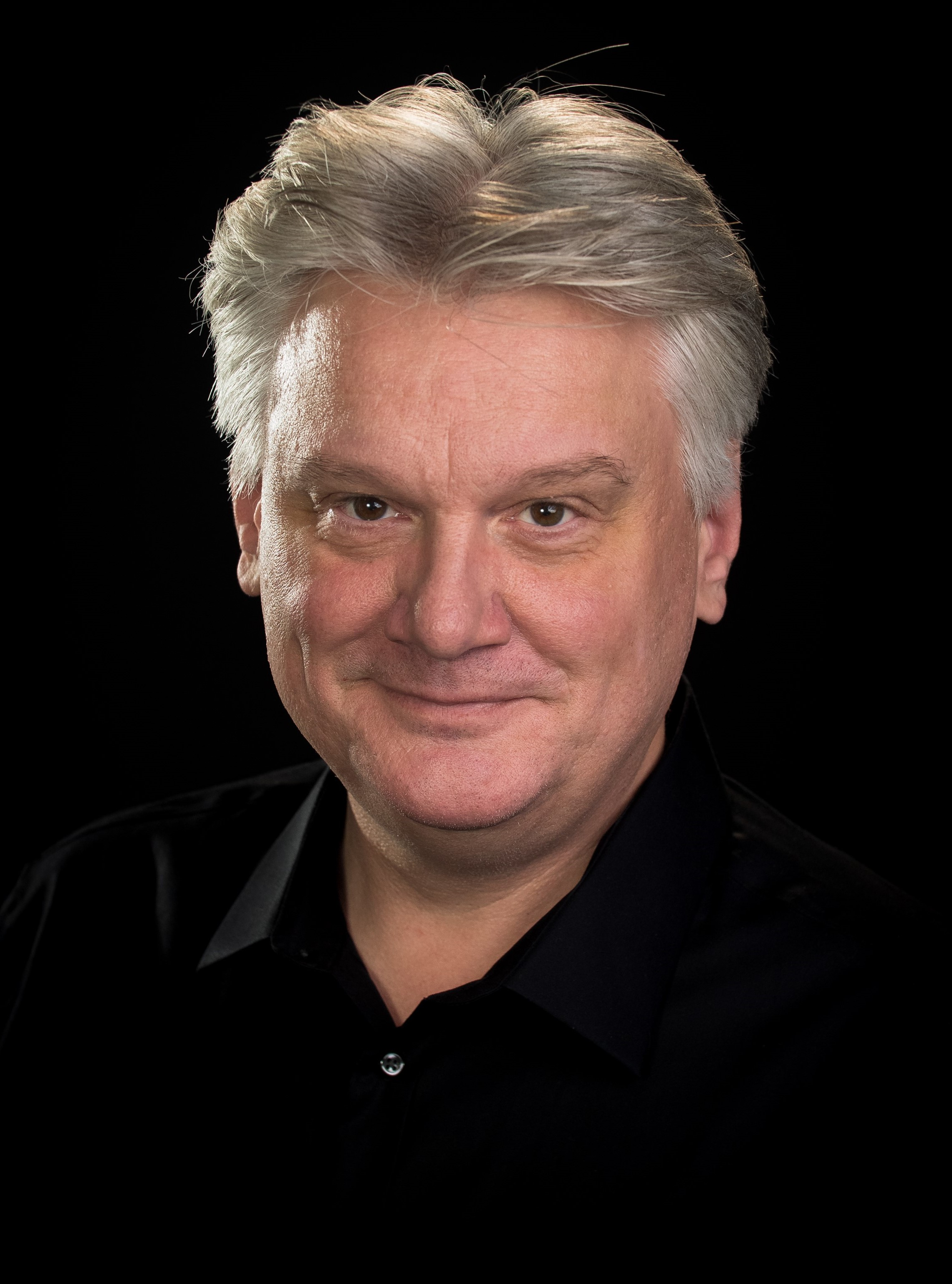
- Born: Jöns Olof Anders Larsson; 24 April 1969 (age 57); Östersund, Sweden
- Occupation: Operatic baritone

Anders Larsson (born 24 April 1969) is a Swedish operatic baritone. He received Birgit Nilsson’s Grant in 1992. While studying at the Royal Swedish Academy of Music (Stockholm), Anders Larsson joined the Gothenburg Opera House in 1994 and was the first prize winner of the Swedish Placido Domingo National Contest. Gian Carlo Menotti selected him to sing Eugene Onegin at the Spoleto Festival dei Due Mondi 1996 and the next year Anders was Sweden’s representative in BBC Cardiff Singer of the World 1997. Anders Larsson was 1999 invited to the La Monnaie, Brussels, Belgium to sing Pelléas in Debussy’s Opera Pelléas et Mélisande conducted by George Benjamin and 2001 to the Glyndebourne Festival Opera, England to sing the Count Almaviva in Mozart’s The Marriage of Figaro. In 2007 he sang Mandryka in Christof Loy's fantastic new production of Arabella with Nina Stemme at Gothenburg Opera House 2007.

Anders Larsson has sung leading roles as a guest artist with several other important theatres and Orchestras internationally, including the Frankfurt Opera (Germany), the Royal Danish Theatre, Gran Teatre del Liceu (Spain), Barbican Hall in London, Berlin Opera (Germany), Teatro Real (Spain), Minnesota Orchestra and San Francisco Symphony Orchestra, Philharmonie Luxembourg to name just a few.

== Selected recordings ==
- Claude Debussy, Pelléas et Mélisande. Anders Larsson, Juanita Lascarro, José van Dam, Anne Gjevang, Donald McIntyre, Conducted by George Benjamin (1999). Bruxelles CD5337 (www.operapassion.com).
- Luca Francesconi, Ballata. Anders Larsson (Young Mariner), Conducted by Ono Kazushi. La Monnaei, Bruxelles. Stradivarius, Ricordi oggi (2011).
- Andreas Hallén, Waldemarsskatten. Conducted by B. Tommy Andersson. Swedish Radio Orchestra, Stockholm. Sterling Records (2023).
- Larsson, Förklädd gud/Den Heliga natten, Conducted by Petter Sundkvist, NAXOS 1996.
- Allan Pettersson, Åtta barfotasånger with Nordic Chamber Orchestra. Anders Larsson, Conducted by Christian Lindberg BIS (2009).
- Richard Strauss, Ariadne auf Naxos. Jane Eaglen, Villars, Makarina, Fox, Donose, Pescevich, Peterson, Anders Larsson (Harlekin). Conducted by Jeffrey Tate and Minnesota Orchestra (1999) CD656 (www.operapassion.com).
- Richard Wagner, Lohengrin. Goran Jurić, Michael König, Catherine Naglestad, Dolora Zajick and Anders Larsson. Conducted by Hartmut Haenchen. Teatro Real, Madrid 2014. CD1000000 (www.operapassion.com).

== Repertoire ==
Larsson´s repertoire includes:

Year (debut)	Composer	Opera	Role	Location
2009	Ludwig van Beethoven	Fidelio	Don Fernando	Gran Teatre del Liceu
2001	Vincenzo Bellini	Il Pirata	Ernesto	
2009	Daniel Börtz	Den döves hus	Goya	Gothenburg opera house
2004	Daniel Börtz	Hans namn var Orestes	Orestes	Royal Stockholm Philharmonic Orchestra
1996	Georges Bizet	Carmen	Escamillo	Gothenburg opera house
2004	Ernest Bloch	MacBeth	Mac Duff	Oper Frankfurt
1999	Claude Debussy	Pelléas et Mélisande	Pelléas	La Monnaie
2004	Gaetano Donizetti	L'elisir d'amore	Belcore	Royal Swedish Opera
2016	Gaetano Donizetti	Lucrezia Borgia	Alfonso	Malmö Opera
2002	Luca Francesconi	Ballata	Young Mariner	La Monnaie
2010	Charles Gounod	Faust	Valentin	Folkoperan
2001	Andreas Hallén	Waldemarsskatten	Waldemar Atterdag	Swedish Radio Orchestra
1999	Joseph Haydn	Orfeo ed Euridice	Creonte	Nationale Reisopera
2016	Erich Wolfgang Korngold	Die Tote Stadt	Fritz	
2002	Ruggero Leoncavallo	I Pagliacci	Silvio	La Monnaie
1998	Ingvar Lidholm	Ett drömspel	Officeren	Royal Stockholm Philharmonic Orchestra
2017	Bohuslav Martinů	The Greek Passion	Kostandis	
1992	Pietro Mascagni	Cavalleria rusticana	Alfio	
2001	Wolfgang Amadeus Mozart	Le Nozze di Figaro	Il Conte Almaviva	Glyndebourne Opera Festival
1996	Wolfgang Amadeus Mozart	Così fan tutte	Guglielmo	Gothenburg opera house
1995	Wolfgang Amadeus Mozart	Die Zauberflöte	Papageno	
2003	Jacques Offenbach	The Tales of Hoffmann	Lindorf, Coppélius, Miracle, Dapertutto	Royal Swedish Opera
2026	Matthew Peterson	Anders och Emma Zorn	Herman Lamm	
1995	Giacomo Puccini	Madama Butterfly	Yamadori	Gothenburg opera house
2026	Giacomo Puccini	Tosca	Baron Scarpia	Folkoperan
1996	Giacomo Puccini	Tosca	Il Sagrestano	Gothenburg opera house
1998	Giacomo Puccini	La Bohéme	Marcello	Gothenburg opera house
2005	Giacomo Puccini	Manon Lescaut	Lescaut	Royal Swedish Opera
2011	Giacomo Puccini	Madama Butterfly	Sharpless	Folkoperan
1997	Gioachino Rossini	Il Viaggio à Reims	Don Alvaro	Gothenburg opera house
2018	Albert Schnelzer	Att dö på sin post	Rånaren	
1994	Johann Strauss II	Die Fledermaus	Falke	Gothenburg Opera
2001	Richard Strauss	Capriccio	Der Graf	Royal Danish Theatre
1999	Richard Strauss	Ariadne auf Naxos	Harlequin	Minnesota Orchestra
2006	Richard Strauss	Arabella	Mandryka	Gothenburg opera house
1996	Peter Tchaikovsky	Eugene Onegin	Onegin	Spoleto Festival
2004	Viktor Ullmann	Der Kaiser von Atlantis	Kaiser Overall	Oper Frankfurt
2003	Giuseppe Verdi	La Traviata	Giorgio Germont	Oper Frankfurt
2008	Giuseppe Verdi	Falstaff	Ford	Royal Swedish Opera
2008	Giuseppe Verdi	Don Carlos	Rodrigo	Oper Frankfurt
2015	Giuseppe Verdi	Rigoletto	Rigoletto	Opera Zuid
2014	Richard Wagner	Lohengrin	Der Heerufer	Teatro Real
2012	Richard Wagner	Parsifal	Amfortas	Malmö Opera
2005	Richard Wagner	Das Rheingold	Donner	
2013	Richard Wagner	Das Rheingold	Wotan	Dalhalla
2011	Richard Wagner	Die Götterdämmerung	Gunther	
2022	Lars Johan Werle	Tintomara	Baron Reuterholm	

== Sources ==
- "Anders Larsson baryton med Europa som arbetsfält". Operalogg (in Swedish). 22 February 2021.
