= Barefoot Songs =

Song cycle by Allan Pettersson

Barfotasånger
- Song cycle by Allan Pettersson
- English: Barefoot Songs
- Text: own poems
- Language: Swedish
- Composed: 1943–1945: Stockholm
- Published: 1976, 1978
- Publisher: Rabén & Sjögren (text), Nordiska Musikförlaget
- Duration: 60 min
- Movements: 24
- Scoring: voice; piano

Barefoot Songs (Swedish: Barfotasånger) is a large song cycle for voice and piano by Allan Pettersson.

== Background ==
The 24 songs in Swedish were composed between 1943 and 1945. At this time, Pettersson was violist at the Stockholm Concert Society. The text of the songs was written by Pettersson himself and is partly autobiographical. The main topic of the song cycle is his youth in poverty. The diatonic songs were kept simple, but the text is not easy to understand and uses a highly poetic and cryptic language. Pettersson wrote over 100 poems, but only 24 were set to music. The Swedish Broadcasting Corporation and his publisher Nordiska Musikförlaget initially refused to publish the songs. The cycle was first published in 1976. Musicologist Andreas Krause has posited that the name Barefoot Songs is a reminiscence and tribute to Schubert's Winterreise. "Barefoot on the ice" is a quotation from the 24th and last song Der Leiermann. Some songs are reminiscent of ballads or romances, folk songs or hymns and Schubert's Winterreise.

== Synopsis ==
1. Visa i sorgton (Song of Lament)
2. Klokar och knythänder (Wise Men and Clenched Hands)
3. Fattig är mor (Mother is poor)
4. Kärleken går vilse (Love errs)
5. Stjärnan och gallret (The Star and the Bars)
6. Nånting man mist (Something got lost)
7. Blomma säj! (Flower, Tell Me)
8. Vintervisa (Winter Song)
9. Liten ska vänta (The little one must wait)
10. Jungfrun och Ljugarpust (The Maiden and the Lying Wind)
11. En spelekarls himlafärd (Death of a Fiddler)
12. Du vet (You know)
13. Du lögnar (Telling Lies)
14. Herren går på ängen (The Lord Walks in the Meadow)
15. Hundarna vid havet (The Dogs on the Sea)
16. Kivlynnte liten (Little Squabbler)
17. Jag tänker på ting (I think of things)
18. Blomma vid min fot (Flower at my Foot)
19. Rymmaren (The one that got away)
20. Min längtan (My Yearning)
21. Nu väntar man vinter (Now one awaits the winter)
22. Vännen i Söndagslandet (The Friend in Sunday Land)
23. Mens flugorna surra (While the Flies are Buzzing)
24. Han ska släcka min lykta (He Will Extinguish My Light)

== Quotations ==
Pettersson quoted songs from his 24 Barefoot Songs in several of his larger scale compositions. His 6th Symphony cites the song Han ska släcka min lykta (He Will Extinguish My Light), the 14th Symphony cites Klokar och knythänder (Wise Men and Clenched Hands) and Violin Concerto No. 2 cites Herren går på ängen (The Lord Walks in the Meadow).

== Arrangements ==
=== Orchestration ===
In 1968–1969, conductor and composer Antal Doráti arranged eight of Pettersson's Barefoot Songs as full-scale orchestral songs.

1. Herren går på ängen (The Lord Walks in the Meadow)
2. Klokar och knythänder (Wise Men and Clenched Hands)
3. Blomma säj! (Flower, Tell Me)
4. Jungfrun och Ljugarpust (The Maiden and the Lying Wind)
5. Mens flugorna surra (While the Flies are Buzzing)
6. Du lögnar (Telling Lies)
7. Min längtan (My Yearning)
8. En spelekarls himlafärd (Death of a Fiddler)

=== Suite ===
In 1969, conductor and composer Eskil Hemberg arranged six songs for mixed choir.

1. Herren går på ängen (The Lord Walks in the Meadow)
2. Vännen i Söndagslandet (The Friend in Sunday Land)
3. Blomma säj! (Flower, Tell Me)
4. Nu väntar man vinter (Now one awaits the winter)
5. En spelekarls himlafärd (Death of a Fiddler)
6. Du lögnar (Telling Lies)

== Selected recordings ==
- Anders Larsson (baritone), Christian Lindberg, Nordic Chamber Orchestra. 8 Barefoot Songs (orchestrated Antal Doráti); BIS BIS1690 SACD
- Peter Mattei (baritone), Bengt-Åke Lundin (piano); BIS BIS2584 SACD
- Margot Rödin (mezzo-soprano), Erik Saedén (baritone), Arnold Östman (piano) (Swedish Society Discofil LP 1974 and CD 1988) OCLC 7385656, 20635303
- Monica Groop (mezzo-soprano), Cord Garben (piano) (CPO CD 1998) OCLC 40262316
- Erik Saedén (baritone), Antal Doráti, Stockholm Philharmonic Orchestra. 8 Barefoot Songs (orchestrated Antal Doráti) (Lyssna 2LP 1974, HNH 2LP 1977) OCLC 610262981
- Suite from Barefoot Songs, Margareta Dahlström (soprano), Eskil Hemberg, Stockholm University Chorus (Caprice CD 1988) OCLC 990345554
