= Allan Pettersson =

Swedish composer and violist (1911–1980)

- Born: Gustaf Allan Pettersson; 19 September 1911; Västra Ryd, Uppland, Sweden
- Died: 20 June 1980 (aged 68); Stockholm, Sweden
- Resting place: Högalid Church
- Occupations: Composer; violist
- Notable work: Barefoot Songs; Symphony No. 9

Gustaf Allan Pettersson (19 September 1911 – 20 June 1980) was a Swedish composer and violist. He is considered one of the 20th century's most important Swedish composers and was described as one of the last great symphonists, often compared to Gustav Mahler. Pettersson's music has a very distinctive sound and can hardly be confused with that of any other 20th-century composer. In the final decade of his life, his symphonies (typically one-movement works) developed an international following, particularly in Germany and Sweden. Of these, his best known work is Symphony No. 7. His music later found success in the United States. The conductors Antal Doráti and Sergiu Comissiona premiered and recorded several of his symphonies. Pettersson's song cycle Barefoot Songs influenced many of his compositions. Doráti arranged eight of the Barefoot Songs. Birgit Cullberg produced three ballets based on Pettersson's music.

Pettersson studied at the conservatory of the Royal Swedish Academy of Music. For more than a decade, he was a violist in the Stockholm Concert Society; after retiring he devoted himself exclusively to composition. Later in his life, he suffered from rheumatoid arthritis. Pettersson was awarded the Swedish royal medal Litteris et Artibus.

== Biography ==
=== Early life ===
Born on 19 September 1911, Gustaf Allan Pettersson was the youngest of four children. His father, Karl Viktor Pettersson (1875–1952), was a violent, alcoholic blacksmith, and his mother, Ida Paulina (née Svenson) (1876–1960), was a dressmaker. Pettersson was born at Granhammar manor in Västra Ryd parish in the Uppland province of Sweden. He grew up poor in Stockholm's Södermalm district, where he lived throughout his life. He once said:

I wasn't born under a piano, I didn't spend my childhood with my father, the composer... no, I learnt how to work white-hot iron with the smith's hammer. My father was a smith who may have said no to God, but not to alcohol. My mother was a pious woman who sang and played with her four children.

With his parents and siblings, Pettersson lived in a damp, one-room basement apartment with bars on the window. When he was 10, he bought a cheap violin with money he earned from selling Christmas cards and taught himself to play it. Even the beatings he received from his father and the threat of reform school could not diminish his interest in music. Through strict self-discipline and with the help of music, Pettersson freed himself from his social misery and difficult family circumstances. Aged 14, he finished elementary school and took up full-time practice on the violin. He later made two unsuccessful attempts to enter the conservatory of the Royal Swedish Academy of Music.

In 1930, Pettersson began studying violin and later the viola, as well as counterpoint and harmony, at the conservatory of the Royal Swedish Academy of Music (Royal College of Music, Stockholm). At the beginning of World War II, he was in Paris, studying the viola with the French violist Maurice Vieux. Pettersson won the Jenny Lind scholarship prize in 1938, using it to study abroad.

=== Later life ===
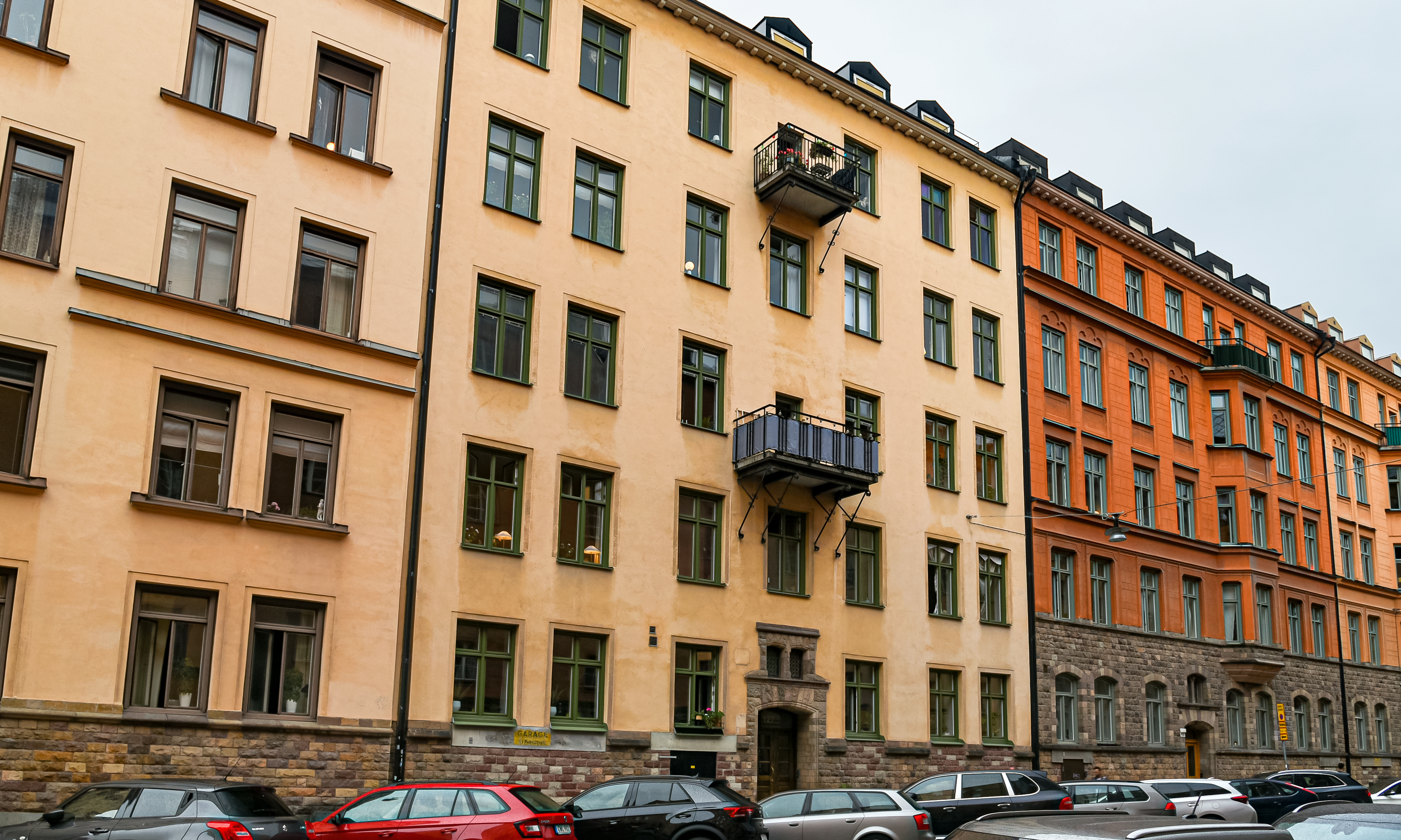
Pettersson's home at Åsögatan 127, Stockholm

During the 1940s, Pettersson worked as a violist in the Stockholm Concert Society (later the Royal Stockholm Philharmonic Orchestra). He also studied composition with the composer and conductor Karl-Birger Blomdahl, orchestration with the conductor Tor Mann, and counterpoint with organist and composer Otto Olsson. In 1943, he married a physiotherapist, Gudrun Tyra Charlotta Gustafsson (1921–2017).

In September 1951, Pettersson went to Paris to study composition and was a student of composers René Leibowitz, Arthur Honegger, Olivier Messiaen, and Darius Milhaud. He returned to Sweden at the end of 1952. In the early 1950s, he was diagnosed with rheumatoid arthritis. (Note: Other sources say 1963.) He gave up playing the viola and began devoting his life to composition. In 1954, he received his first annual state composition grant.

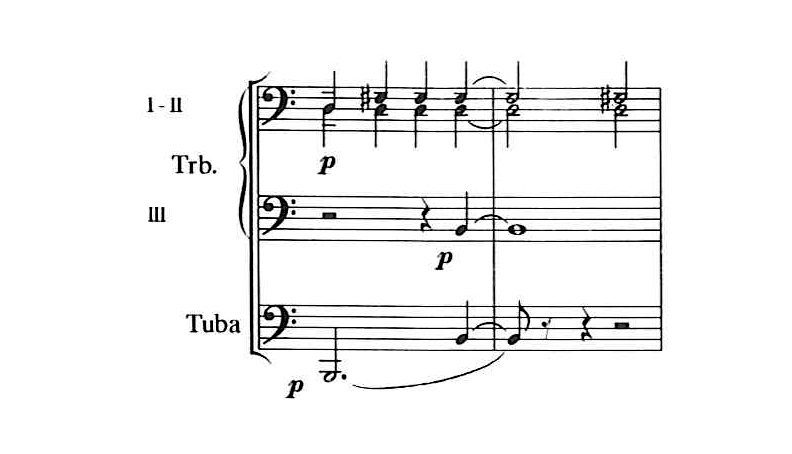
Motif Symphony No. 7

By the time of his Symphony No. 5, completed in 1962, his mobility and health were considerably compromised. In 1964, the government granted him a lifelong guaranteed income. His greatest success came a few years later with his Symphony No. 7 (1966), which premiered on 13 October 1968 in Stockholm Concert Hall with Antal Doráti conducting the Royal Stockholm Philharmonic Orchestra. A recording of his seventh symphony, with the same conductor and orchestra, was released in 1969. It was a breakthrough, establishing his international reputation, and he received two Swedish Grammis in 1970. The symphony was listed in 2025 in the Swedish Culture Canon. The conductors Antal Doráti and Sergiu Comissiona premiered and made first recordings of several of Pettersson's symphonies and contributed to his rise to fame during the 1970s.

Pettersson was hospitalized for nine months in 1970, soon after the composition of his Symphony No. 9, his longest symphony. He began writing the condensed Symphony No. 10 (1972) from his sickbed. Pettersson was admitted to Karolinska Hospital due to a life-threatening kidney ailment. He recovered, but rheumatoid arthritis largely confined him to his fourth-floor apartment in a building with no elevator. (Note: Pettersson and his wife lived for 30 years in this apartment.) In 1975, after a dispute about a change in a concert program for an American tour, the Stockholm Philharmonic was forbidden to perform works by Pettersson "for all time". The ban was lifted in 1976. Pettersson was awarded the Litteris et Artibus, a Swedish royal medal established in 1853, in 1977. In autumn 1978, (Note: Other sources state 1976.) he moved to state-provided housing. He began writing his seventeenth symphony, but died of cancer on 20 June 1980, at age 68, in Stockholm's Maria Magdalena parish before finishing it. He is buried in the Högalid Church columbarium.

== Music ==
Pettersson's music can be compared to Mahler's symphonic output, especially in the magnificent design and the passion and dynamism. Like Mahler, he also often includes music from his songs in his symphonies, as well as the second violin concerto. Pettersson, an eccentric symphonist, was not an avant-gardist. His kinetic and organic development of musical matter uses traditional means of expression. Basic motifs are constantly being changed and developed. Pettersson's writing is very demanding, often featuring many simultaneous polyphonic lines. His symphonies end on common major or minor chords—tonality, though often attenuated, is found mostly in slower sections. This is evident in the openings and endings of his 6th and 7th symphonies, and the end of his 9th. Overwhelmingly serious in tone, often dissonant, his music rises to ferocious climaxes, relieved, especially in his later works, by lyrical oases ("lyrische Inseln").

Pettersson's music has a very distinctive sound and can hardly be confused with that of any other 20th-century composer. His symphonies, which range from 25 to 70 minutes long, are typically one-movement works, with the exceptions of No. 3 (in four movements) and No. 8 (in two). Pettersson's music is often demanding both on performers and listeners.

Pettersson quoted songs from his own 24 Barefoot Songs in several of his compositions.

Musicologist Ivanka Stoïanova designed a theory of musical space about Pettersson's music.

Most of his music has now been recorded at least once and much of it is now available in published scores. (Note: Pettersson's works have been published by Nordiska Musikförlaget.)

=== Works ===
Pettersson began composing songs and smaller chamber works in the 1930s.

His production from the 1940s includes the song cycle 24 Barefoot Songs (1943–1945) based on his poems and a dissonant concerto for violin and string quartet (1949), which is influenced by Béla Bartók and Paul Hindemith. Pettersson soon found his own compositional style. In 1951, he created the experimental Seven Sonatas for two violins. At the same time, he composed the first of his 17 symphonies, which he left unfinished. This work has been recorded in a performing version prepared by trombonist and conductor Christian Lindberg in 2011.

Pettersson about the symphonic output of the 1950s:

No one in the 1950s noticed, that I am always breaking up the structures, that I was creating a whole new symphonic form.

It took four years to write the conceptual and style-defining Symphony No. 6 (1963–1966). His Symphony No. 7 and Symphony No. 8 (1968–1969) have been recorded more than his other works and are probably his best-known. In the 1970s, he composed two related works about social protest and compassion, the Symphony No. 12 for mixed chorus and orchestra (1973–1974) to poems by Nobel laureate in Literature Pablo Neruda with contemporary relevance (Note: Pettersson chose poems, in Swedish translations, from the poetic cycle Canto General.) and the cantata Vox Humana (1974) on texts by Latin American poets. During the prolific last decade of his life, he also wrote a concerto for violin and orchestra (1977–1978, rev. 1980) written for the violinist Ida Haendel, a Symphony No. 16 (1979) which features a bravura solo part for alto saxophone commissioned by American saxophonist Frederick L. Hemke, and an incomplete, posthumously discovered concerto for viola and orchestra (1979–1980).

== Legacy ==
In 1968–1969, conductor and composer Antal Doráti arranged eight of Pettersson's Barefoot Songs as full-scale orchestral songs.

Choreographer Birgit Cullberg produced three ballets based on Pettersson's music. Rapport (1976, Symphony No. 7), Vid Urskogens rand (1977, Concerto No. 1 for String Orchestra), Krigsdanser (War Dance) (1979, Symphony No. 9).

The four orchestral sketches "... das Gesegnete, das Verfluchte" (1991) by Peter Ruzicka are a tribute to Pettersson's life and work, quoting sketches of his unfinished Symphony No. 17.

Roy Andersson used the finale of Symphony No. 7 in his short film World of Glory (Härlig är jorden).

After Pettersson's death, the Internationale Allan Pettersson Gesellschaft (International Allan Pettersson Society) issued six yearbooks, Classic Produktion Osnabrück (CPO) began recording his complete works, and a series of concerts (in 1994–1995) programmed almost all of them.

In 2002, a Swedish Allan Pettersson Society (Allan Pettersson-sällskapet) was founded.

== Awards ==
- 1970 Member of the Royal Swedish Academy of Music (Kungliga Musikaliska Akademien), No. 741
- 1977 Litteris et Artibus
- 1979 Professors namn (Honorary Professorship of the Royal Swedish Academy of Music)

== Discography ==
The selected discography lists recordings in their original format and release label. Some of the LP releases have been reissued on CD. A 12-CD pack of the complete symphonies of Allan Pettersson has been produced by CPO (Classic Produktion Osnabrück) based on recordings of 1984, 1988, 1991–1995, 2004. In 2023, a cycle of all Pettersson symphonies produced by BIS Records was completed.

=== Symphonies ===
- Symphony No. 1 (1951) (incomplete)
  - Norrköping Symphony Orchestra, Christian Lindberg (performing version by Christian Lindberg) (BIS CD) OCLC 749880192
- Symphony No. 2 (1952–1953)
  - Swedish Radio Symphony Orchestra, Stig Westerberg (Swedish Society Discofil LP and CD) OCLC 869139542
  - BBC Scottish Symphony Orchestra, Alun Francis (CPO CD) OCLC 990776807, 610619988
  - Norrköping Symphony Orchestra, Christian Lindberg (BIS CD) OCLC 749880192
- Symphony No. 3 (1954–1955)
  - Rundfunk-Sinfonieorchester Saarbrücken, Alun Francis (CPO CD) OCLC 874528446
  - Norrköping Symphony Orchestra, Leif Segerstam (BIS CD) OCLC 987698874, 70480579, 875607794
  - Norrköping Symphony Orchestra, Christian Lindberg (BIS CD)
- Symphony No. 4 (1958–1959)
  - Göteborgs Symfoniker, Sergiu Comissiona (BIS LP)
  - Rundfunk-Sinfonieorchester Saarbrücken, Alun Francis (CPO CD) OCLC 874528446
  - Norrköping Symphony Orchestra, Christian Lindberg (BIS CD) OCLC 908174896
- Symphony No. 5 (1960–1962)
  - Berliner Sibelius Orchester, Andreas Peer Kähler (Bluebell LP and CD) OCLC 18877225
  - Malmö Symphony Orchestra, Moshe Atzmon (BIS CD) OCLC 873743666
  - Rundfunk-Sinfonieorchester Saarbrücken, Alun Francis (CPO CD) OCLC 990243222, 1057997291
  - Norrköping Symphony Orchestra, Christian Lindberg (BIS CD) OCLC 1034638954
- Symphony No. 6 (1963–1966)
  - Norrköping Symphony Orchestra, Okko Kamu (CBS LP) OCLC 725553097
  - Deutsches Symphonie-Orchester Berlin, Manfred Trojahn (CPO CD) OCLC 871953334
  - Norrköping Symphony Orchestra, Christian Lindberg (BIS CD) OCLC 945977705, 870662801
- Symphony No. 7 (1966–1967)
  - Stockholm Philharmonic Orchestra, Antal Doráti (Swedish Society Discofil LP and CD/London LP) (Grammis 1970) OCLC 872147110, 14964319, 45586363
  - Swedish Radio Symphony Orchestra, Sergiu Comissiona (Caprice CD) OCLC 29620951, 977971527
  - Philharmonisches Staatsorchester Hamburg, Gerd Albrecht (CPO CD) OCLC 60853163, 822857094
  - Norrköping Symphony Orchestra, Leif Segerstam (BIS CD) OCLC 874923816
  - Norrköping Symphony Orchestra, Christian Lindberg (BIS CD) OCLC 1034638954
- Symphony No. 8 (1968–1969)
  - Baltimore Symphony Orchestra, Sergiu Comissiona (Polar LP and Deutsche Grammophon LP) OCLC 725716693
  - Radio-Symphonie-Orchester Berlin, Thomas Sanderling (CPO CD) OCLC 638464541, 873571490
  - Philharmonisches Staatsorchester Hamburg, Gerd Albrecht (Orfeo CD) OCLC 249081425
  - Norrköping Symphony Orchestra, Leif Segerstam (BIS CD) OCLC 41557470, 317634279
  - Norrköping Symphony Orchestra, Christian Lindberg (BIS CD)
- Symphony No. 9 (1970)
  - Göteborgs Symfoniker, Sergiu Comissiona (Philips LP)
  - Deutsches Symphonie-Orchester Berlin, Alun Francis (CPO CD) OCLC 1058033816, 873438119
  - Norrköping Symphony Orchestra, Christian Lindberg (BIS CD) (Grammis 2015) OCLC 995556946
- Symphony No. 10 (1971–1972)
  - Swedish Radio Symphony Orchestra, Antal Doráti (EMI LP) OCLC 913186819
  - NDR Radiophilharmonie Hannover, Alun Francis (CPO CD) OCLC 890524210, 871969453
  - Norrköping Symphony Orchestra, Leif Segerstam (BIS CD) OCLC 41557470, 317634279
- Symphony No. 11 (1971–1973)
  - Norrköping Symphony Orchestra, Leif Segerstam (BIS CD) OCLC 874492404
  - NDR Radiophilharmonie Hannover, Alun Francis (CPO CD) OCLC 890524210
- Symphony No. 12 "De döda på torget" ("The Dead of the Square") (1973–1974)
  - Stockholm Philharmonic Orchestra, Stockholm Philharmonic Chorus, Uppsala University Chamber Choir, Carl Rune Larsson (Caprice LP and CD) OCLC 20358824
  - Swedish Radio Symphony Orchestra, Swedish Radio Choir, Eric Ericson Choir, Manfred Honeck (CPO CD) OCLC 873175780, 638445016, 70702259
  - Swedish Radio Choir, Eric Ericson Chamber Choir, Norrköping Symphony Orchestra, Christian Lindberg (BIS CD) OCLC 1231565131
- Symphony No. 13 (1976)
  - BBC Scottish Symphony Orchestra, Alun Francis (CPO CD) OCLC 990787167
  - Norrköping Symphony Orchestra, Christian Lindberg (BIS CD) OCLC 933602262, 928103709
- Symphony No. 14 (1978)
  - Stockholm Philharmonic Orchestra, Sergiu Comissiona (Phono Suecia CD) OCLC 874190019, 658765036
  - Radio-Symphonie-Orchester Berlin, Johan M. Arnell (CPO CD) OCLC 822857099
  - Norrköping Symphony Orchestra, Christian Lindberg (BIS CD) OCLC 973569405
- Symphony No. 15 (1978)
  - Deutsches Symphonie-Orchester Berlin, Peter Ruzicka (CPO CD) OCLC 33168154
  - Norrköping Symphony Orchestra, Leif Segerstam (BIS CD) OCLC 987698874, 70480579
- Symphony No. 16 (1979)
  - Frederick L. Hemke (Alto saxophone), Stockholm Philharmonic Orchestra, Yuri Ahronovitch (Swedish Society Discofil LP and CD) OCLC 45586363
  - John-Edward Kelly (Alto saxophone), Rundfunk-Sinfonieorchester Saarbrücken, Alun Francis (CPO CD) OCLC 1057997291
  - Jörgen Pettersson (Alto saxophone), Norrköping Symphony Orchestra, Christian Lindberg (BIS CD) OCLC 908174896
- Symphony No. 17 (1980) (fragment)
  - Norrköping Symphony Orchestra, Christian Lindberg (BIS SACD-2290, 2019) OCLC 1104057068

=== Other works ===
- Two Elegies (1934)
  - Martin Gelland (violin), Lennart Wallin (piano) (BIS CD) OCLC 872174277
- 6 Songs (1935) (text by Gunnar Björling et al.).
  - Margot Rödin (mezzo-soprano), Arnold Östman (piano) (Swedish Society Discofil LP and CD) OCLC 20635303
- Andante espressivo (1938)
  - Martin Gelland (violin), Lennart Wallin (piano) (BIS CD) OCLC 872174277
- Romanza (1942)
  - Martin Gelland (violin), Lennart Wallin (piano) (BIS CD) OCLC 872174277
- 24 Barefoot Songs (Barfotasånger) (1943–1945)
  - Erik Saedén (baritone), Arnold Östman (piano) (Swedish Society Discofil LP and CD) OCLC 7385656
- 8 Barefoot Songs (Barfotasånger) orchestrated by Antal Doráti
  - Anders Larsson (baritone), Nordic Chamber Orchestra, Christian Lindberg (BIS CD)
- Lamento for piano (1945)
  - Volker Banfield (CPO CD) OCLC 1011487634
  - Lennart Wallin (BIS CD) OCLC 872174277
- Concerto No. 1 for violin and string quartet (1949)
  - Ulf Hoelscher (violin), Mandelring-Quartett (CPO CD) OCLC 725519583
- Concerto No. 1 for string orchestra (1949–1950)
  - Musica Vitae, Petter Sundkvist (Caprice CD) OCLC 80593693
  - Nordic Chamber Orchestra, Christian Lindberg (BIS CD)
  - Deutsche Kammerakademie Neuss, Johannes Goritzki (CPO CD) OCLC 638280739, 32319319
- Seven Sonatas for two violins (1951)
  - Duo Gelland (BIS CD) OCLC 872174277, 45496385
- Concerto No. 2 for string Orchestra (1956)
  - Musica Vitae, Petter Sundkvist (Caprice CD) OCLC 80593693, 32319319
  - Nordic Chamber Orchestra, Christian Lindberg (BIS CD)
  - Deutsche Kammerakademie Neuss, Johannes Goritzki (CPO CD) OCLC 638280739
- Concerto No. 3 for string Orchestra (1956–1957)
  - Nordic Chamber Orchestra, Christian Lindberg (BIS CD) OCLC 871378168
  - Deutsche Kammerakademie Neuss, Johannes Goritzki (CPO CD) OCLC 638280739, 32319319
- Symphonic Movement (1973) (commissioned by Swedish Radio TV1 channel for a film essay by Boris Engström)
  - BBC Scottish Symphony Orchestra, Alun Francis (CPO CD) OCLC 610619988
- Vox Humana (1974)
  - Marianne Mellnas (soprano), Margot Rodin (alto), Sven-Erik Alexandersson (tenor), Swedish Radio Symphony Orchestra, Swedish Radio Chorus, Stig Westerberg (BIS CD) OCLC 778517932
- Concerto No. 2 for violin and orchestra (1977–1978)
  - Ida Haendel (violin), Swedish Radio Symphony Orchestra, Herbert Blomstedt (Caprice LP and CD) OCLC 20635424
  - Isabelle van Keulen (violin), Swedish Radio Symphony Orchestra, Thomas Dausgaard (CPO CD) OCLC 873599887
  - Ulf Wallin (violin), Norrköping Symphony Orchestra, Christian Lindberg (BIS SACD-2290, 2019) OCLC 1104057068
- Concerto for viola and orchestra (1979–1980)
  - Nobuko Imai (viola), Malmö Symphony Orchestra, Lev Markiz (BIS CD) OCLC 873743666

== Writings ==
- Pettersson, Allan (1952). "Dissonance—douleur". Musique Contemporaine—Revue Internationale (in French). 4–6. Paris: 235–236. OCLC 702671430.
- —— (1988) [1952]. "Dissonance—douleur = Dissonanz—Schmerz". In Im Auftrag der Internationalen Allan-Pettersson-Gesellschaft von Michael Kube (ed.). Allan Pettersson Jahrbuch. 1988 (in French and German). Saarbrücken: Pfau Verlag. pp. 7–13. ISBN 978-3-89727-194-4.
- —— (1955). "Den konstnärliga lögnen". Musiklivet (in Swedish). 28 (2). Stockholm: Sveriges körförbund: 26–27. ISSN 0027-4836.
- —— (1968). "Identification med det oanseliga [Letter to Leif Aare]". Nutida Musik (in Swedish). 12 (2). Stockholm: International Society for Contemporary Music, Svenska sektionen: 55–56. ISSN 1652-6082.
- ——; et al. (1989b). "Allan Petterssons Boykott der Stockholmer Philharmoniker 1975". In Im Auftrag der Internationalen Allan-Pettersson-Gesellschaft von Michael Kube (ed.). Allan Pettersson Jahrbuch. 1989 (in German). Saarbrücken: Pfau Verlag. pp. 10–44. ISBN 978-3-89727-195-1.
- —— (1989a). "Randnotizen zur 10. Symphonie [Karolinska Hospital Diary 1970–1971]". In Im Auftrag der Internationalen Allan-Pettersson-Gesellschaft von Michael Kube (ed.). Allan Pettersson Jahrbuch. 1989 (in German). Saarbrücken: Pfau Verlag. pp. 45–48. ISBN 978-3-89727-195-1.
