= Sergiu Comissiona =

Romanian-Israeli-American conductor and violinist (1928–2005)

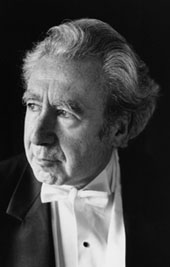
Sergiu Comissiona

Sergiu Comissiona (Hebrew: סרג'ו קומיסיונה; June 16, 1928 – March 5, 2005) was a Romanian-Israeli-American conductor and violinist.

== Biography ==
=== Early life ===
Born in Bucharest, Romania, into a Jewish family, he began violin studies at the age of five. He was hired as a violinist by the Romanian State Ensemble while still in his teens, making his conducting debut at the age of 17. In his twenties, he was named principal conductor of the Romanian National Opera, which he led from 1955 to 1959.

=== Career ===
He fled the Communist regime in 1959 and emigrated to Israel. In 1960, he founded the Ramat Gan Chamber Orchestra, which he led until 1967. He also directed the Haifa Symphony Orchestra from 1959 until 1966. He made his American debut with the Philadelphia Orchestra in 1965 and emigrated to the United States in 1968. Later, he was also music director of the Gothenburg Symphony Orchestra, Sweden, from 1966 to 1977, and became chief conductor of the Netherlands Radio Philharmonic in Hilversum, Netherlands, in 1982. Comissiona also held music directorships with some of North America's leading ensembles, including the Baltimore Symphony Orchestra, the Houston Symphony, the Vancouver Symphony Orchestra and was also music director of the New York City Opera. Beginning in 1969, he spent 15 years with the Baltimore Orchestra and transformed it from a little-known ensemble into a nationally respected orchestra, eventually taking it on its first international tour and directing it in its first recordings. He was also the music director of the Asian Youth Orchestra. Comissiona was principal conductor of the Spanish national broadcasting network orchestra in Madrid, the RTVE Symphony Orchestra, from 1990 to 1998.

From 1997 until his death, Comissiona served as the conductor of the University of Southern California Thornton School of Music Symphony

=== World premiere and other notable performances ===
He premiered and made the first recordings of a number of modern works including symphonies by Allan Pettersson, who dedicated his Symphony No. 9 to him, as well as works by Michael Jeffrey Shapiro and Elie Siegmeister. Comissiona conducted Siegmeister's An Entertainment for Violin, Piano, and Orchestra at the Merriwether Post Pavilion on July 2, 1976, with Ann Saslav, piano, and Isidor Saslav, the BSO's concertmaster, as soloists. The Saslavs had commissioned the work from Siegmeister.

In 1968, Comissiona conducted the first performance of Rued Langgaard's Music of the Spheres in 46 years (since 1922), which ignited a renaissance for Langgaard's music.

=== Personal life ===
Comissiona and his wife became American citizens on July 4, 1976, at a special Bicentennial ceremony at Fort McHenry on Baltimore Harbor. He was a longtime resident of New York City. Comissiona died of a heart attack in Oklahoma City, Oklahoma just hours before he was to perform.

== Honours and awards ==
Comissiona was made a Knight of l'Ordre des Arts et des Lettres of France; received a Mus D. honoris causa from the New England Conservatory in Boston, Massachusetts; was an honorary member of the Royal Swedish Academy of Music and founder national competition for young American conductors of the Baltimore Symphony Orchestra.

Cultural offices
Preceded by Okko Kamu	Principal Conductor, Helsinki Philharmonic Orchestra; 1990–1994	Succeeded by Leif Segerstam
Preceded by Arpad Joó	Director, RTVE Symphony Orchestra; 1990–1998	Succeeded by Enrique García Asensio
