= Berlin Opera =

Berlin Opera may refer to:

- Staatsoper Unter den Linden (State Opera Unter den Linden), opened in 1742 as Königliche Hofoper (Royal Court Opera)
- Deutsche Oper Berlin (German Opera Berlin), opened in 1912 as Deutsches Opernhaus (German Opera House)
- Komische Oper Berlin (Comical Opera Berlin), opened in 1892 as Theater Unter den Linden
- Berlin Opera Academy (Comical Opera Berlin), opened in 2015 in collaboration with Opernfest
- Berlin Opera House (Kitchener, Ontario), theatre in Canada active from 1896-1924
