= Julius Bechgaard =

Danish composer (1843–1917)

Bechgaard
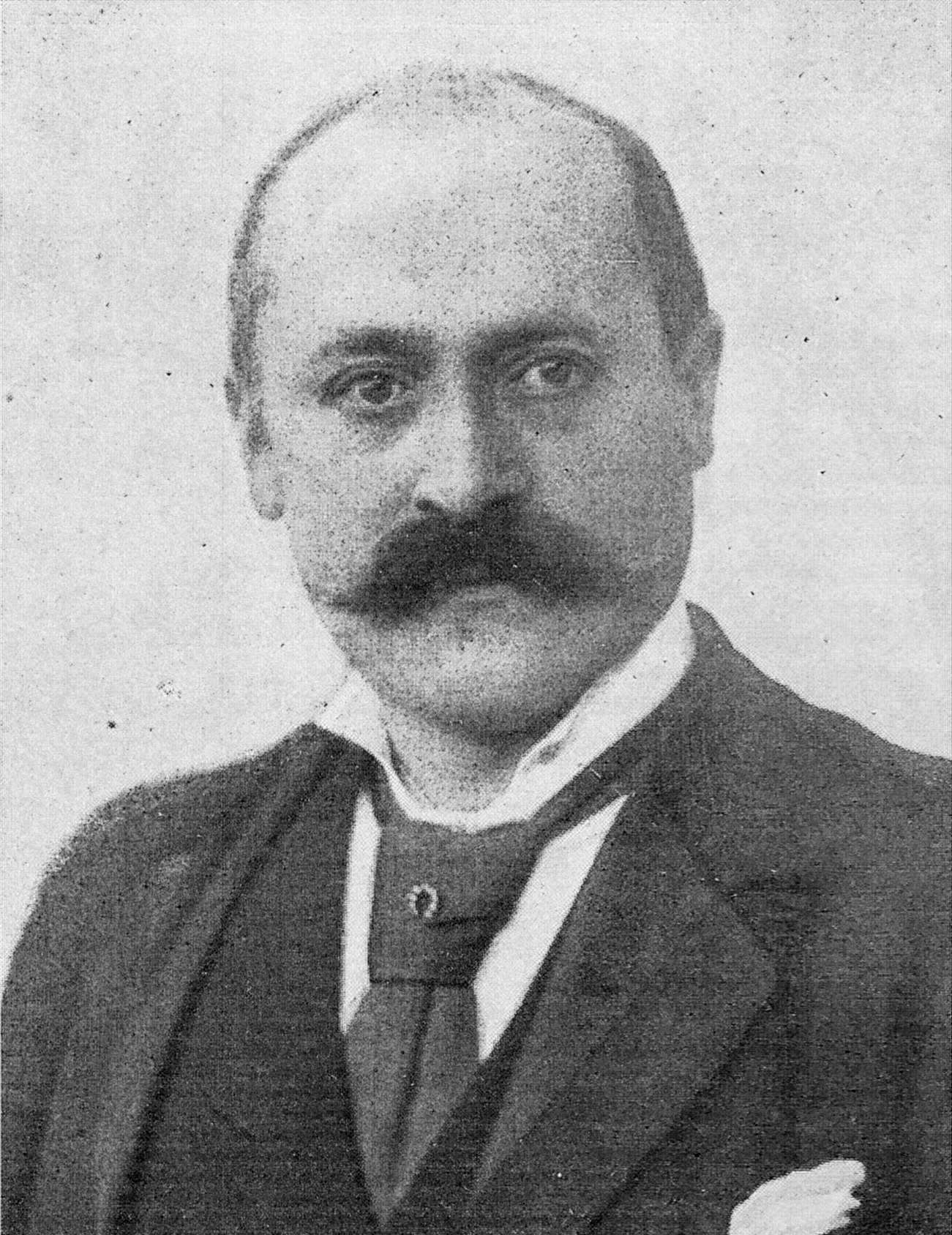
- Julius Bechgaard.
- Born: 19 December 1843; Copenhagen
- Died: 4 March 1917 (aged 73); Frederiksberg
- Occupation: Danish composer

Julius Andreas Bechgaard (19 December 1843 [different 22 December] – 4 March 1917) was a Danish composer of piano pieces, songs, and operas.

Bechgaard was born in Copenhagen. His best known opera, Frode, shows the influence of Wagner. He died aged 73 in Frederiksberg.

== Works ==
- op. 60: Troldbunden (Song with lyrics by A. Wallén, manuscript)
- Velsign vort Hjem (Song for Men's Choir with lyrics by Vilhelm Gregersen, manuscript)
- Sømandsliv (Sailor's Farewell, song cycle)
- Gud signe dig (God Bless You song)
- Seks firstemmige sange (Six Four-Part Songs)
  - Til Solen (To the Sun)
  - Aftensuk (Evening Sigh)
  - Hvile (Rest)
  - Morgenstemning (Morning Mood)
  - Elverdansen (Elfin Dance)
  - Blomsterne tale (Like a Child)
- Strandby Folk (musical play in 4 acts by Holger Drachmann with music by Bechgaard, 1883)
- Frode (opera, premiered 11 May 1893 in Copenhagen)
- Frau Inge (opera, premiered 1894, in Prague)
- Kender du Danmark (songs, with lyrics by Oscar Madsen, 1866–1902)
