= Jaakko Mäntyjärvi =

Finnish composer and translator

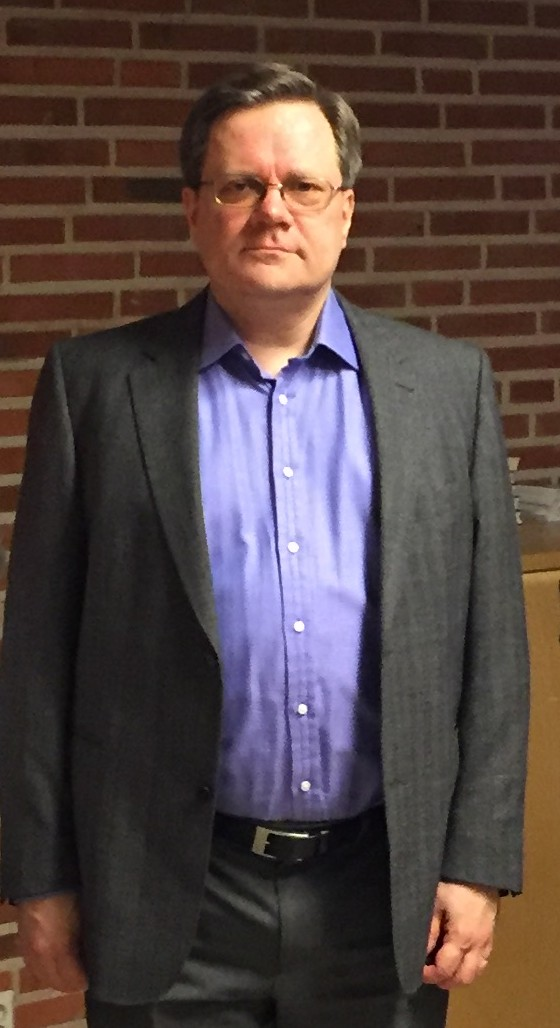
Jaakko Mäntyjärvi in 2016

Jaakko Mäntyjärvi (Finnish pronunciation: [ˈjɑːkːo ˈmæntyˌjærʋi]) is a Finnish composer of classical music, and a professional translator.

== Early life ==
Mäntyjärvi was born in Turku. He studied musicology, English language and literature and linguistics at the University of Helsinki, graduating with the equivalent of an MA degree in 1991. In 1987, he was accredited as an Authorized Translator from Finnish to English and English to Finnish. He also studied theory of music and choir conducting at the Sibelius Academy.

== Professional life ==
Mäntyjärvi is a professional freelance translator and composer, and also an amateur and semi-professional choral singer and conductor. He is one of Finland’s internationally best known composers of choral music, with a catalog of some 150 works published to date. He has given talks on his works at various choral events in Europe, the USA and Australia, and has occasionally given a course on the history of choral music at the Sibelius Academy.

== Compositions ==
As a composer, Jaakko Mäntyjärvi describes himself as an eclectic traditionalist: adopting influences from a number of styles and periods, and basing his musical idiom largely on traditionally oriented materials. Because he is himself active in making music, his music is very practically oriented; most of his works are for choir.

His major choral works include Four Shakespeare Songs (1984), Dagen svalnar... (Day is cooling; 1991/93), Pseudo-Yoik (1994), El Hambo (1997), the 40-part motet Tentatio (2006), Stuttgarter Psalmen (2009) and the Trinity Service (2019). His work Canticum Calamitatis Maritimae received third prize in the European composition competition for cathedral choirs in 1997. His major commissions include works for the Cork International Choral Festival (1999), the 700th anniversary of the consecration of Turku Cathedral (2000), Chanticleer (2001, 2016), the King’s Singers (2002) and the World Symposium on Choral Music (2008, 2017). He was composer-in-residence of the Tapiola Chamber Choir from 2000 to 2005.
