= Waldemarsskatten =

Waldemarsskatten (Waldemar's Treasure) is a romantic opera in 4 acts by Andreas Hallén to a libretto by Axel von Klinkowström. Composed in 1898, it was first performed 8 April 1899 at the Royal Swedish Opera, under conductor Conrad Nordqvist. The libretto is based on the medieval Danish king Valdemar Atterdag who plundered and burned Visby. His most successful opera, it was given sixty times at the Royal Opera and later also in Karlruhe.

== Recording ==
Waldemarsskatten - Anders Larsson, Karin Ingebäck, Martina Dike, Ingrid Tobiasson, Christina Green, Stig Tysklind, Anders Lorentzson, Lars-Erik Jonsson, Lars Avidsson, Lars Arvidsson, Lena Hoel, Frederik Zetterström, Jan Sörberg, Lage Wedin, Richard Collin, Frederick Zetterström Swedish Radio Symphony Orchestra Swedish Radio Choir, B. Tommy Andersson recorded 2001, issued 2CD Sterling 2023
