= Eskil Hemberg =

Swedish composer and conductor

Eskil Hemberg (January 19, 1938 – June 26, 2004 (aged 66)) was a Swedish composer and conductor. He held positions including CEO and artistic director of the Royal Swedish Opera in Stockholm, as well as president of the International Federation for Choral Music.

== Life and career ==
Hemberg studied at the Royal College of Music in Stockholm where he received a Music Teacher's degree in 1961, a higher cantor's degree in 1961, and a higher organist's degree in 1964. Together with Herbert Blomstedt he also conducted the orchestra at the Royal College of Music during this period.

Hemberg became an executive producer for the Swedish Radio's choir, from 1963 until 1970. From 1970 to 1983 he was the planning manager and director of foreign relation at the National Institute of Concerts, and from 1984 to 1987 the general manager and artistic director of the Gothenburg Opera. During this period, he was also the director of the Stockholm University Chorus (1959–84). In 1968-78 Hemberg wrote Messa d'oggi, a choral piece with texts by Quasimodo and Dag Hammarskjöld. Furthermore, in 1970 he wrote a choreographic choral suite, which Hemberg described as "an opera in four acts" based on poems by Robert Graves.

Hemberg served as general manager and artistic director of the Royal Swedish Opera from 1987 until 1996. During his time he put up many notable performances including Ingmar Bergman directing The Bacchae by Daniel Börtz, in 1991.

Hemberg was a member of the Royal Swedish Academy of Music since 1974, the chairman of the Swedish Society of Composers from 1971 until 1983, Vice President of STIM, as well as a board member from 1972 to 1983. He was the president of the International Music Council of UNESCO, as well as chairman of the International Federation for Choral Music (IFCM), and in 2000 he was made The Bud Pearsson Distinguished Professor in Swedish Studies at the Bethany College, Lindsborg, Kansas, USA.

== Awards ==
- 1974 – Member nr. 789 of the Royal Swedish Academy of Music
- 1974 – Musical Society in Stockholm, stipend
- 1978 – Norrby Medal
- 1998 – Atterberg Prize
- 1997 – Culture stipend and prize from The Swedish–Finnish Cultural Foundation

== Selected works ==
- "Psalm" (1999)
- "Anthem" (1998)
- "Thou Who Art Over Us" (1992)
- "Psalmus XCVI" (1992)
- "Concerning My Negotiations With Myself and With God" (1980)
- "Messa d'oggi" (1972)
- "Symptoms of Love" (1970–1972)
- "Signposts" (1968)
- "Zoo" (1962/1965)
