= John Comfort Fillmore =

American musicologist and educator (1843–1898)

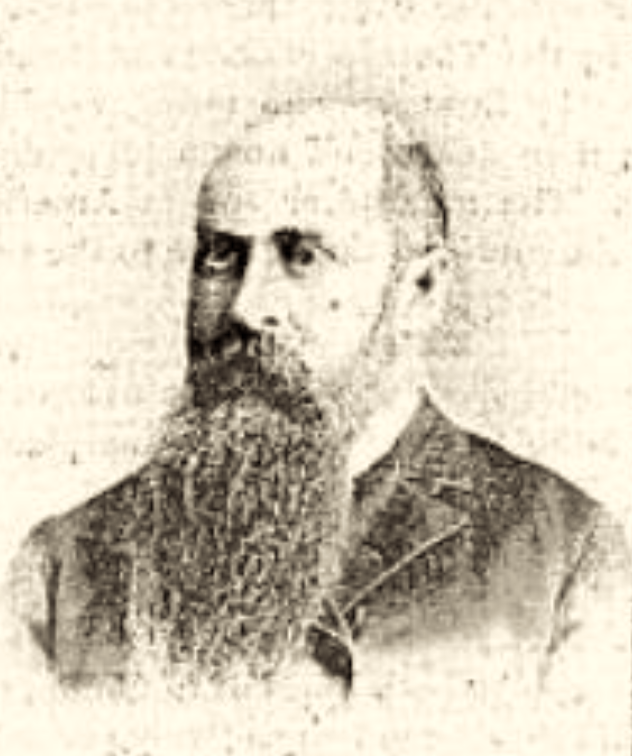
Fillmore in 1890

John Comfort Fillmore (February 4, 1843 – August 14, 1898) was an American music educator, organist, arranger, and ethnomusicologist.

== Early life and education ==
John Comfort Fillmore was born in Franklin, Connecticut, United States, on February 4, 1843. His father worked in Connecticut as the superintendent of a large cotton mill. His distant cousin was the railroad magnate J. A. Fillmore (namesake of Fillmore, California). In 1855 John moved with his family to Ashtabula County, Ohio, where his father worked as a farmer.

Fillmore was trained as an organist in Ohio at Oberlin College under George W. Steele, studying there from 1862 through 1865 while concurrently working as a private in the 150th Ohio Infantry Regiment. He married Elizabeth Adams on October 5, 1865, and immediately following this left for Germany to pursue further studies at the Leipzig Conservatory. He completed his studies there in 1867.

== Career ==
Fillmore returned to Ohio to take the post of interim director of the music conservatory at Oberlin College in 1867. He held this post for a brief period, and continued graduate studies at that school where he earned an M. A. degree in 1870. In the midst of these further studies he taught on the music faculty of Ripon College in Wisconsin from 1868 through 1877. In 1884 he founded the Milwaukee School of Music. He remained director of that institution until 1895.

In 1888 Fillmore was contacted by ethnologist Alice Cunningham Fletcher to assist her study of Native American music. Fletcher perceived her own training in musical analysis inadequate, and relied upon Fillmore's expertise to transfer field recordings into music notation. They were joined by Francis La Flesche. Fillmore believed in an evolutionary construction of anthropology in which all people groups go through the same stages of development, a common view of civilizations in the 19th century. This conception led him to develop a concept of acoustic universalism in which he argued that natural laws of physics and sound were true across the music of all cultures. He perceived that the basic elements of Western music (harmony, melody, rhythm, etc.) had evolved from primitive forms, and believed that the study of Native American music, which he perceived as being more primitive in its development, would enlighten scholars about how Western music evolved.

While studying the music of the Omaha people in the field with Fletcher, Fillmore perceived a "cosmic connection" in their music to that of Richard Wagner. He believed that inherent within Native music there existed implied harmonies. In transcribing Fletcher's field recordings into music notation, with her blessing Fillmore inserted harmonies not originally found in the recordings that were based in the harmonic language of Western music. This was based on his belief that deviations in Native American music from the Western diatonic scale were due to an "underdeveloped sense of pitch discriminations". Fletcher and Fillmore presented their findings at the World's Columbian Exposition in 1893, and that same year the Peabody Museum of Archaeology and Ethnology at Harvard University published Fletcher's A Study of Omaha Indian Music which contained within it a "report of the structural peculiarities of music" authored by Fillmore.

Fillmore was critical of Benjamin Ives Gilman's transcriptions of Native American recordings, believing that they adhered too closely to the whims of the particular individual performer recorded and that the result was transcriptions that were too detailed and too technical to be of ethnographic use.

In 1895 Fillmore relocated to California to care for their daughter who was seriously ill. At that time he joined the faculty of Pomona College in Claremont, California, where he held the posts of professor of music and director of the music school until his death three years later. His daughter died in 1897.

== Death ==
Fillmore left California to give a lecture tour on the East Coast of the United States in 1898. He died on August 15, 1898, in Taftville, Connecticut, shortly before he was scheduled to give a lecture on Native American music to the American Society for the Advancement of Science in Boston. He was visiting his relative, George D. Fillmore, at the time. The cause of death was heart failure.

== Selected publications ==
=== Books ===
- Fillmore, John C. (1884). Pianoforte Music: Its History. Townsend MacCoun.
- Riemens, Hugo (1886). The Nature of Harmony. Translated by John C. Fillmore. Theodore Presser Company.
- Fillmore, John C. (1888). Lessons in Musical History. Theodore Presser Company.
- Fillmore, John C. (1894). A Study of Indian Music. Century Company.

=== Other ===
- Fillmore, John Comfort (1893). "Report on the Structural Peculiarities of the Music" from Alice C. Fletcher "A Study of Omaha Indian Music". Archaeological and Ethnological Papers of the Peabody Museum, vol. 1, no. 5. Cambridge, Mass. Peabody Museum of Archaeology and Ethnology. 59–77.
- Fillmore, John Comfort (October 1893). "A Woman's Song of the Kwakiutl Indians". The Journal of American Folklore. 6 (23): 285–290. doi:10.2307/533907.
- Fillmore, John Comfort (April 1895). "What Do Indians Mean to Do When They Sing, and How Far Do They Succeed?". The Journal of American Folklore. 8 (29): 138–142. doi:10.2307/533176.
- Fillmore, John Comfort (1897). "The forms spontaneously assumed by folk-songs". Music. 12 (8). Chicago: 289–294.
- Fillmore, John Comfort (April 1899). "The Harmonic Structure of Indian Music". American Anthropologist. 1 (2): 297–318.
