= Canticum Calamitatis Maritimae =

Choral composition by Jaakko Mäntyjärvi

Canticum Calamitatis Maritimae ("Song of Maritime Calamity") is an eight-part, a cappella classical choral composition by the Finnish composer Jaakko Mäntyjärvi. Completed in 1997, the piece was inspired by the MS Estonia disaster of 1994. It won third prize in the European composition competition for cathedral choirs in 1997. The piece is approximately 12 minutes in duration.

== Text ==
The text of the piece is taken from three sources: the Catholic Requiem Mass, Psalm 107: "They that go down to the sea in ships...", and the report of the disaster from the weekly Latin-language Finnish news service, Nuntii Latini.

The piece opens with a sigh followed by the female singers whispering, individually, a line of text from the Requiem Mass:

"Lux aeterna luceat eis, Domine, et lux perpetua luceat eis."

In English:

"May eternal light shine upon them, Lord, and may perpetual light shine upon them."

After a lamenting, wordless soprano solo, the piece continues with the Nuntii Latini report, recited by a baritone or tenor cantor. The soloist announces the disaster and the initial casualty figures. After this, the piece moves into the text of Psalm 107, in Latin:

Qui descendunt mare in navibus, facientes operationem in aquis multis: 24 ipsi viderunt opera Domini, et mirabilia ejus in profundo. 25 Dixit, et stetit spiritus procellæ, et exaltati sunt fluctus ejus. 26 Ascendunt usque ad cælos, et descendunt usque ad abyssos; anima eorum in malis tabescebat. 27 Turbati sunt, et moti sunt sicut ebrius, et omnis sapientia eorum devorata est. 28 Et clamaverunt ad Dominum cum tribularentur; et de necessitatibus eorum eduxit eos. 29 Et statuit procellam ejus in auram, et siluerunt fluctus ejus. 30 Et lætati sunt quia siluerunt; et deduxit eos in portum voluntatis eorum. 31

In English translation:

They that go down to the sea in ships, doing business in the great waters: 24 These have seen the works of the Lord, and his wonders in the deep. 25 He said the word, and there arose a storm of wind: and the waves thereof were lifted up. 26 They mount up to the heavens, and they go down to the depths: their soul pined away with evils. 27 They were troubled, and reeled like a drunken man; and all their wisdom was swallowed up. 28 And they cried to the Lord in their affliction: and he brought them out of their distresses. 29 And he turned the storm into a breeze: and its waves were still. 30 And they rejoiced because they were still: and he brought them to the haven which they wished for.

The piece ends with the words "requiem aeternam": "eternal rest".

== Musical effects ==
The piece uses vocalized effects to mimic a number of sounds associated with the disaster. The whispering voices at the beginning of the work suggest the hiss of sea-spray or radio static; the tune sung by the soprano soloist suggests the hymn "Nearer, My God, to Thee", which folk legend identifies as the tune played by the band on the deck of the RMS Titanic as it went down; the tenor soloist who initially reports on the disaster mimics a cantor from a Catholic requiem mass; humming in the bass part suggests the hum of the ship's engine. Later in the piece, Jaakko Mäntyjärvi uses a tight chord to suggest the shriek of shearing metal. The rhythm of the "anima eorum" section mimics the transmission of an "SOS" signal in Morse Code. Chords that occur late in the piece—set to the text "...et clamaverunt ad Dominum / cum tribularentur..." are sung in open, parallel fourths, suggesting funerary bagpipes. The final words of the piece-- "requiem aeternam"—are voiced in the bass and soprano registers, suggesting foghorns and marine bells, respectively.

== Recordings ==
- The Esoterics on Elementia
- The Phoenix Bach Choir on Eternal Rest

== See also ==
- "MV Estonia final report, Safety Investigation Authority, Finland"
- "Estonia" (song), a song by the British progressive rock band Marillion
- Incantatio maris aestuosi, a choral work by Veljo Tormis
