= Axel Klinckowström =

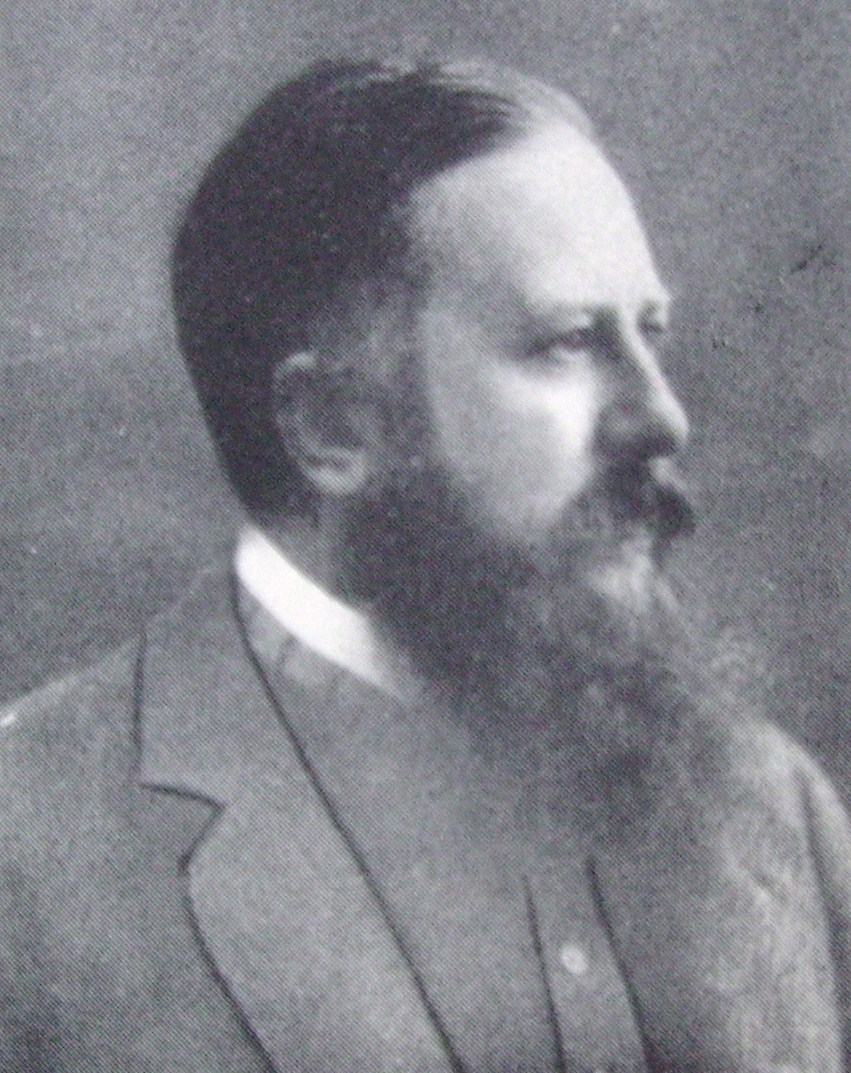
Axel Klinckowström.

Axel Alexander Camille Rudolf Emanuel Klinckowström (24 December 1867 – 12 May 1936) was a Swedish baron, zoologist, Arctic and Antarctic explorer, fiction writer and memoirist. Among his works were the libretto Waldemarsskatten from 1898 and the play Olof Trätälja from 1908.

Klinckowström was born in a well-to-do family of Rudolf and Marie in Darmstadt. He was for the most time taken care of by his mother and grandparents. In school he was influenced by contemporaries Gustaf Nordenskiöld, Leonard Jägerskiöld and Henning Boheman. He was a keen sharpshooter and athlete but was excused from military service due to flat-footedness and being left-handed. His father wished that he would run the Stafsund estate and sent him to the University of Agricultural Sciences in Ultuna but he did not continue there and went to the University of Stockholm where he studied under the zoologist Wilhelm Leche. He discontinued due to disagreements with Leche. In 1890 he went on an expedition to Spitzbergen with Nordenskiöld and in 1891 his grandmother sponsored a trip to Surinam. In 1895 he went to study at Würzburg and then worked at Stockholm University. He inherited his family property of Stafsund in 1902. He travelled extensively and collected natural history specimens for the National Museum.

The Svalbard fjord Klinckowströmfjorden is named after him. He married Thyra Gyldén and they had three children. His play Olof Trätälja earned him awards from the Swedish Academy in 1907.
