= Song of the Athenians =

Piece for Choir and Orchestra by Jean Sibelius

- by Jean Sibelius
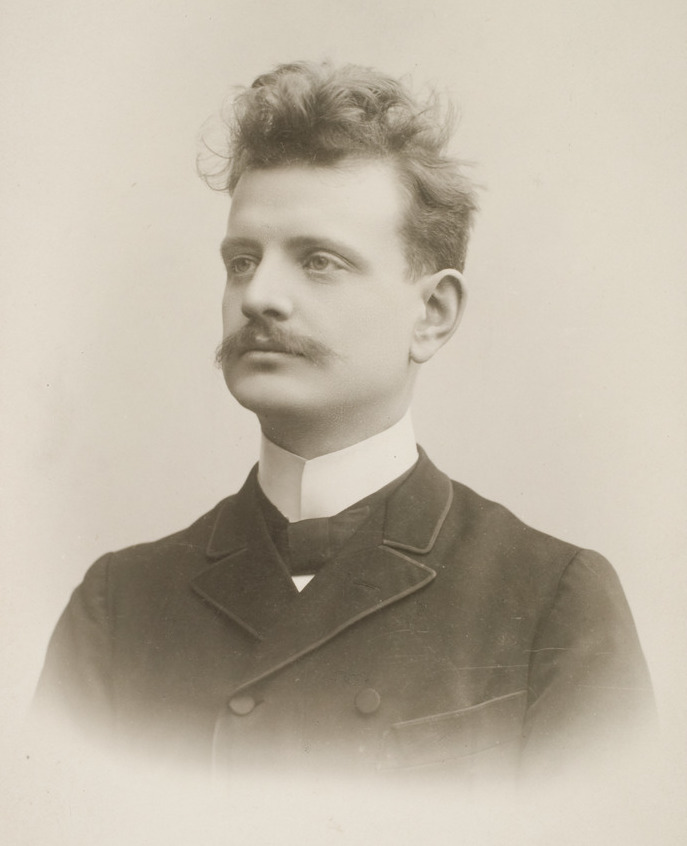
- The composer (c. 1895)
- Native name: Athenarnes sång
- Opus: 31/3
- Based on: War Song of Tyrtaeus by Viktor Rydberg
- Composed: 1899
- Duration: 3 minutes

Premiere
- Date: 26 April 1899
- Location: Helsinki, Grand Duchy of Finland
- Conductor: Jean Sibelius
- Performers: Helsinki Philharmonic Society

The Song of the Athenians (Athenarnes sång) is a work for boys chorus, male chorus, and orchestra by Jean Sibelius, the last of his Op. 31. The song runs approximately 3 minutes.

== Background ==
Sibelius set Viktor Rydberg's “War Song of Tyrtaeus”, an excerpt from the poem Dexippos, which is set in Athens in AD 267. Completed in 1899, shortly after the February Manifesto restricted Finnish autonomy, the Song of the Athenians was premiered in Helsinki on 26 April of that year, alongside Sibelius's First Symphony. Biographer Andrew Barnett discerns a spirit of protest in the work and writes that, from a Finnish perspective, the Athenians were an obvious symbol of the Finns themselves.

The work was the one of three published under the title 3 songs for chorus, Op. 31. Each song, however, has a different purpose and instrumentation.

The British premiere of the work was on 23 August 1905 at the Promenade Concerts at Queen's Hall, conducted by Henry Wood.

== Reception ==
The work instantly became a symbol of Finnish patriotism and resistance to Russia oppression. Sibelius, a composer who received an otherwise mixed reception, became a leading figure of national resistance. The work was performed in every possible arrangement, and schoolchildren across the country could sing it from memory. The work still occupies a strong part of the Finnish national identity.

Sibelius himself expressed annoyance that the work overshadowed his first symphony.

== Recordings ==
- Lahti Symphony Orchestra, June 6, 2000.
- Erik T. Tawaststjerna, Piano, January 31, 1987.
- Folke Gräsbeck, Piano
