= Berlin Opera House (Kitchener, Ontario) =

Former event venue in Kitchener, Ontario (1896–1924)

Berlin Opera House was a theatre located at 16 Queen Street in Kitchener, Ontario (then called Berlin, Ontario). Built by Abel Walper in 1896, it was attached to the Walper Hotel. It opened in September 1896 and sat 800 people. The Wilbur Opera Company opened the theatre with three opera performances. On November 9, 1896, the theatre screened the first moving picture shown in the history of the town of Kitchener. George O. Philip was the first lessee of the theatre. Productions staged under his leadership included the opera Faust, the operetta H.M.S. Pinafore, and the plays Richelieu and Charley's Aunt. By 1909 it was renamed the Star Theatre and was operating as a cinema and venue for vaudeville. The theatre was demolished in 1924.
