= Harald Agersnap =

Danish composer, conductor, cellist, and pianist

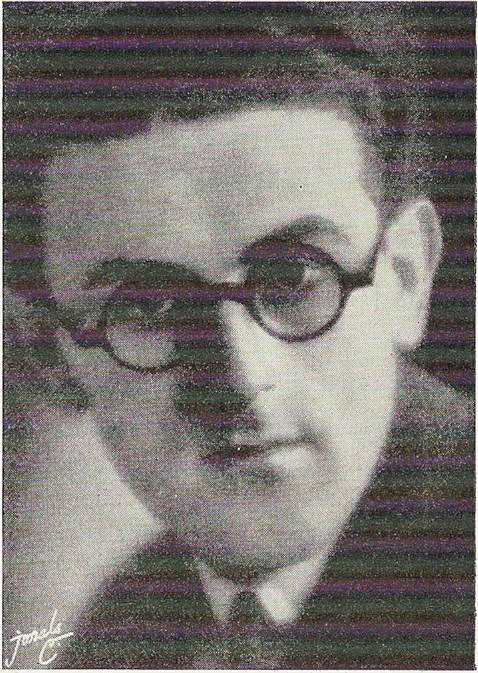

Harald Søltoft Agersnap (March 2, 1899 – January 16, 1982) was a Danish composer, conductor, cellist, and pianist. He studied with Otto Malling and Carl Nielsen, as well as with his father, Hans Agersnap.

Agersnap's training in music began at the Royal Danish Academy of Music where he studied from 1914 to 1917. He began his career as an orchestral cellist. Before that, he had been a conductor in two places: at the Royal Danish Theatre (1926–29) and at The Comedy House (1929–30). From 1932-38 he also led the amateur male choir Bel Canto. Agersnap's association with the Royal Danish Theatre began in 1931 as a pianist. In 1934 he was appointed choirmaster, a position he held until 1966.

Agersnap worked as a composer in numerous genres. He composed the music for the plays Aladdin, Feast At Solhaug and The Princess and Half The Kingdom. He also created chamber music, orchestral music, and over 90 songs during his life.

His manuscripts are held at the Royal Danish Library.

== Personal life ==
Agersnap married physiotherapist Gertrud Mackeprang on September 27, 1926, in Copenhagen.
