= Andreas Hallén =

Swedish Romantic composer, conductor and music teacher

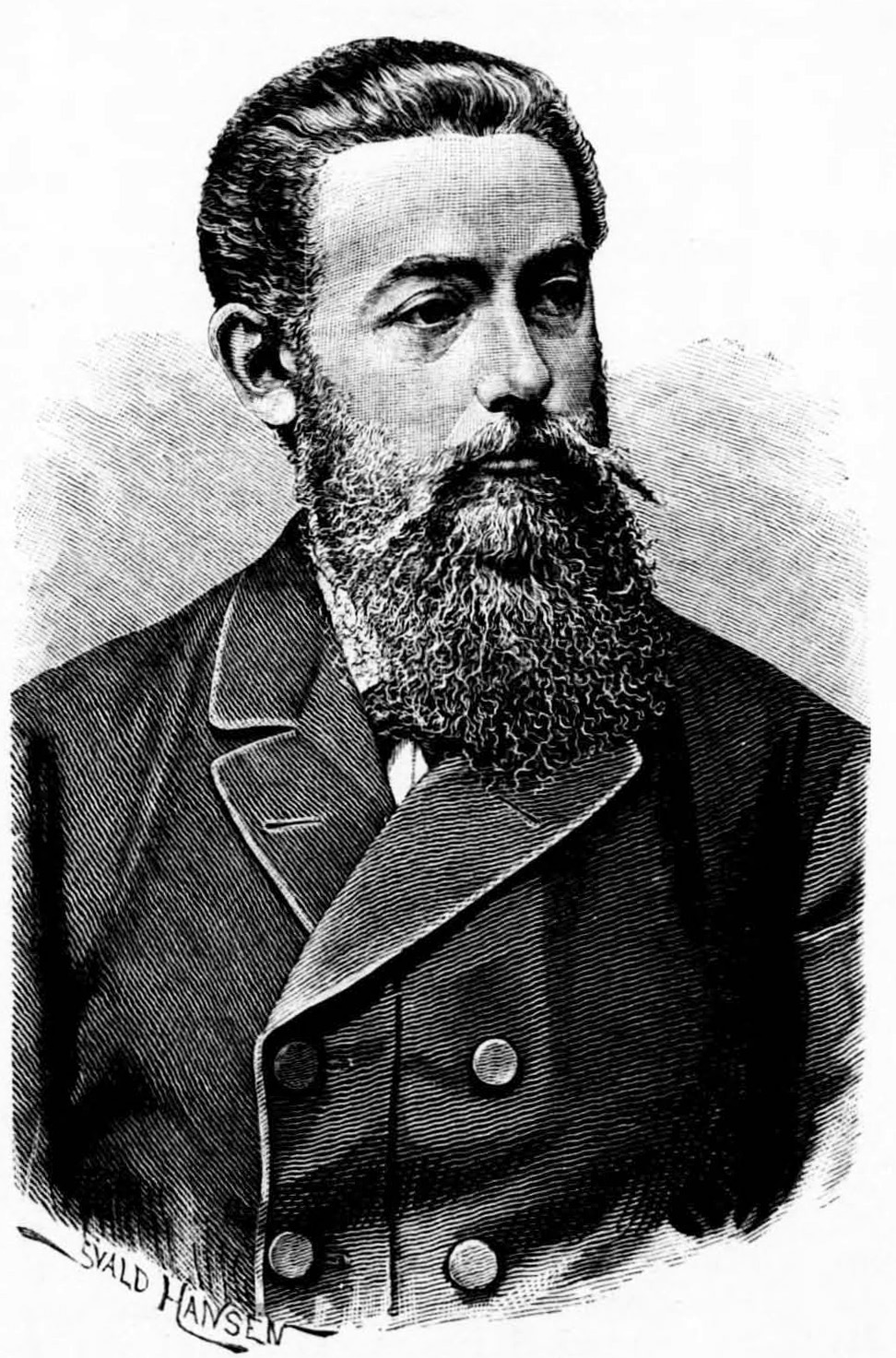

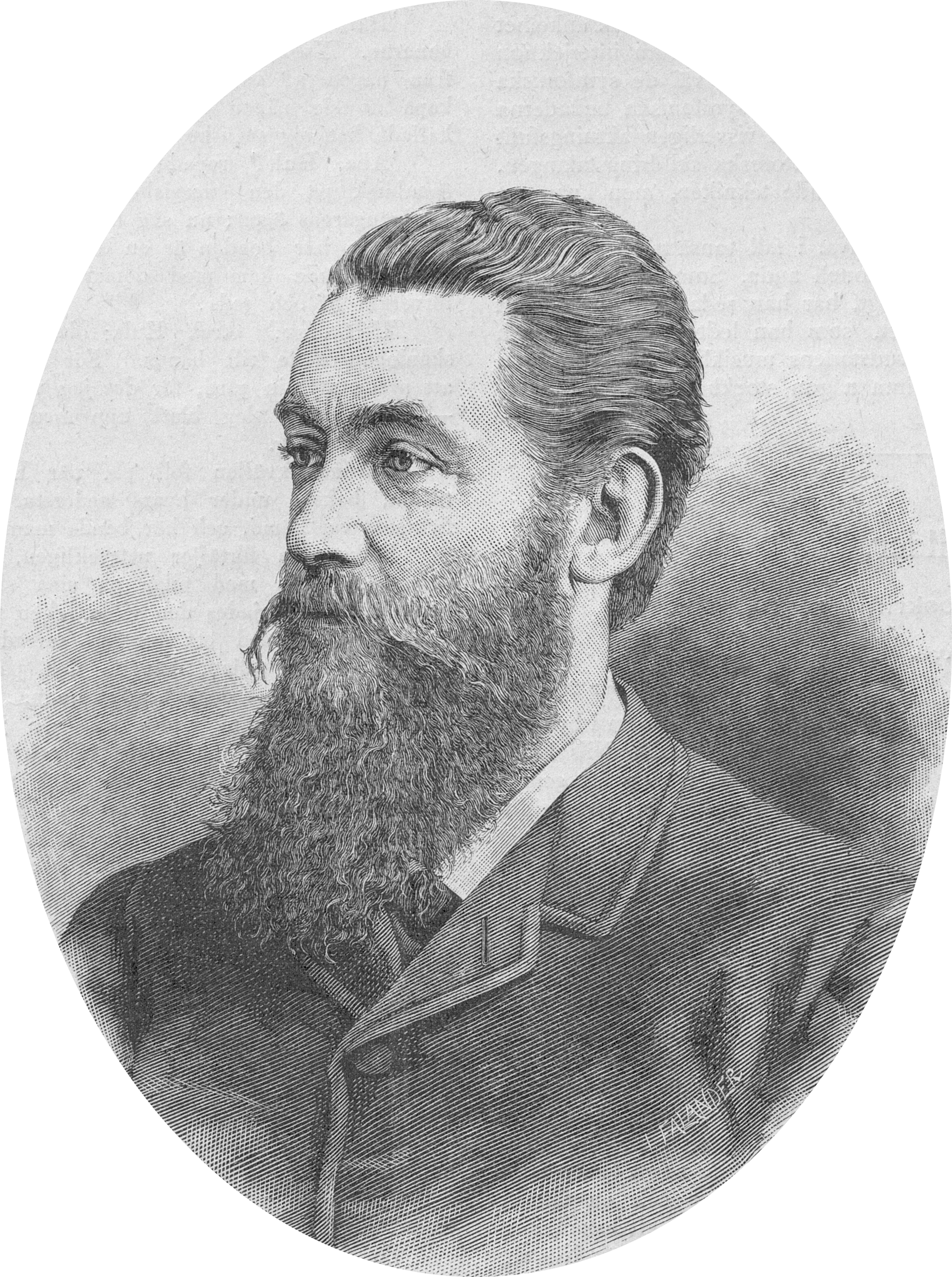
Andreas Hallén.

Johan Andreas Hallén (22 December 1846 – 11 March 1925) was a Swedish Romantic composer, conductor and music teacher, primarily known for his operas, which were heavily influenced by Richard Wagner’s music dramas. Hallén was born in Gothenburg and died in Stockholm, but the early years of his career and most of his education were in Germany. Like his Norwegian contemporary Edvard Grieg and many other composers the same generation, Hallén frequently evokes the folk music and folk stories of his home country in his compositions. According to the musicologist Axel Helmer, however, "The salient feature of his style [...], and the one which strongly affected contemporary reaction, is its close, almost derivative relationship to German music," especially Wagner. Around 1885, Hallén returned to Sweden and continued to conduct and compose, and in later years taught composition at the Stockholm Conservatory.

== Works ==
=== Operas ===
- Harald der Wiking (1881)
- Harald Viking (1884) (Revised and translated version of Harald der Wiking)
- Hexfällan (Witch’s trap) (1896)
- Waldemarsskatten (Valdemar’s Treasure) (1899)
- Valborgsmässa (Walpurgis Night) (1902) (Revised version of Hexfällan)
