= Eduard Holst =

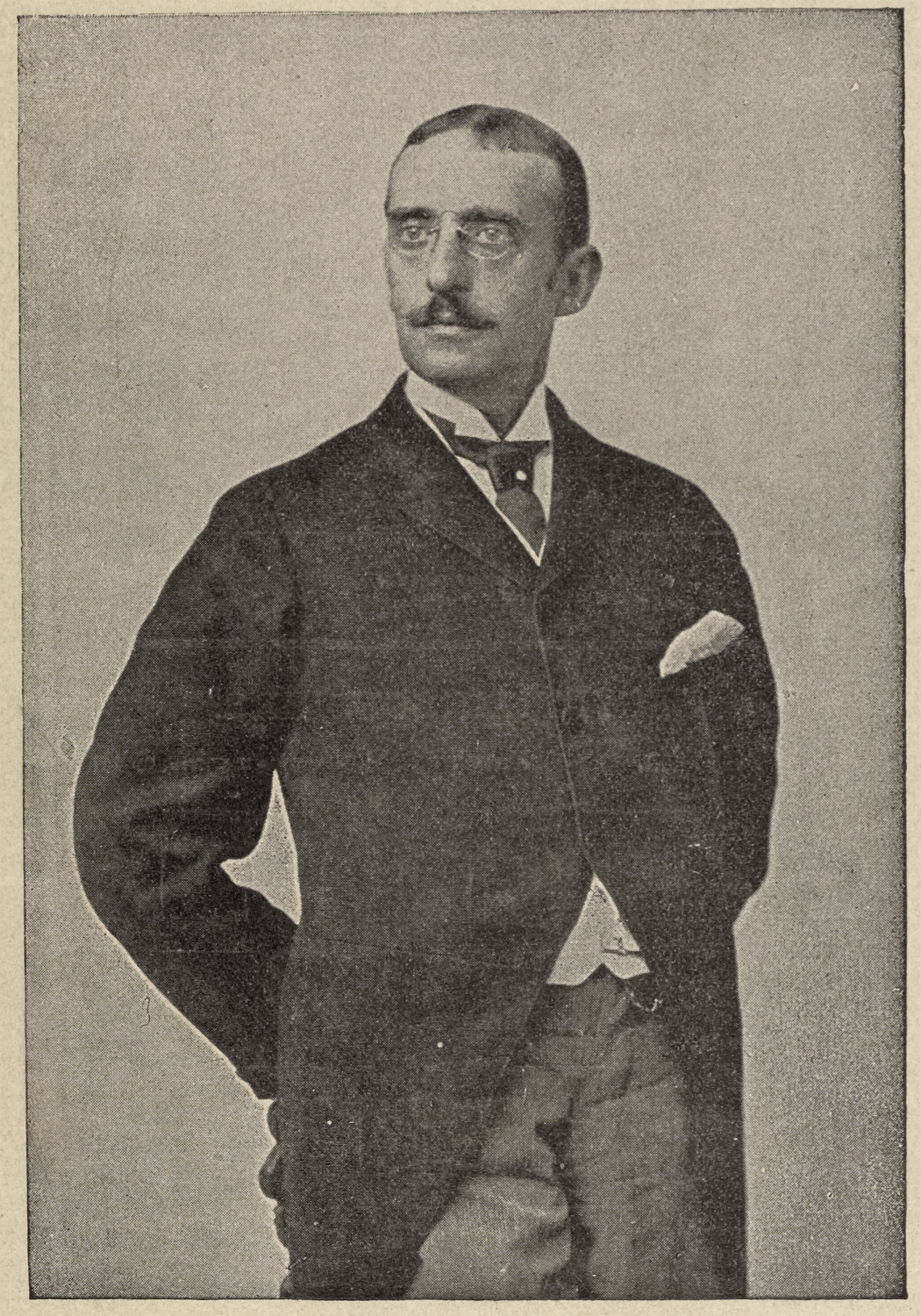
1893 portrait of Holst

Eduard Holst (1843 – 4 February 1899) was a Danish playwright, composer, actor, dancer, and dance master. His name is spelled sometimes Edward Holst or Edvard Holst.

Holst was born in Copenhagen. His compositions include songs and piano solo works. He was very prolific and a 1907 biography states he produced over two thousand works. He died in New York City.

== Works ==
- Ilma, Grande Valse de Concert (1878) (later republished/renamed in the U.S. as "Diana")
- Bloom & Blossom, a Waltz (1887)
- Autumn Leaf, a Polka for Children (1887)
- Dance of The Demon (Grand Galop de Concert) (1888)
- Shower of Melodies, part of a six work series for children
- Our National Guardsmen, ded. to: Col. Emmons Clark 7th Regiment N.G.S.N.Y. (1889)
- Follow Me (March) (1890)
- La Tanda (Spanish Dance) (1892)
- Young Hearts (Polka) (1892)
- Marine Band March (1893)
- Lily Waltz (1895)
- Violet Galop (1895)
- Lilac York Dance (1895)
- Carnation March (1895)
- Pansy Polka (1895)
- Rose Gavotte (1895)
- Brocken Revels (Grand Galop De Concert) (1896)
- Our Flats, a comic opera, premiered in 1897 in New York
- Bicycle Race (Galop) (1897)
- Shooting Stars Galop (1897)
- Battle of Manila (1898)
- Hot Water, a comedy
- The Little Maid in Pink
- Boys of Columbia (Two Step)
- Danse Espanola
- March of the Dwarfs
- Sweet Clover Waltz
- Revel of the Witches

=== Public domain sheet music ===
- Eduard Holst Sheet Music Search, Library of Congress, Performing Arts Encyclopedia
- Eduard Holst Sheet Music Search, Levy Sheet Music Collection, Johns Hopkins University
- IN harmony search, Indiana University
- Free scores by Eduard Holst at the International Music Score Library Project (IMSLP)
