= Cave of Elijah =

Place described in the Hebrew Bible where the prophet Elijah sought refuge

Coordinates: 32.829816°N 34.969588°E

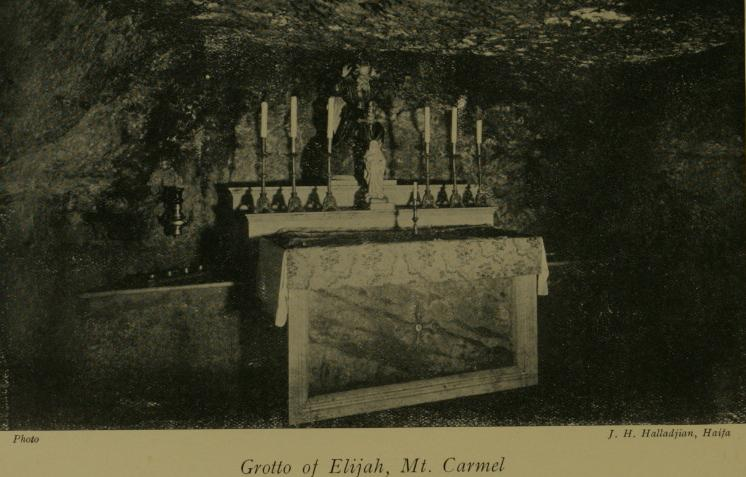
Two caves on Mount Carmel in Haifa are associated with Elijah; the photo above shows the one inside Stella Maris Monastery

Cave of Elijah is the name used for two grottoes on Mount Carmel, in Haifa, Israel, associated with Biblical prophet Elijah. According to tradition, Elijah is believed to have prayed at a grotto before challenging the priests of Baal on Mount Carmel (1 Kings 18), and to have hidden in either the same or in another nearby grotto from the wrath of Jezebel (1 Kings 19:1–3).

Two grottoes on Mount Carmel, in Haifa, have been historically referred to as "the Cave of Elijah". The main shrine known as the "Cave of Elijah" is located on Haifa's Allenby Road, on Mount Carmel, approximately 40 m above sea level. For centuries, it has been a destination for Jewish, Christian, Muslim and Druze pilgrims. The Cave of Elijah in Allenby Road is divided into twos sections for praying, one for men and one for women; the cave is behind a velvet curtain. The Cave is also known as el-Khader in Arabic. The Druze regard it as holy, and many among them identify Elijah as "el-Khidr", the green prophet who symbolizes water and life.

The cave has been considered by some as miracle-working. Sick people are said to be brought to the Cave in hope that they will be cured.

A second grotto, also associated with Elijah, is located nearby, under the altar of the main church of the Stella Maris Monastery, also on Mount Carmel.

== Biblical story ==
In the Bible, in the First Books of Kings 19:9, prophet Elijah takes shelter in a cave on Mount Horeb after traveling for 40 days and 40 nights. Upon awakening, he is spoken to by God.

Before an assembly on the summit of Mount Carmel, Elijah challenges on the Canaanite priests to seek fire from their god Baal to light a sacrifice. When Baal fails to respond to their pleading, Elijah rebuilds the ruined altar of the Lord and offers his own sacrifice. Immediately, fire from heaven consumes the offering, even though it had been soaked in water.

== Historical sources ==
=== Main shrine ===
"The Cave of Elijah" has been presented primarily as part of Mount Carmel in the works of travelers, historians, pilgrims and other visitors.

The Pilgrim of Bordeaux who visited Mount Carmel in 333 or 334, didn't mention the cave in his notes about, only writing that "there is Mount Carmel, there Elijah sacrificed …".

Ioannes Phokas, a pilgrim who supposedly went to the cave in 1185, writes: "After these (places) there is Mt. Carmel, (…) At the end of the ridge of Mt. Carmel facing the sea, there is the cave of the Prophet Elijah, …".

A Jewish pilgrim who supposedly visited the cave during the period between 1270 and 1291 wrote: "There on the slopes of Mt. Carmel is a cave, and there the synagogue dedicated to Elijah, be he remembered for good. Above the cave, on the top of the mountain, there is Elisha's Cave."

English prelate and traveller, Richard Pococke, wrote in his notes in 1738 that Elijah had lived and worshipped in the prayer hall of the cave, and that the site was venerated by Christians, Jews and Muslims, and that it was visited on Elijah's birthday. Pococke indicated that visiting the cave on the Saturday after Sabbath of Consolation had become a custom.
