= Monastery of Our Lady of Mount Carmel =

Monastery in Haifa, Israel

Coordinates: 32.8179°N 34.9787°E

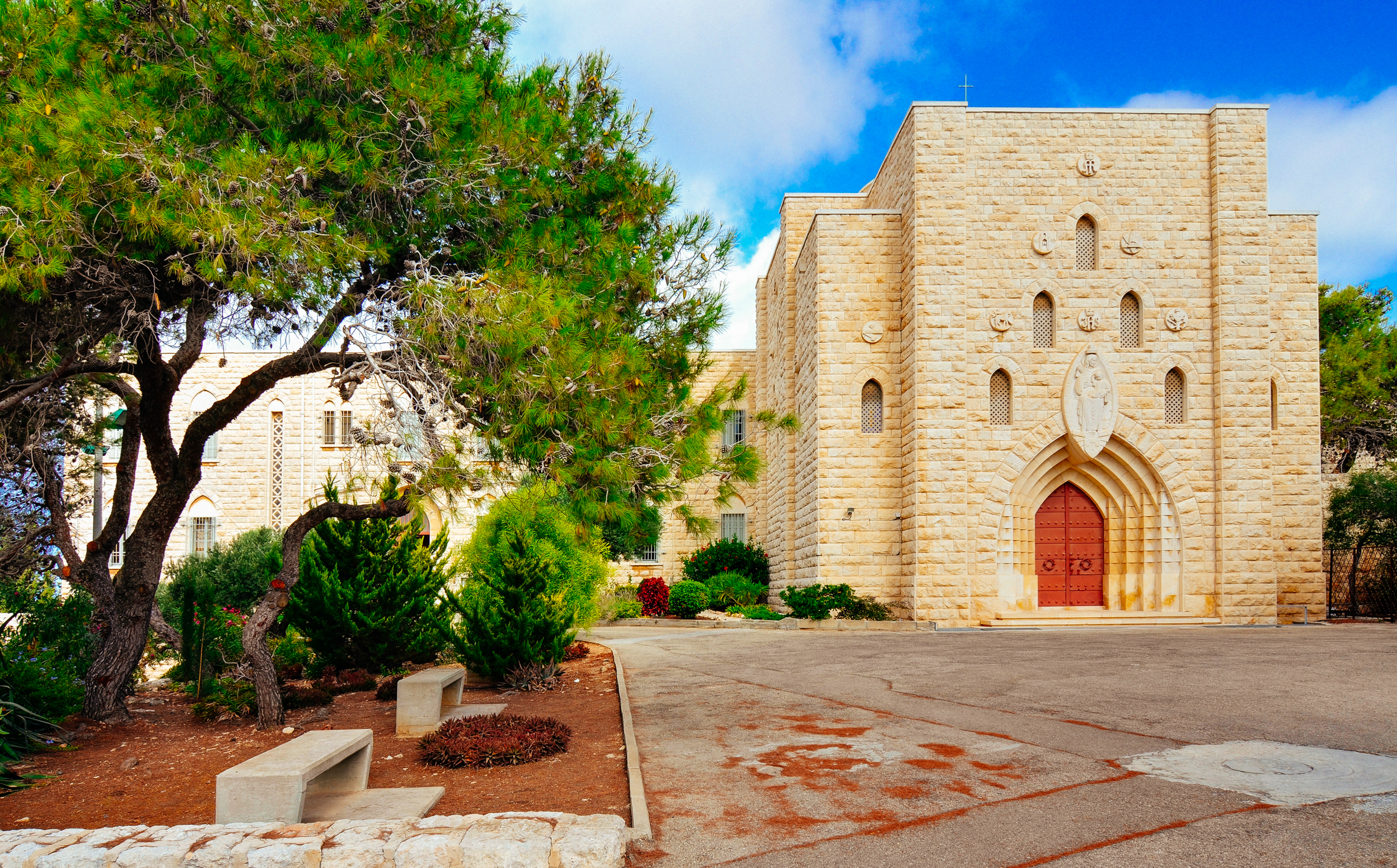

Location
- Interactive map of Monastery of Our Lady of Mount Carmel

The Monastery of Our Lady of Mount Carmel is a Catholic Christian monastery for Carmelite nuns that sits on the slope of Mount Carmel, in Haifa, Israel. The monastery is dedicated to Our Lady of Mount Carmel.

The community of Our Lady of Mount Carmel was founded in 1892 by a group of French Carmelite nuns. As of 2022, a community of about twenty sisters is made up of women from ten countries and four continents. The common language spoken inside the monastery is French.

The Monastery, which is exclusive to nuns, is located less than 3 km uphill from, and southeast of, the Stella Maris Monastery for Carmelite monks, also located on the slope of Mount Carmel in Haifa.
