= Stella Maris Monastery =

19th-century Discalced Carmelite monastery in Haifa, Israel

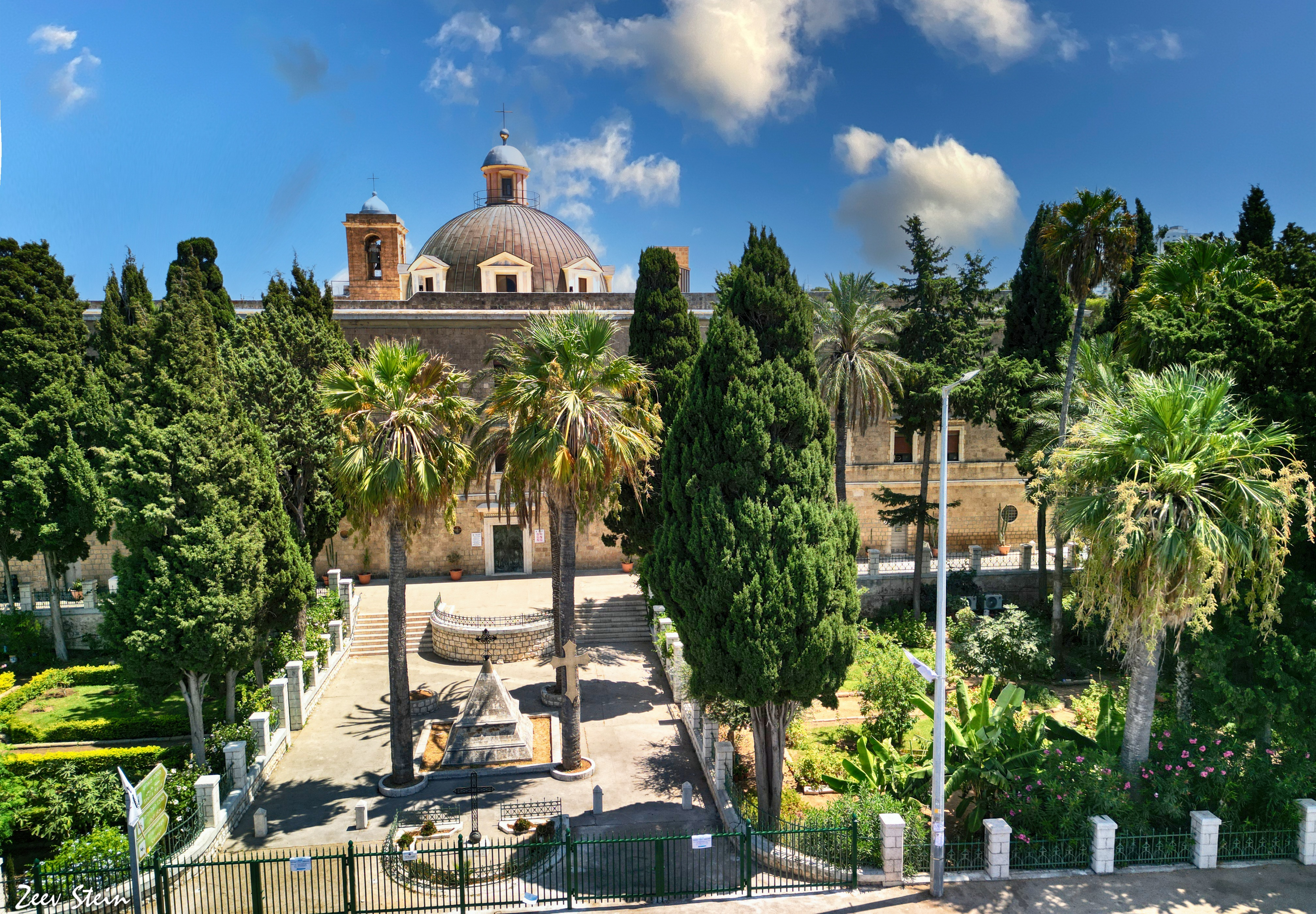
- Stella Maris Monastery on Mount Carmel
- Interactive map of Stella Maris Monastery

Monastery information
- Order: Discalced Carmelite Order
- Established: 1631

Architecture
- Completed date: 1836

Site
- Location: Haifa, Israel
- Coordinates: 32°49′36″N 34°58′13″E
- Other information: Facade faces South

The Stella Maris Monastery is a Discalced Carmelite convent for friars. The convent is located on the slopes of Mount Carmel in Israel, where origins of the Carmelite order lie.

The main church inside the Stella Maris Monastery is said to contain the Cave of Elijah, a grotto associated with the Biblical prophet Elijah. For centuries, it has been a destination for Jewish, Christian, Muslim and Druze pilgrims.

The convent is to be distinguished from the nearby Monastery of Our Lady of Mount Carmel for Discalced Carmelite nuns, located higher up on Mount Carmel.

== History ==
=== Crusader-period Carmelite beginnings ===
In the 12th century, during the Kingdom of Jerusalem rule of the region, groups of hermits began to inhabit the caves of this area in imitation of the prophet Elijah. In the early 13th century, their leader and prior (referred to in the rule only as "Brother B", although sometimes claimed despite an absence of supporting evidence to be either Saint Brocard or Berthold of Calabria) asked the Latin Patriarch of Jerusalem, Albert of Jerusalem, to provide the group with a written rule of life, which he did (the Rule of Saint Albert).

This was the originating act of the order, who took the name Order of the Brothers of the Blessed Virgin Mary of Mount Carmel. An oratory was dedicated to the Blessed Virgin Mary under her title Our Lady, Star of the Sea, the latter part of which translates in Latin to Stella Maris. Within a few decades, when the capital of the Crusader Kingdom of Jerusalem, Akko, fell in 1291 to the Mamluks. The Carmelites were forced to leave the Holy Land and spread throughout Europe, where, from 1238 onwards, the order had begun to found houses — at the end of Louis IX of France's first crusade to the Holy Land in 1254, he had taken six Carmelites back to France with him.

=== New location (1631-1761) ===
In 1631 the Discalced branch of the order returned to the Holy Land, led by the Venerable Prosper. He had a small convent constructed on the promontory at Mount Carmel, and the friars lived there until 1761, when Daher al-Umar, the then effectively independent ruler of Galilee, ordered them to vacate the site and demolish the monastery.

=== Current location: first building (1761-1821) ===
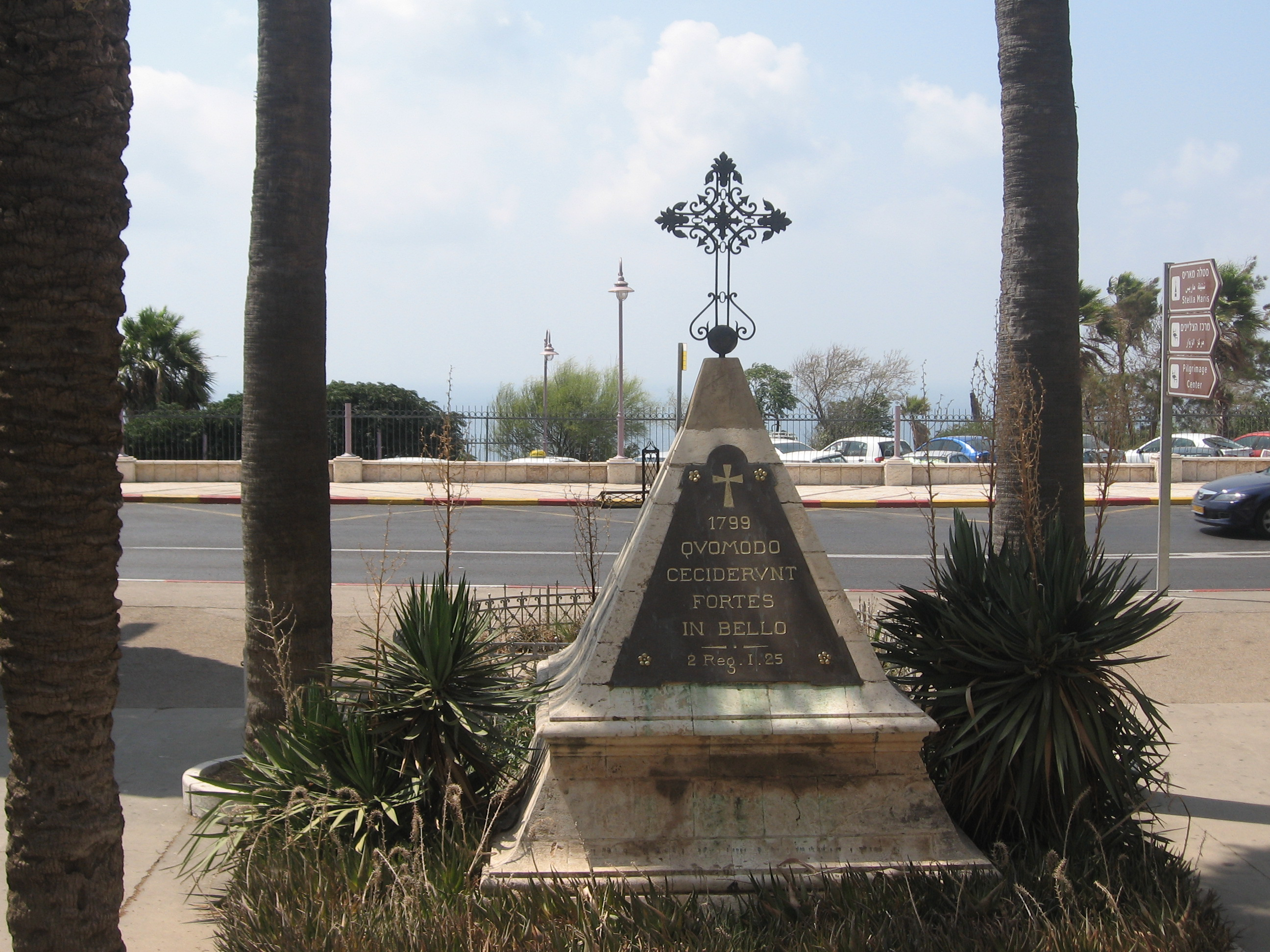
The monument to Napoleon's soldiers

The order then moved to the present location, which is directly above a grotto where the prophet Elijah is said to have lived. Here they built a large church and monastery, first clearing the site of the ruins of a medieval Greek Orthodox church, known as "the Abbey of Margaret the Virgin" and a chapel, thought to date back to the time of the Byzantine Empire.

This new church was seriously damaged in Napoleon's 1799 campaign. Sick and wounded French soldiers were accommodated in the convent, and when Napoleon withdrew, the Turks slaughtered them and drove out the friars.

In 1821, Abdullah Pasha of Acre ordered the ruined church to be totally destroyed, so that it could not serve as a fort for his enemies, while he attacked Jerusalem. The masonry was used to build Abdullah Pasha's summer palace and a lighthouse, which were sold back to the Carmelite order in 1846.

=== Current building (1836) ===
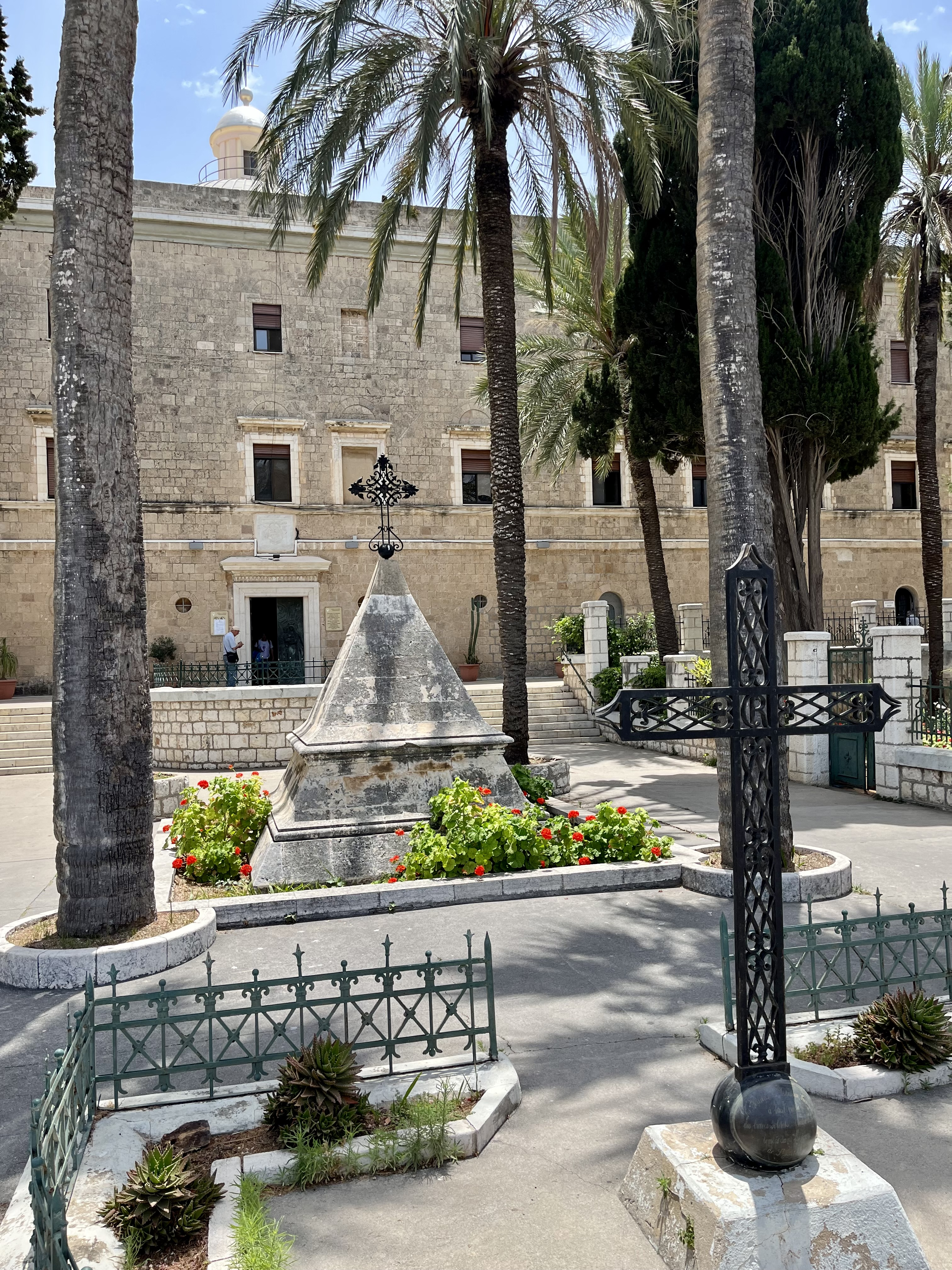
Entrance to the convent

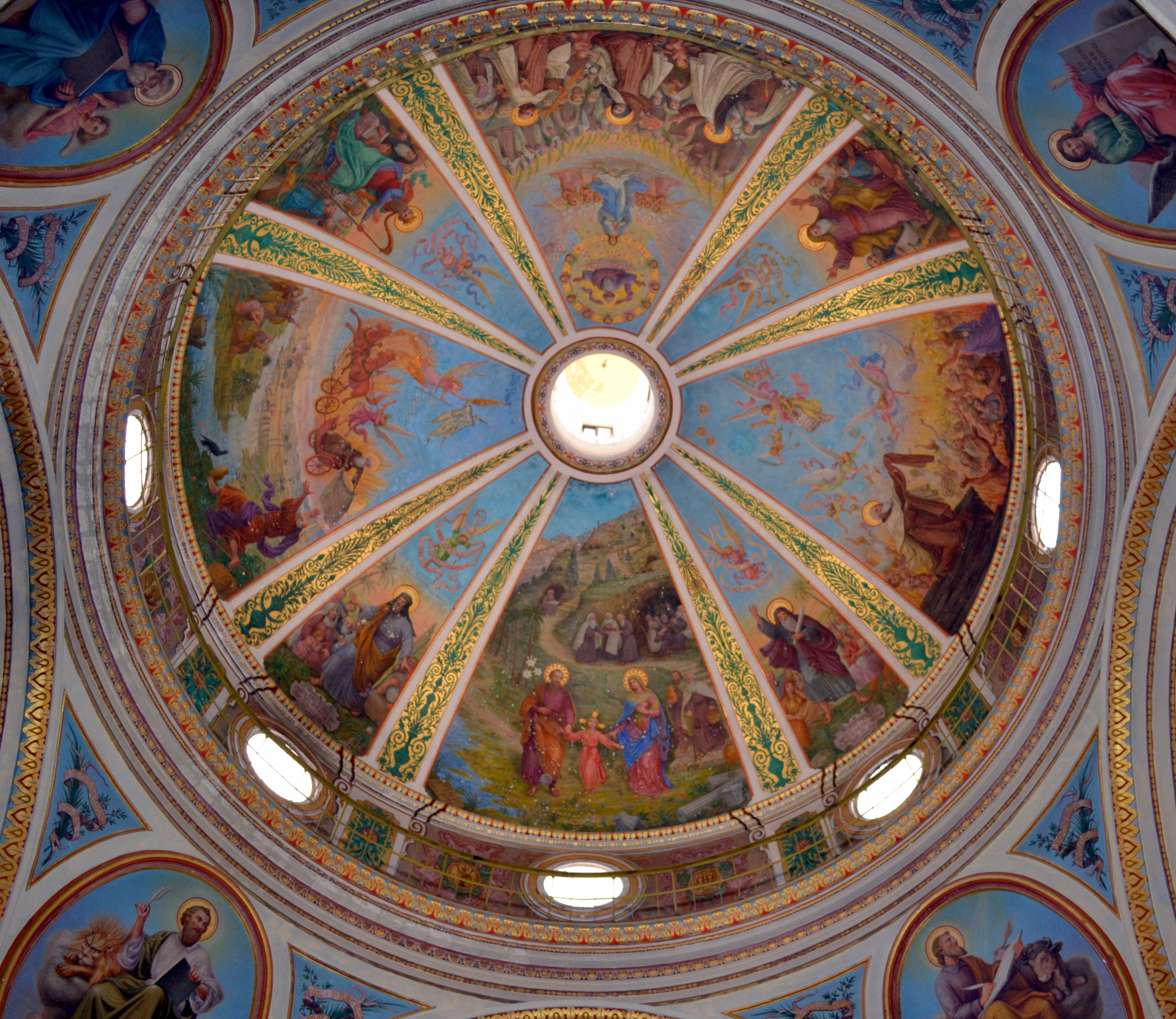
Dome of the Stella Maris monastery

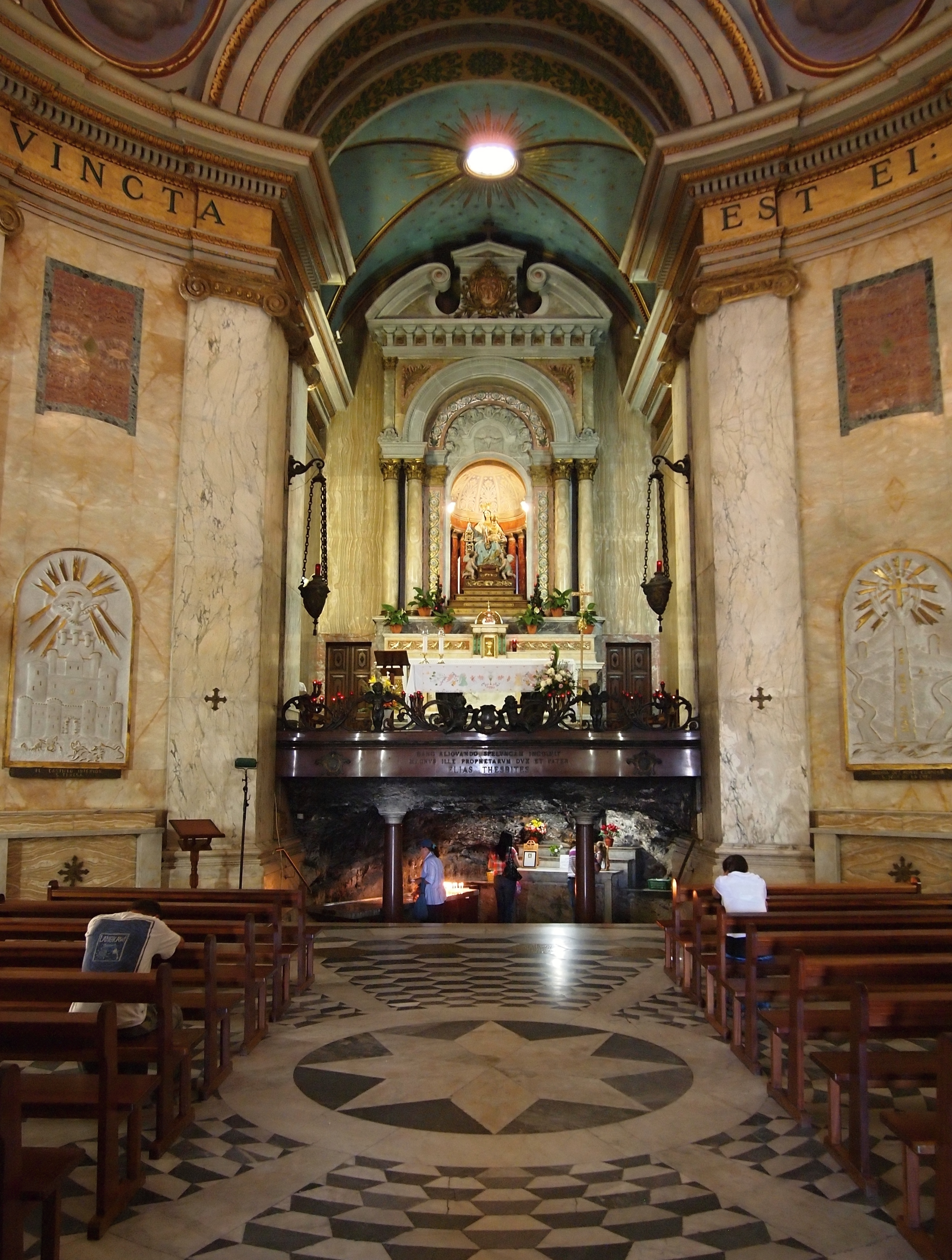
Church interior with the cave of Elijah visible under the altar

The current church and monastery was opened in 1836. Three years later Pope Gregory XVI bestowed the title of a Minor Basilica on the sanctuary.

== Description ==
=== Monastery ===
The monastery serves as a centre of Carmelite spirituality throughout the world. The coat of arms of the order is mounted right above the entrance door. During the erection of the church, friars were assaulted by their neighbors and had to defend their property and the church guests. As a result, the monastery's ground floor is built out of thick walls with few and small openings covered by bars.

=== Main church ===
The monastery's main church resembles the shape of a cross. Its dome is decorated by colorful paintings based on motifs from both the Old and New Testament: Elijah rising to heaven, David stringing his harp, the prophet Isaiah, the Holy Family and the Four Evangelists. Latin inscriptions of biblical verses are written around the dome.

The altar stands on an elevated platform situated above a small cave associated with Elijah. The cave can be reached from the nave by descending a few steps and holds a stone altar with a small statue of Prophet Elijah. The altar above the cave is dominated by a statue of Our Lady of Mount Carmel — the patroness of the Carmelites — carrying Jesus in her lap and holding the Brown scapular in her right hand.

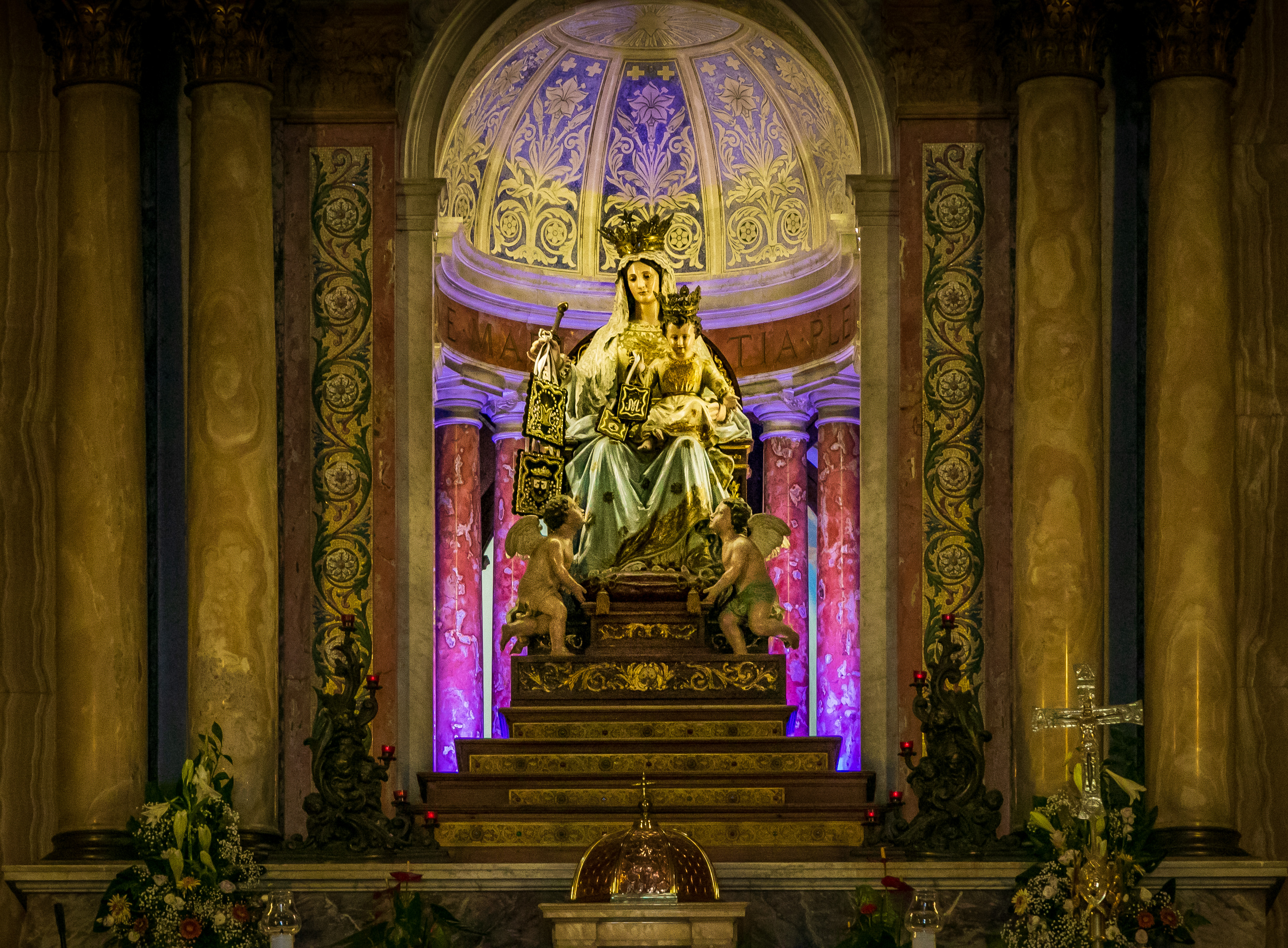
Main church altar with the statue of Our Lady of Mount Carmel

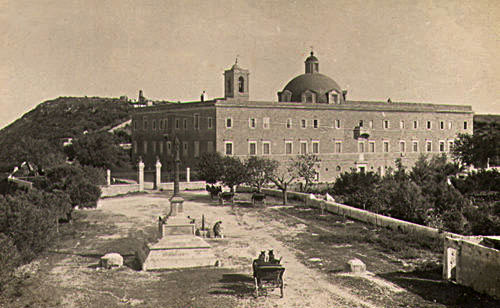
Stella Maris monastery at the end of the 19th century

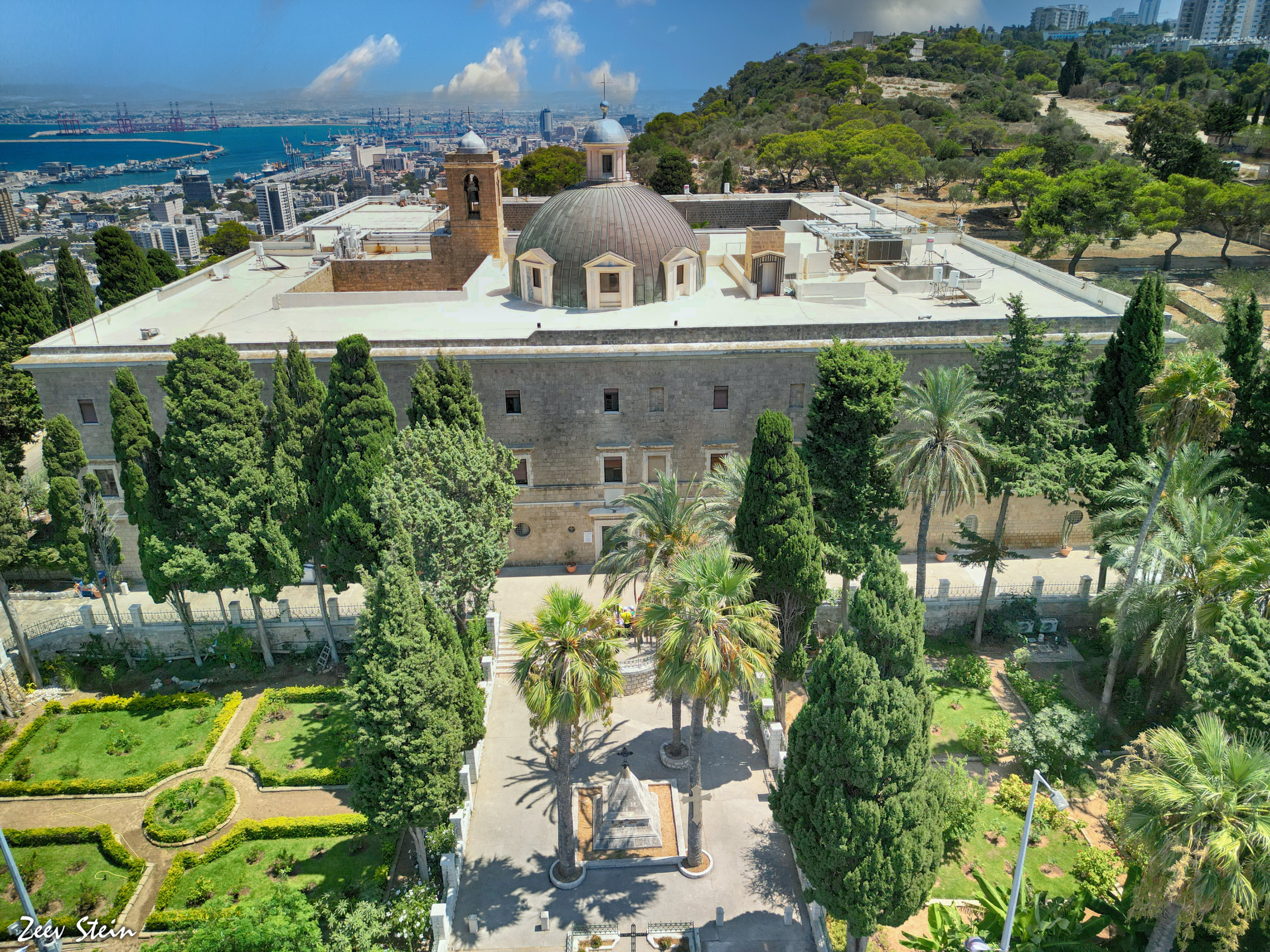
Stella Maris monastery in the 21st century

New embossments dedicated to certain Carmelite saints are hoisted on all four corners of the central hall. On the western wall of the church is a large organ.

== Annual procession ==
During the First World War, the statue of Our Lady of Mount Carmel was removed from the church and placed in a safer place in Haifa. After the war, in 1919, it was brought back to its place in a procession. Since then, every first Sunday after Easter, on the same date as in 1919, what has become the second largest Catholic procession of the Holy Land after the Palm Sunday procession in Jerusalem, takes place between downtown Haifa and Stella Maris, up the western slope of the Carmel. Large crowds of Catholic Christians, including those of eastern rites, are led by the Latin Patriarch and other Church leaders in accompanying the statue on its way.

== See also ==
- Oswald Rufeisen (1922–1998), Jewish convert to Christianity, Carmelite friar at Stella Maris, who was refused Israeli citizenship under the Law of Return

== Gallery ==
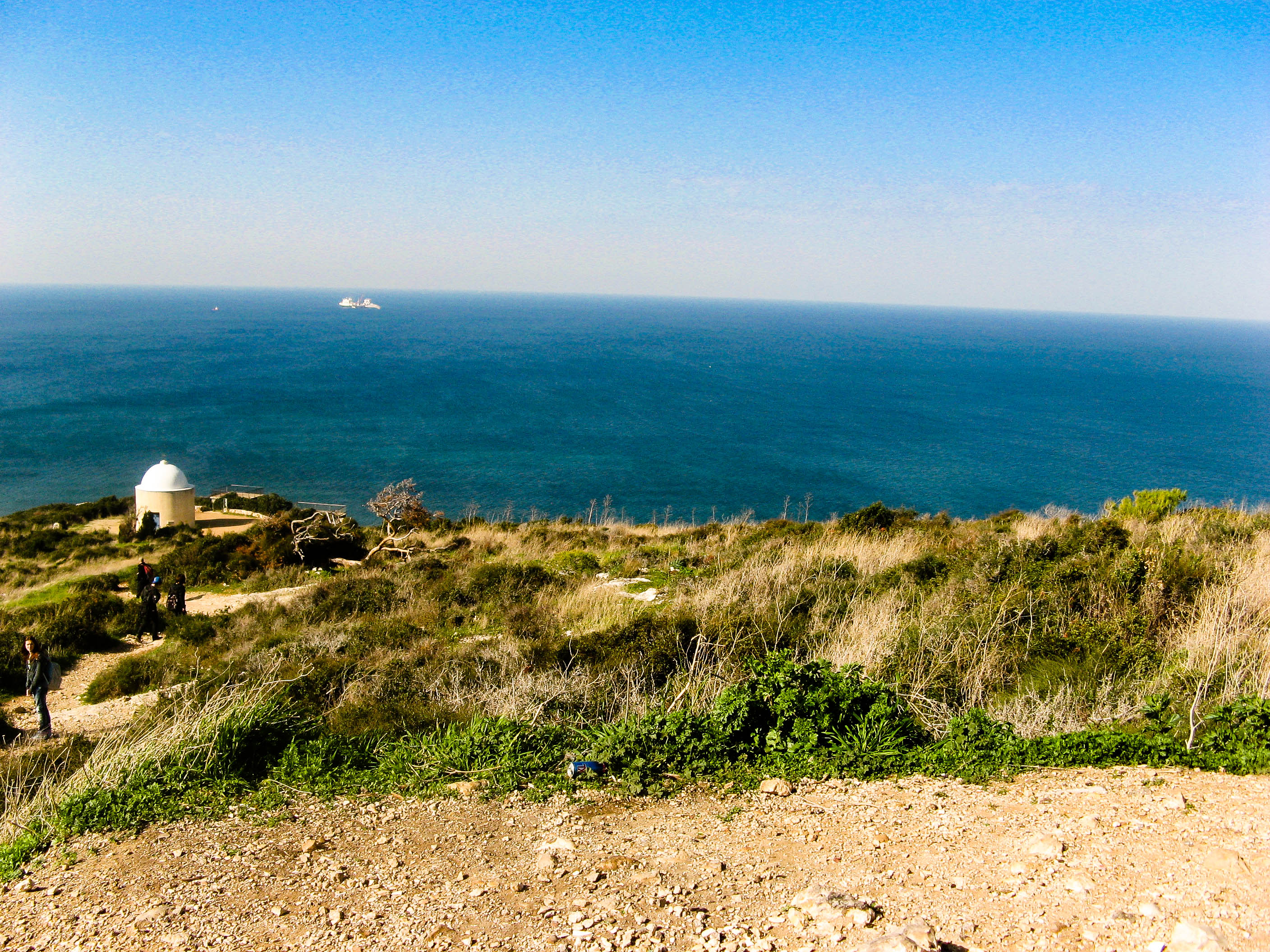
Sea view near the monastery

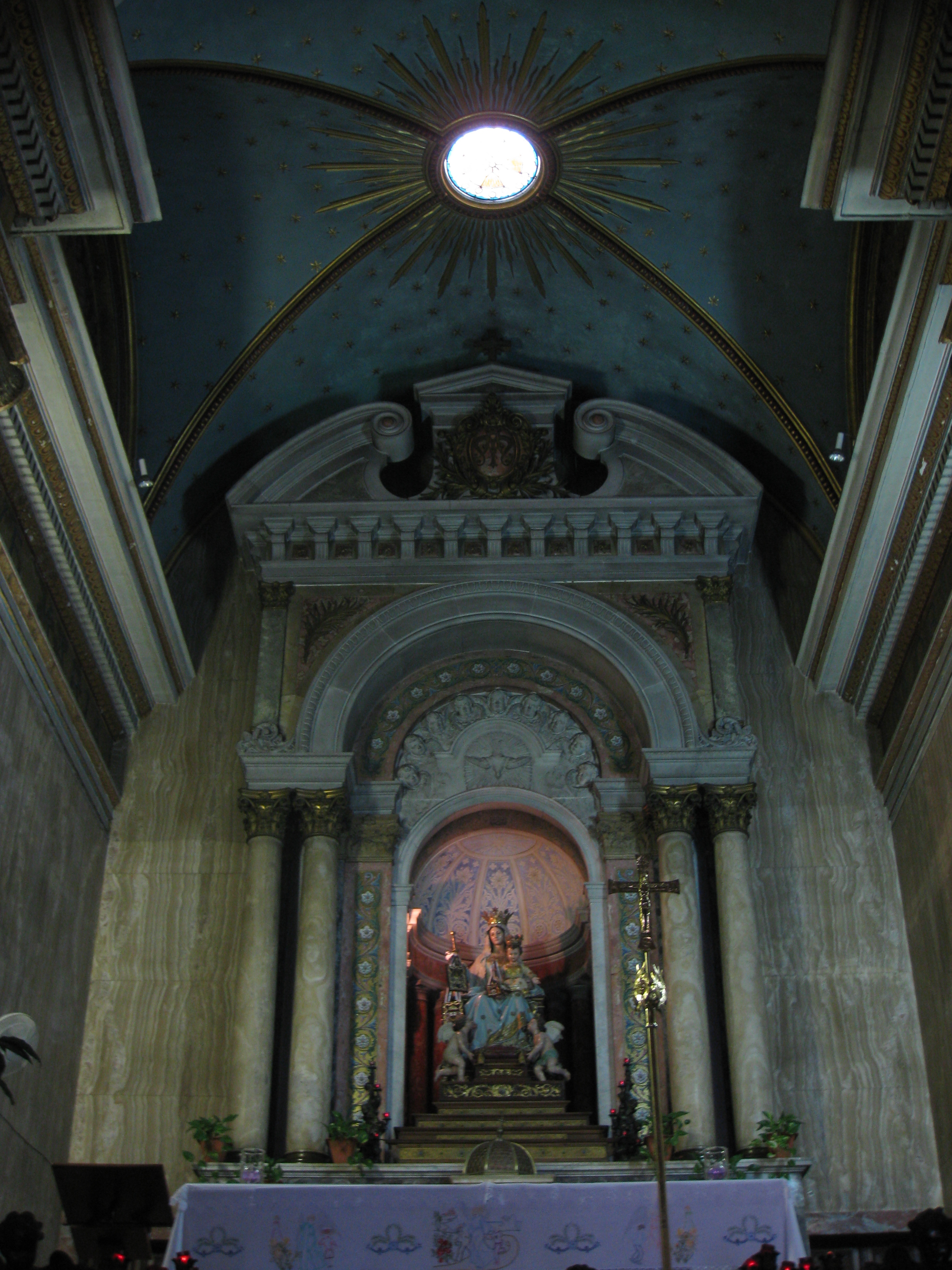
Church interior with high altar

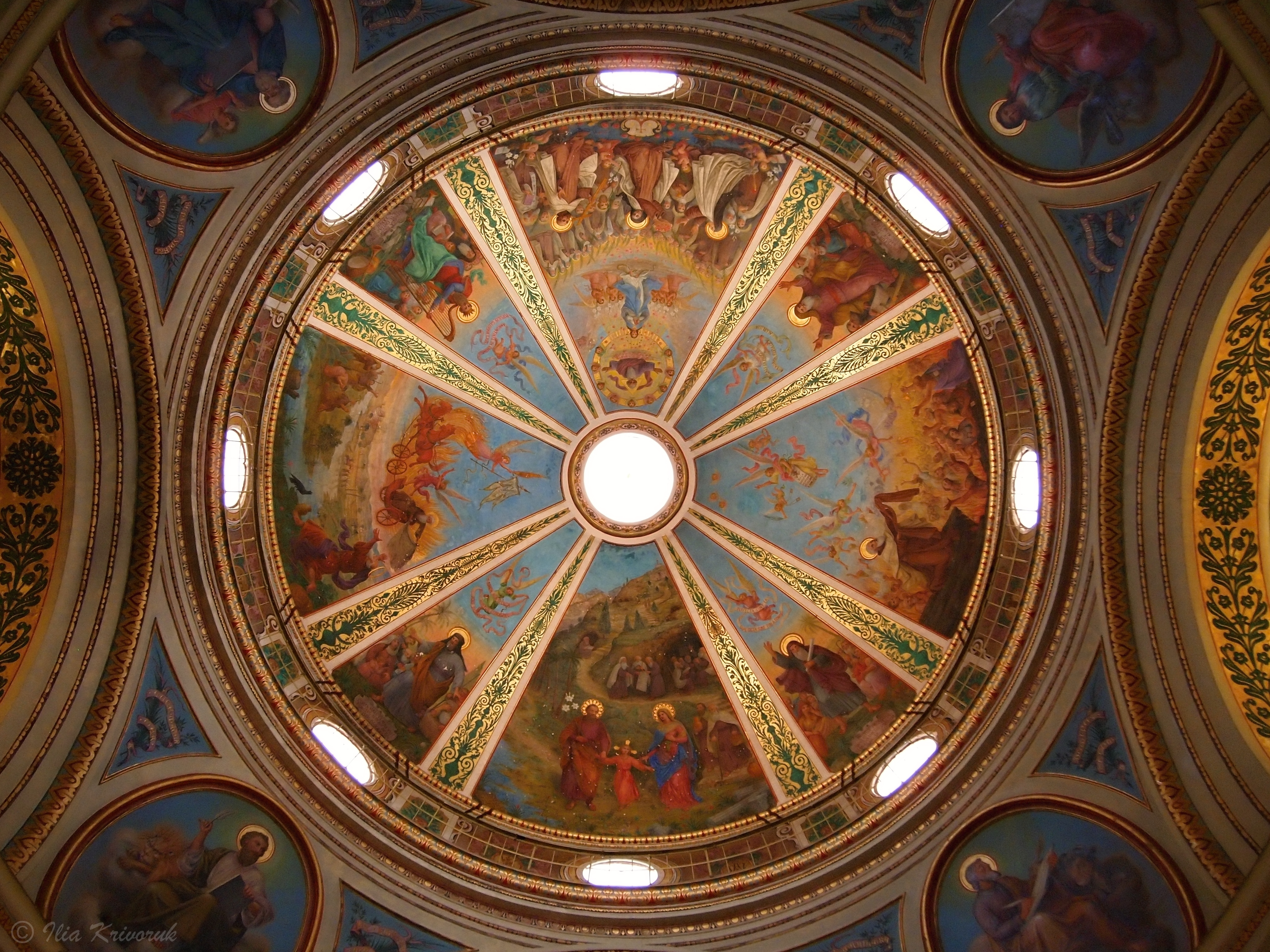
Stella Maris Church dome.

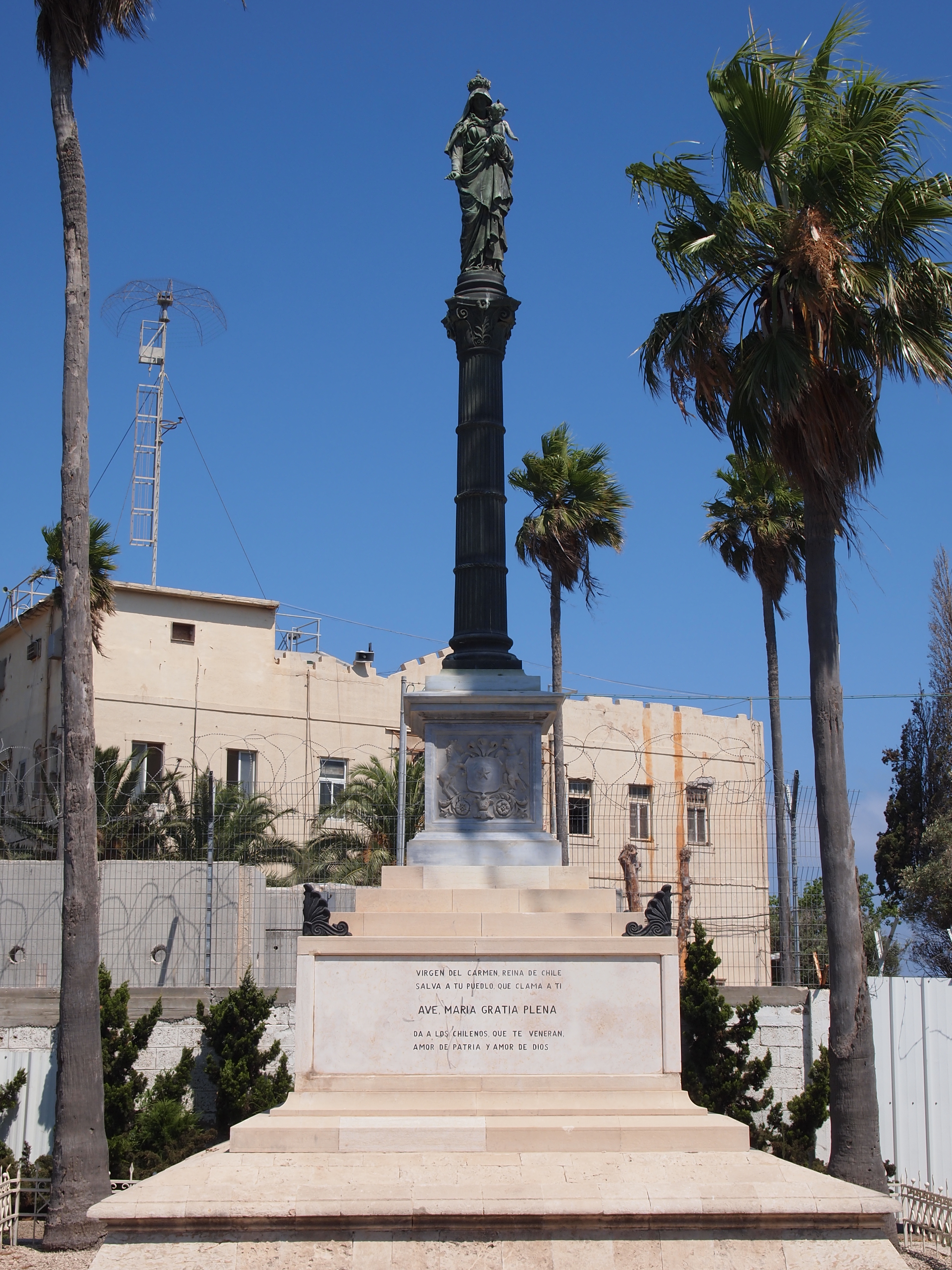
Stella Maris Madonna statue and lighthouse in a background

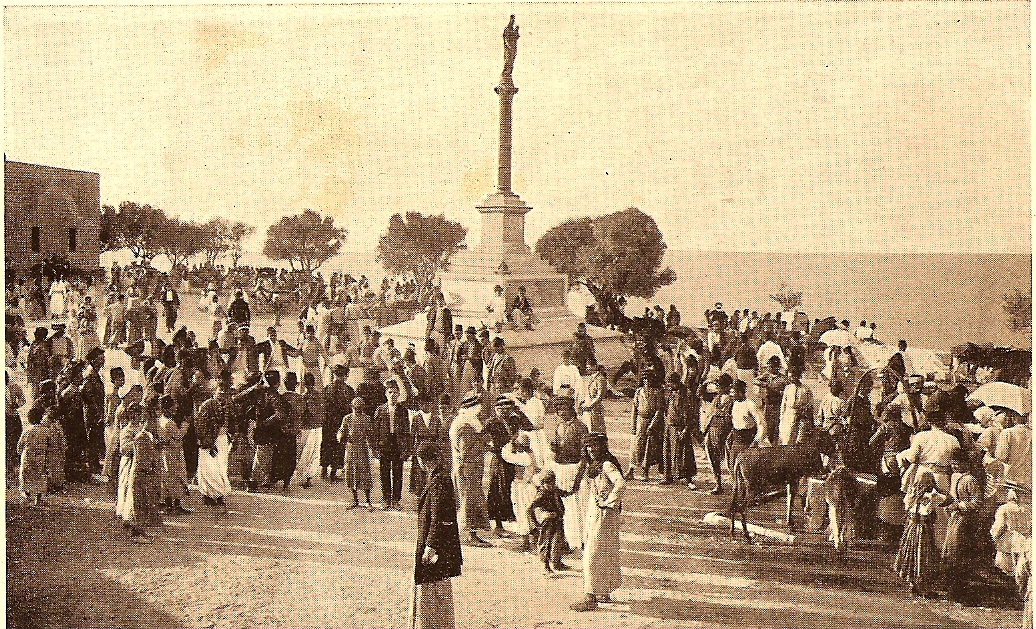
A pre-1948 celebration of the Feast of St. Elias, on 20 July, around Madonna statue

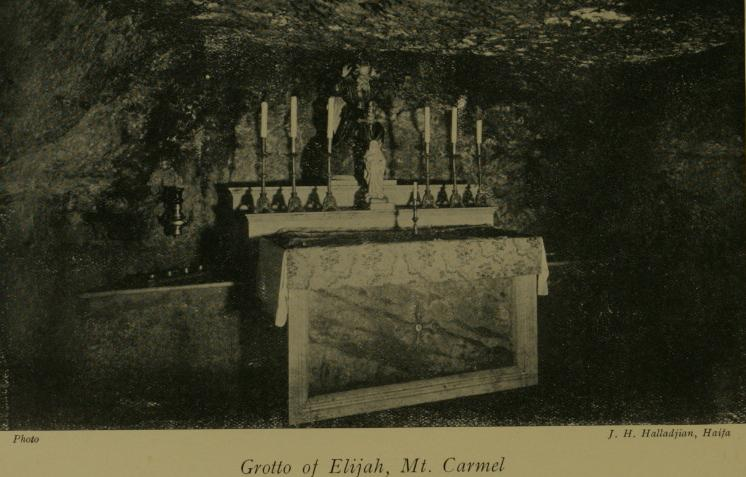
1913 postcard showing the altar inside the grotto of Elijah

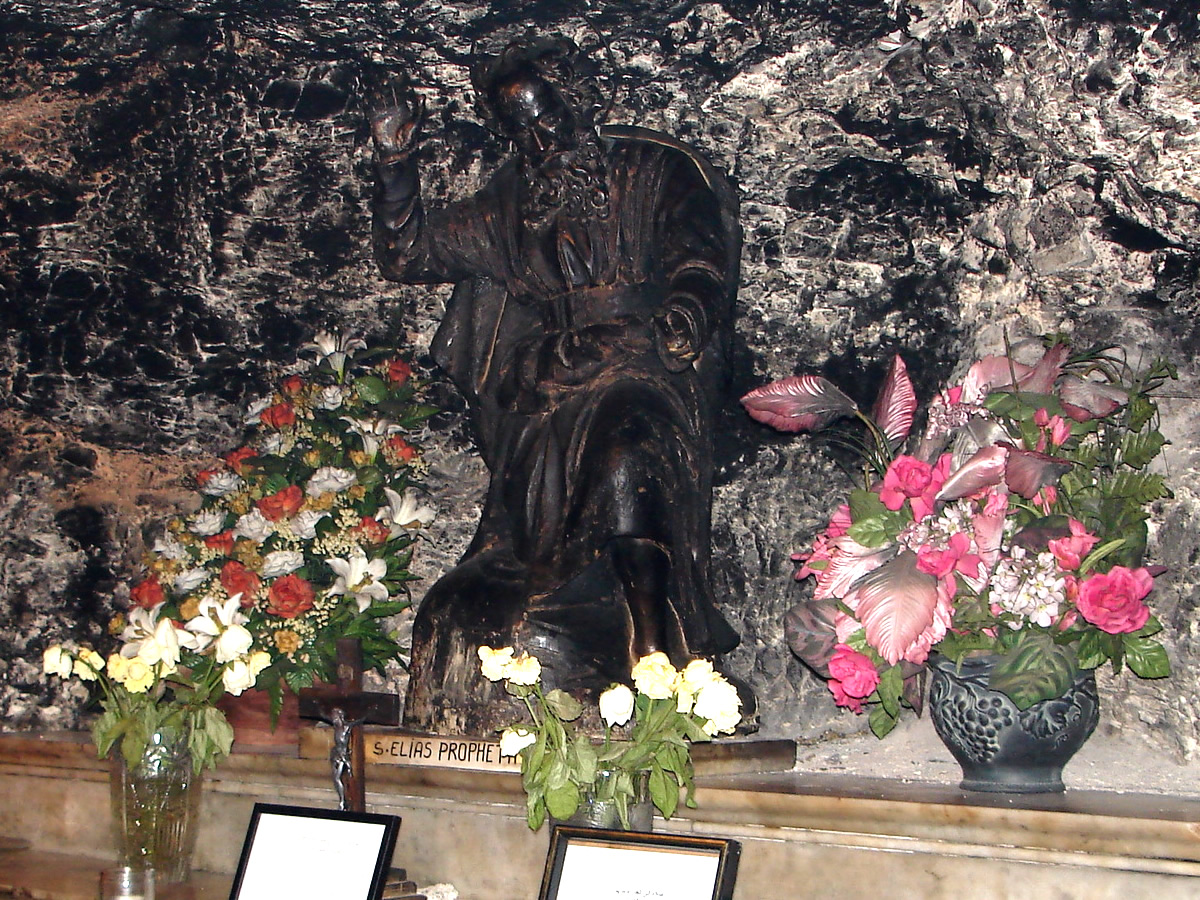
Statue of St Elias/Prophet Elijah on the altar of the cave inside the church

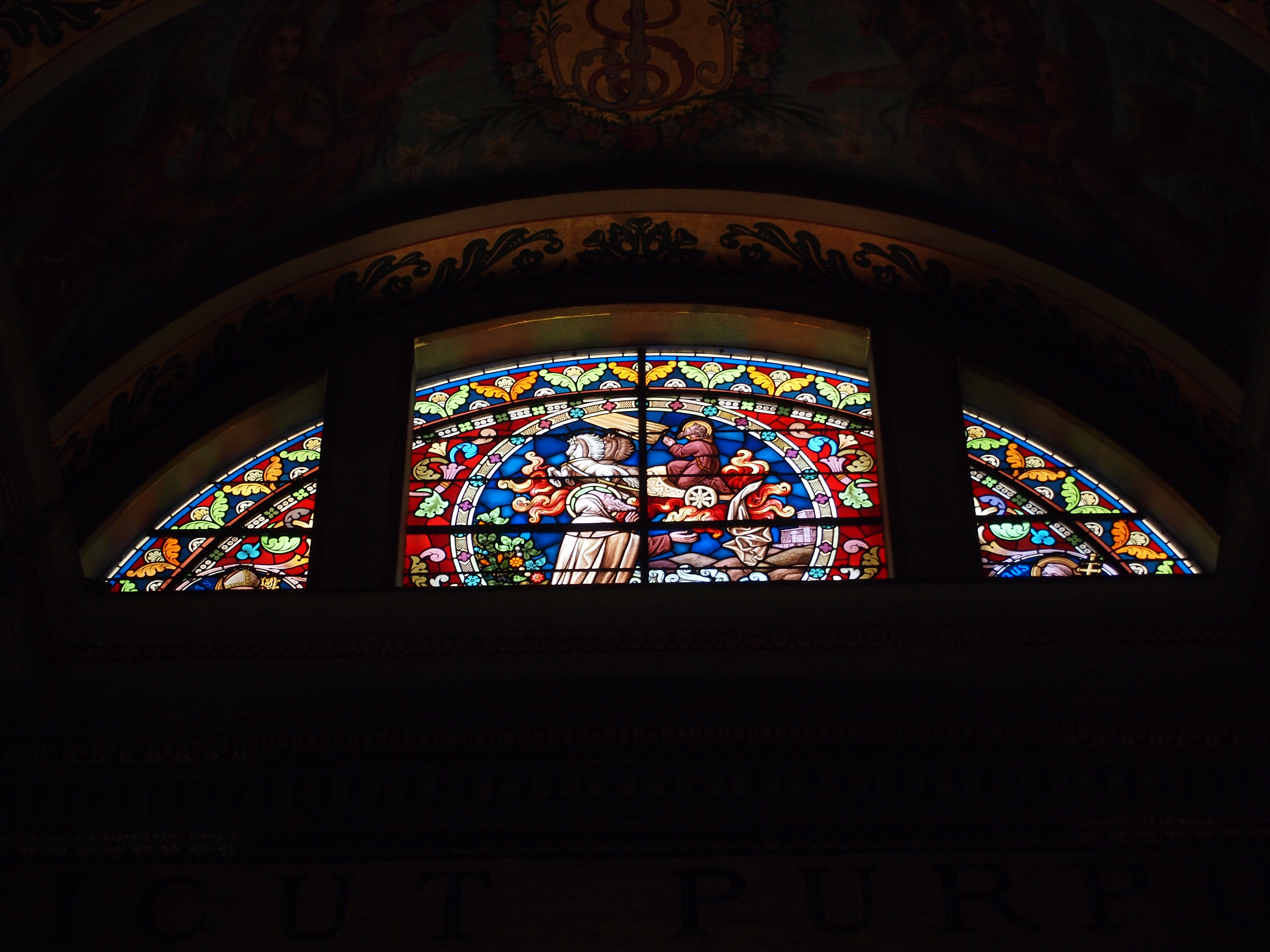
Stained glass window depicting prophet Elijah

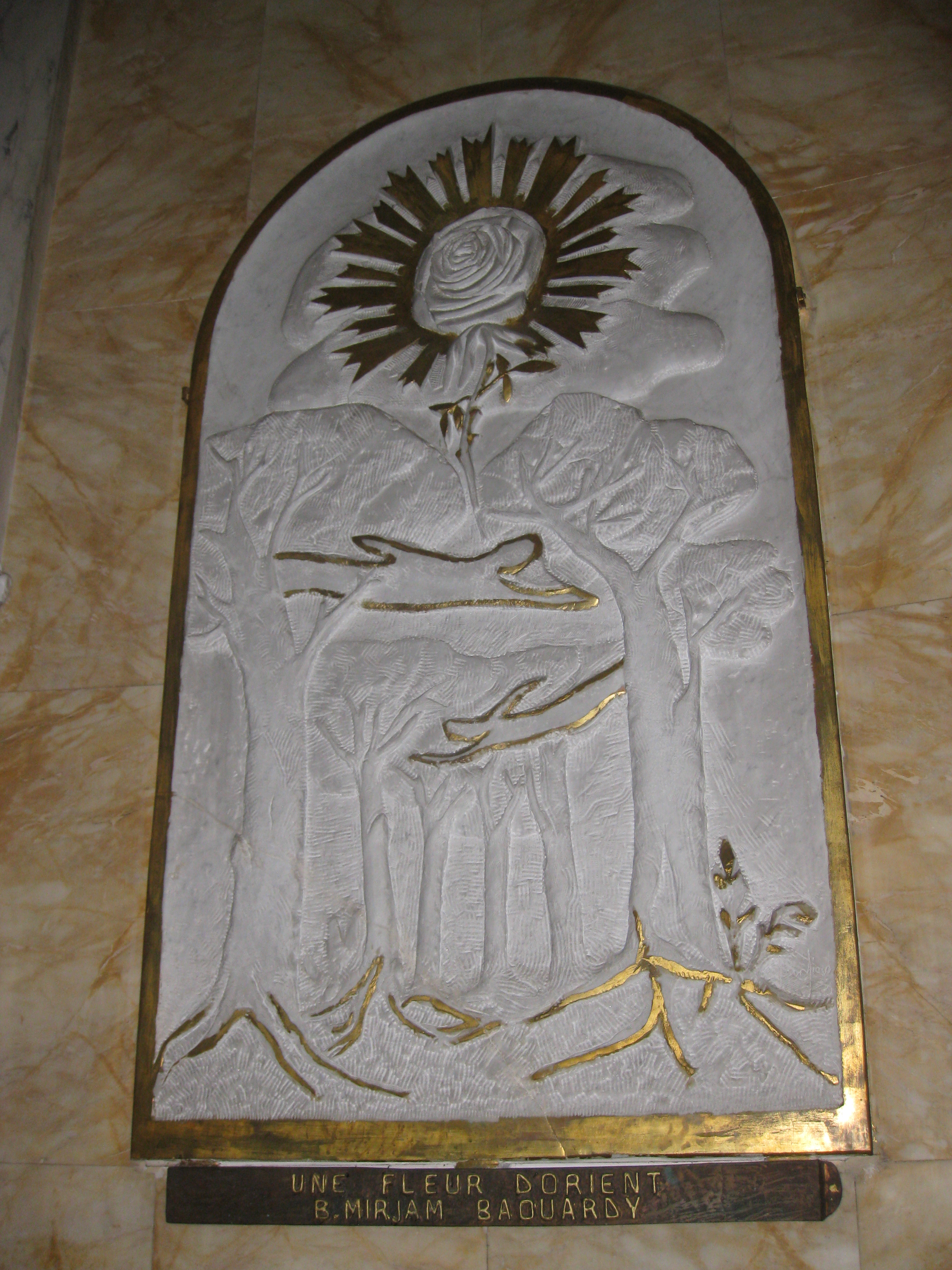
Panel inside the church to Mary of Jesus Crucified

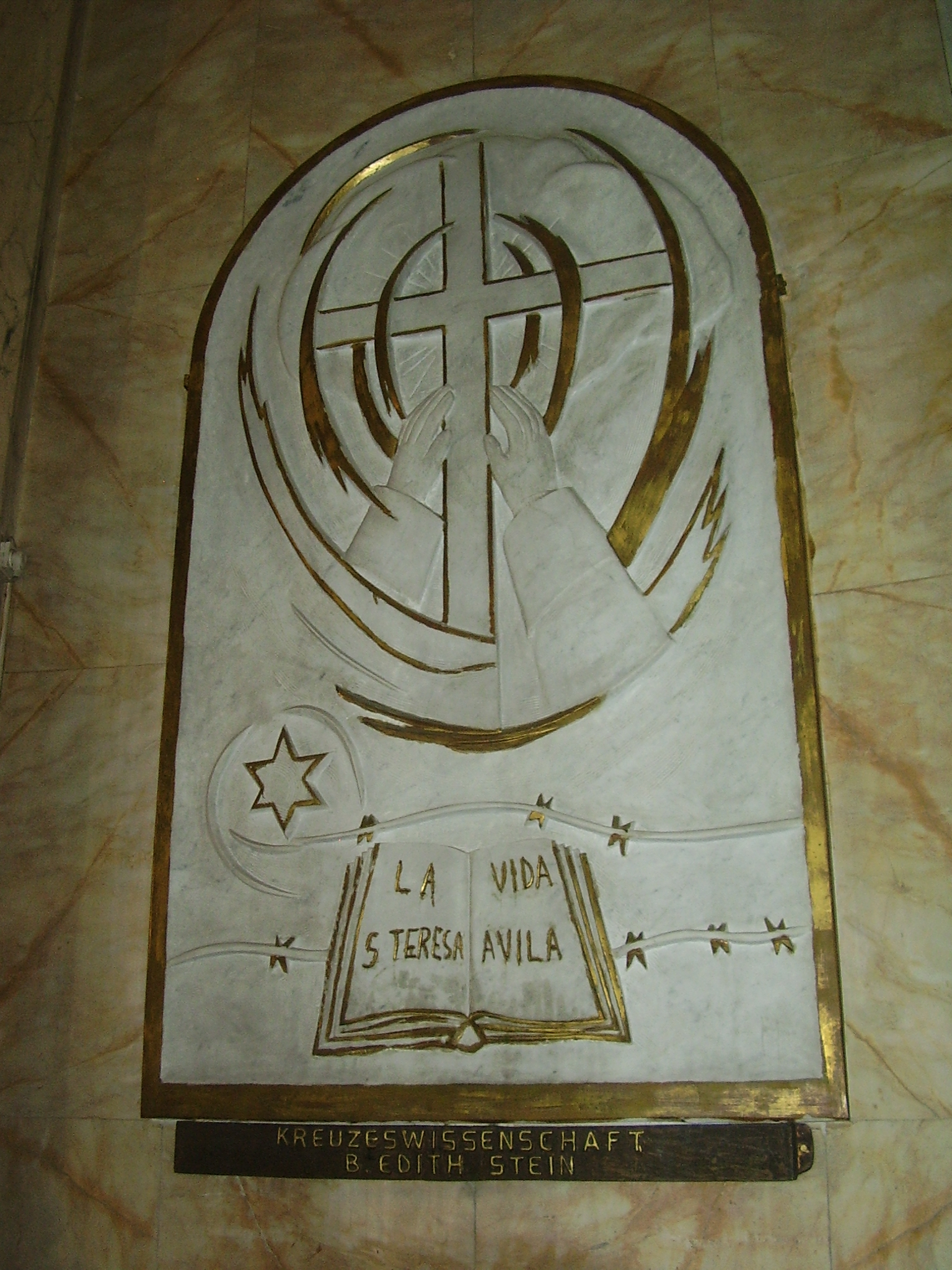
Panel to Teresa Benedicta of the Cross, The Science of the Cross

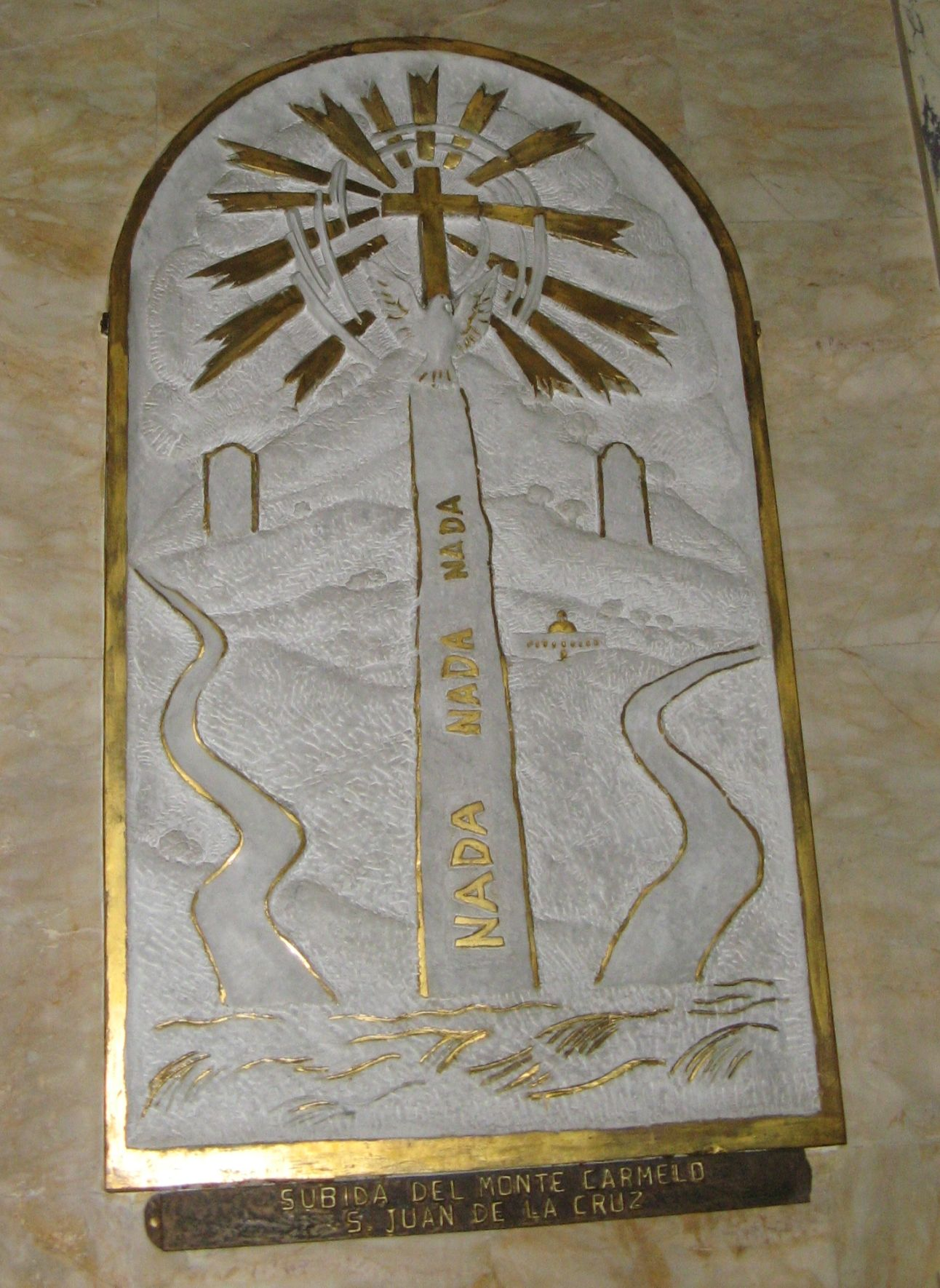
Panel to John of the Cross, The Ascent of Mount Carmel

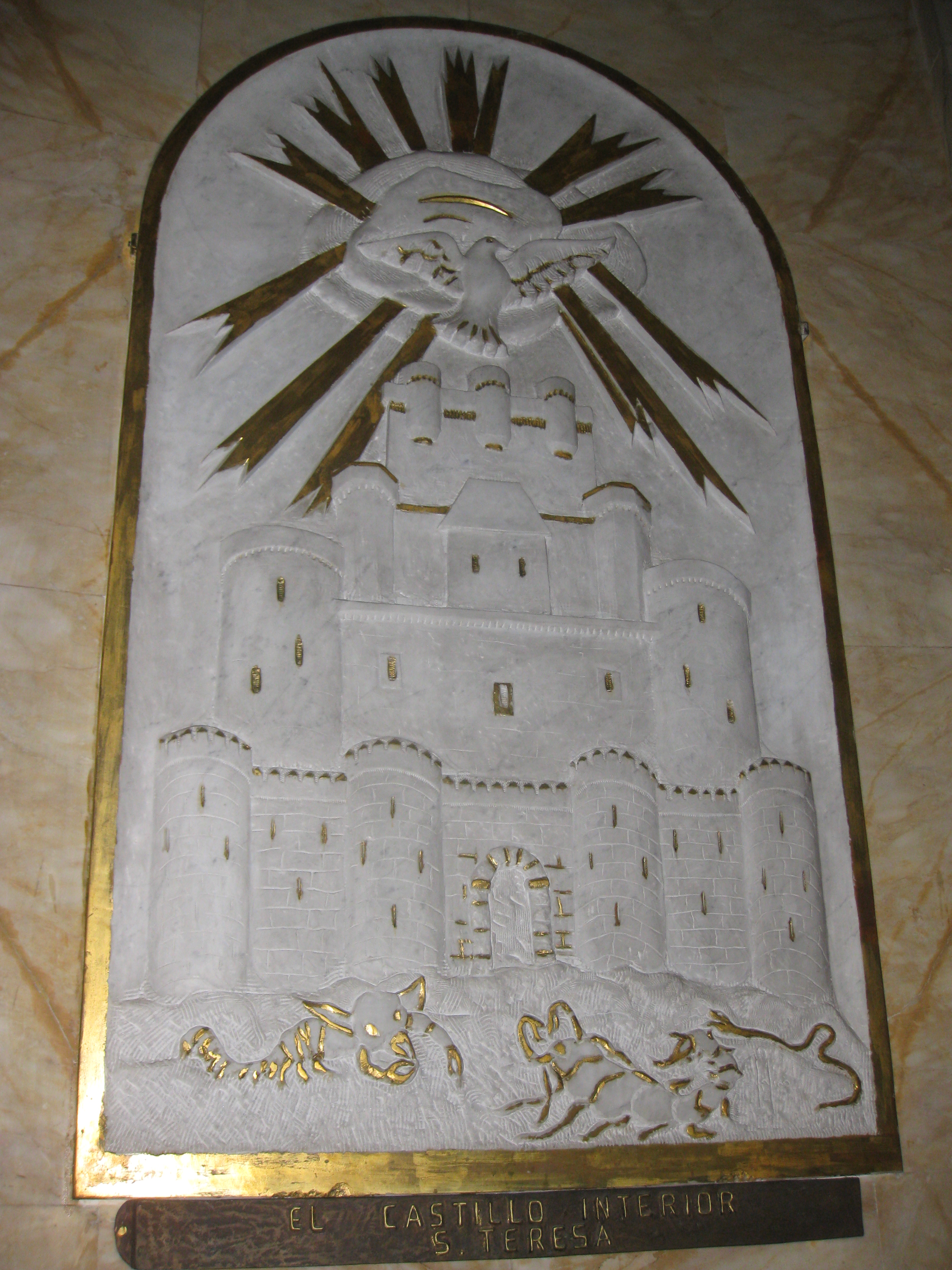
Panel to Teresa of Ávila, The Interior Castle
