= Mount Carmel Naval Base =

Mount Carmel Naval Logistics Base
- Israel
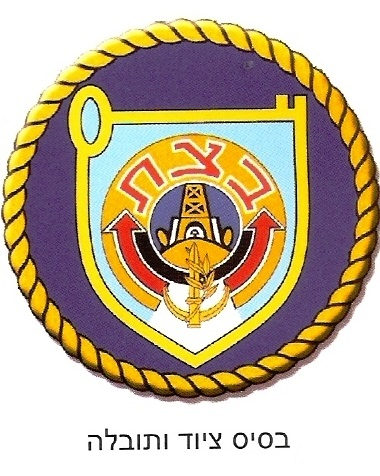
- Coat of Arms

Site information
- Type: Logistics Base
- Owner: Israel Defense Forces
- Operator: Israeli Navy

Garrison information
- Garrison: Israeli Navy: MFTAH Unit

Mount Carmel Naval Base, officially known as Betzet (formerly Yahsan), is the primary logistical base of the Israeli Navy, located near Mount Carmel in northern Israel. It is responsible for all logistics, equipment, and transportation operations of the Israeli Navy.

== Location ==
The base was originally located in the Kishon camp during the navy’s early years, and on 6 July 1999, its gradual relocation began to the "HaHotrim" Camp, south of Mount Carmel. HaHotrim also serves as the Haifa District headquarters of the Home Front Command.

== Role ==
It allows the navy to fight continuously without interruptions. The base is responsible for the procurement, maintenance and supply of equipment and materials, on an ongoing basis, and for its operational functions. It is also responsible for the material arrangements necessary for Shipbuilding. It also handles weaponry and ammunition accounting. An Engine workshop of the Israeli Naval Shipyards is also located on the base, where staff conducts ship repairs. It also garrisons the MFTAH Unit.

== Commanders ==
'"Base Commanders"
#	Rank and Name	Period of command	Note	Image
1	Major Akiva Pasternak	October 1949 - August 1951		
2	Major Israel Peled	August 1951 - August 1954		
3	Major David Eytan	August 1954 - September 1958		
4	Major Dan Adler	September 1958 - March 1961		
5	Major Israel Nesher	March 1961 - June 1964		
6	Major Adam Einav	June 1964 - November 1966		
7	Lt. Col. Yehuda Maimon	November 1966 - November 1971		
8	Lieutenant Colonel Chaim Shachak	December 1971 - September 1975		
9	Lieutenant Colonel Zvi Yaari	March 1975 - October 1976		
10	Colonel Yehuda Ashkenazi	October 1976 - July 1977		
11	Col. Ami Friedman	July 1977 - September 1979		
12	Colonel Yossi Paz	September 1979 - June 1981		
13	Col. Carmi Emanuel	June 1981 - April 1984	Systematization of the automatic warehouse literature	
14	Col. Avraham Ben Zeev	April 1984 - February 1987		
15	Col. Chanan Rosen	February 1987 - July 1990		
16	Colonel Israel Osevitsky	July 1990 - April 1992		
17	Col. Shlomo Eshed	April 1992 - April 1994		
18	Col. David Bachar	April 1994 - October 1995		
19	Col. Yossi Shemer (Shimilo)	October 1995 - July 1997		
20	Col. Amos Lehman	August 1997 - October 2000		
21	Col. Amnon Shamir	October 2000 - November 2003		
22	Col. Shy Davidi	November 2003 - March 2007		
23	Col. Amos Dei	March 2007 - September 2010		
24	Col. Yuval Giladi	September 2010 - July 2013		
25	Col. Eli Shuach	July 2013 - January 2015		
26	Col. Palti Shvarts	January 2015 - March 2017		
27	Col. Shimon Timsit	March 2017 - 2019		
28	Col. Lior Shahar	2019 - February 2021		
29	Col. Shoham Shuval	February 2021 - November 2022		
30	Col. A	February 2023 - Incumbent		

== Sources ==
- Meir Shapir, יחידת המחסנים, "Marine Systems" 95, August 1969, p. 25.
- Rami Antian, חנוכת בסיס ציוד ותובלה, "Between Waves" September 1976 p. 1
- Ila Dukes, נפתח מועדון חיילים בבצ"ת, 'Between Waves' June, 1978 p. 2.
- Shlomo Man, עצמה בזכות השירות, 'Between Waves' January 1981 p. 14.
- Sharon Harpaz, סדר בבלאגן - בצ"ת, "Between Waves" 169 December 1986, p. 32.
- Father Obel, רובוטריקים עוברים דירה - מחשוב ומישכון בבצ"ת, 'Between Waves' 177 April 1989 p. 31.
- Jordan Gur, פרויקט מעבר בצ"ת מתוכנן ל-11 ביוני 2013, "Between Waves" September 2013, p. 16.
- Sapphire, על אוטומט - מהפיכה טכנולוגיסטית בזרוע הים, "Between Waves", May 2017, p. 51.
