= MFTAH Unit =

- יחידת מפת"ח
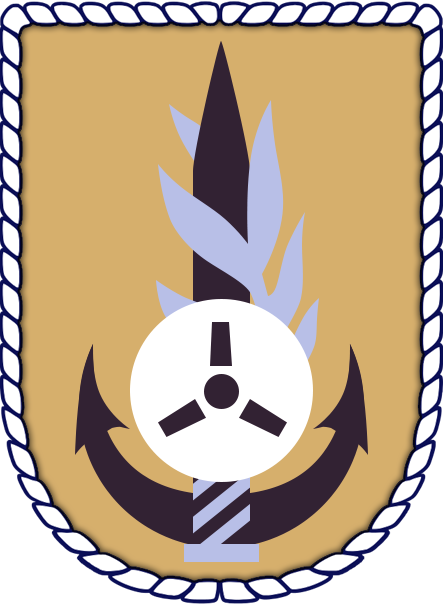
- Unit logo
- Active: 1960s – present (modern form since 2019)
- Country: Israel
- Branch: Israeli Navy; Mamram
- Type: Research and Development unit
- Role: See #Roles
- Part of: Israeli Navy
- Garrison/HQ: Mount Carmel Naval Base
- Nickname(s): Naval Research Unit

Commanders
- Current commander: Col. S
- Notable commanders: See #Commanders

The MFTAH unit is the technological research and development unit of the Israeli Navy. It is the central unit responsible for research, development, implementation and integration of software systems in various units and naval based on the Israeli Navy. The identity of the unit's active personnel is heavily classified.

== Roles ==
The main role of the unit is the research and development of various systems for equipment to be used on submarines, anti-tank weaponry, helicopters and planes of the Israeli Navy as well as arms development for small-scale warfare. The fields which are researched by the unit include:

- Operational combat systems: Coordination and control, operational communication and electronic warfare systems.
- Simulation systems: For BHD 600.
- Information gathering systems: for Intelligence gathering, security, logistics, procurement and finance purposes.

Its personnel have deployed surveillance and data monitoring instrumentations on all the ships of the Israeli Navy by separately managing the data monitoring and storage, for this purpose the unit has spent millions of shekels.

== Structure ==
The unit has independent development teams and industry development teams engaged in software development in projects at the forefront of technology.

The unit consists of seven branches:

- Software Development Branch
- Cyber Branch
- Information Systems Branch
- Digital Branch
- Integration Branch
- Co-operation Branch
- Feedback Branch

The software and integration branches are made up of graduates of Computer Engineering / software engineering / Information Engineering and are also graduates of a programming course at the BHD 600. Their main role is the research of advanced technologies, coding, software design, and the integration of the software in the operational system. The role of the cyber branch is Cyber Security. For field testing, the unit utilises Naval vessels of other units mostly Shayetet 3 and Shayetet 7 vessels.

The main base of the unit is Mount Carmel Naval Base but there's also a second base in the Maklef camp in Ramat Gan.

== History ==
The unit was established in the 1960s as one of the units of the Mamram, and was first called the "Navy Computer Unit". Later it was renamed to MAMHI. In 1999, MAMHI was split into two software units: the Takshov center, and MATAM. With the split of the units, Col. Natan Barak, who was the commander of MAMHI, became the commander of MATAM. The first of 2012. The two units were merged in 2019 and the unit name changed to MFTAH and Lt. Col. Moshe Kanzin, who was the commander of MATAM, was promoted to the rank of colonel and became the commander of MFTAH. The unit invested heavily on VR systems and high quality IT gadgets integrating devices from Oracle and Microsoft. The logo of the unit remained the same throughout. In 2022, the unit was awarded the Chief of Staff's award for outstanding units by Lt. Col. Aviv Kochavi. In 2023, the unit won the Israel Security Award.

== Commanders ==
- Col. Jacob Noy
- Col. Baruch Elon
- Col. Shlomo Markel
- Col. Yaron Tzur
- Col. Natan Barak
- Col. Oded Fisher
- Col. Gil Ben Ami
- Col. Moshe Kanzin
- Col. S. (Name redacted)

== Sources & References ==
- יחידת מפת"ח, on Israeli Navy website
- Raviv Hadar, סקירת יחידות - ממת"מ הסיירת הטכנולוגית, "Between Waves", October 2014, p. 65.
- Yossi the Tony, חיל הים מרענן את תשתיות ה-IT שלו במיליוני שקלים, on the website "People and Computers", July 21, 2016
- Birit Almog, מהפכת הכלים הבלתי מאוישים קרובה מתמיד, on the "Israeli Navy website", December 16, 2016
- Ami Rokhax Dumba, חיל הים 2.0 - הדור הבא, on the website "Israel Defense", October 6, 2016
- Yossi Tony, חיל הים מציג: דטה סנטר לכל ספינה, on the "People and Computers website", August 31, 2015
- Yossi Tony, חיל הים יעלה מערכות שו"ב חדשות על ספינותיו בפרויקט מחשוב שאפתני בהיקף מיליוני שקלים, on the "People and Computers" website, October 20, 2009
