= Sacred Heart Chapel, Haifa =

Sacred Heart Chapel
- מעון הלב הקדוש
- مؤسسة قلب يسوع
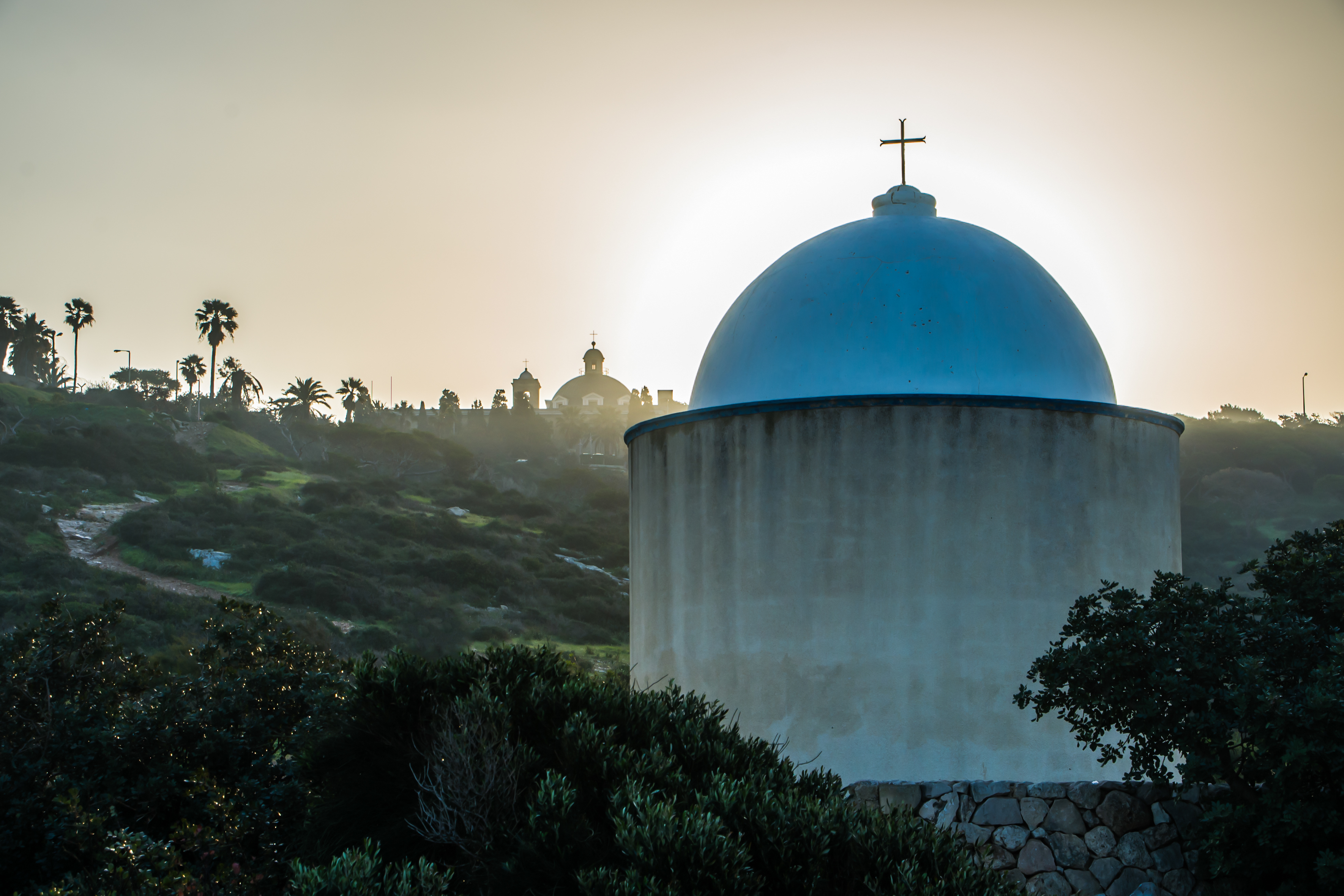
- Sacred Heart Chapel
- 32.8285°N 34.96646°E
- Location: Haifa
- Country: Israel
- Denomination: Roman Catholic Church

The Sacred Heart Chapel (Arabic: مؤسسة قلب يسوع, Hebrew: מעון הלב הקדוש Latin: Capella Sacratissimi Cordis) is a religious building that is affiliated with the Catholic Church and is located on Mount Carmel in Haifa, northern Israel.

Is notable for its unique design and started as a windmill with a privileged location overlooking the Mediterranean Sea and the city of Haifa. The church has small white dome dating back to the nineteenth century. The temple is closed to visitors and is reserved exclusively for the Catholic inhabitants of the monastery, who use it for prayer and contemplation.

== See also ==
- Roman Catholicism in Israel
- Latin Patriarchate of Jerusalem

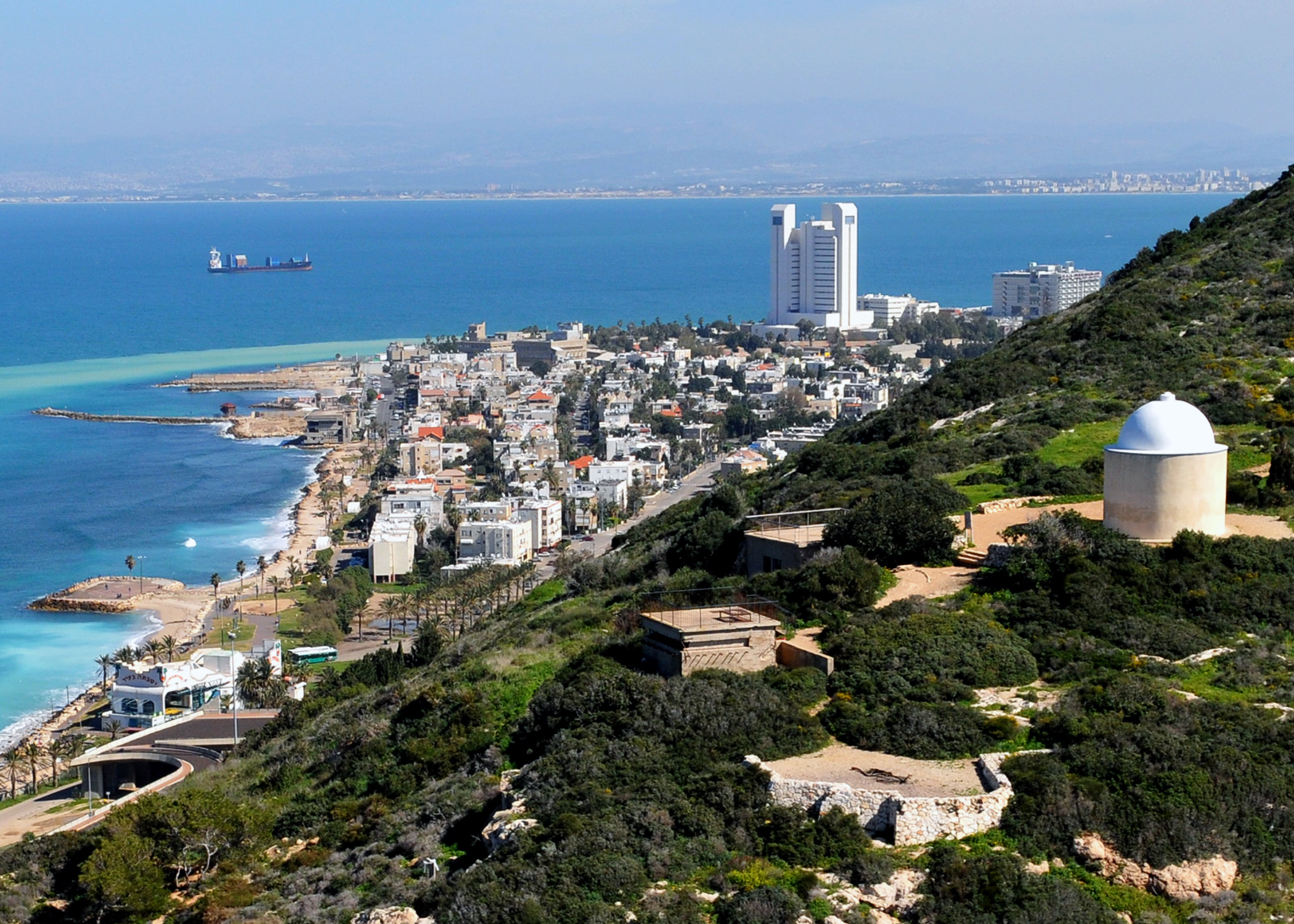
The Chapel and Haifa Bay
