= Mount Carmel =

Coastal mountain range in Israel and portions thereof

- הר הכרמל (Hebrew) جبل الكرمل / جبل مار إلياس (Arabic)
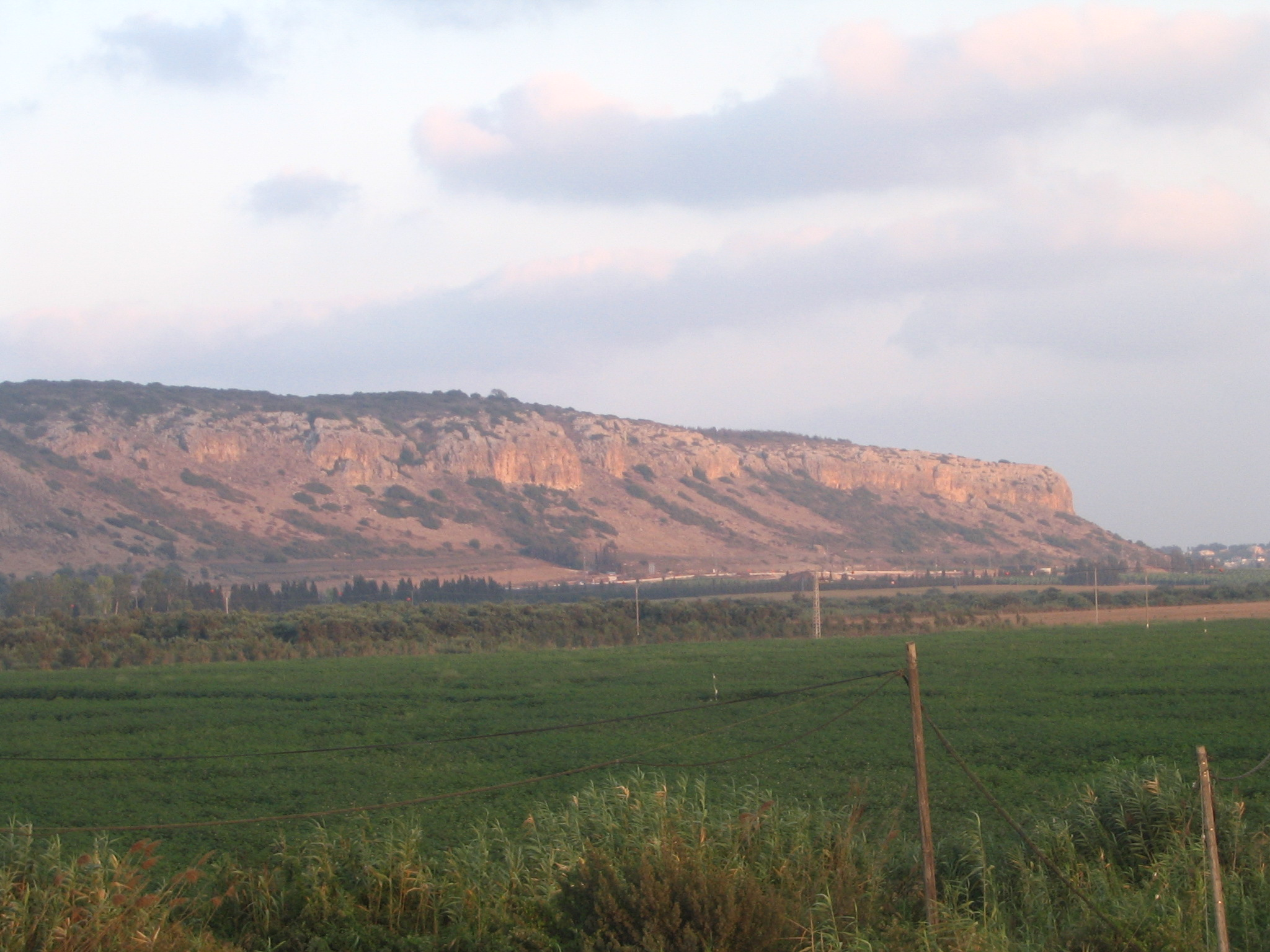
- The southern tip of Mount Carmel at sunset, as seen from the entrance to Kibbutz Ma'agan Michael

Highest point
- Elevation: 525.4 m (1,724 ft)

Dimensions
- Length: 39 km (24 mi)
- Width: 8 km (5.0 mi)

Geography
- Location within Haifa region of Israel
- Country: Israel
- District: Haifa
- Range coordinates: 32°44′N 35°03′E

Geology
- Rock type(s): Limestone and flint

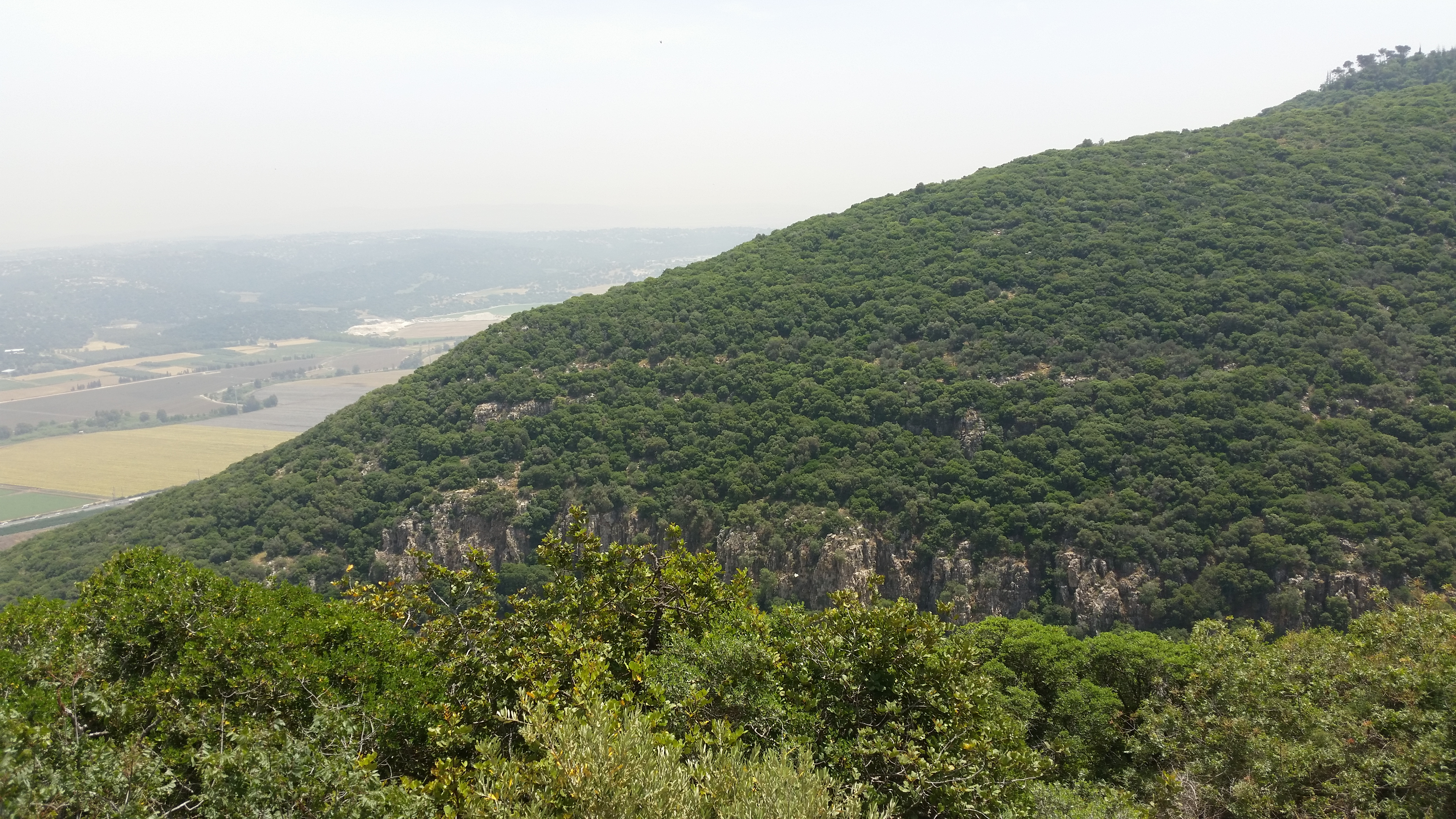
A view of Mount Carmel

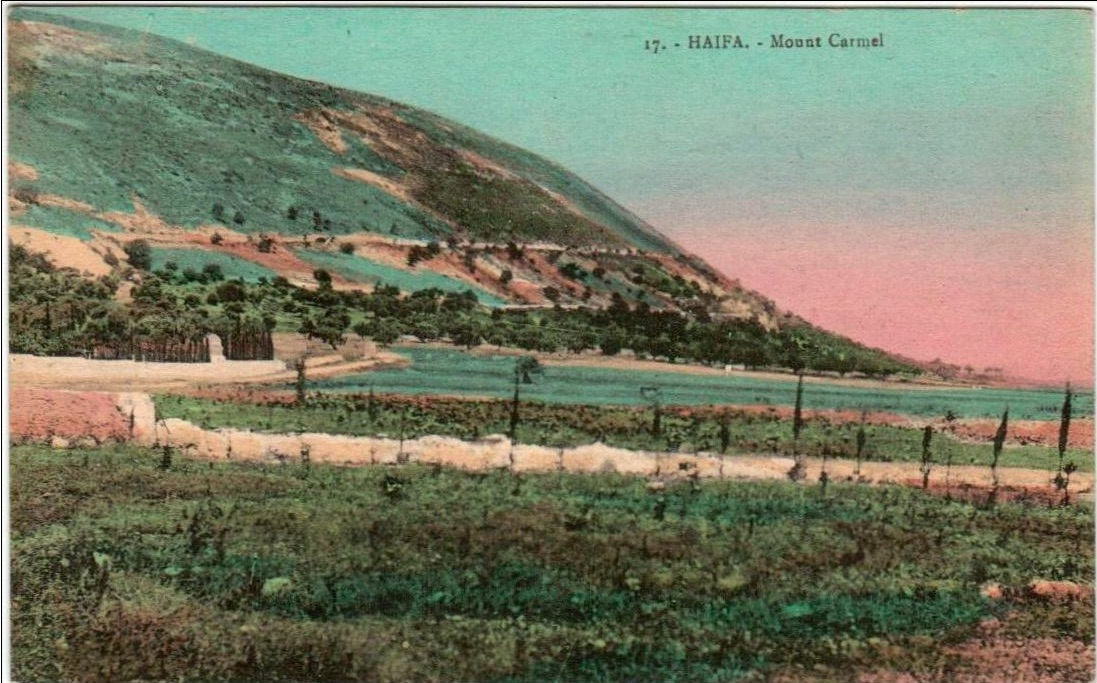
Coloured postcard of "Haifa, Mount Carmel", by Karimeh Abbud, c. 1925

Mount Carmel (Hebrew: הַר הַכַּרְמֶל, romanized: Har haKarmel; Arabic: جبل الكرمل, romanized: Jabal al-Karmil), also known in Arabic as Mount Mar Elias (Arabic: جبل مار إلياس, romanized: Jabal Mār Ilyās, lit. 'Mount Saint Elias/Elijah'; Hebrew: הַר הַקָּדוֹשׁ אֵלִיָּהוּ, romanized: Har haQadosh Eliyahu), is a coastal mountain range in northern Israel stretching from the Mediterranean Sea towards the southeast. The range is a UNESCO biosphere reserve. A number of towns are situated there, most notably Haifa, Israel's third largest city, located on the northern and western slopes.

== Etymology ==
The word karmel ("garden-land") has been explained as a compound of kerem and el meaning "vineyard of God" or a clipping of kar male, meaning "full kernel". Martin Jan Mulder suggested a third etymology, that of kerem + l with a lamed sufformative, meaning only "vineyard", but this is considered unlikely as evidence for the existence of a lamed sufformative is weak.

In Song of Songs 7:6, karmel is generally interpreted as a color, perhaps "crimson" or "yellow". Isachar Tamar suggests connecting it to the yellow "karmel lily" mentioned by the Jerusalem Talmud (y. Sukkah 3:6 ) in the version of REbYH.

== Geography and geology ==
The phrase "Mount Carmel" has been used in three distinct ways, referring to either one of the following three areas:

- The 39 km (24 mi) long mountain range all the way to Jenin, including the Manasseh Hill Country and the heights southeast of it.
- The northwestern 19 km (12 mi) of the mountain range.
- The headland at the northwestern end of the range.

The Carmel range is approximately 6.5 to 8 kilometres (4.0 to 5.0 miles) wide, sloping gradually towards the southwest, but forming a steep ridge on the northeastern face, 546 metres (1,791 feet) high. The Jezreel Valley lies to the immediate northeast. The range forms a natural barrier in the landscape, just as the Jezreel Valley forms a natural passageway, and consequently the mountain range and the valley have had a large impact on migration and invasions through the Levant over time.

The mountain formation is an admixture of limestone and flint, containing many caves, and covered in several volcanic rocks. While most of the sedimentary rock originates in the late Cretaceous, some of the north east sediments are from the early Cretaceous, and the edges also feature sediments from the Pleistocene.

The sloped side of the mountain is covered with luxuriant vegetation, including oak, pine, olive, and laurel trees.

Several modern towns are located on the range, including Yokneam on the eastern ridge; Zikhron Ya'akov on the southern slope; the Druze communities of Daliyat al-Karmel and Isfiya on the more central part of the ridge; and the towns of Nesher, Tirat Hakarmel, and the city of Haifa, on the far northwestern promontory and its base. There is also a small kibbutz called Beit Oren, which is located on one of the highest points in the range to the southeast of Haifa. Mount Carmel Naval Base is also located just near the mountain and is the logistical hub of Israeli Navy.

== History ==
=== Palaeolithic and Epipalaeolithic ===
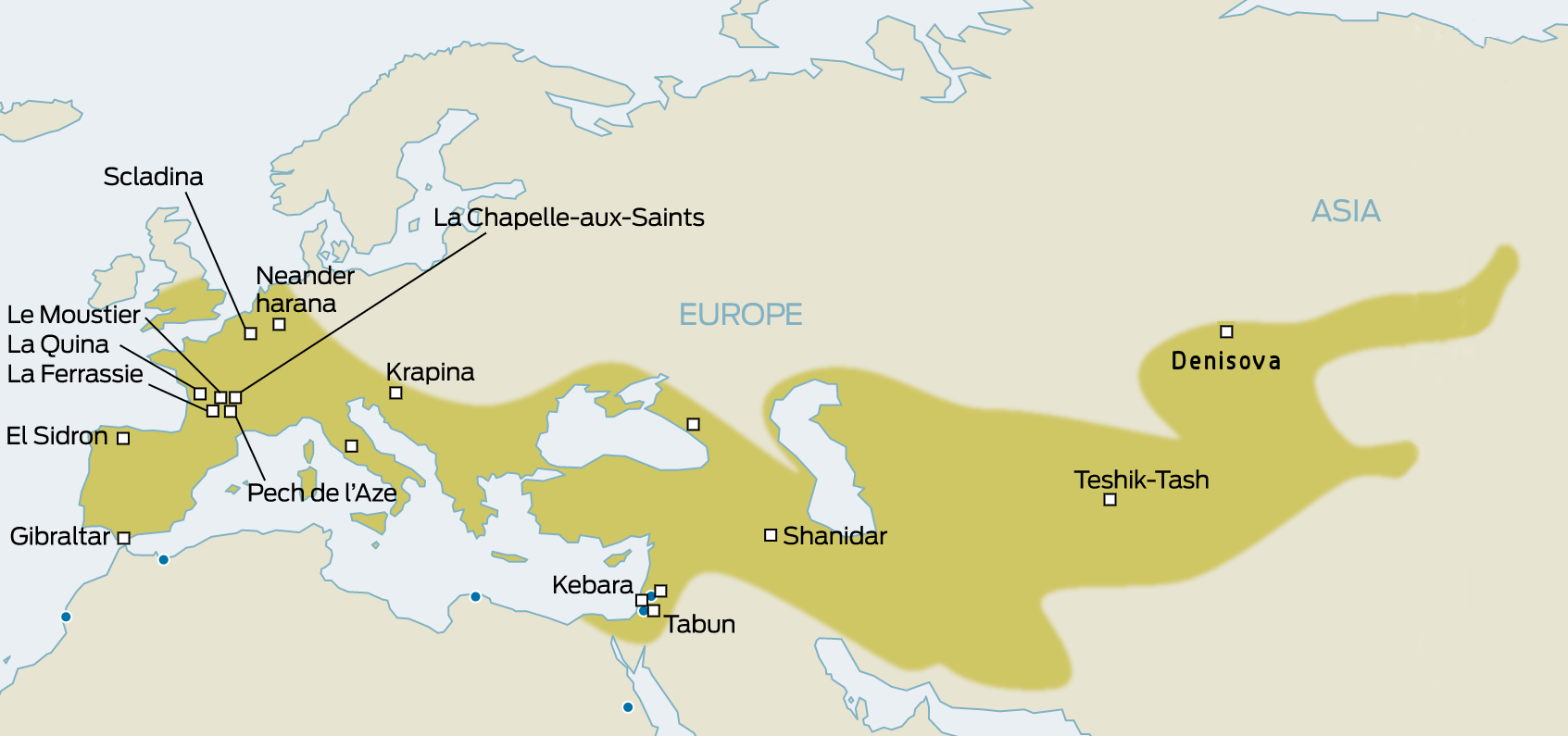
Distribution of the Neanderthal, and main sites, including Tabun cave, 500,000 to around 40,000 BP

As part of a 1929–1934 campaign, between 1930 and 1932, Dorothy Garrod excavated four caves, and a number of rock shelters, in the Carmel mountain range at el-Wad, el-Tabun, and Es Skhul. Garrod discovered Neanderthal and early modern human remains, including the skeleton of a Neanderthal female, named Tabun I, which is regarded as one of the most important human fossils ever found. The excavation at el-Tabun produced the longest stratigraphic record in the region, spanning 600,000 or more years of human activity.

The four caves and rock-shelters, Tabun, Jamal, el-Wad, and Skhul, together yield results from the Lower Paleolithic to the present day, representing roughly a million years of human evolution. There are also several well-preserved burials of Neanderthals and Homo sapiens and the transition from nomadic hunter-gatherer groups to complex, sedentary agricultural societies is extensively documented at the site. Taken together, these emphasize the paramount significance of the Mount Carmel caves for the study of human cultural and biological evolution within the framework of palaeo-ecological changes."

In 2012, UNESCO's World Heritage Committee added the sites of human evolution at Mount Carmel to the List of World Heritage Sites. The World Heritage Site includes four caves (Tabun, Jamal, el-Wad, and Skhul) on the southern side of the Nahal Me'arot/Wadi El-Mughara Valley. The site fulfils criteria in two separate categories, "natural" and "cultural".

Of great interest for the Near East Epipalaeolithic is Kebara Cave.

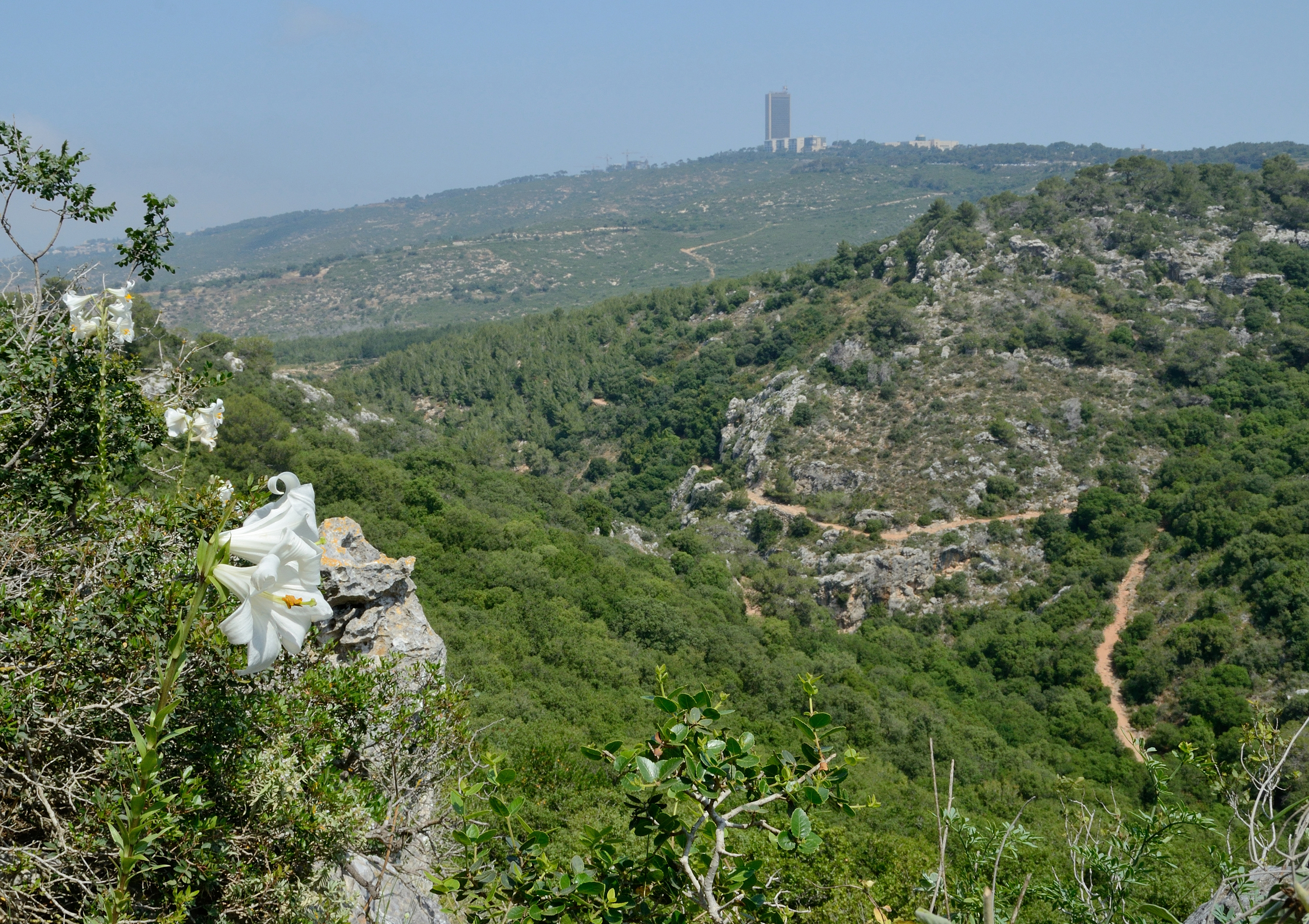
The University of Haifa atop Mount Carmel

In December 2020, archaeologists from the University of Haifa announced the discovery of the oldest known tool used for grinding or scraping, dating back about 350,000 years at the Tabun Cave at Mount Carmel site. According to researchers, this cobble belongs to the Acheulo-Yabrudian complex from the late Lower Paleolithic and was used by hominids for abrading surfaces.

=== Classical and late antiquity ===
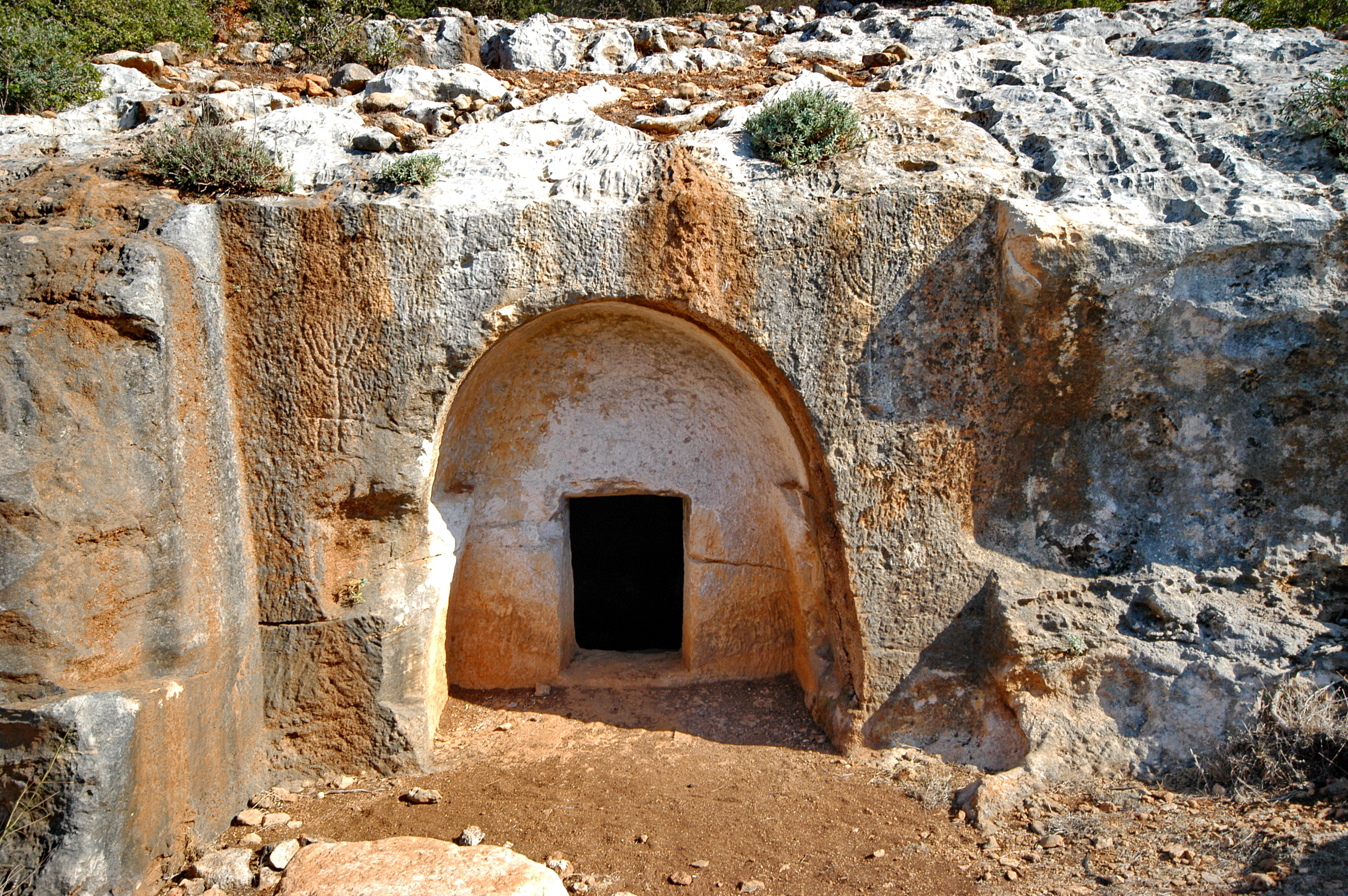
Jewish rock-cut tomb with menorah carvings from the Roman period at Horvat Sumaqa

During the Roman and Byzantine periods, a belt of Jewish villages flourished across Mount Carmel, supported by highland agriculture and local industry. Towns such as Horvat Sumaqa, with its monumental 3rd–4th century CE synagogue, exemplify this pattern of Jewish settlement, linking the Jewish-majority Galilee with the surrounding valleys. In the 5th century this network was disrupted by unrest, likely including the Samaritan revolts, when Byzantine reprisals did not always distinguish between Samaritan and Jewish communities, affecting places such as Husifah (modern Isfiya) and Horvat Sumaqa.

=== Ancient agriculture: olive oil and wine ===
Archaeologists have discovered ancient wine and oil presses at various locations on Mount Carmel.

=== As a strategic location ===
==== Hebrew Bible ====
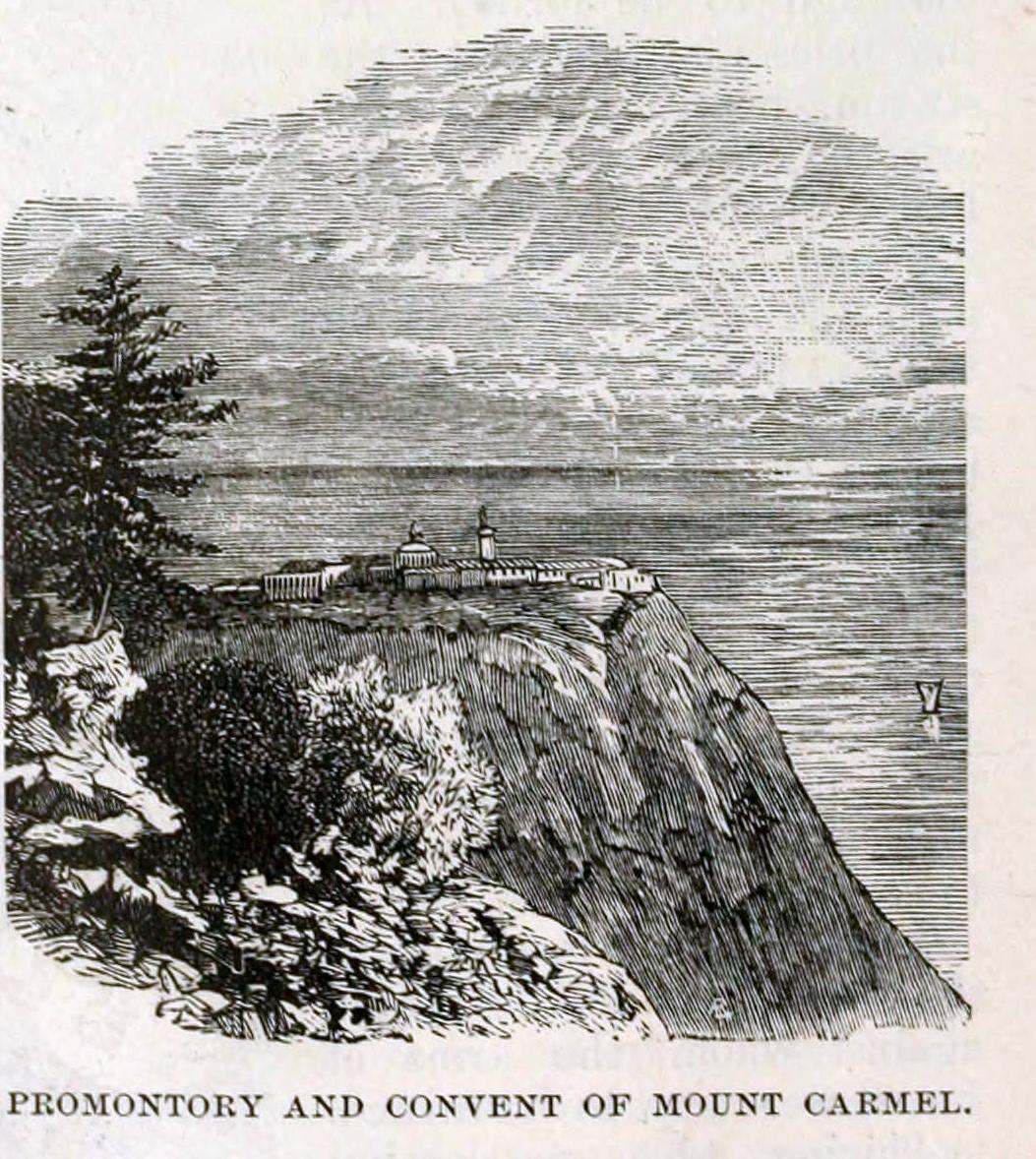
Promontory and convent of Mount Carmel

Due to the lush vegetation on the sloped hillside, and many caves on the steeper side, Carmel became the haunt of criminals. Thickly-wooded Carmel was seen as a hiding place, as implied by the Book of Amos. According to the Books of Kings, Elisha travelled to Carmel straight after cursing a group of young men because they had mocked him and the ascension of Elijah by jeering, "Go on up, bald man!" After this, bears came out of the forest and mauled 42 of them. This does not necessarily imply that Elisha had sought asylum there from any potential backlash, although the description in the Book of Amos, of the location being a refuge, is dated by textual scholars to be earlier than the accounts of Elisha in the Books of Kings.

==== Ottoman period ====
During the Ottoman Period, Mount Carmel was part of Turabay Emirate (1517–1683), which encompassed also the Jezreel Valley, Haifa, Jenin, Beit She'an Valley, northern Jabal Nablus, Bilad al-Ruha/Ramot Menashe, and the northern part of the Sharon plain.

The Druze settlement in the Carmel region is relatively recent, with the exact timing unclear. According to one tradition accepted by scholars, they settled in the ruins of ancient Huseife, now Isfiya after the defeat of the Lebanon-centered House Ma'an. Daliyat al-Karmel's population consisted of refugees from Aleppo who arrived in the early 19th century. Despite facing attacks from neighboring villages, the largest towns, Isfiya and Daliyat al-Carmel, persevered, possibly following the withdrawal of Ibrahim Pasha's army.

==== World War I ====
During World War I, Mount Carmel played a significant strategic role. The Battle of Megiddo took place at the head of a pass through the Carmel Ridge, which overlooks the Valley of Jezreel from the south. General Edmund Allenby led the British in the battle, which was a turning point in the war against the Ottoman Empire. The Jezreel Valley had played host to many battles before, including the historically very significant Battle of Megiddo between the Egyptians and Canaanites in the 15th century BCE, but it was only in the 20th-century battle that the Carmel Ridge itself played a significant part, due to the development in artillery and munitions.

== As a sacred location ==
=== Within Canaanite, Phoenician, and Syncretic Hellenistic Traditions ===
In ancient Canaanite religion, high places were frequently considered to be sacred, and Mount Carmel appears to have been no exception. Egyptian pharaoh Thutmose III lists a holy headland among his Canaanite territories, and if this equates to Carmel, as Egyptologists such as Maspero believe, then it would indicate that the mountain headland was considered sacred from at least the 15th century BCE.

In antiquity, Mount Carmel appears to have been a major center for worship of the Semitic storm god Hadad (Ba'al, Baalshamin). In 1952, archaeologist Michael Avi-Yonah published a Greek inscription carved on a sculpted leg discovered at Carmel, reading "To Heliopolitan Zeus of Carmel." This deity is the Greco-Roman form of Hadad, the Ba'al of Baalbek (also known in classical antiquity as Heliopolis). The inscription shows that by the 2nd century CE, the deity worshipped at the mountain had been identified with the Syrian-Phoenician storm god, whose worship centered on mountains, rain, thunder, and fire, the same attributes invoked in the biblical account of 1 Kings 18.

Classical writers describe an oracle on the mountain, which the Greeks identified with Zeus. Iamblichus describes Pythagoras visiting the mountain on account of its reputation for sacredness, stating that it was the most holy of all mountains, and access was forbidden to many, while Suetonius states that there was an oracle situated there, which Vespasian visited for a consultation; Tacitus states that there was an altar there, but without any image upon it, and without a temple around it. The existence of a pagan temple on Mount Carmel is supported by the Periplus of Pseudo-Scylax, a fourth century periplus that mentions Mount Carmel as the "mount and temple of Zeus".

=== Israelites and Hebrew Bible ===
==== Altar to God ====
According to the Books of Kings, there was an altar to God on the mountain, which had fallen into ruin by the time of Ahab, but Elijah built a new one, which was subsequently destroyed by fire from heaven, along with the sacrifice. (1 Kings 18:30–32).

==== Elijah ====
In mainstream Jewish, Christian, and Islamic thought, Elijah is indelibly associated with the mountain, and he is regarded as having sometimes resided in a grotto on the mountain. Indeed, one Arabic name for Mount Carmel is جبل مار إلياس (Jabal Mar Elyas, lit. "Mount of Saint Elias"). In the Books of Kings, Elijah challenges 450 prophets of Baal to a contest at the altar on Mount Carmel to determine whose deity was genuinely in control of the Kingdom of Israel. The role of the mountain in this story reflects its status as sacred. As the narrative is set during the rule of Ahab and his association with the Phoenicians, biblical scholars suspect that the Baal in question was probably Melqart. Archaeologist Michael Avi-Yonah and other scholars argue that the Ba'al defeated by Elijah was not Melqart, but Hadad, the "Lord of Heaven" (Baalshamin), a mountain and weather god whose cult was dominant among the Phoenicians.

According to chapter 18 of the Books of Kings in the Hebrew Bible, the challenge was to see which deity could light a sacrifice by fire. After the prophets of Baal had failed, Elijah had water poured upon his sacrifice to saturate the altar. He then prayed. Fire fell and consumed the sacrifice, wood, stones, soil and water, which prompted the Israelite witnesses to proclaim, "Yahweh, He is God! Yahweh, He is God!" In the account, Elijah also announced the end to a long three-year drought, which had previously been sent as divine punishment for Israel's idolatry.

Though there is no biblical reason to assume that the account of Elijah's victory refers to any particular part of Mount Carmel, Islamic tradition places it at a point known as El-Maharrakah or rather El-Muhraqa, meaning the burning.

Two areas have been hypothesized as the possible site for the story about the battle against the priests of Baal. The slaughter could have taken place near the river Kishon, at the mountain base, in an amphitheater-like flat area. The site where the offering took place is traditionally placed on the mountain above Yokneam, on the road to the Druze village of Daliyat el-Karmil, where there is a monastery, built in 1868, called El-Muhraqa ("the burning", possibly related to the burnt sacrifice"). It is regarded as one of the must-visit tour sites in the area of Haifa. (See below under "Carmelites (12th c.–present): El-Muhraqa site" for more).

Although archaeological clues are absent, the site is favoured because it has a spring, from which water could have been drawn to wet Elijah's offering. There is also a sea view, where Elijah looked out to see the cloud announcing rain. However, the biblical text states that Elijah had to climb up to see the sea. There is an altar in the monastery which is claimed to be that which Elijah built in God's honour, but that is unlikely, as it is not made of the local limestone.

Druze venerate Elijah, and he is considered a central figure in Druzism, and due to his importance in Druzism, the settlement of Druze on Mount Carmel had partly to do with Elijah's story and devotion. There are two large Druze towns on the eastern slopes of Mount Carmel: Daliyat al-Karmel and Isfiya.

=== Carmelites (12th century – present) ===
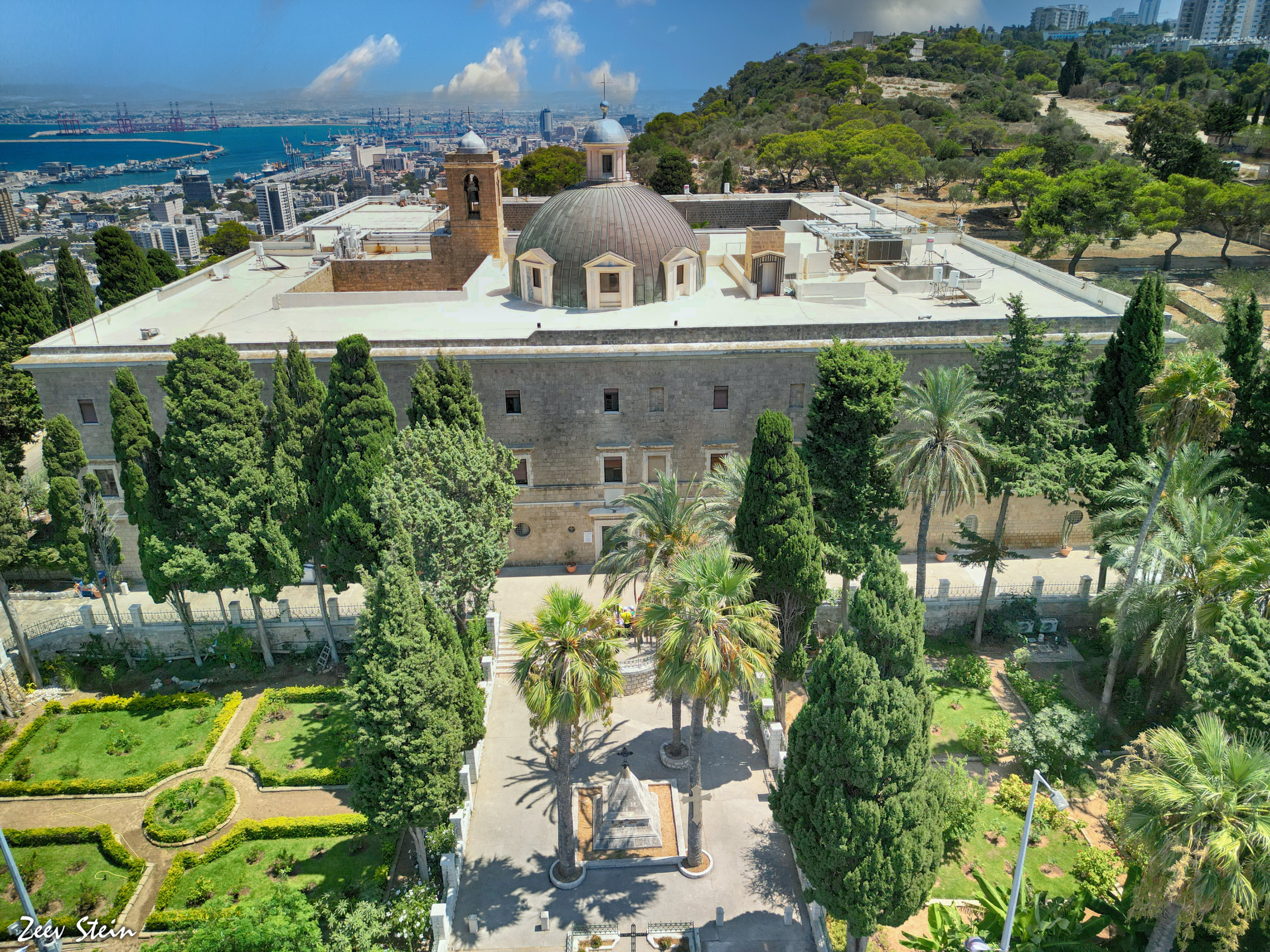
Stella Maris Monastery in Haifa

A Catholic religious order was founded on Mount Carmel in 1209, named the Carmelites, in reference to the mountain range; the founder of the Carmelites is still unknown (d.1265). In the original Rule or 'Letter of Life' given by Albert, the Latin Patriarch of Jerusalem who was resident in Acre, around the year 1210, this hermit is referred to simply as 'Brother B'; he probably died around the date 1210 and could have been either a pilgrim, someone serving out a penance or a crusader who had stayed in the Holy Land.

Although Louis IX of France is sometimes named as the founder, he was not, and had merely visited it in 1252.

==== Stella Maris site ====
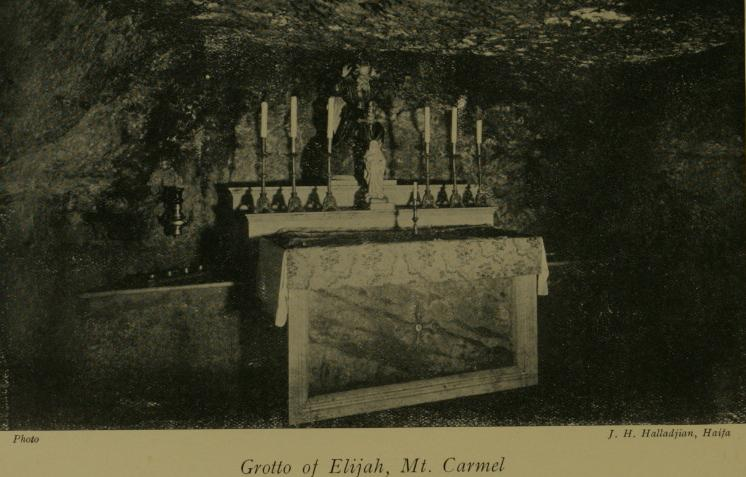
According to Carmelite tradition, the crypt of the Stella Maris Monastery, seen here on a 1913 photo, was originally the hiding cave of Elijah

The Order was founded at the site that it claimed had been the location of Elijah's cave, 1,700 feet (520 m) above sea level at the northwestern end of the mountain range.

Though there is no documentary evidence to support it, Carmelite tradition suggests that a community of Jewish hermits had lived at the site from the time of Elijah until the Carmelites were founded there; prefixed to the Carmelite Constitution of 1281 was the claim that from the time when Elijah and Elisha had dwelt devoutly on Mount Carmel, priests and prophets, Jewish and Christian, had lived "praiseworthy lives in holy penitence" adjacent to the site of the "fountain of Elisha" in an uninterrupted succession.

A Carmelite monastery was founded at the site shortly after the Order itself was created, and was dedicated to the Blessed Virgin Mary under the title of "Star of the Sea" ("stella maris" in Latin), a common medieval presentation of her.

The Carmelite Order grew to be one of the major Catholic religious orders worldwide, although the monastery at Carmel has had a less successful history. During the Crusades the monastery often changed hands, frequently being converted into a mosque. In 1799 the building was finally converted into a hospital, by Napoleon, but in 1821 the surviving structure was destroyed by the pasha of Damascus. A new monastery was later constructed directly over a nearby cave, after funds were collected by the Carmelite Order for restoration of the monastery. The cave, which now forms the crypt of the monastic church, is termed "Elijah's grotto" by the Discalced Carmelite friars who have custody of the monastery.

==== El-Muhraqa site ====
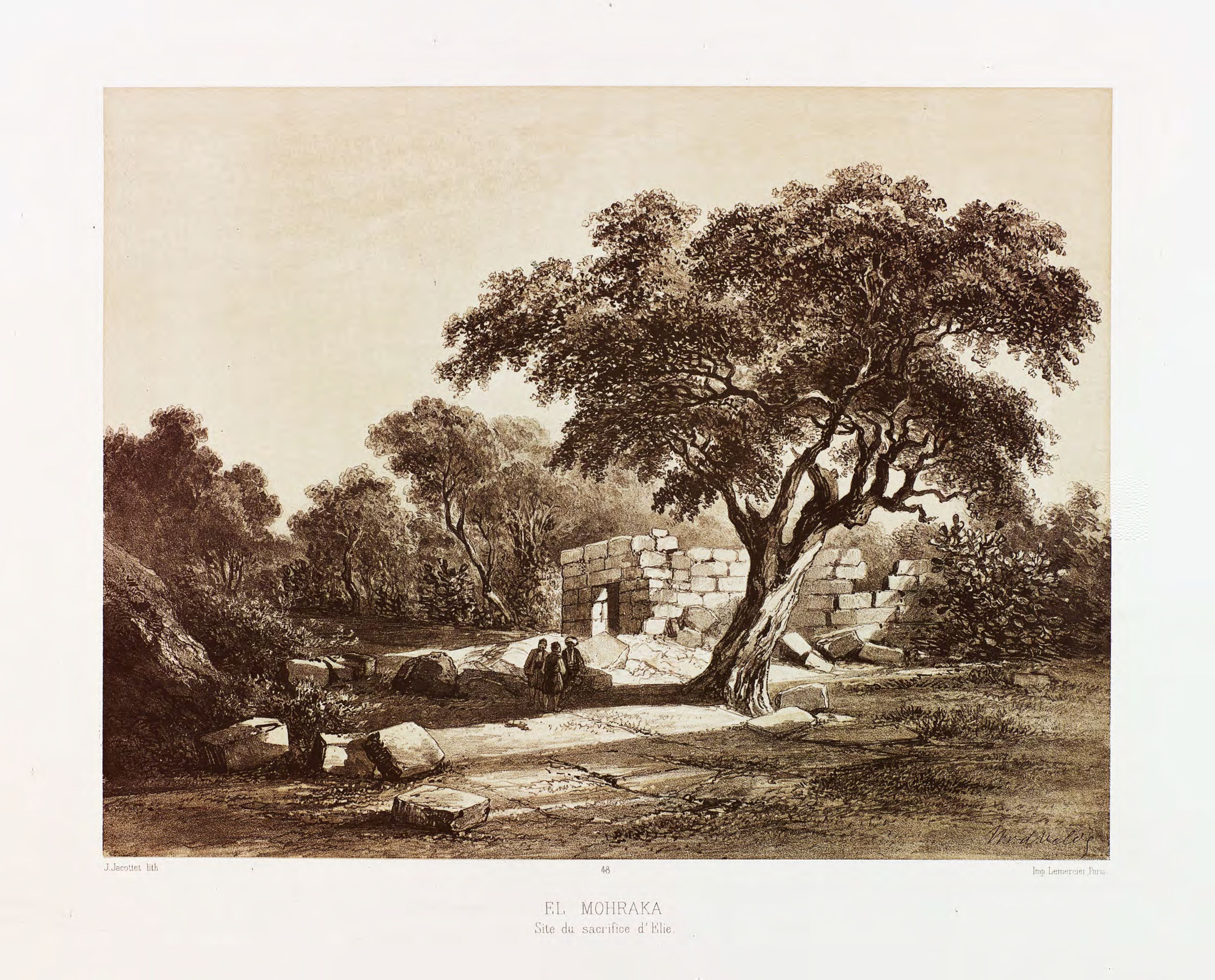
El-Mohraka, in the 1850s, as depicted by van de Velde

Under Islamic control the location at the highest peak of the Carmel came to be known as "El-Maharrakah" or "El-Muhraqa", meaning "place of burning", in reference to the account of Elijah's challenge to the priests of Hadad. This, perhaps not coincidentally, is also the highest natural point of the mountain range.

==== The Scapular of Our Lady of Mount Carmel ====
One of the oldest scapulars is associated with Mount Carmel and the Carmelites. According to Carmelite tradition, the Scapular of Our Lady of Mount Carmel was first given to St. Simon Stock, an English Carmelite, by the Blessed Virgin Mary. The Carmelites refer to her under the title "Our Lady of Mount Carmel", and celebrate 16 July as her feast day.

=== Baháʼí Faith ===
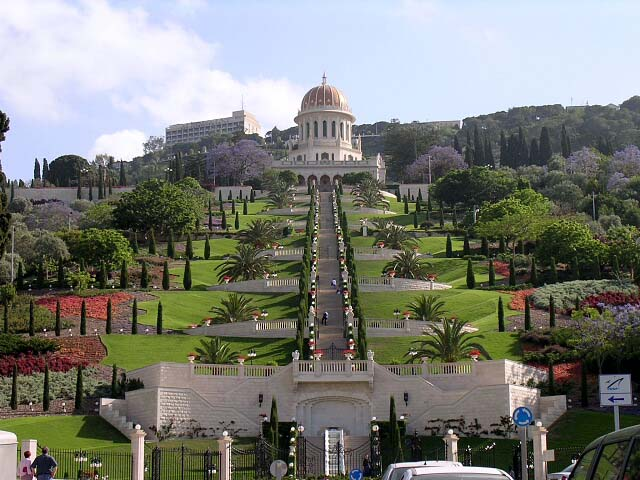
The Shrine of the Báb and its Terraces on Mount Carmel, 2004

Mount Carmel is considered a sacred place for followers of the Baháʼí Faith, and is the location of the Baháʼí World Centre and the Shrine of the Báb. The location of the Baháʼí holy places has its roots in the imprisonment of the religion's founder, Bahá'u'lláh, near Haifa by the Ottoman Empire during the Ottoman Empire's rule over Palestine.

The Shrine of the Báb is a structure where the remains of the Báb, the founder of Bábism and forerunner of Bahá'u'lláh in the Baháʼí Faith, have been laid to rest. The shrine's precise location on Mount Carmel was designated by Bahá'u'lláh himself and the Báb's remains were laid to rest on March 21, 1909, in a six-room mausoleum made of local stone. The construction of the shrine with a golden dome was completed over the mausoleum in 1953, and a series of decorative terraces around the shrine were completed in 2001. The white marbles used were from the same ancient source that most Athenian masterpieces were using, the Penteliko Mountain.

Bahá'u'lláh, the founder of the Baháʼí Faith, writing in the Tablet of Carmel, designated the area around the shrine as the location for the administrative headquarters of the religion; the Baháʼí administrative buildings were constructed adjacent to the decorative terraces, and are referred to as the Arc, on account of their physical arrangement.

=== Ahmadiyya Muslims ===
The Ahmadiyya Muslim Community has its largest Israeli mosque on Mount Carmel, in the Kababir quarter of Haifa, known as the Mahmood Mosque. It is a unique structure with two minarets. The mosque was once visited by the president of Israel, Shimon Peres, for an iftar dinner.

== Gallery ==
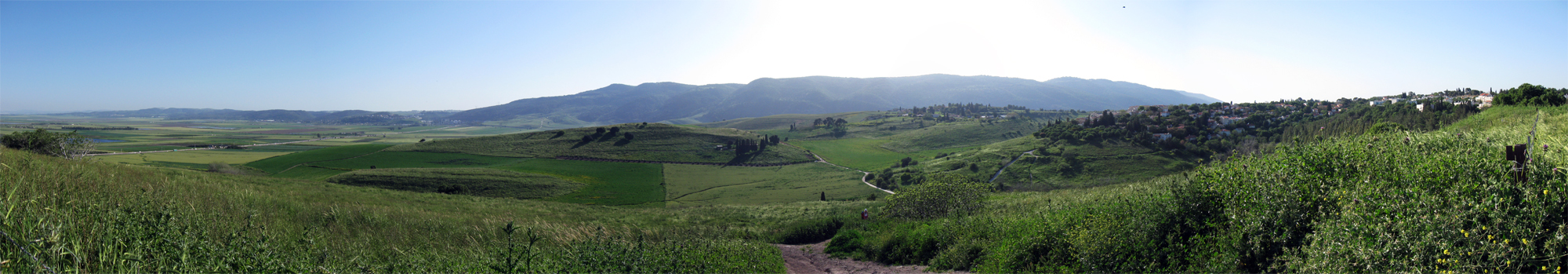
A panorama of the Carmel mountain range

== See also ==
- Mount Carmel National Park
- Nahal Me'arot Nature Reserve
- Mount Carmel Forest Fire (2010)
- Sacred Heart Chapel, Haifa
- Our Lady of Mount Carmel
- Palestine Final Fortress
- Tablet of Carmel
