= List of Israel Defense Forces bases =

The following is a list of military bases operated by the Israel Defense Forces, sorted by command.

== Northern Command ==
Name	Location
Batar Dotan	Pardes Hanna-Karkur
Machne Yarden	Golan Heights
Camp Filon	Golan Heights
Haifa naval base	Haifa
BHD 600	Haifa
Atlit naval base	near Atlit
Prison Six	near Atlit
Havat HaShomer Training Base	near Ilaniya
Biranit	Galilee
Ramat David Airbase	near Ramat David
Air Force Technical College	Haifa
Michve Alon	near Safed
Camp Tzalmon	near Karmiel
Camp Gibor	near Kiryat Shmona
Ein Shemer Airfield	near Ein Shemer
Eilabun Nuclear Facility	near Eilabun
Camp Jalame	Haifa
Camp Yitzhak	Golan Heights
Mount Avital SIGINT base	Mount Avital
Château Pèlerin	near Haifa
Manachim Airbase	Rosh Pinna
Shomera Armory	Shomera

== Central Command ==
Name	Location
Camp Anatot	near Jerusalem
Camp Bar Lev	near Kiryat Malakhi
Camp Glilot	near Herzliya
National Defense College	near Herzliya
Unit 8200 Headquarters	Herzliya
Camp AK47	Har Nof
Camp Immanuel	near Kiryat Malakhi
Camp Mordechai Maklef	Ramat Gan
Camp Rabin	Tel Aviv
Camp 1391	near Tel Aviv
Palmachim Airbase	near Yavne
Sde Dov Airbase	Tel Aviv
Sdot Micha Airbase	near Zekharia
Tel Nof Airbase	near Gedera
Camp Yigael Yadin	Tzrifin
Camp Yaakov Dori	Tel HaShomer
Camp Yoav	near Kiryat Malakhi
Camp Mota Gur	near Kfar Yona
Ofrit base	Jerusalem
Bahad 8	Netanya
Hatzor Airbase	near Hatzor
Tirosh Nuclear Facility	near Tirosh
Sirkin base	near Kfar Sirkin
Mitkan Adam	near Modi'in-Maccabim-Re'ut
Lod Airbase	Lod

== Southern Command ==
Name	Location
Ashdod Naval Base	Ashdod
Eilat Naval Base	Eilat
Camp Haim Laskov	near Mitzpe Ramon
Hatzerim Airbase	near Hatzerim
Camp Iftach	near Zikim
Camp Lahav	near Nitzana Border Crossing
Nevatim Airbase	near Nevatim
Camp Nitzanim	near Nitzanim
Camp Yehoshua	near Nitzanim
Ovda Airport	near Eilat
Ramon Airbase	near Sde Boker
Bahad 4	near Zikim
Sde Boker base	near Sde Boker
Re'im base	near Re'im
Nahal Oz base	near Kibbutz Nahal Oz
Camp Nathan	near Beersheba
Ktzi'ot Prison camp	near Beersheba
Shizafon base	Negev
Southern Infantry Training Base	near Beersheba
Julis base	near Malakhi Junction
Urim SIGINT Base	near Urim
Brigade Training Base – Nahal	near Arad
