= Adi Gigi =

Israeli businesswoman

- עדי גיגי
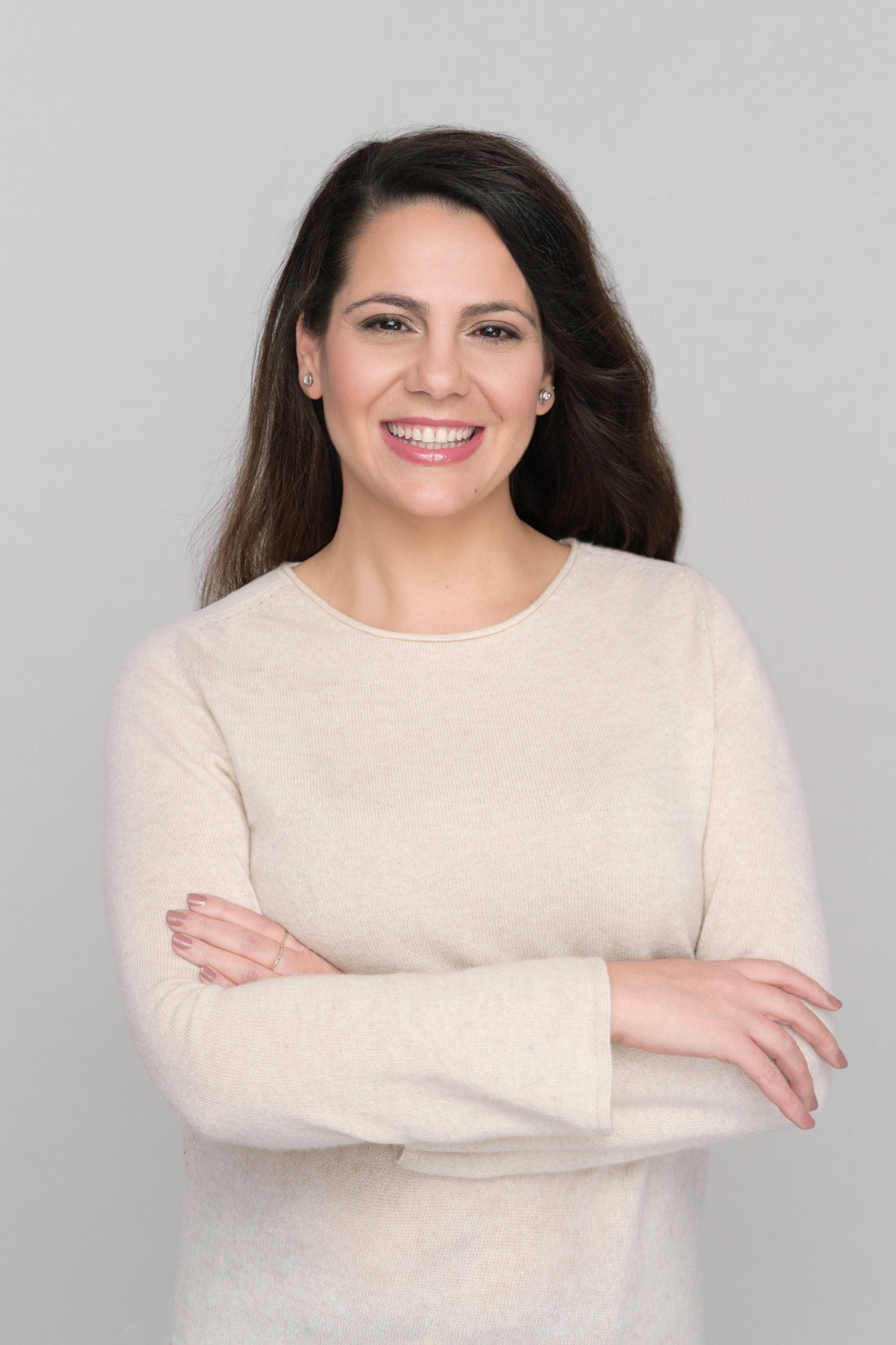
- Born: 1984 (age 41–42)
- Education: Harvard University; Stanford University

Adi Gigi (Hebrew: עדי גיגי; born on April 11, 1984) is an Israeli businesswoman and entrepreneur. She served as the inaugural director and general manager of Tesla in Israel between 2017 and 2023. In this role, Gigi led the efforts to transition Israel's auto industry to electric vehicles. In 2003 she became the first woman to graduate from the Israeli Naval Academy, as an electronics officer. She then went on to serve six years in the Israeli Navy, where she specialized in energy security. Following the discovery of the Tamar gas field off the shore of Israel in 2013, Gigi became a founding member of the natural gas production platform. This assisted the transition of the Israeli electricity sector from coal to natural gas, achieving Israel's energy-independence for the first time since its establishment. She was the first woman to build and lead an auto company in Israel. In 2021 Gigi was recognized by Israel's Globes Magazine as well as Calcalist Magazine as one of Israel's 100 most influential people.

== Early life and education ==
Gigi was born in Netanya, Israel. At the age of 21, she graduated from the Israeli Naval Academy of the Israeli Defense Force. In 2002, Gigi joined the programming school of the Israeli Defense Forces, the Computing and Cyber Defense Academy, Mamram. In 2003 she was the first woman to serve as an electronics officer in the Israeli Navy, and went on to be discharged with the rank of Lieutenant Commander, equivalent to an Army Major. Her naval service included roles such as heading the Electronics Division, serving as a Product Manager. In October 2023, with the outbreak of the “Iron Swords” war, she was called up for reserve duty in the Navy. After several months of service under an emergency call-up order (Tzav 8), she was promoted to the rank of Lieutenant Colonel, thereby becoming the first female naval officer in the reserves to reach this rank.

She studied law at Bar-Ilan University, and won the Sloan fellowship to study at Stanford University's School of Business.

== Career ==
At Stanford, she specialized in data analytics startups. This startup, called Perdicity, was aimed to address issues of unforeseen machine downtime through the application of artificial intelligence techniques. In 2009, she joined the Prime Minister of Israel and served there as a Policy Analyst. During her time at the Prime Minister's Office, she was involved in addressing social and economic matters and even took charge of negotiations for Israel's entry into the OECD countries. In 2013, she became a member of the youth forum established by the late President Shimon Peres.

In 2016, she received the Eisenhower Fellowship in recognition of her leadership abilities. In 2017, Gigi joined Tesla, working under Elon Musk in establishing Tesla's operations in Israel with a model that involved direct activity without a local importer. Under her guidance, Tesla Israel established a network of fast charging stations and introduced energy storage facilities to the Israeli market. While she ran Tesla, Tesla's Model 3 became the most common electric car in Israel. Gigi's commitment to sustainable energy has helped accelerate the transition to electric vehicles and safer autonomous driving in Israel. She is a graduate of the MA'OZ program for public leadership training, and as part of it she also completed a Leadership and Entrepreneurship Fellowship at Harvard University in 2023.

== Personal life ==
Gigi founded the "Shemesh" Daycare Center from 2000 to 2002, and initiated The Gifted Project (2001 - 2004), a collaborative effort with Erika Landau's Institution for Gifted Kids.
