= Israeli Naval Shipyards =

Israeli Naval institution

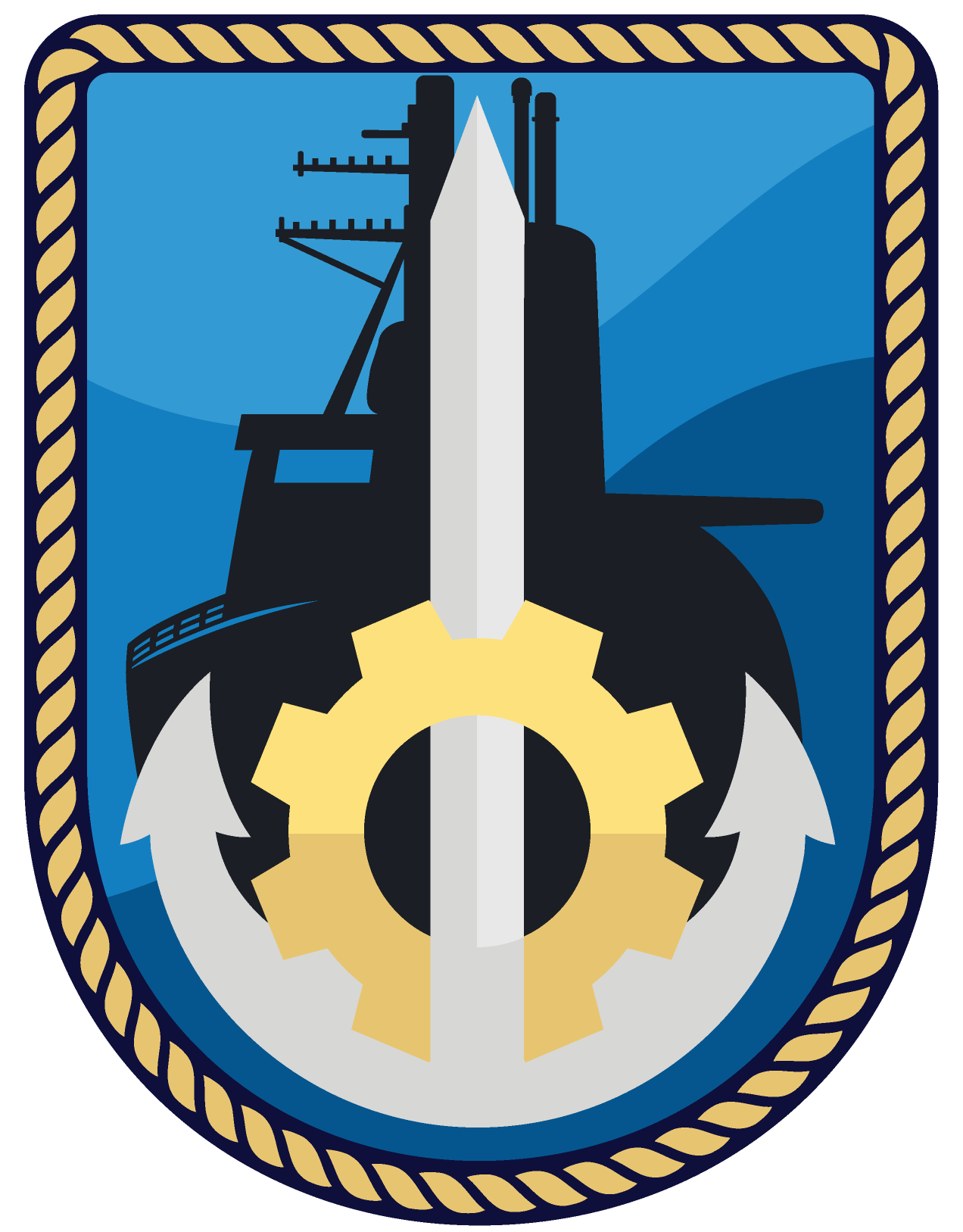
Israeli Naval Shipyards
- Israel
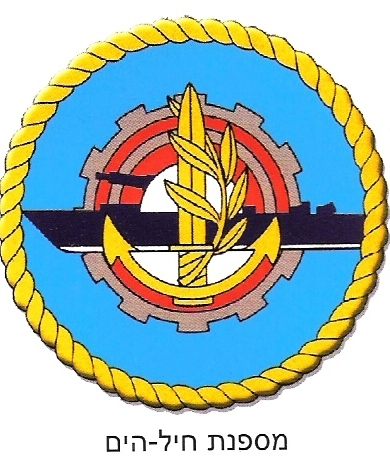
- Coat of Arms

Site information
- Type: Shipyard
- Owner: Israel Defense Forces
- Operator: Israeli Navy

Garrison information
- Garrison: Israeli Navy

Israeli Naval Shipyards is the institution within the Israeli Navy concerned with shipbuilding and ship repairs. Three shipyards—Haifa, Eilat, and Atlit—and several Israeli naval workshops are under the command of this institution. It was established during the 1948 Palestine war along with that of Israeli Navy, its origin traces back to the British Naval Shipyard in Haifa established in 1942 during the Second World War.

== Roles ==
The roles of the shipyards are

- To maintain the vessels in operational conditions.
- The upgrading of the operational capacity of the vessels by integration of more advanced technologies and changing body structure.
- Mid-life overhaul of a submarines.
- Reception of imported vessels.
- Maintenance of the control system and the coast stations.

== Installations ==
Name	Location	Designated occupation
Haifa Shipyard	West of Haifa naval base	Ship repairs and construction
Engine workshop	near the Mount Carmel naval equipment base	Ship repairs
BHD 600 workshop	in Bat Galim near the BHD 600	Electronic equipment
Atlit Shipyard	near the Atlit naval base	a workshop for Shayetet 13 vessels
Synchrolift workshop	near the Haifa naval base	Lifting of vessels
Eilat Shipyard	near the Eilat Naval Base	Ship repairs

== Haifa Shipyard ==
=== Establishment of British shipyard ===
The professional infrastructure in naval engineering in Israel which was used by the navy in its establishment began in the British shipyard in Haifa which operated from the beginning of 1942 and served the British army in handling damaged vessels and adapting them to a military purpose in real time. At the height of its activity, the shipyard employed about 1000 people. Father Khushi expressed its future importance in writing in one of the memos that appear in his archives : "It may be possible after the war to purchase all the equipment and the workshops and it would be appropriate for this factory to be transferred to a trust . "

At that time, World War II was at its peak. Most of the coast of the Mediterranean, except for Turkey and Spain, is under the control of the Axis powers. The Allies held Egypt, Mandatory Palestine and later Syria and Lebanon. At the end of 1942, within the Haifa Port area, the PWD Public Works Department under the management of the Jewish engineer Peretz Willard Etx erected three or four buildings, some of them made of concrete with tin roofs and some made of wood with tin roofs. The entire complex was surrounded by a high fence and the entrance to it was through a gate for pedestrians and a gate for vehicles identified as gate number 11. The area was highly classified and guarded. The British shipyard in Malta was responsible for the shipyard in Haifa. On December 25, 1942, the shipyard was registered under the company Shipwrights & Engineers ME LTD. The purpose of this company was to conduct marine engineering business in the repair, construction and maintenance of steamships. The senior workers at the shipyard were brought from Malta and their terms of employment were according to the contract in Malta. In Haifa, technical personnel were recruited through the labor office of the Haifa Workers' Council and the employment office of the Arab sector. The manpower was diverse and included carpenters, plumbers, engravers, solders and welders, metal workers, instrument makers, boiler makers, builders and general workers. In addition, manual workers were recruited for "beard scraping" jobs, etc., and most of them were day laborers . The payment to the simple day laborers was daily.

Inside the buildings that were erected for the shipyard were two halls where the maritime professionals worked and where they repaired parts of ships that were damaged. A floating probe was brought from Malta which was the only one in the port. From time to time, special work tools were brought from there to repair ships. The shipyard worked seven days a week on Saturdays and holidays and fully responded to the needs of the Royal Navy. In one case the shipyard converted a cargo ship into a passenger ship and the ship was the Tripolitania.

The shipyard's offices were located in Haifa at the offices of HAIFA SHIPPING AGENCY LTD on 82 Malkim Street in one of the Aziz Khayat buildings . One of the shipyard's employees was the engineer Levy, whose daughter Hana Levy worked in the shipyard's secretariat. The chief secretary of the shipyard was Rebecca Watson, the wife of Lionel Watson, the engineer of the city of Haifa. The engineer Aryeh Gutesman was the chief foreman. Aryeh Mehulel was the director of the labor department and his title was Chief Time Keeper, Aryeh who was a man of the Echelon was pulled from the shipyard by the CID, arrested at his home on March 2, 1944, and exiled to Eritrea .

On July 30, 1945, a notice was published in the official newspaper of the Palestine government (The Palestine Gazette in the English edition), issue number 1424, regarding the voluntary liquidation of the company and John Cuthbert Kochs was appointed liquidator. The floating test was returned to Malta.

=== Construction of Israeli shipyard ===
The core of the professional workforce for the construction of the Israeli Navy shipyard infrastructure came from three professional bodies:

- The two workshops of the shipyards in Israel during the days of the mandate: Shipwrights & Engineers and Kirstein & Greenspon, headed by Herzl Greenspon.
- Yishuv volunteers for the British Royal Navy.
- Navy personnel from the American Navy and the Royal Navy.

A company Shipwrights & Engineers operated in Mandatory Palestine to repair ships of the British military fleet and the commercial fleet. The company ceased its activities in Israel at the end of World War II. The company employed professionals from the settlement who in this way acquired their experience working in ship repair and workshop management.

A new company, "Haifa Engineering Factories"- Kirstein & Grinshpon started operating in Israel. Kirstein was a qualified engineer for marine engineering, who became the expert of the British Royal Navy in all naval ship repairs in the Middle East. When the Shipwrights & Engineers left, the Israeli workers, moved to the Kirstein & Grinshpon company, which developed and took over most of the shipping work in Israel. A large workshop was opened at the intersection of Sderot, Ha-Histadrut and Kfar-Ata. Before that, the name of this intersection was "Pilar Locomotive". After the 1948 Palestine war, Kirstein & Grinshpon entered into a partnership with " Soll Bona ", and "Hima" was established. The "Hima" company was the precursor of "Israel Shipyards".

The Kirstein & Greensphon factory worked for the "Haganah", and its main work was in the production of mines, grenades, mortar bombs, mortars and armored vehicles. In addition, the factory built small naval vessels.

=== Ship conversions ===
During the 1948 Palestine war, the workforce at the Kirstein & Greensphon factory worked under economic lockout orders. During the day they worked in the factory, and during the night the workers went on guard and security duties. At the same time, as part of the effort to occupy the Hebrew labor in the Port of Haifa, the members of the port company arrived with Yohai Ben Nun and a group of professionals was formed in preparation for the process of converting the civilian ships of the Shadow Fleet into the first naval ships. From intelligence reports that reached the Hagana, they learned of the intention of the British, who were still in control of the port even though they had evacuated the country, to blow up the ships and close the port. This information reached Israel as early as 1946 but later proved to be false.

Amidst fears that British authorities would sink ships in the port of Haifa, the shipyard workers took them out of the harbor and dismantled everything essential to the operation of the ship. The equipment was hidden somewhere in the port. The Wedgwood and the Haganah were steamships, therefore all the pressure gauges, the rudder, everything that could be disassembled was disassembled from them so that it would be impossible to take the ships out independently, but only to tow them. In this way, the possibility of drowning in the middle of the sea was neutralized. When the British left the port the ships were reassembled and smuggled out of the port, of which three large ships were of Eilat (a -16) class, named the State of the Jews, the Regius, and the Haganah.

In 1957, Colonel Aryeh Kaplan "Kippi" saw that there was one old ship left in the port and it was the Nevertheless. With the help of the anchor company and the naval shipyard, the ship was cut into four parts and was moved to its designated place as a museum.

=== The establishment of the shipyard ===
The initial recruitment for the Israeli Navy was conducted at 29 Jaffa Street by the head of personnel of the naval services, Shlomo Jacobson, from the Yishuv volunteers for the British Royal Navy . Jacobson referred the navy volunteers to the navy, many of the Royal Navy personnel were professionals and with a background of an organized war navy and the initial technical avenue in the navy was formed.

The naval shipyards were established at the initiative of Joe Novek, a Yishuv volunteer for the British Royal Navy. The beginning of the shipyard was at the intersection of Sderot al-Malikim and the German colony where the workshops of the British Public Works Department were situated. The first shipyard workers were Joe Novick and five Yishuv volunteers. The shipyard's initial equipment came from the collection of a variety of equipment from Arab workshops that were abandoned in Haifa during the 1948 Palestine war. The initial camp in the Haifa area was at Hoof Shemen and later he was located at the Haifa naval base in Bat Galim.

With the growth of the shipyard and the workshops, the need arose for a large and orderly building in the port. Warehouse building 4 was bombed by the Egyptians, therefore the Port Authority offered this destroyed building to the Israeli Navy as the shipyard site. The engineering personnel moved to the workshops in the Port of Haifa near the customs house in warehouse 4 near the entrance to the fuel dock. Most of the manpower was from civilian workshops and without an understanding of the professional organizational side of a shipyard as well as an understanding of the structure and requirements of a military shipyard. There was a shortage of manpower and Joe Novick realized that he would not accept soldiers for the shipyard, so he recruited civilians with relevant professions, who became civilian Israel Defense Forces (IDF) workers at the shipyard.

Beyond that, there was a need to establish professional bodies such as electrical department, electronics department, ship hull workshop, damage control, carpentry, underwater work, instrumentation.

The following five officers from the Yishuv volunteers to the British Royal Navy came to fill these positions :

- Benjamin Castle - mechanical engineer
- Halperin - construction engineer
- Lauterbach and Steuer - electrical engineers.
- Levin - chemical engineer

In addition, following volunteers also came:

- Shmuel Winterfeld - electrical trains for transport
- Izzy Moser - Israeli Navy officer
- Jacob Krauss - Ship Workshop

Dick Rosenberg came to the Electronics Division from the United States Navy. He was trained as an artillery officer and was assigned to become a liaison officer later a professor at the Technion in the Faculty of Industry and Management on the subject of behavioral sciences and Rusk who returned to the United States.

The engineering and inspection officer headquarters came from the Yishuv volunteers to the British Royal Navy such as Luther an electrical engineer, Messinger a mechanical engineer, Edmond Wilhelm Brillant a mechanical engineer, Thorpe an electrical engineer.

With the arrival of Paul Shulman, other professionals arrived from the United States Navy and received appointments in the Israeli Navy, for example Jonathan Lev a United States Naval Academy graduate was entrusted with the naval gunnery. Philip Strauss with the inspection of the machinery departments of the ships at sea and the engineering division on the shore, Haim Gershoni was appointed supervisor of shipyard operations and the position of corrections officer. During the conversion of the qualifying ships into a makeshift war fleet, friction arose between Gershoni and Joe Novick. One of the cases that caused friction between Gershoni and Novik was the installation of cannons on the ships of the Shadow Fleet. Napoleonics were Italian cannons from 1912, these were the first cannons that were able to be bought in Italy at the end of 1948. and these were the cannons that were assembled. Four such guns arrived, and they had to be mounted on the corvettes, Wedgwood and Haganah. The cannons were assembled from improvised materials found in Israel, and a week later the cannons were assembled. Due to the circumstances Gershoni left and later described this period in his autobiographical book The Way it Was.

Qualified engineers who were officers came from the US Navy. Among them Robert Allen who was a ship engineer certified by Webb Institute in New York and MIT, decided to stay in Israel. He settled in Haifa with his wife and son and received Israeli citizenship. Alan advanced to the position of head of the naval architecture branch in the Ministry of Defense (Israel) at the rank of lieutenant colonel. In 1956 the family decided to leave Israel.

=== Establishment of hall ===
In 1950, the Navy wanted to invite the prime minister of Israel, David Ben-Gurion, to the graduation ceremony of the recruits. The prime minister expressed his willingness to come but the security, ruled out the Palace Cinema for security reasons emphasizing arrangements in a naval installation. So the shipyard built a hall measuring one hundred and twenty by thirty metres (394 by 98 ft). The hall where the ceremony took place was called "David" barracks after the prime minister in whose honor it was built.

=== Suez Crisis ===
During the Suez Crisis, a major operations of the shipyard was the transfer of torpedo ships on carriers from Haifa to Eilat. Moreover, an Egyptian destroyer, Ibrahim Al Awwal, was captured and towed to the Port of Haifa and was restored by the navy's shipyard and its name was K-38 AHI Haifa.

=== Six Day War ===
On the eve of the Six Day War, the shipyard very quickly finished the renovations of the destroyer Eilat which returned to service after the INS Haifa (K-38) had ceased to be active.

== Eilat Shipyard ==
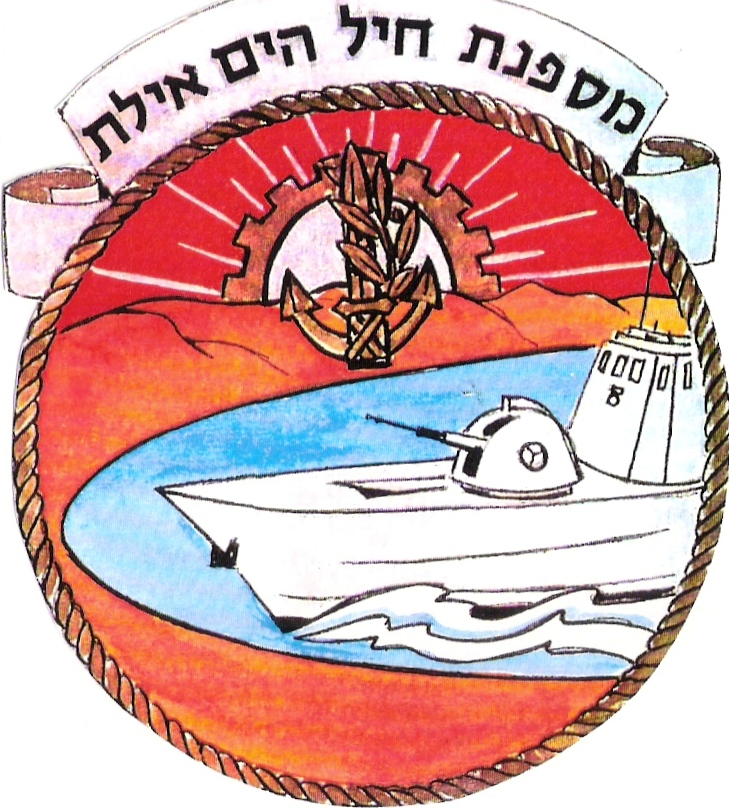
Coat of Arms of Eilat Shipyard

=== Establishment ===
The branch of the shipyard in Eilat was established to serve the vessels in the Eilat Naval Base during the War of Attrition. In order to establish it, Lt. Col. Chaim Shtoyer was sent there.

=== History ===
On January 24, 1970, a disaster hit the Port of Eilat and the navy shipyard known as the ammunition truck disaster after the raid on Shadoan Island. In this disaster, 24 soldiers were killed, along with 5 civilian shipyard workers.

Lt. Col. Moshe Omen Oxman was appointed as the first shipyard commander in 1973 and established Mesha Synchrolift.

In 1981, the shipyard repaired the hull of INS Geash, after the unwanted beaching on the Saudi Arabian coast. The activity included salvage and flooding from the Saudi coast, towing to the Eilat Naval Base, shipping and repair to an operational condition.

== Atlit Shipyard ==
=== Establishment ===
After the establishment of Shayetet 13, the research and planning division of the Weapons Development Authority, began a project based on sabotage boats that were manufactured in Italy and which were used to sink Emir Farooq. A new model passed the tests in Shipyard until March 1954 and in April of that year it was tested by the Navy and its production began. In 1956 the boats entered operational use in the Navy.

=== Integration into Naval Shipyards ===
After the integration of Shayetet 13 into the Navy, the Shayetet 13 shipyard was subordinated to the Naval Shipyard. In 1958, bodies of pigs were developed by Lt. Col. Haim Shachel. The design was outsourced to the Orlight plant in Ness Ziona and in 1963 a molded fiberglass model was launched as a unified body and not composed of separate parts.

Covert repairs and operations were also carried out in this shipyard.

== Commanders ==
order	Name	Command period	Note	Image
1	Joe Novick	1948–1950	First Commander	
2	Yaakov Shafi	1951–1957	Integration of Worksops (such as Atlit) into the main body.	
3	Yosef ben Shmuel	1957–1961	Submarine refurbishments	
4	Joshua Lahav	1961–1964		
5	Alex Dotan	1964–1969		
6	Sholoma Koren	1969–1971		
7	Emmanuel Yanai	1971–1973	Involved in Cherbourg Project	
8	Baruch Vared	1973–1976		
9	Hanuch ben Eliyahu	1976-1979		
10	Alex Farran	1979–1982		
11	Yishi Harmati	1982–1986		
12	Gabai David	1986–1988		
13	Abraham Neve	1988–1991		
14	Dani Shaham	1991–1994		
15	Adam Eisen	1994–1997		
16	Yossi Shemer	1997-1999		
17	Omari Degul	1999–2002		
18	David Arbel	2002–2005		
19	Danny Fox	2005–2007		
20	Eitan Zucker	2007–2009		
21	Moshe Zena	2009–2011		
22	Eli Shokh	2011-2013		
23	Yossi Ashkenazi	2011–2015		
24	Dodi Yosef	2015-2017		
25	Flatty Schurtz	2017-2019		
26	Amir Chimani	2019- August 2023		
27	Unclear	From August 2023		

== Sources and references ==
- Joshua, דע את המספנה Navy 8th Shebat 579, p. 20.
- להיות או לחדול - דיון על עתיד המספנה, Navy 8th Shebat 579, p. 21.
- Gershoni, המספנה / בשולי הדיון The Navy, 9 Adar 579, p. 37.
- על תרומת מתנדבי מח"ל מארצות הברית לחיל הים מאת דייוויד הנוביץ' מח"ל קצין מכונה מהצי האמריקאי
- God. tour, צי הצללים קם לתחיה, "Naval Systems" 37–38, The Decade File for the Navy, July 1958, p. 51.
- Grape Adam, כך שיפצנו אוניות, "Naval Systems" 37–38, The Decade File for the Navy, July 1958, p. 53.
- Haim Levy, מספנת חיל הים, "Marine Systems" n.d., July 1961, p. 26.
- Orly Azoulai, "מנועים מלא קדימה", 'Marine Systems' 110, November 1972, p. 40.
- Julie Falterer, פרס עובד צהל מצטיין לאיש מספנה, 'Between Waves' March 1976, p. 5.
- A. Lish, חיל הים שיפץ לראשונה צוללת, 'Marine Systems' 61, September 1962 p. 3.
- על חברת אימקו תעשיות בע"מ
- רשימת מקבלי אות יקיר התעשייה ע"ש אריה שנקר
- Avraham Maron, המחוגים חזרו לאחור - מספנת חיל הים, "Marine Systems" Booklet No. 85-86 July 1967, pp. 14 – 19.
- Meir Shapir, במספנה, "Marine Systems" 95, August 1969, p. 18.
- Meir Shapir and Aryeh Doblin מספנת חיל הים 'Marine Systems' 102–103, March 1971, p. 46.
- על מספנות SwiftShip בארצות הברית
- הטיל גבריאל הקדים את תפיסת הסטי"ל סיקור באתר פרש
- Sharon Harpaz, מספנת חיל הים חוגגת 36 שנה להיווסדה, 'Between Waves' 162 July 1984 p. 38.
- Raanan Czerbinski,מספרה לחיילות המספנה וגם אומנות הציור של ינינה פטליצקי, 'Between Waves' 167 April 1986 pp. 17 and 55.
- Raanan Charbinski and Ruthie Rodner, "מהצד של האין מנוע" - הע"צים של מספנת חיל הים, 'Between Waves' 173 March 1988 p. 23.
- Father Obel, חנוכת בנין הידרו מכני וקורס מנהלי מחסנים, 'Between Waves' 177 April 1989 p. 11.
- Hana Yanai, מספנת חיל הים לדורותיה, Navy Publishing House, 1998.
- Aryeh Kiesel, בלעדיהם אף ספינה לא שטה, "Bin Galim" celebratory jubilee issue October 1998, p. 54.
- Father Obel, המספנה, "Between Waves" issue October 1, 2001 p. 20.
- Shimon Alterman, מצטיין ההיי טק ממספנות חיל הים - אעצ בני כהן תכנת בכיר, "Between Waves" issue October 1, 2001 p. 86.
- Yitzhak Aviel and Lior Nagar, סוד הכוח של מספנת חיל הים, "Between Waves", January 2014, p. 58.
- David Bar Yosef, צוות לעניין אנשי המספנה בעת חירום, "Between Waves", October 2014, p. 87.
- Shaked Tobis, תג משקף DNA למספנת חיל הים, The IDF recruits website, December 12, 2021.
