= Israeli Naval Academy =

Naval officer training course

The Israeli Naval Academy is the initial naval officer training academy of the Israeli Navy. The training takes place at the Naval Command School at BHD 600, the Navy's training base, located in Haifa. It is considered one of the most prestigious academies in the IDF, alongside the Israeli Air Force Flight Academy.

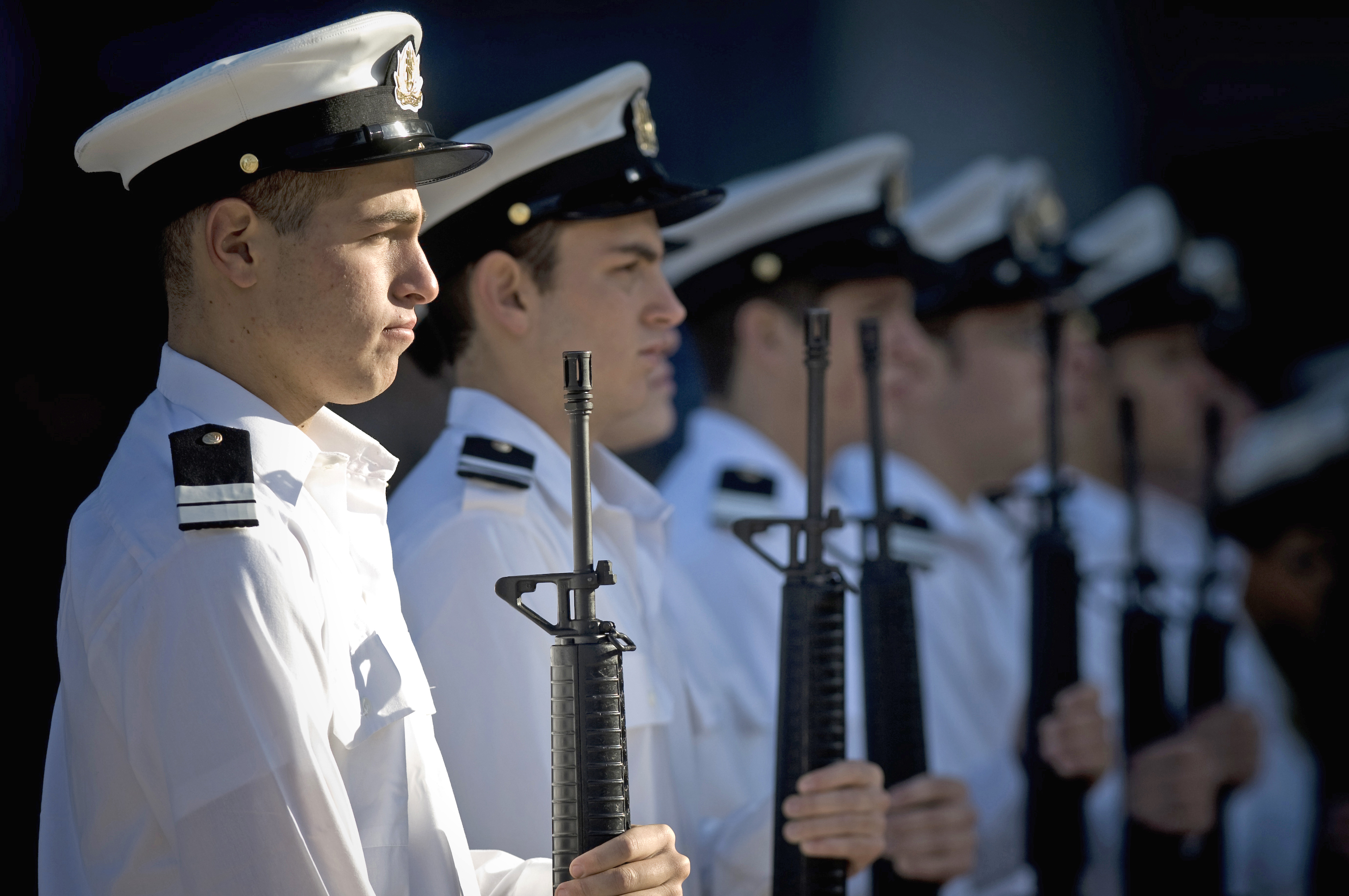
Israeli naval cadets

On average, only one out of four cadets completes the course successfully. The course is three years long, and cadets graduate with a B.A. from the University of Haifa and an officer rank of Lieutenant. Graduates are committed to 61 months' additional military service.

== Cadet Selection ==
The selection process for navy cadets is a long and complex one. Potential Israeli cadets are identified prior to reporting for national service at age 18, based on factors such as high grades in school and top scores on standardized tests, excellent physical condition and high technical aptitude.

All recruits with the appropriate personal indicators then report to the "elite unit day"; a 1-2 day battery of tests which mainly gauge physical effort. Only a select few will proceed from this step to the mental aptitude testing battery, which takes place at the Navy Pavilion in Tel HaShomer. (Women, and men unable to participate in elite unit day because of special circumstances, usually medical, start the selection process directly at this stage). The mental aptitude testing battery consists mainly of mental and psychological tests, and only around 30% of those tested will qualify for the next stage, while those who did not pass are sometimes given an opportunity to try out for other special units within the navy, such as the submarine flotilla.

Those who successfully complete all of the above testing phases are invited to participate in a four-day gibush (cohesion), a selection phase involving physical, mental, and sociometric challenges. Recruits are screened not only for their ability to perform the tasks assigned, but for their attitude in performing them – such as how they take hardships and unexpected difficulties, how well they work in groups and how they approach problem solving and disaster management situations. As many as 80% percent of those who commence the gibush will be dropped from further consideration at its conclusion.

Those who pass the gibush embark on an almost three-year journey to graduation, which includes extensive naval training, infantry training, an officer's course, and studies towards an academic degree (B.A.). The cadets are evaluated constantly, and the vast majority of those who begin their studies in the Naval Academy do not make it through the full program. Those expelled from the course will either remain in the navy as officers in support positions, or transfer to an army unit. This depends to a large degree on the stage at which they leave the course. Most of those expelled qualify for transfer to the Israeli Special Forces.

== Course fields ==
The cadets are divided into areas of expertise, each with corresponding posts after graduation:

- Deck: Instructor, Weapons Officer, Anti-submarine Warfare Officer, Navigation Officer on a missile ship or a submarine, or Patrol Boat Commander;
- Engine: Engineering Officer ("Chief") on a missile ship or submarine;
- Electronics: Electronics Officer or instructor on a missile ship or submarine.

== Course phases ==
=== Initial training ===
Cadets first go through basic infantry training for four weeks at the navy's training base, during which they also learn the IDF's values and Israeli military history.

=== Basic phase ===
This stage lasts about six months and includes the "seamanship and command" phase. During this phase the cadet is first faced with challenges and difficulties at sea, along with a very high level of physical training, and strict discipline. The cadets experience long voyages at sea and are taught about Israel's maritime borders. At the end of this stage, cadets undergo a 72-hour cruise in an Inflatable boat. At the end of the "seamanship and command" phase the cadets return to the navy training base and receive continuing training on the operation and command of larger vessels.

During this phase, the identifying rank markings are dark blue Epaulettes. After completion of the "seamanship and command" phase, a white stripe is added to the Epaulettes. At this point, and during the rest of the course the students wear a beret with a white stripe around the edge, and a white background behind the symbol of the Navy.

=== Advanced phase ===
This stage lasts about six months and differs between the various areas of expertise. The cadets are split up into two different training tracks based on their expected position:

- Deck training – The goal of this stage is primarily to improve the technical performance of the cadets, who are trained in maritime weaponry and the operation of naval vessels.
- Electronics / Engine – The purpose of this phase is to drastically improve the professional level of the cadets, who are given instruction to gain a deeper understanding of naval technology and train to specialize in marine mechanics and systems.

During this phase, the Epaulettes are dark blue with two white stripes.

=== Academic phase ===
This stage lasts about eight months and consists of a customized academic course at the University of Haifa for a B.A. in one of three subjects: Political Science, Information Systems, or Business Administration, combined with lessons about naval and military strategy. Their naval officer training continues in parallel to academic studies.

In the past, the cadets used to go through an undergraduate multidisciplinary curriculum which included: Political Science, Economics, Business Administration, as well as maritime subjects and naval history, but beginning from class 130 (2013), it was upgraded to a unique Political Science degree. In 2024 Information Systems and Business Administration were added as options.

During this phase, the Epaulettes are dark blue with a golden anchor pin.

=== Apprenticeship phase ===
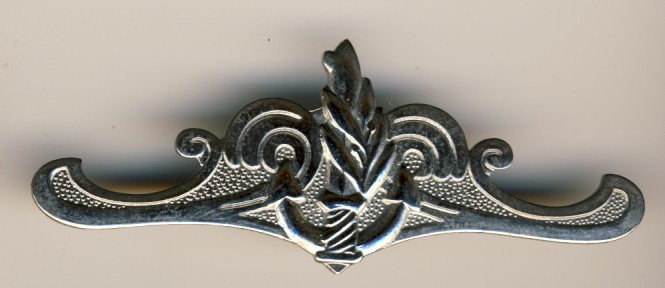
Naval officer pin

This stage lasts about eight months and includes practical and theoretical training in the designated position aboard the ship. During this phase, the Epaulettes are dark blue with a golden anchor pin above a white stripe.

=== Internship phase ===
This stage lasts about four months during which the cadets undergo an internship and operate aboard their designated vessels as vice-officers in their areas of study. During this phase, the Epaulettes are dark blue with a golden anchor pin above two white stripes.

The end of this phase marks the end of the course, after which the graduation ceremony takes place at the navy's training base, where graduates receive the naval officer pin and Lieutenant rank.

== Training during war ==
In cases where Israel goes to war, cadets can be integrated into operational activity. Upon the outbreak Gaza war, class 152, which had started in April 2023, was modified to enable cadets to take part in active military operations as part of their training, providing fire support to Israeli ground forces in Gaza and taking part in attacks against Syria, Yemen, and Iran. The cadets spent 2,500 hours at sea- 60% more than in a peacetime course - and traveled to locations far more distant than ones trainees in peacetime would sail to.

== Work with USNA ==
The United States Naval Academy teams up with their Israeli counterparts on cybersecurity training.
