= Eilat Naval Base =

Israeli Naval base southern Israel

Coordinates: 29.545°N 34.951°E

Eilat Naval Base
- Israel
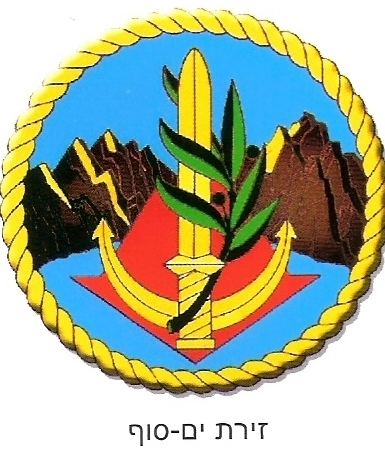
- Logo of the base

Site information
- Type: Naval Base
- Owner: Israel Defense Forces
- Operator: Israeli Navy

Garrison information
- Garrison: Israeli Navy: 915th Squadron; Patrol Unit; Fin Unit

Eilat Naval Base is a major Israeli naval base situated in the Israeli coastal city of Eilat. It was established in 1949 and serves as the sole Israeli Navy base on the coast of the Red Sea.

== Roles ==
The main task of the base in Eilat is to maintain the security and peace of Eilat. The main activity in the city of Eilat is based on recreation and tourism, which include, among other things, about two hundred vessels moving in a relatively small maritime region.

In the past this area was a meeting area between four conflicting countries: Israel, Egypt, Jordan and Saudi Arabia. However, today all the 4 countries are at peace.

At the base operates the Patrol Squadron 915, which operates the Dvora-class fast patrol boats and Super Dvora Mk III-class patrol boats.

Eilat Naval Shipyard is also under the security from the base.

== History ==
=== Establishment ===
The base was established in 1949 after the 1948 Arab-Israeli war to serve as a naval base at the point of junction with three hostile states.

=== Six Day War ===
During the Six-Day War, the base played a vital role in the capture and occupation of Sharm El Sheikh. On 7 June, Israel began its attack on Sharm el-Sheikh. The Israeli Navy started the operation with a probe of Egyptian naval defences. An aerial reconnaissance flight found that the area was less defended than originally thought. At about 4:30 am, three Israeli missile boats opened fire on Egyptian shore batteries, while paratroopers and commandos boarded helicopters and Nord Noratlas transport planes for an assault on Al-Tur, as Chief of Staff Yitzhak Rabin was convinced it was too risky to land them directly in Sharm el-Sheikh. However, the city had been largely abandoned the day before, and reports from air and naval forces finally convinced Rabin to divert the aircraft to Sharm el-Sheikh. There, the Israelis engaged in a pitched battle with the Egyptians and took the city, killing 20 Egyptian soldiers and taking eight more prisoners. At 12:15 pm, Defense Minister Moshe Dayan announced that the Straits of Tiran constituted an international waterway open to all ships without restriction. The entire operation was carried out from this base.

=== Ammunition truck disaster ===
On January 24, 1970, at the Eilat base, a truck loaded with ammunition captured in Operation Rhodes exploded. As a result of the explosion, 24 people were killed, 17 of them on the spot, and seven died of their wounds in the days after the explosion, and dozens were injured.

=== Operation Green light ===
The base was set to co-ordinate the Operation Green Light which was to carry out an amphibious landing on Egyptian Red Sea coast but the operation was aborted mid way.

=== Gaesh rescue mission ===
In 1981, the shipyard repaired the hull of INS Gaesh, after the unwanted beaching on the Saudi Arabian coast. The activity included salvage and refloating from the Saudi coast, towing to the Eilat Naval Base, shipping and repair to an operational condition.

=== Evacuation plans ===
From the late 1990s, discussions began on the evacuation of the naval base in Eilat, in favor of the establishment of tourist projects and the further development of the Eilat beach strip towards the south. However, the realization of the project did not come to fruition for many years. In 1996, the Ministry of Defense and the Navy Headquarters decided to close the Navy shipyard in Eilat. In the area of the shipyard, planning has begun for the establishment of tourist projects. But in May 1997, the Minister of Defense, Yitzhak Mordechai, decided not to close the base.

At the end of 2002, a plan was drafted according to which the Ports Authority will manage a project that includes the expansion of the Eilat port and the relocation of the Eilat base into it. In March 2003, the Israel Defense Forces (IDF), the Ports Authority and the Eilat Municipality agreed that the Navy base would be moved to Eilat Port and the area would be available for development. But the project did not go ahead, due to a dispute over the financing of the plan.

=== Operation Full Disclosure ===
Operation Full Disclosure was a military operation carried out by the IDF on March 5, 2014, in the Red Sea. After days of surveillance far out to sea, Israeli Navy Shayetet 13 commandos seized the Iranian-owned and Panamanian-registered merchant vessel Klos C that had set sail from Iran, heading for Port Sudan via Iraq. On board, the commandos found long-range missiles suspected to be destined for the Gaza Strip concealed in containers full of Iranian bags marked as Portland cement. The operation was carried out from this base.

=== Red Sea crisis ===
The Red Sea crisis began on 17 October 2023. On 27 October 2023 two loitering munitions were fired by Houthi militants in a northerly direction from the southern Red Sea. According to IDF officials, their target was Israel, but they did not cross the border from Egypt. Of the two drones, one fell short and hit a building adjacent to a hospital in Taba, Egypt, injuring six; the other was shot down near an electricity plant close to the town of Nuweiba, Egypt. A Houthi official later made a one-word post on Twitter after the drone crashed in Taba, mentioning Eilat.

On 31 October an alert was triggered in Eilat, Eilot kibbutz and the Shahorit industrial park area regarding the penetration of hostile aircraft from the Red Sea. The aircraft was successfully intercepted over the Red Sea. The Arrow system intercepted a ballistic missile and the Israeli Air Force intercepted several cruise missiles fired from the Red Sea toward Eilat. The Houthis took responsibility for the launches.

On 1 November at 00:45 the IDF intercepted an air threat fired from Yemen and identified south of Eilat. On 9 November, the Houthis fired a missile toward the city of Eilat. On 14 November the Houthis fired numerous missiles, one of which was aimed toward the city of Eilat. The missile was intercepted by an Arrow missile according to Israeli officials. On 22 November, the Houthis fired a cruise missile aimed toward the city of Eilat. Israeli officials said the missile was successfully intercepted.

On 6 December 2023, the Houthi movement launched several ballistic missiles at Israeli military posts in Eilat including this base. By 21 December, the Port of Eilat, which gives Israel via the Red Sea its only easy shipping access to Asia without the need to transit the Suez Canal, had seen an 85% drop in activity due to the Houthi action.

On 2 February 2024, the Houthis claimed that they had fired a ballistic missile towards Eilat. The IDF also said that the Arrow defense system intercepted a missile over the Red Sea.

On 18 March, Yemeni Houthis launched a cruise missile that successfully struck Israel, reportedly hitting an open area north of Eilat. Israel stated there was no damage or injuries caused. On 21 March, IDF also announced on the same day that it intercepted a "suspicious aerial target" approaching Israeli territory over the Red Sea.

On 9 April, the IDF used a seaborne missile from INS Magen to shoot down a unmanned aerial vehicle (UAV) for the first time. The UAV, which came from the Red Sea, breached Israeli airspace and crossed into the area of the Gulf of Aqaba, setting off sirens in Eilat.

On 3 June, the IDF's Arrow defense system intercepted a surface-to-air missile aimed at Eilat from the direction of the Red Sea.

=== IRI attacks ===
On 3 November 2023 Islamic Resistance in Iraq (IRI) claimed responsibility for a missile attack on Eilat. On 12 November the IRI claimed responsibility for a missile attack on Eilat.

On 31 December the IRI claimed a drone attack on Eilat.

On 28 January 2024 the IRI claimed a drone attack on Eilat.

On 1 April 2024, the IRI claimed responsibility for a drone attack on Eilat. The drone struck the base causing damage to a building and no casualties. Multiple strikes were reported on 9 April, 20 April, 7 May, 20 May, 23 May, and 27 May.

=== 2024 Iran-Israel conflict ===
During the 2024 Iran-Israel conflict, the base was put at high alert and Shayetet 3 ships were stationed there, which neutralized some aerial threats during the April 2024 Iranian strikes on Israel.

== 915th Patrol Squadron ==
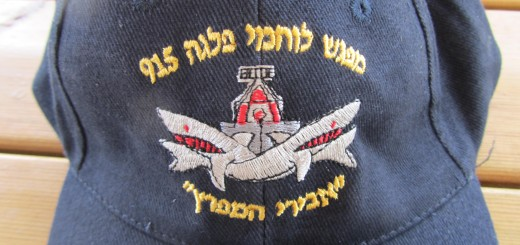
Cap with Insignia of the 915th Squadron

The squadron 915 is divided into two units, the vessel fighters, who make up the bulk of the force, and the fin fighters.

=== Vessel fighters ===
Objectives of vessel fighters are

- Constant patrols in the seas of Israel.
- Identification of watercraft entering Israeli waters.
- Preventing smuggling through the sea
- Protecting national assets, such as drilling rigs.
- Various operations carried out alone, or with other units in and outside of the navy.

=== Fin fighters ===
The objective of Fin fighters is the security of the base.

== Commanders ==
The commanders of the base'
Name	term of office	Remarks	Image
Abraham Luxemburg	1949–1950		
Unknown	1950–1952		
Yosef Almog	1952–1955		
Unknown	1955–1957		
Yehuda Ben-Zur	1957–1958	Chinese evaluation	
Jacob Hamel	1958		
Arya Barak	1958–1959		
Jacob Etzion	1959–1960		
Menachem Cohen	1960–1962		
Yaakov Ritov	December 1962 – 1964		
Lt. Col. Menashe Lifshitz	1964–1967	transferred from his command due to a complaint by the people of Eilat about the transfer of the families of the base staff during the war.	
Avraham Butzer	during the period of Six Day War	The liberation of Sharm al-Sheikh	
Yaakov Gilad	August 1967 to August 1968		
Ezra Kedem	1970–1972		
Solomon beautiful	1972–1973		
Zvi Paz	1973–1974		
Ephraim Sela	from the beginning of 1974 to the end of 1975	Exchange of boats in barterams with beavers, rescuing a tourist on a boat that drifted to Aqaba carried out by a beaver	
Moshe Oron	September 1981–September 1982		
Ami Sarel	September 1982-May 1985		
Udi Aral	May 1985–August 1988		
Dodu Hayver	August 1988-May 1989		
Yossi Israel	May 1989-July 1991		
Aryeh Gabish	July 1991-July 1992		
Udi Dvir	July 1992-July 1994		
Shloma Cohen	July 1994–June 1996		
Shlomo Frommer	July 1996-June 1998		
Ofer Dubnov	June 1998–October 2001		
Yehuda Siso	October 2001–September 2002	Seizure of drug boats	
Yossi Shachaf	September 2002-September 2006		
Lieutenant Colonel Oren Guter	September 2006-August 2007		
Chen Tal	August 2007-August 2008		
David Sa'ar Selma	August 2008–February 2010		
Lt. Col. Zvi Shahar	February 2010-August 2012		
Lieutenant Colonel Ilan Mintz	August 2012 – 2015		
Oren Nahabs	2015-2017		
Ofir David	2019-2017		
Tamir Shemesh	2017- July 2021		
Lt. Col. Shay Khudara	June 2021–		

== Sources & References ==
- Zeev Fried, חיל הים כובש את מפרץ אילת, "Marine Systems" 11, December 1956, p. 54.
- Orly Azoulai, בסיס אילת פנים רבות לו, 'Marine Systems' 111, March 1973, p. 30.
- Batia Shem-El, מפגש אמנים בבסיס אילת, 'Between Waves', April 1974 p. 32.
- Giorgio concocted, שומרים על השקט בבריכה, 'Between Waves' 164 February 1985, p. 21.
- Aryeh Tal, ביקור ספינות נאטו בסיס אילת, "Between Waves", 8, May 2005 p. 10.
- sapphire paid, זירת ים סוף למען הסביבה, "Between Waves", May 2017, p. 16.
- Oren, Michael B. (2002). Six Days of War: June 1967 and the Making of the Modern Middle East. Oxford University Press. ISBN 978-0-19-515174-9.
- Oren, Michael B. (2002e). Six Days of War: June 1967 and the Making of the Modern Middle East (electronic ed.). New York: RosettaBooks. ISBN 978-0-79-532684-4.
