= Naval Intelligence Division (Israel) =

Staff unit in the Israeli navy headquarters

The Israeli Naval Intelligence Division (NID) is a staff unit in the Israeli navy headquarters. Like other IDF intelligence bodies, it is professionally subordinate to the Intelligence Directorate.

The NID is responsible for providing the Corps and the IDF at large with the naval intelligence picture, as part of the Intelligence Community. It provides warning of war or terrorism from the sea; instructs and trains the Navy on areas related to field intelligence, intelligence-related human resources, and hydrography; and coordinates between the Navy and other elements in the Intelligence Community.

== See also ==
- Intelligence Directorate of the Main Staff of the Russian Navy
