= Atlit naval base =

Military base of Israeli forces

Coordinates: 32°42′19″N 34°56′02″E

Altit Naval Base
- Israel
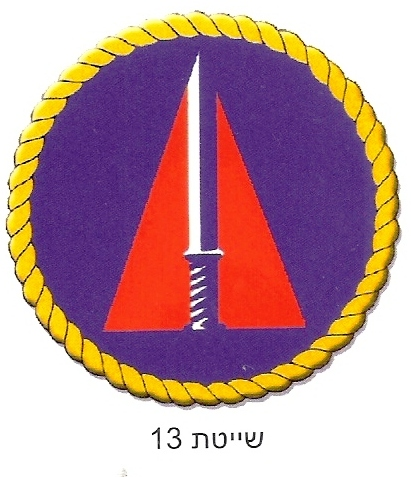
- Coat of Arms of the base

Site information
- Type: Naval Base
- Owner: Israel Defense Forces
- Operator: Israeli Navy

Garrison information
- Garrison: Israeli Navy: Shayetet 13

Atlit naval base is a classified Israeli Navy base on the northern Mediterranean coast of Israel. The base is home to Shayetet 13, Israel's naval commando unit.

In 2010, Israeli prime minister Benjamin Netanyahu visited the base to salute the commandos who took part in the Gaza flotilla raid. During the Operation Arrows of the North, Hezbollah claimed that its drone squadron successfully struck the Atlit base.

== Atlit Shipyard ==
Atlit Shipyard, a part of the Naval Shipyards (Israel) is also in the parameter of the base.

=== Establishment ===
After the establishment of Shayetet 13, the research and planning division of the Weapons Development Authority, began a project based on sabotage boats that were manufactured in Italy and which were used to sink Emir Farooq. A new model passed the tests in Shipyard until March 1954 and in April of that year it was tested by the Navy and its production began. In 1956 the boats entered operational use in the Navy.

=== Integration into Naval Shipyards ===
After the integration of Shayetet 13 into the Navy, the Shayetet 13 shipyard was subordinated to the Naval Shipyard.

=== Covert Operations ===
Covert repairs and operations were also carried out in this shipyard.

== Château Pèlerin ==
Within the base stands Château Pèlerin, a medieval crusader fortress currently closed to the public.

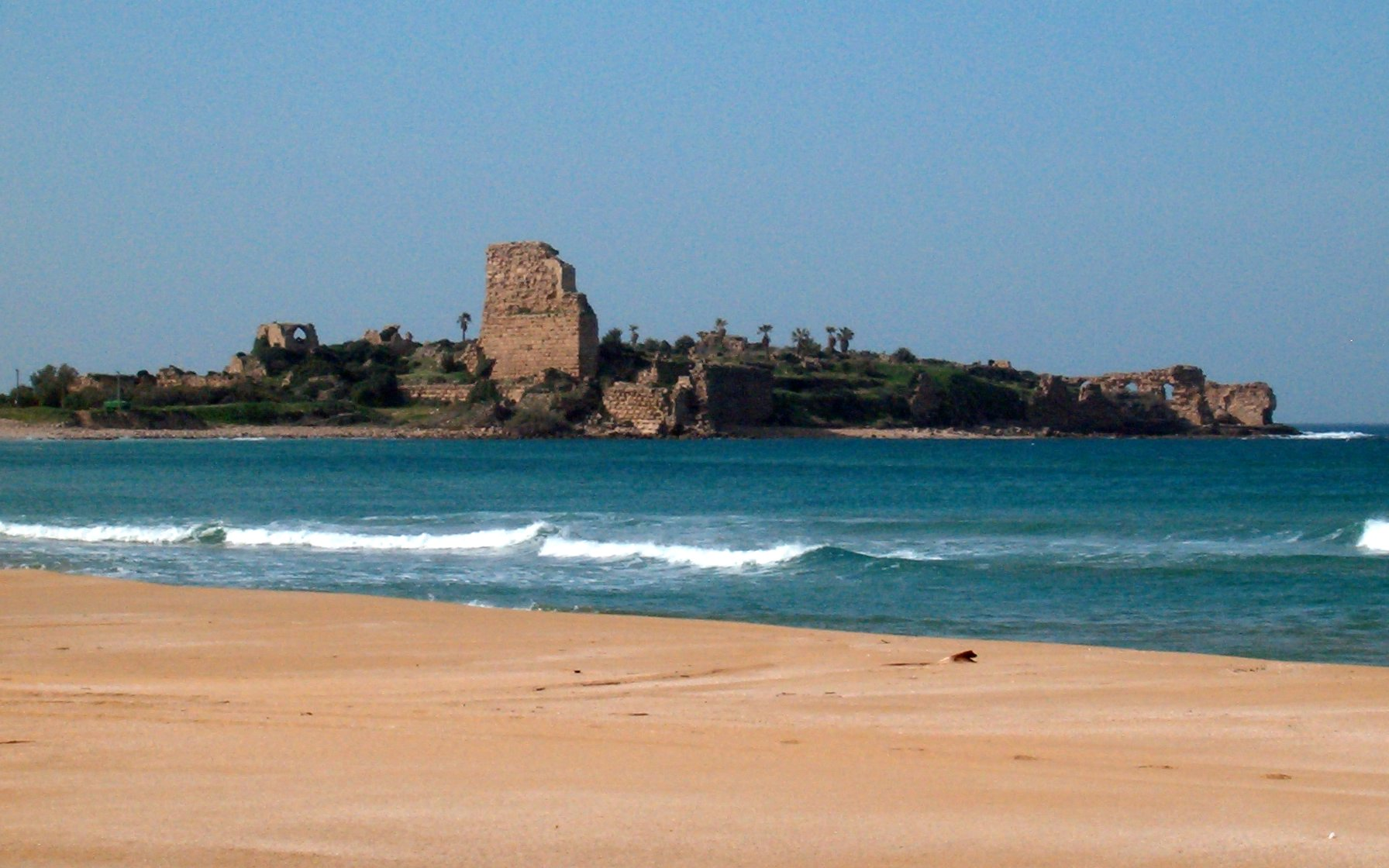
Château Pèlerin, on the grounds of the Atlit naval base

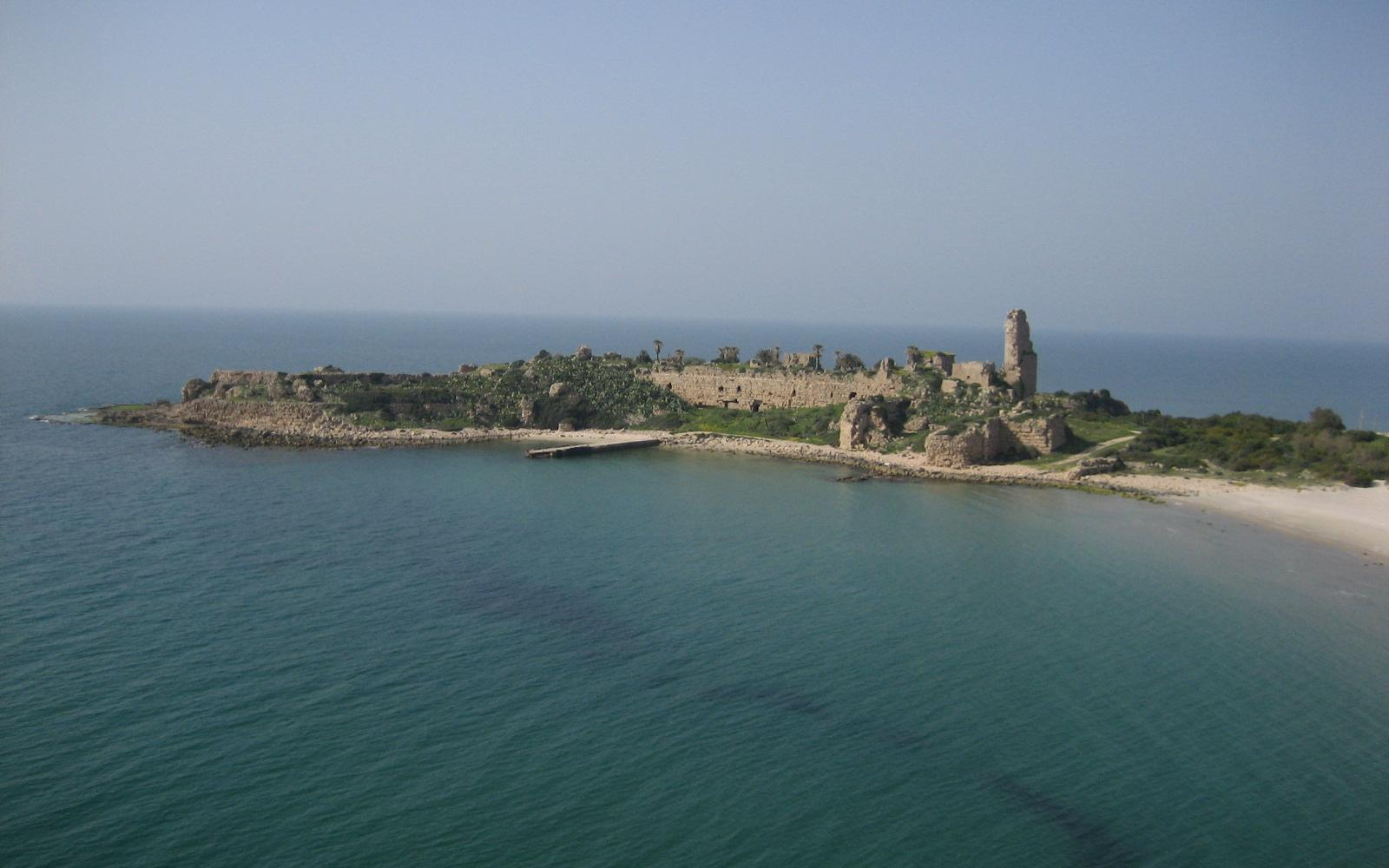
Another view of Château Pèlerin

== See also ==
- Atlit
- Atlit detainee camp
