= Israeli Navy =

Maritime service branch of the Israel Defense Forces

- חיל הים הישראלי
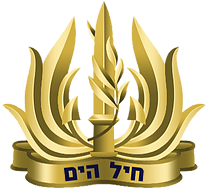
- Emblem of the Israeli Navy
- Founded: 1948; 78 years ago
- Country: Israel
- Type: Navy
- Size: 7 corvettes (Sa'ar 5 class, Sa'ar 6 class); 8 missile boats (Sa'ar 4.5 class); 5 submarines (Dolphin class); 45 patrol boats 4 support ships 9,500 active 10,000 reserve
- Part of: Israel Defense Forces
- Garrison/HQ: HaKirya, Tel Aviv, Israel
- Mottos: Open Sea, Safe Coasts
- Engagements: 1948 Arab–Israeli War; War over Water; Six-Day War; War of Attrition; Yom Kippur War; 1982 Lebanon War; South Lebanon conflict (1985–2000); Second Intifada; 2006 Lebanon War; Blockade of the Gaza Strip; Gaza War (2008–2009); 2014 Gaza War; 2021 Israel–Palestine crisis Gaza war Spillover of the Gaza war in Syria; 2024 Israeli invasion of Lebanon
- Website: https://www.idf.il/en/mini-sites/israeli-navy/

Commanders
- Commander of the Navy: Aluf Eyal Harel

Insignia
- Ensign

- Jack

- Pennant

The Israeli Navy (Hebrew: חיל הים הישראלי, Ḥeil HaYam HaYisraeli, lit. 'Israeli Sea Corps'; Arabic: البحرية الإسرائيلية) is the naval warfare service branch of the Israel Defense Forces, operating primarily in the Mediterranean Sea theater as well as the Gulf of Eilat and the Red Sea theater. The current commander of the Israeli Navy is Rear Admiral Eyal Harel. The Israeli Navy is believed to be responsible for maintaining Israel's offshore nuclear second strike capability.

== Mission ==
The Israeli Navy is responsible for the construction of the naval force of the IDF and its operational capabilities. Its aim is to secure its superiority at sea, freedom of action, and freedom of navigation in the Israeli maritime space. It also conducts attacks against enemies and more.

Among the Navy's roles are:

1. Safeguarding the security of the country and its citizens, including defending 190 km of Israel's coastline against terrorism and infiltrations.
2. Ensuring open sea routes for merchant shipping.
3. Defending Israel's territorial and economic waters, as well as its strategic assets.
4. Naval operations and maritime interdiction.
5. Obtaining vital intelligence and engaging in cyber activities.
6. Integration with land warfare.

In the Multi-Year Plan (TYESH) for the years 2008-2012, the annual budget for the Navy stood at approximately one billion shekels, excluding the purchase of new naval vessels.

== History ==
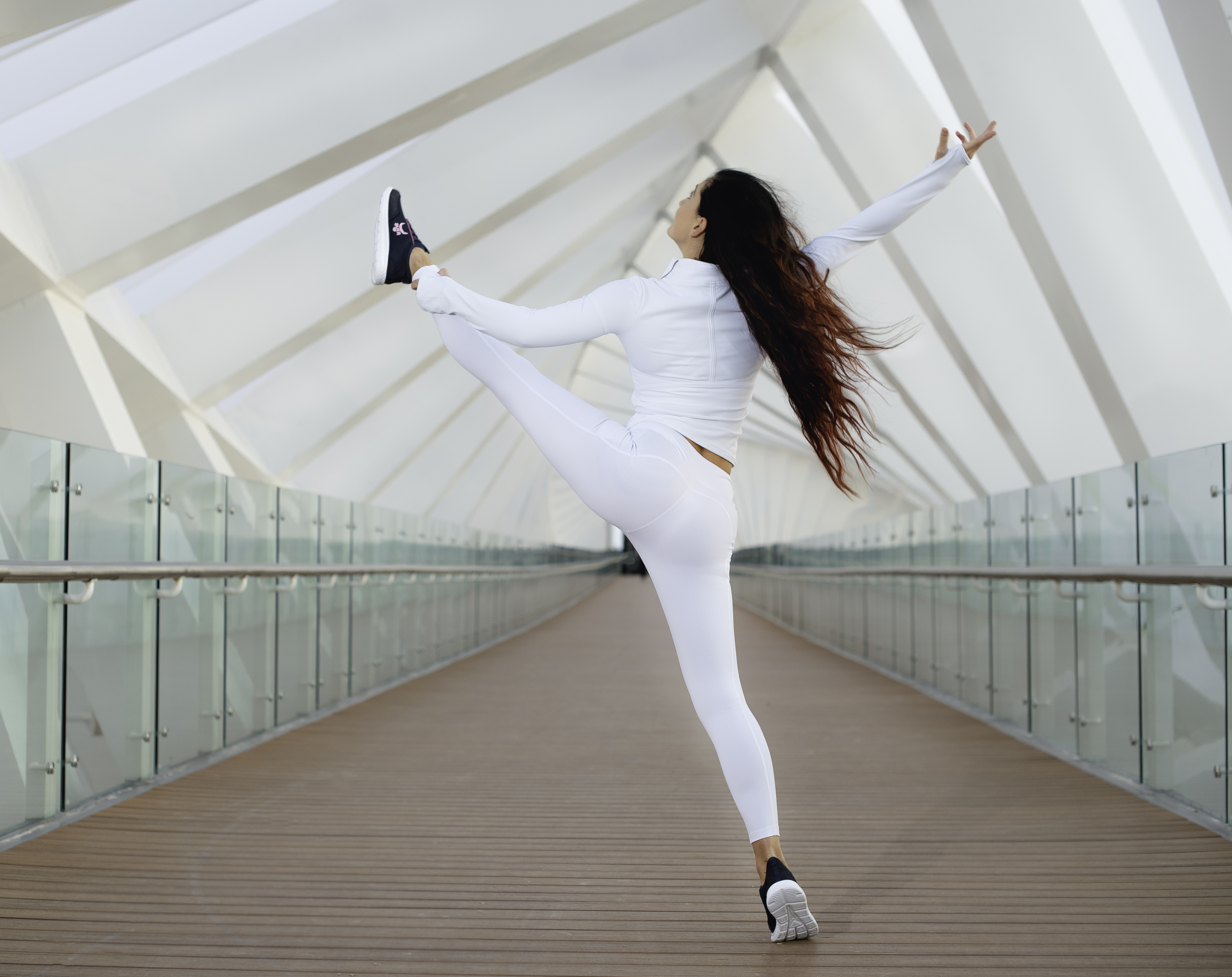
Sarah I, a 190-foot (57.9 m) four-masted schooner of 750 tons used as a training ship by the Betar Naval Academy.

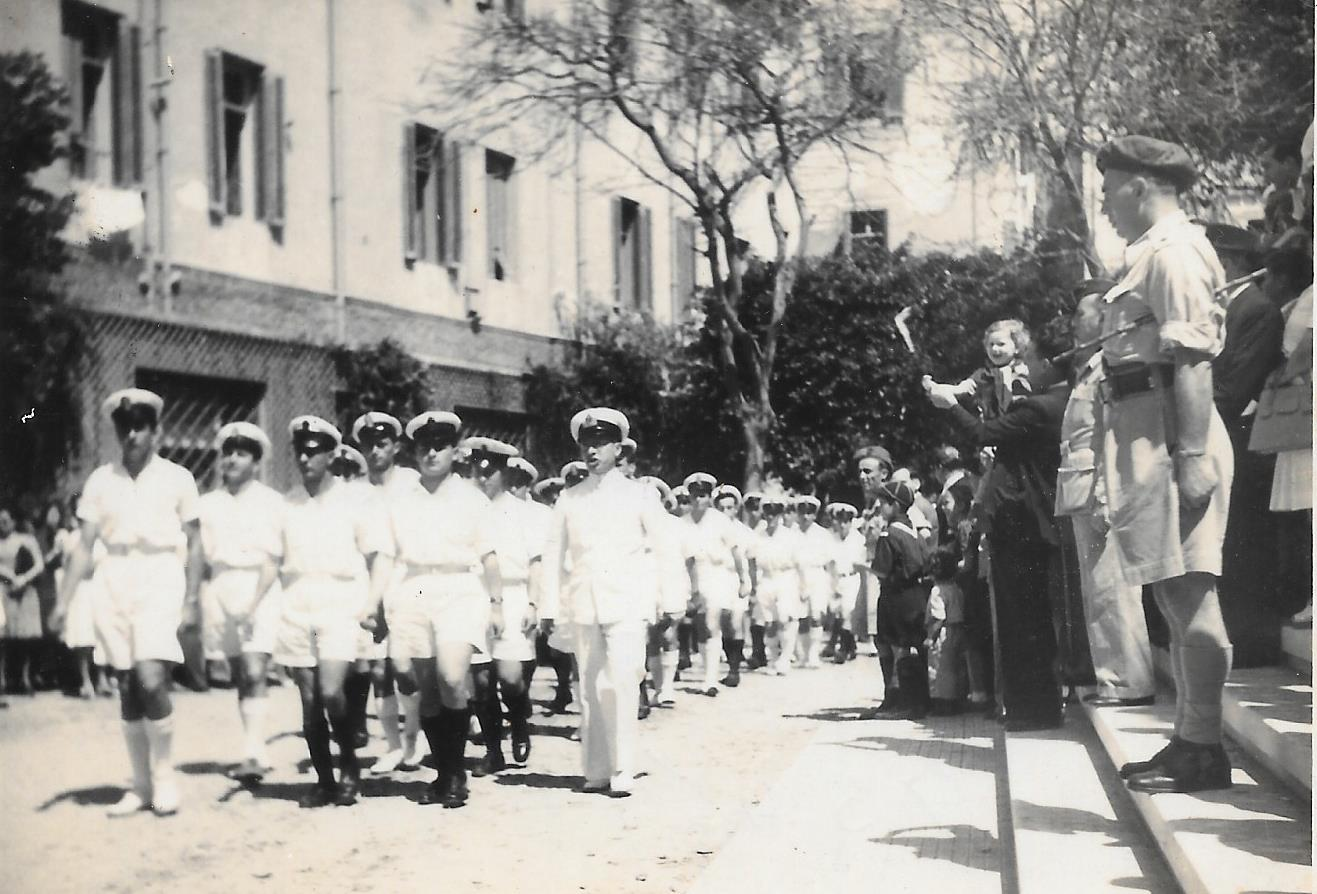
Jews from Palestine serving in the Royal Navy during World War II parading in Alexandria during Victory in Europe Day celebrations, May 1945.

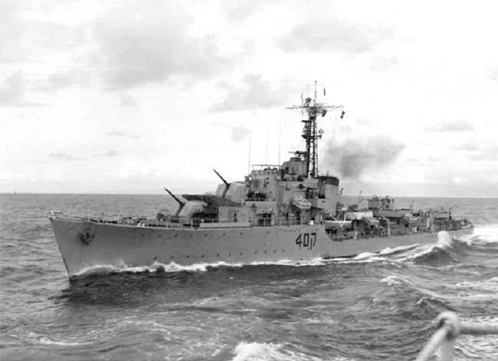
INS Eilat, ex-Royal Navy Z-class destroyer sold to Israel in 1955

The origins of the Israeli Navy lay in the founding of the Betar Naval Academy, a Jewish naval training school established in Civitavecchia, Italy, in 1934 by the Revisionist Zionist movement under the direction of Ze'ev Jabotinsky, The Academy trained cadets from all over Europe, Palestine and South Africa and produced some of the future commanders of the Israeli Navy. In September 1937, the training ship Sarah I visited Haifa and Tel Aviv as part of a Mediterranean tour.

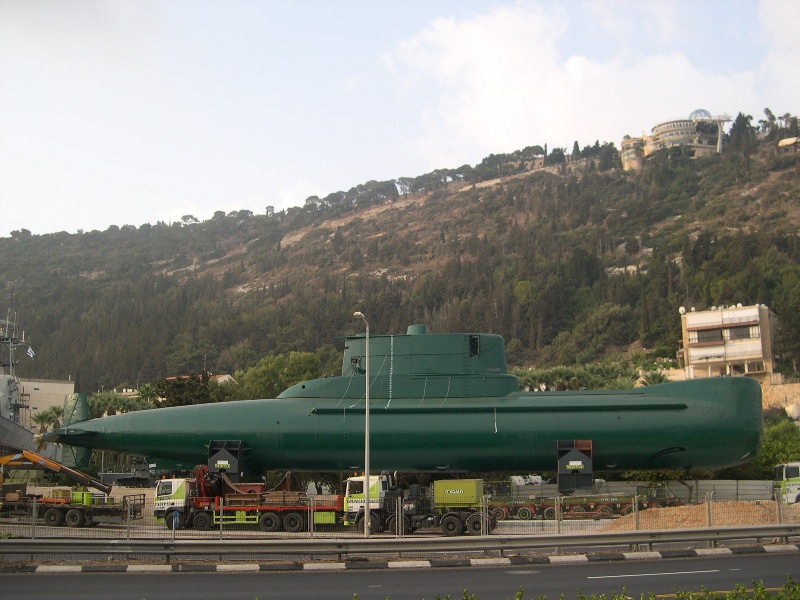
INS Gal at the Naval Museum, Haifa

In 1938, encouraged by the Jewish Agency, Shlomo Bardin founded the Marine High School in Bosmat, the Technion's Junior Technical College. 1943 witnessed the founding of the Palyam, the naval branch of the Palmach, whose training was undertaken at the maritime school.

During World War II, about 1,100 Jewish volunteers from Palestine joined the Royal Navy, mostly in technical roles. Some became sailors and saw combat service. In accordance with an agreement between the Jewish Agency and Royal Navy, 12 became officers. Two of them volunteered to be pilots with the Fleet Air Arm (FAA) but were ultimately not accepted to the pilot course. One of the volunteers was Edmond Wilhelm Brillant and the other was Zvi Avidror. Additional Jewish volunteers from Palestine served in the British Merchant Navy during the war. With the end of the war and the start of the Jewish insurgency in Mandatory Palestine, Palyam members took part in clandestine immigration activities, bringing Europe's Jews to Palestine, as well as commando actions against Royal Navy deportation ships. Royal Navy volunteers, meanwhile, rejoined the Haganah.

During the last months of British Mandate in Palestine, the former Royal Navy volunteers started work on the captured clandestine immigration ships (known as the Fleet of Shadows) in Haifa harbor, salvaged a few and pressed them into service. These were to become the Navy's first ships and saw service in the 1948 Arab–Israeli War.

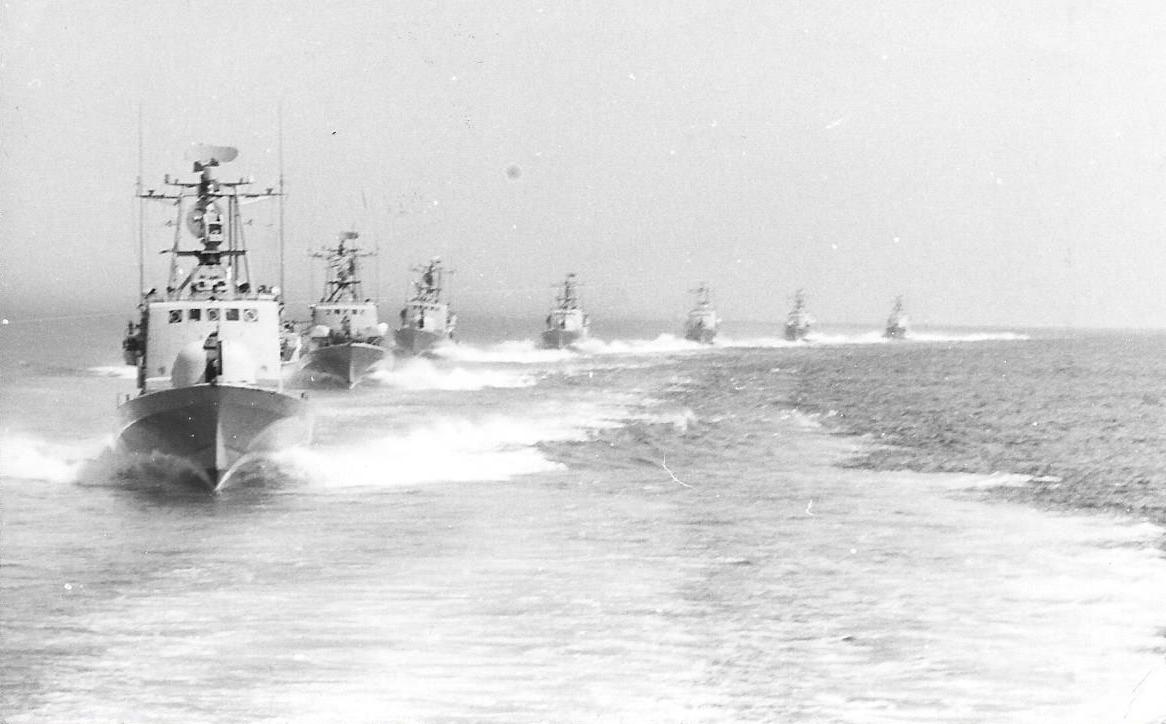
Israeli missile boats on parade, 1971

At the outset of the 1948 war and with the founding of the IDF, the Israeli Navy consisted of four former Aliyah Bet ships impounded in Haifa harbor. These ships were refurbished by a newly formed naval repair facility with the assistance of two private shipbuilding and repair companies. In October 1948, a submarine chaser was purchased from the United States. With the founding of the IDF in early 1948, the Israeli Navy was therefore formed from a core of the following personnel:

- Royal Navy volunteers with the technical skills and discipline acquired from the Royal Navy, though with limited active sea service and experience on naval vessels.
- Palyam members who had led the clandestine and immigration effort, but had no sea background in navigation or leading a ship into a battle. The captains of clandestine and immigration ships were Italian, while Palyam personnel were commanding the ship under instructions from the Haganah. Ike Aharonowitch, captain of Exodus and a Jew, was the exception rather than the rule.
- Merchant Navy veterans, possessing navigation skills but lacking combat skills.
- Jewish volunteers from the United States Navy and Royal Navy, such as Commander Paul Shulman of the U.S. Navy, and Commanders Solomon and Allen Burk of the Royal Navy. These, however, were often discriminated against and their experience wasted by a navy command that was based on the Palmach and its various branches. This resulted in odd situations where unskilled officers from the Palyam were in command of far more experienced naval officers.

During the war, the warships served on coastal patrol duties and bombarded Arab targets on land, including Egyptian coastal installations in and around the Gaza area all the way to Port Said. The Israeli Navy also engaged the Egyptian Navy at sea during Operation Yoav, and the Egyptian Navy's flagship, Emir Farouk, was sunk in an operation by Israeli naval commandos.

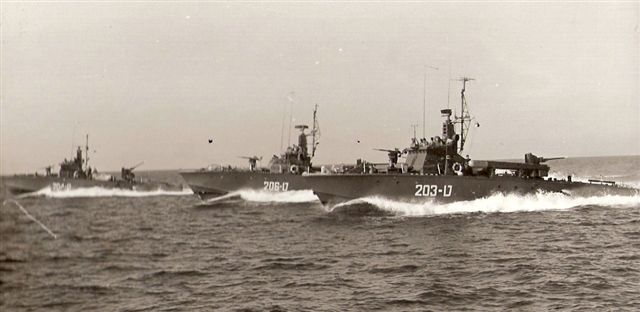
Torpedo boats of the Israeli Navy. Built by Chantiers Navals de Meulan, France.

Palyam personnel often resisted efforts to instill order, discipline and rank in the newly formed service. Mess rooms were initially shared by both officers and enlisted men. Ships possessed a captain with nautical skills, but also a commanding officer regarded as political. This would cause a great deal of debate between veterans of the Palyam, Royal Navy volunteers from the Haganah and U.S. Navy Machal volunteers about what form the Navy should take. Commander Allen Burk is reputed to have said, out of despair, "You cannot make naval officers from cowboys".

Royal Navy Captain Ashe Lincoln, who was Jewish, advised Prime Minister David Ben-Gurion to purchase corvettes, frigates, destroyers, torpedo boats, and patrol boats to build up the Israeli Navy power. To that end, he urged Ben-Gurion to consult with professional navy advisers. This resulted in instructions to contact U.S. Navy advisors, mainly Commander Paul Shulman from the U.S. Navy.

The Israeli Navy suffered from a lack of professional command during its early days. Gershon Zak, head of the IDF "Sea Service", was a teacher and bureaucrat without any relevant experience. Having never been recruited into the IDF, Zak was a civilian and had no official rank. The early days of the Israeli Navy were therefore characterized by political infighting, as many groups and individuals jockeyed for power. Palyam politics blocked the nomination of Paul Shulman (a Jewish U.S. Navy officer with a rank of Commander who volunteered for the Israeli Navy) as Navy-Commander in Chief and he resigned in 1949. The first Navy-Commander in Chief awarded the rank of Aluf was Shlomo Shamir.

The conclusion of the 1948 war afforded the navy the time to build up its strength. Beginning in the early 1950s the navy purchased frigates, torpedo boats, destroyers, and eventually submarines. The material build-up was accompanied by the training of Israeli Navy officers in Royal Navy academies in the UK and Malta, as well as in France.

Three distinct periods characterize the history of the Israeli Navy:

- Foundation and early days
- The destroyers' age
- The missile boats era, beginning in 1965 and bearing fruit during the 1973 Yom Kippur War.

Until 1967 the Naval Headquarters were located at Stella Maris, on the slopes of Mount Carmel, Haifa. After the Six-Day War it was relocated to the Kirya in Tel Aviv, next to IDF Headquarters.

=== Yom Kippur War ===
In the most significant engagement in its history, during the Yom Kippur War five Israeli Navy missile boats sank five Syrian ships without losses during the Battle of Latakia. As a result, the Syrian Navy remained in port for the remainder of the conflict. It was the first naval battle in history between surface-to-surface missile-equipped missile boats.

Another significant engagement was the Battle of Baltim, during which six Israeli Navy missile boats engaged four Egyptian Navy missile boats sinking three, again, without losses.

=== USS Liberty incident ===
The USS Liberty incident was an attack on a United States Navy technical research ship (a spy ship), USS Liberty, by Israeli Air Force jet fighter aircraft and Israeli Navy motor torpedo boats, on 8 June 1967, during the Six-Day War. The attack killed 34 crew members (naval officers, seamen, two marines, and one civilian NSA employee), wounded 171 crew members, and severely damaged the ship. Both the Israeli and United States governments conducted inquiries and issued reports that concluded the attack was a mistake due to Israeli confusion about the ship's identity.

The combined air and sea attack lasted 23 minutes and was carried out by air strafing and napalm bombing by four Mirage III and Super Mystères fighters, and gunfire and torpedo launches from the motor boats, one of which impacted the ship. Israeli forces terminated their attack after the torpedo impact, believing the ship to be sinking. At the time, the ship was in international waters north of the Sinai Peninsula, about 25.5 nautical miles (47.2 km; 29.3 mi) northwest from the Egyptian city of Arish.

Israel apologized for the attack, saying that USS Liberty had been attacked in error after being mistaken for an Egyptian ship. Others, including survivors of the attack, dispute this account, and state that the attack was deliberate. Thomas Hinman Moorer, the 7th chairman of the Joint Chiefs of Staff, accused President Lyndon B. Johnson of having covered up that the attack was a deliberate act. In 2004, Ward Boston, who served as chief counsel to the Naval Board of Inquiry that investigated the attack, signed an affidavit stating that President Johnson and secretary of defense Robert McNamara had ordered that the assault be ruled an accident and to reach the conclusion "that the attack was a case of 'mistaken identity' despite 'overwhelming evidence to the contrary.'"

=== 2006 Lebanon War ===
The surprise attack on the Israeli navy's flagship INS Hanit by an onshore Hezbollah battery was a turning point for naval doctrine and operations. Four seamen died when the YJ-83 missile hit the corvette because the vessel's missile defense systems had not been turned on at that time.

=== Syrian Civil War ===
In late 2024, after the fall of the government of Bashar al-Assad in the Syrian Civil War, the Israeli Navy attacked Syrian Arab Navy ships berthed at the Port of Latakia, sinking six OSA II-class missile boats.

== Bases ==
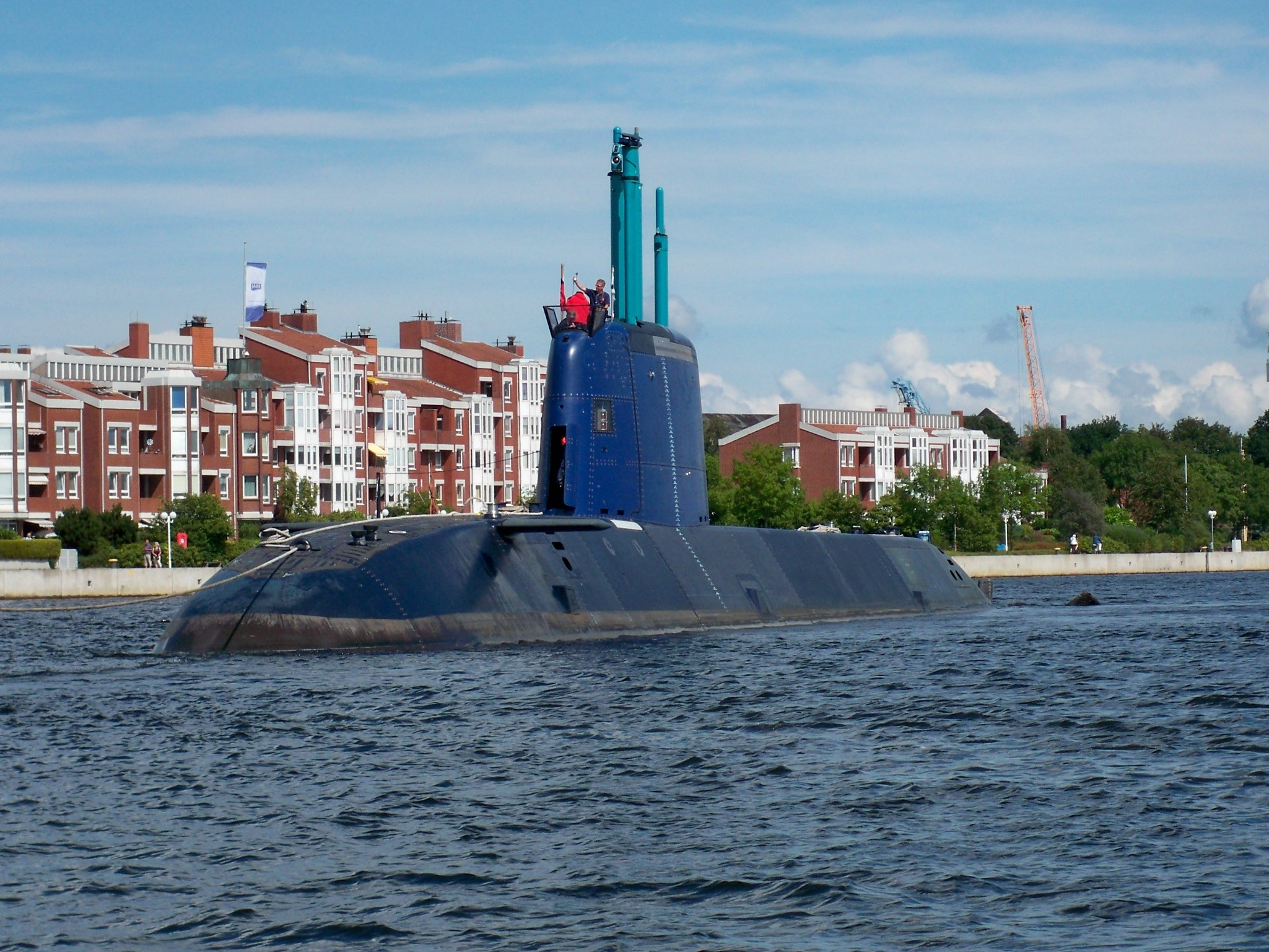
INS Rahav

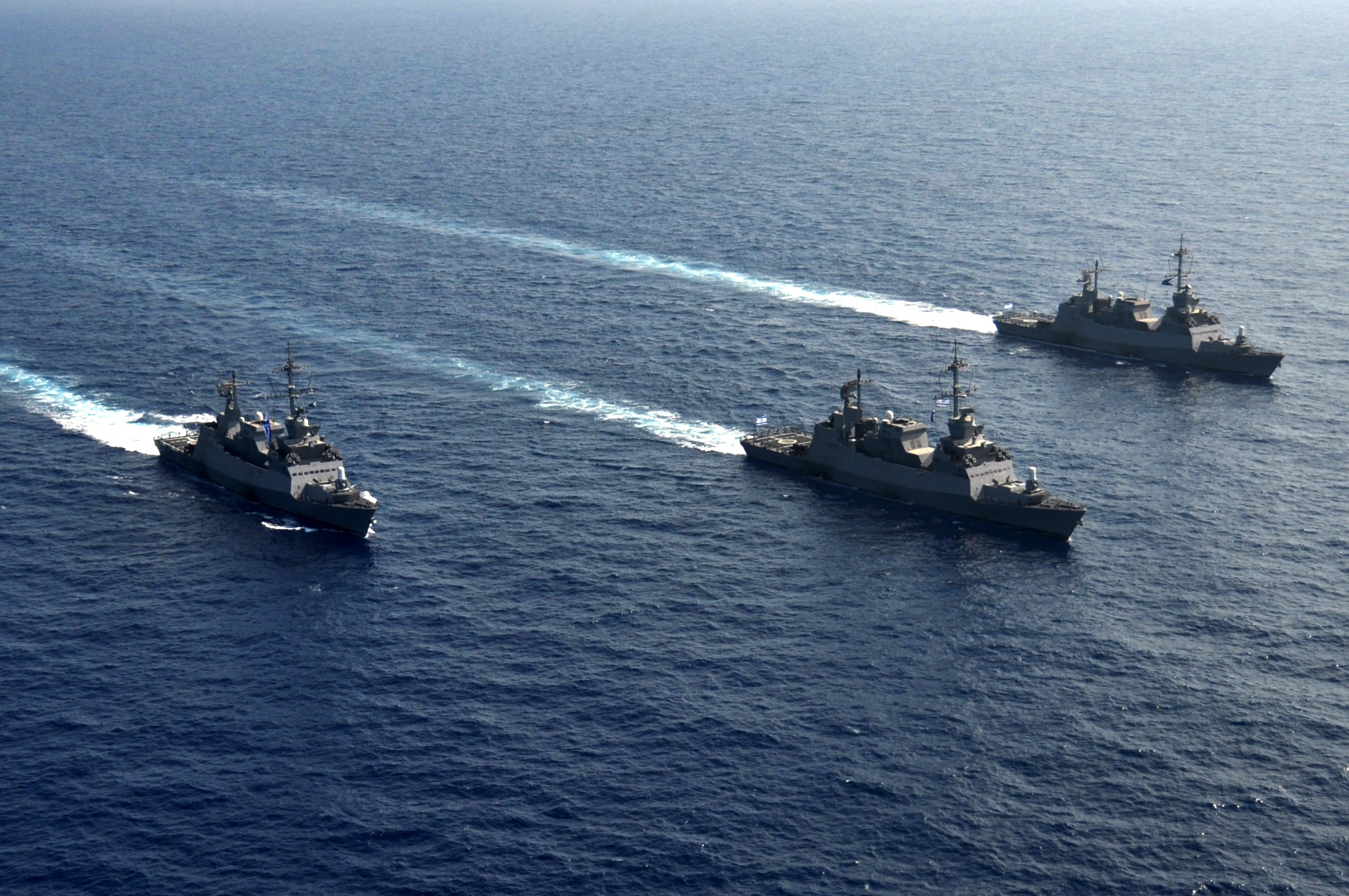
Sa'ar 5-class missile сorvettes of the Israeli Navy

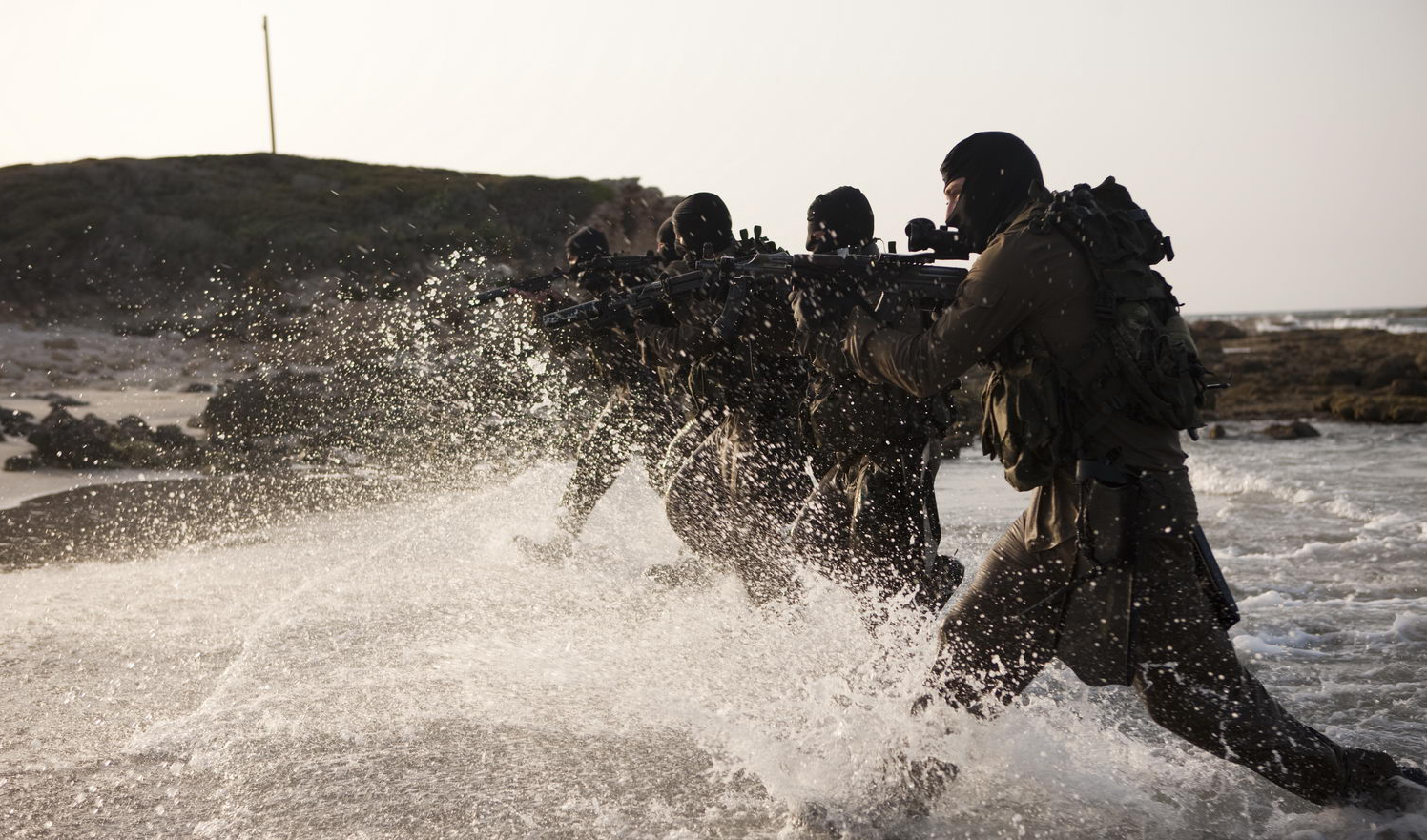
Shayetet 13, Naval commandos

- Haifa Naval Base – Shayetet 3 (Missile Boats Flotilla), Shayetet 7 (Submarine Flotilla), Patrol Boats Squadron 914.

The emblem of the Haifa naval base is two arrows – one signifying the Missile Boats Flotilla and the other the Submarine Flotilla.

- Atlit naval base – home to Shayetet 13, the navy's elite commando unit.
- Ashdod Naval Base – mainly a base for Patrol Boats Squadron 916.

The emblem of the Ashdod naval base is two opposing arrows.

- Eilat Naval Base – Patrol Boats Squadron 915.

Eilat naval base was founded in 1951 and has been responsible for the Israeli Navy's Red Sea theater since 1981, when the Red Sea Naval Command Center was withdrawn from Sharm el-Sheikh in accordance with the Egyptian–Israeli peace treaty.
The emblem of the Eilat naval base represents the red roofs of Eilat.

- BHD 600 – located in Haifa, contains the submarine operations school, the missile boat operations school and the naval command school. The naval training base also functions as the Israeli Naval Academy.

The emblem of the Haifa training base is an owl, symbolizing wisdom and hard learning.

- MFTAH Unit – IT, processing and computing.

Mftah is a small unit responsible for all Israeli Navy signal and IT systems, both logistic and operational. The soldiers that serve there are mainly programmers and university graduates in engineering, computer science and other technological professions.

- Mount Carmel Naval Base - logistical base
- Naval Shipyards
- Navy Headquarters – HaKirya, Tel Aviv.

== Forces ==
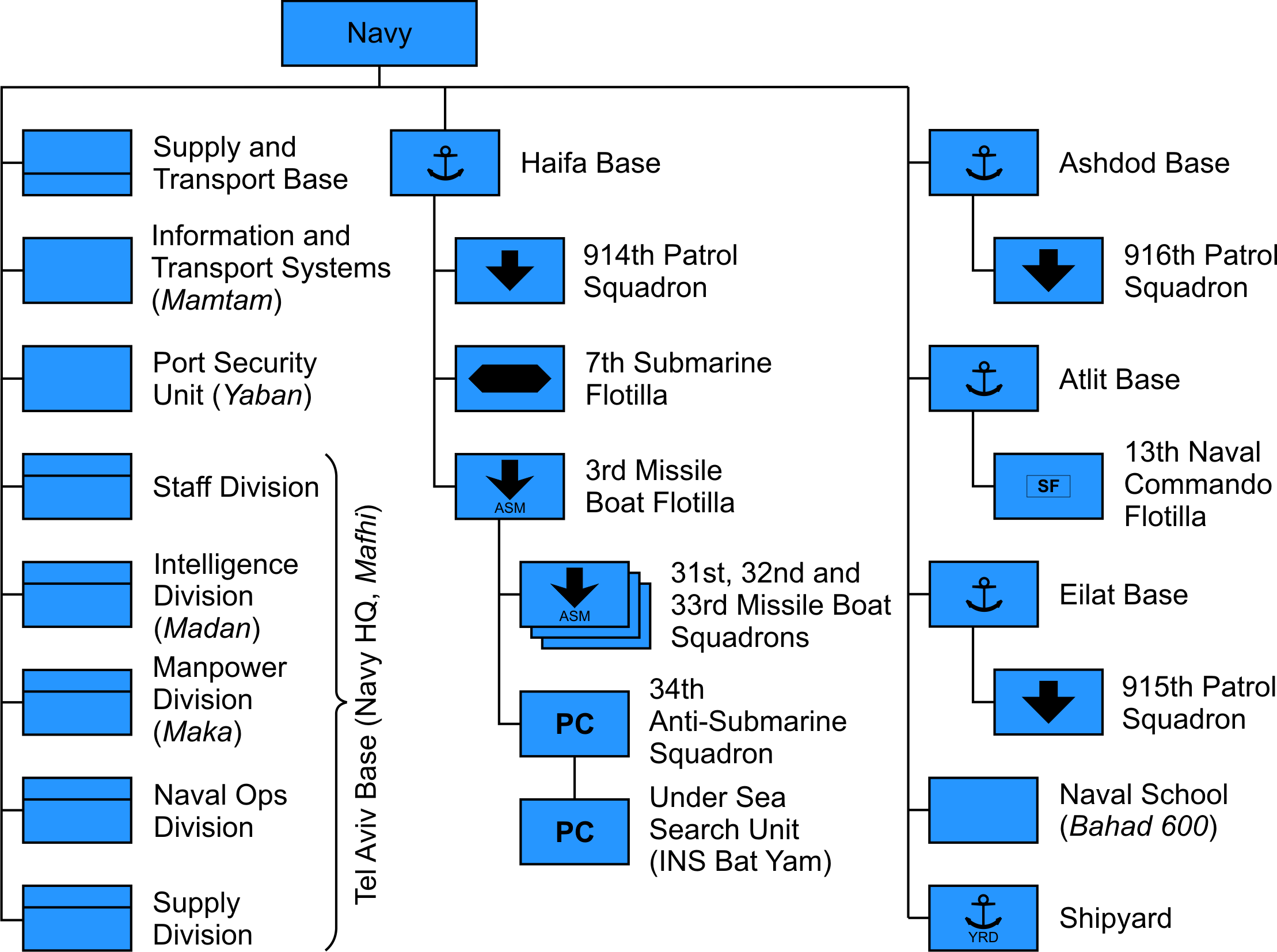
Structure of the Israel Navy

=== Patrol squadrons ===
Squadron 914, Squadron 915, and Squadron 916, based in Haifa, Eilat, and Ashdod respectively, consist of patrol boats. They are responsible for protecting Israel's shores and territorial waters.

Unit's objectives

- Constant patrols in the seas of Israel.
- Identification of watercraft entering Israeli waters.
- Preventing smuggling through the sea
- Protecting national assets, such as drilling rigs.
- Various operations carried out alone, or with other units in and outside of the navy.
- Various other objectives that differ between the squadrons.

=== 3rd Flotilla ===
The missile boat flotilla (Shayetet 3) is based at Haifa naval base. It consists of the 31st and 32nd missile boat squadrons and the 33rd and 36th corvette squadrons.

Unit's objectives

- Protecting Israeli commerce at sea from foreign fleets.
- Preventing a possible naval blockade of Israeli ports during wartime.
- Blockading enemy ports at wartime.
- Fire support for ground units.

=== 7th Flotilla ===
The submarine flotilla (Shayetet 7), a volunteer unit founded in 1959.

Unit's objectives

- Attacking enemy vessels.
- Covert intelligence gathering.
- Deployment and recovery of Shayetet 13 naval commandos.
- Acting as a support unit for other units.
- Believed to be part of the country's nuclear weapons capability.

For security reasons, applicants with dual citizenship must now officially renounce all other citizenships to be accepted into the submarine service training program.

=== 11th Flotilla ===
In May 2022 it was announced that the Navy decided to re-establish Shayetet 11, following this the IDF purchased two LSV vessels which are to be used by the Israeli Navy to conduct amphibious landings as well as to transport supplies.

=== 13th Flotilla ===
Shayetet 13, or Flotilla 13, is an elite naval commando unit which specializes in sea-to-land incursions, counter-terrorism, sabotage operations, maritime intelligence gathering, maritime hostage rescue, and boarding. It is among the most highly trained and secretive units in the Israeli military.

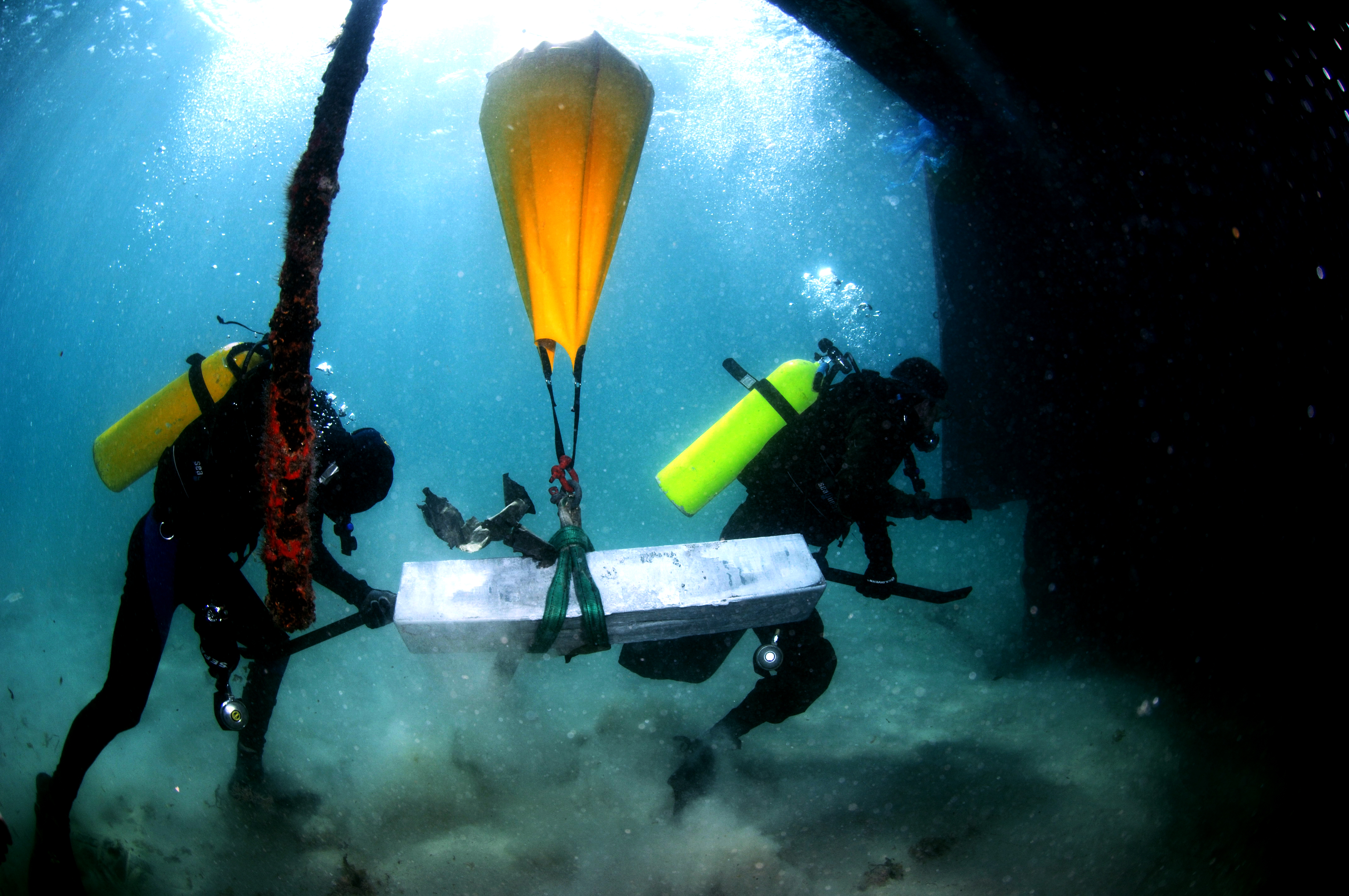
Yaltam divers in training

=== YILTAM 707 ===
YILTAM is the Salvage and underwater works unit of the Israel navy. Formed as the damage control branch of the Navy Shipyards, the unit later incorporated experienced Flotilla-13 divers.

=== Snapir ===
Force protection and harbour security unit. Also, in charge of diving checkups of civilian ships entering Israeli harbours.

=== Intelligence ===
The Naval Intelligence Division is responsible for naval intelligence gathering.

== Current fleet ==
"INS" stands for "Israeli Navy Ship".

=== Missile corvettes ===
Class	Photo	Ships	Commission year	Origin	Notes
Sa'ar 5 [ˈsa'ar] (Tempest)		INS Eilat, [ejˈlat] (Eilat); INS Lahav [ˈlahav] (Blade); INS Hanit [χaˈnit] (Spear)	1994; 1994; 1995	United States	Eilat and Hanit updated with ALPHA radars; Lahav updated with the EL/M-2248 MF-STAR radar.
Sa'ar 6		INS Magen [maˈgen] (Shield); INS Oz (Courage); INS Atzmaut (Independence); INS Nitzachon (Victory)	2020; 2021; 2023; 2023	Germany	

=== Missile boats ===
Class	Photo	Ships	Commission year	Origin	Notes
Sa'ar 4.5		INS Romach, [ˈʁo̞maχ] (Lance) ~~INS Keshet, [ˈke̞ʃe̞t] (Bow)~~ INS Hetz, [ˈχe̞t͡s] (Arrow) INS Kidon, [kiˈdo̞n] (Javelin) INS Tarshish, [tarˈʃiʃ] (Tarshish) INS Yaffo, [ˈjafo̞] (Jaffa) INS Herev, [ˈχe̞ʁe̞v] (Sword) INS Sufa [suˈfa] (Storm)	1981 1982 1991 1995 1995 1998 2002 2003	Israel	INS Kidon was originally a Sa'ar 4 built in 1974 and converted to Saar 4.5 class in 1994; INS Tarshish was originally a Sa'ar 4 built in 1975 and converted to Saar 4.5 class in 1998; INS Yaffo was originally a Sa'ar 4 built in 1975 and converted to Saar 4.5 class in 1998; The Sa'ar 4.5 boats are expected to gradually be replaced with the 80m-long Reshef-class corvette starting in the late 2020s; INS Keshet retired October 2026

=== Submarines ===
Class	Photo	Boats	Commission year	Origin	Notes
Dolphin class		INS Dolphin, [do̞lˈfin] (Dolphin) INS Livyathan, [livjaˈtan] (Whale) INS Tekumah, [tkuˈma] (Revival)	1999 1999 2000	Germany	Expected to be replaced with the Dakar-class submarines starting in the early 2030s
AIP Dolphin 2 class		INS Tanin, [taˈnin] (Crocodile) INS Rahav, [ˈʁahav] (Rahab) INS Drakon, [dʁaˈko̞n] (Dragon)	Launched 2012, commissioned 30 June 2014 Launched 2013, commissioned 13 January 2016 2026 (est).	Germany	The third boat, INS Drakon, was handed over to the Israeli Navy in July 2026 and departed Germany on her delivery voyage in August 2026

=== Patrol boats ===
Class	Photo	Number of ships	Commissioned	Origin	Notes
Dvora, [dvo̞ˈʁa] (Bee)		9	1988	Israel	
Super Dvora Mk II, [suˈpe̞ʁ dvo̞ˈʁa]		2	1996	Israel	
Super Dvora Mk III		13	2004	Israel	
Shaldag, [ʃalˈdaɡ] (Kingfisher)		5	1989	Israel	
Defender		9	2002	Israel	
Rafael Protector USV		N/A	2000s	Israel	Unmanned Naval Patrol Vehicles
Silver Marlin		N/A	2006?	Israel	USV Naval Patrol Vehicles

=== Support ships ===
Class	Photo	Boat(s)	Commissioned	Origin	Notes
Stollergrund		INS Bat Yam	1989 German Navy; transferred to the Israeli Navy in 2004.	Germany	Sister ship Bat Galim transferred to oceanographic research.
General Frank S. Besson		INS Nahshon INS Komemiyut	2023 2024	United States	Built by Ingalls Shipbuilding to Israeli requirements. Expected to serve in a troop landing and logistics support role.

=== Commando boats ===
- Dolphin type underwater craft
- Hazir (the Italian Maiale) [χaˈziʁ] (pig) underwater craft
- Snunit [sno̞ˈnit] (Swallow) boats
- Zaharon [zahaˈʁo̞n] (Lionfish) boats
- Mulit [muˈlit] (Mullus) boats
- Morena rigid-hulled inflatable boats

=== Aircraft ===
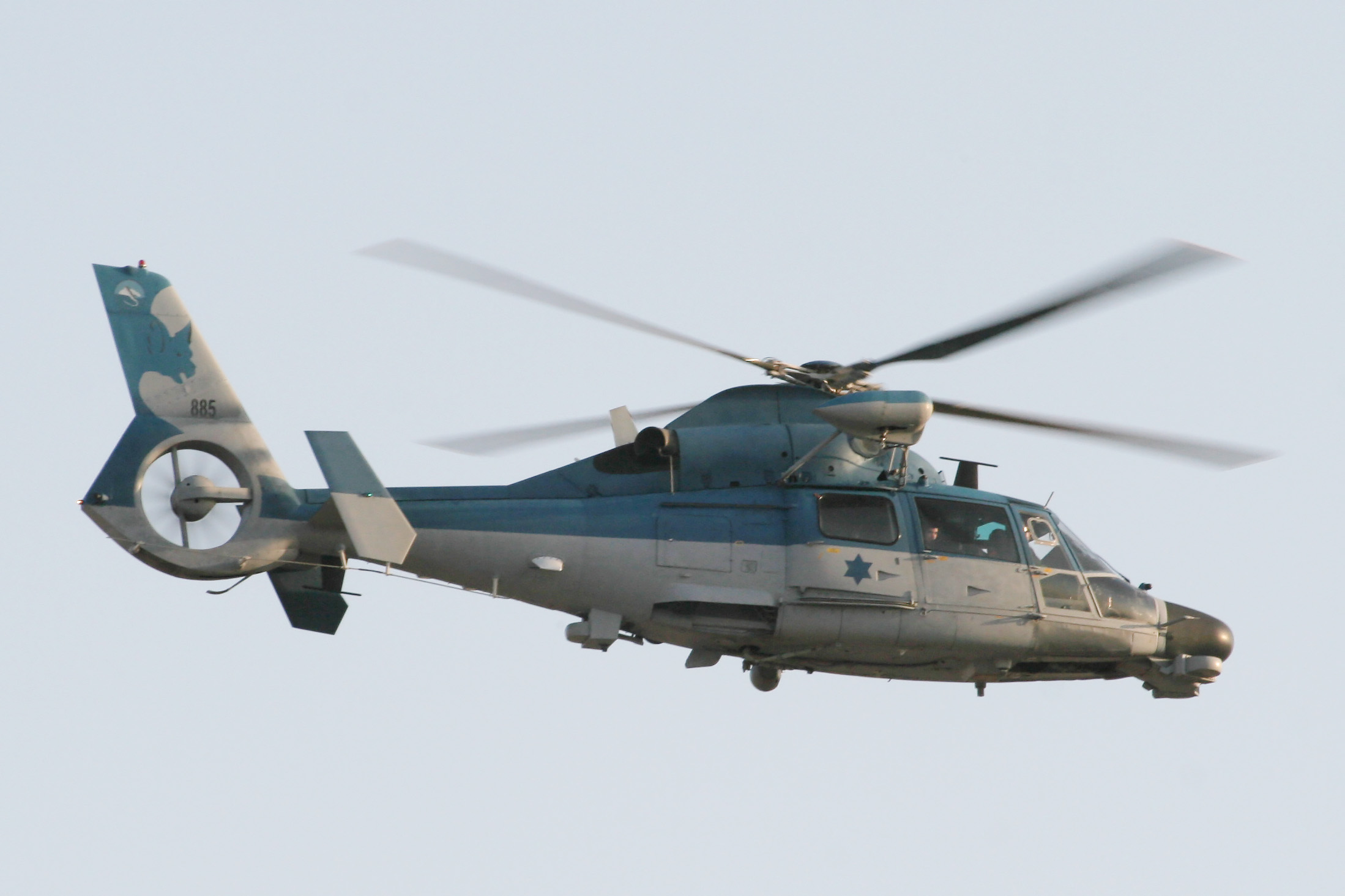
Israeli AS565MA Atalef, 2007

Aircraft operated by the Israeli Navy, even when including on-board Navy mission specialists, are flown and maintained by Israeli Air Force personnel and are part of the air force command structure.

- 193 Squadron – Eurocopter AS565 Panther – 7

==== Unmanned aerial vehicles ====
- Aeronautics Defense Orbiter
- The navy has an unmanned helicopter (manufactured by Aeronautics Defense Systems) on Sa'ar 5-class corvettes.

=== Equipment ===
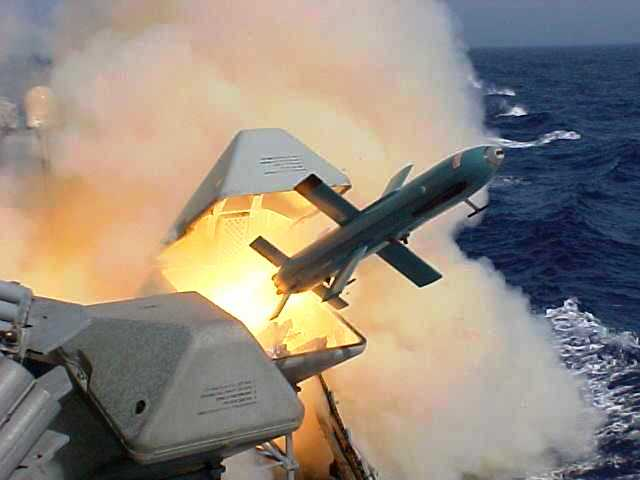
Israel Aerospace Industries Gabriel missile

- Barak 1 – Point-defence SAM
- Barak 8 – Long range SAM and anti-missile defence system
- Barak MX – Modular air defence system known as Barak Magen in Israeli Navy service
- Gabriel – sea-to-sea missile
- Harpoon – anti-ship missile
- Popeye (AGM-142 Have Nap) – air/submarine-launched cruise missile. Dolphin-class submarines believed to carry Popeye Turbo with a range >1500 km and the option for nuclear warheads.
- Typhoon Weapon Station – remote-operated 25mm gun system
- NAVLAR Artillery Rocket System
- EL/M-2221 STGR – Search, Track & Guidance/Gunnery Radar
- EL/M-2228S AMDR – Automatic Missile Detection Radar
- EL/M-2228X SGRS – Surveillance & Gunnery Radar System
- EL/M-2238 STAR – Surveillance & Threat Alert Radar
- EL/M-2226 ACSR – Advanced Coastal Surveillance Radar

== Future ==
Currently under construction is a sixth Dolphin 2 submarine (INS Drakon). Israel has signed an MoU with Germany for the construction of three Dakar-class submarines with expected delivery in the late 2020s, which will replace its three Dolphin 1 submarines delivered in the late 1990s.

In August 2021, Israel Shipyards announced that the Israeli Navy has signed an agreement with it for the design and supply of a new class of missile boats based on Israel Shipyards' Sa'ar 72-class design that would replace its Sa'ar 4.5 ships starting in the mid-2020s. Israel Shipyards would construct a large dry dock which would enable it to outfit these new corvettes with various Israeli-made systems, as well as to service and maintain the corvettes in addition to Dolphin submarines.

In an October 2021 interview, the head of the Israeli Navys` Naval Vessels Department said that these new Reshef-class corvettes would be equipped with Rafael Advanced Defense Systems's C-Dome air-defence system. He said that their design was expected to be complete in about two years, and the first ship would likely take another two to four years to construct. Eight are to be built, with each replacing a Sa'ar 4.5 upon being commissioned.

== Ranks ==
The Israeli Navy is small compared to other Navies and the officers chain of command is as follows with respect to Royal – Navy / United States:

Officers

Rank group	General / flag officers			Senior officers			Junior officers
Israeli Navy
Israeli Navy	רב-אלוף; Rav aluf	אלוף; Aluf	תת-אלוף; Tat aluf	אלוף משנה; Aluf mishne	סגן-אלוף; Sgan aluf	רב סרן; Rav seren	סרן; Seren	סגן; Segen	סגן-משנה; Segen mishne

Enlisted

Rank group	Senior NCOs							Junior NCOs	Enlisted
Israeli Navy									No insignia
Israeli Navy	רב-נגד; Rav nagad	רב-סמל בכיר; Rav samal bakhír	רב-סמל מתקדם; Rav samal mitkadem	רב-סמל ראשון; Rav samal rishon	רב-סמל; Rav samal	סמל ראשון; Samal rishon	סמל; Samal	רב טוראי; Rav turai	טוראי; Turai

Sleeve rank of Israeli Navy Commander-in-Chief is a rank of honor. This began as special permission from Lt. General Amnon Lipkin-Shahak (then chief of staff of the IDF) and allows the Navy Commander-in-Chief to have a sleeve rank of Vice Admiral which is equal to Lt. General, the rank of the IDF Chief of Staff. However the de facto rank of Israeli Navy Commander-in-Chief is Rear Admiral and the gesture given to the navy is ceremonial only when meeting foreign commanding officers.

The same resolution as mentioned above applies to the rank of Commodore. There is ceremonial-only sleeve rank of Rear Admiral while by the IDF hierarchy and chain of command he remains a commodore.

== See also ==
- Cherbourg Project
- INS Dakar
- Military equipment of Israel
- Betar Naval Academy
- Israel Defense Forces ranks
- List of flags of Israel
- Israeli Naval Academy

== Sources ==
- Gerhard, William D.; Millington, Henry W. (1981). Attack on a SIGINT Collector, the USS Liberty (PDF). NSA History Report, U.S. Cryptologic History series (Report). National Security Agency. Archived from the original (PDF) on 30 October 2012. partially declassified 1999, 2003.
