= Haifa naval base =

Israeli naval base

Coordinates: 32°49′49″N 34°59′36″E

Haifa Naval Base
- Israel
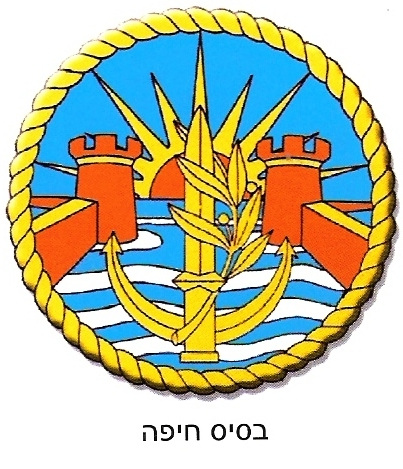

Site information
- Type: Naval Base
- Owner: Israel Defense Forces
- Operator: Israeli Navy

Location
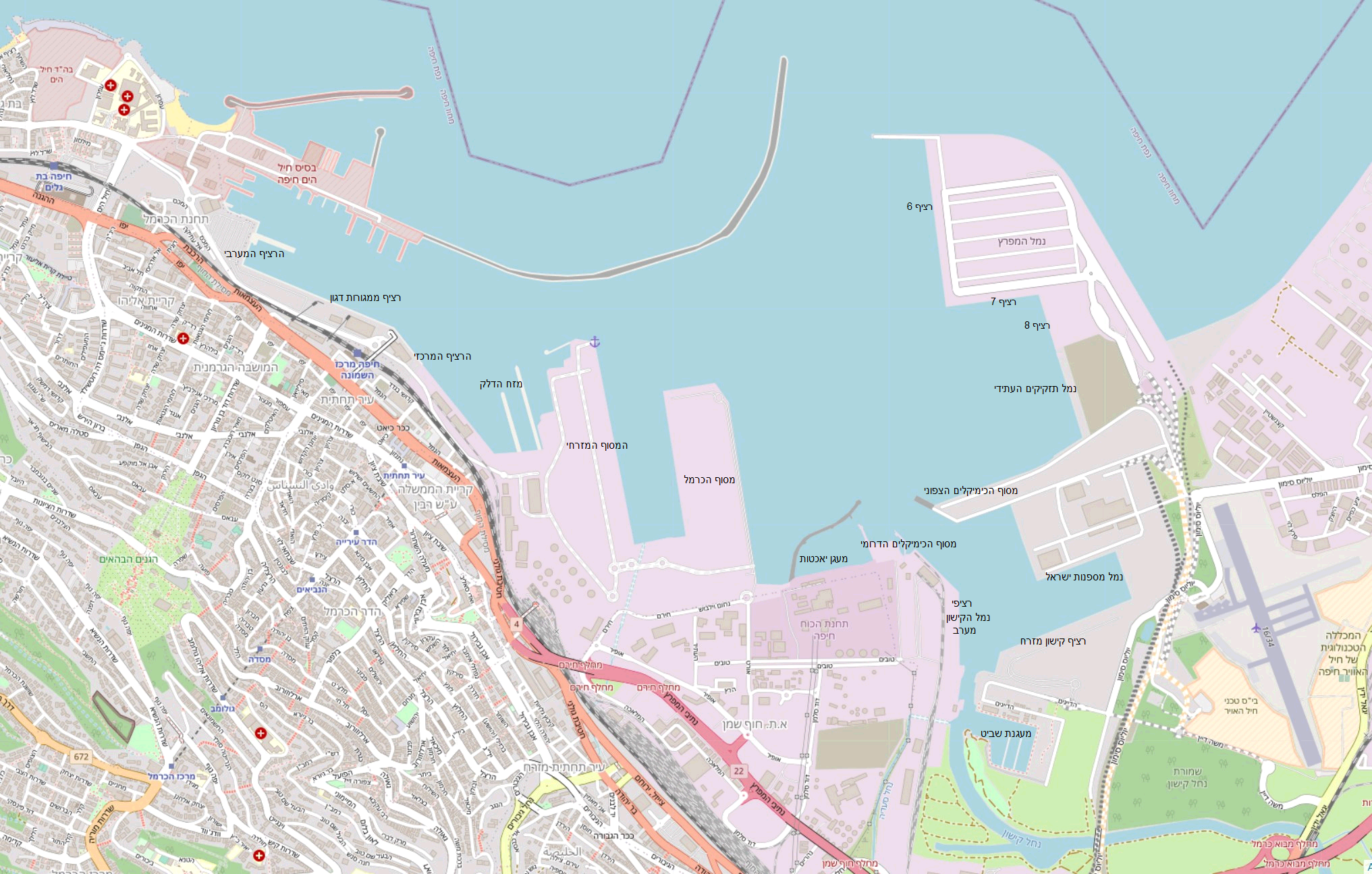
- Map of ports in Haifa Bay

Garrison information
- Garrison: Israeli Navy: 7th Flotilla; 3rd Flotilla; 914th Patrol Squadron; YALTAM; Institute of Naval Medicine; Snapir unit; Technical squadron; Personnel squadron; Logistics squadron; Defense squadron

The Haifa naval base is a base of Israeli Navy, located in Haifa, Israel, and constitutes the main naval base of the Israel Defense Forces. The base is the hub of Israel's naval force. The naval base has submarines, missile boats and other vessels. The base operates five Dolphin-class submarines, widely believed to carry Popeye Turbo cruise missiles armed with nuclear weapons. On 7 February 2021, Brigadier General Tal Politis was appointed to serve as commander of the Haifa naval base, replacing Brigadier General Guy Goldfarb.

== Organization ==
The base is home to the Israeli Navy's 3rd Flotilla, its main surface force, which is composed of corvettes and missile boats, the 7th Flotilla, its submarine force, Squadron 914, a squadron of the navy's 15th Flotilla, its patrol boat flotilla, YALTAM, the navy's unit for underwater missions, the Institute of Naval Medicine, and elements of the Snapir unit, the navy's harbor security unit. The main role of the base is to secure the shipping lanes of the State of Israel, to maintain and improve the operational capacity of the corps and to carry out routine security tasks. The base commander who is the commander of the northern arena in the navy is an officer with the rank of brigadier general and is also referred to as "Commander BH".

Coastal squadrons are also located at the base: the technical squadron, the personnel squadron, the logistics squadron, the defense squadron and more.

Haifa Naval Shipyard is in the west of the base.

As the navy's submarine base, Haifa naval base is home to Israel's Dolphin-class submarines, widely believed to carry Popeye Turbo cruise missiles armed with nuclear weapons.

== History ==
On July 12, 1961 as part of the Thirteenth Navy Day celebrations, with the participation of important guests. Navy Commander Yohai Ben Nun and Haifa Mayor Abba Khushi inaugurated the new building of the Haifa base in the west of the port.

On the night of April 20, 1979, four militants in a rubber boat penetrated the security system of the base in Rosh Hankara. They landed in Nahariya and attacked civilians. The condition of the sea, which was short waves and white waves, prevented the discovery of the boat even though the formation was on full alert. This event was a catalyst for refreshing all areas of the base and the detection system was strengthened with night vision devices. The militants from Lebanon continued with penetration attempts, but the detection and security system of the base prevented them all further attempts.

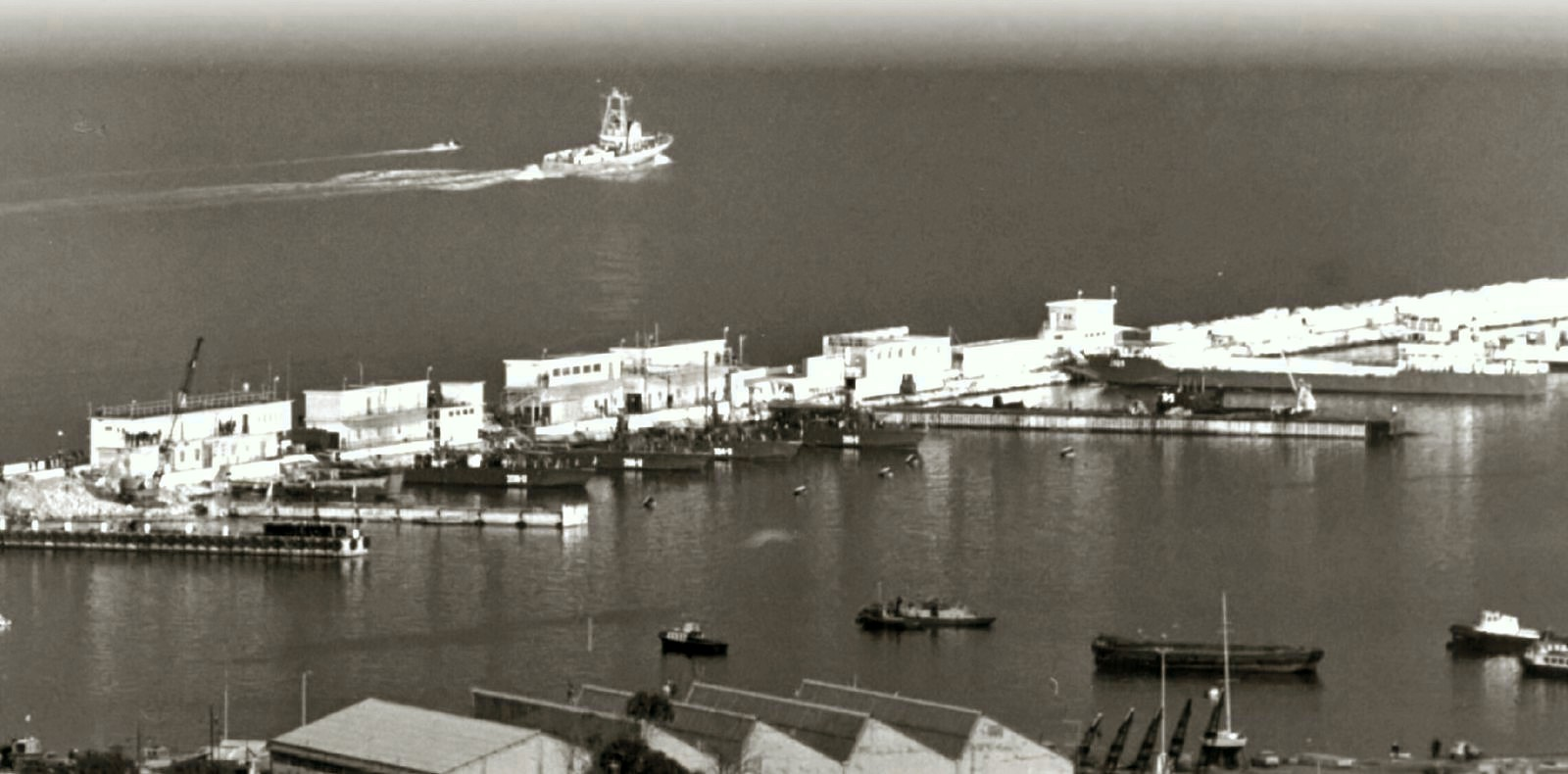
Haifa Port base December 1967

== See also ==
- Israeli Navy
