= BHD 600 =

Sole naval training base of the Israeli Navy

- Israel
- Symbol of the base

Site information
- Type: Naval Training Base
- Owner: Israel Defense Forces
- Operator: Israeli Navy

Garrison information
- Garrison: Israeli Navy: Training group; Simulator Fleet; Tash Kashrut squadron; Stil Kashrut squadron; Coastal Technical Training Squadron; School for officers; Submarine training squadron; Naval Command School; Tzur-Yam

BHD 600 or Haifa naval training base is the sole naval training base of the Israeli Navy. It is located in the port city of Haifa and is responsible for the training of most of Israeli Navy personnel.

== Roles ==
The base is responsible for the training of all Israeli Navy personnel except Shayetet 13 and YILTAM fighters. All Shayetet 3, Shayetet 7 and regular personnel are trained here in addition to supplementary training for commanders. UAV and UUV operators are also trained here. In addition to training, regular military exercises are also held here.

== Organisation ==
- Training group - trains the instructors, the course commanders in building courses and improving them.
- Simulator Fleet - unites under it the simulator training course and the regular training in the various simulators in the fields of Shayetet 7 and Shayetet 3 and Naval intelligence
- Tash Kashrut squadron - training for recruiters, command and controls.
- Stil Kashrut squadron - For specialisation in secondary services.
- Coastal Technical Training Squadron - Training in small arms and electronic equipments.
- School for officers - a school for conscripts and military officer training.
- Submarine training squadron - Training for Shayetet 7 personnel.
- The Naval Command School - training for ship commanders.
- Tzur-Yam - a high school specializing in technological expertise.

== History ==
=== Establishment ===
The base was established in 1965 and training missions were initiated in 1967 after the arrival of new ships from Cherbourg after the Cherbourg Project. These vessels were initially used for training purpose.

=== Yom Kippur War ===
In the 1960s, limited facilities at the training base prompted Israeli Navy to hold drills in Malta as Naval Combat exercises couldn't be held at the training base. With the passage of time, the facilities were gradually improved and helped to strengthen up the Israeli Navy before the Yom Kippur War.

=== Evacuation attempts ===
At the end of the 1990s, the Haifa Administration wanted to promote a plan for the construction of a marina in Bat Galim . Environmental activists opposed the plan, which included drying up an extensive sea area, for the purpose of construction that would finance the construction of the marina. The Society for the Protection of Nature proposed an alternative plan that included the evacuation of the base and the construction of a marina in the area opposite to it, which was not accessible to the public. In January 2003, the Israel Land Administration also presented a plan for the development of Bat Galim that included the evacuation of the base. In May 2008, local authorities approved the construction of a neighborhood of 1,000 housing units in the base area. However, the plan did not go into effect, as the Ministry of Defense refused to sign an agreement to evacuate the base. In 2015, the plan was transferred to the National Committee for the Planning and Construction of Preferred Housing Complexes, with the hope that its rapid advancement would serve as leverage to renew negotiations with the Ministry of Defense, but it did not advance the plan.

=== Hulda Gurvitz Strip ===
At the end of 2017, it was agreed that the base would vacate only a strip of beach along the seashore, so that for the first time so that a sequence of promenades would be created, in front of the sea from the Mediterranean coast, through the beach of the base, Bat Galim beach to the southern beaches of the Haifa. The construction of the boardwalk began in 2018, most of it was completed, and in August 2020 it was decided to name it after Hulda Gurvitz. however the Navy withdrew from the agreement and refused to allow the construction to be completed.

== Commanders ==
Base commanders
#	Rank and name	Command period	Image
1	Abraham Ofer	1949 – 1950	
2	Yehiel Zaltz	1950 – 1951	
3	Shlomo Arel	1952	
4	Aryeh Friedman	1953 – 1954	
5	Yitzhak Gazit	1954 – 1956	
6	Yehuda Igra	February 1957 – February 1962	
7	Yehuda Ben-Zur	June 1962 – May 1965	
8	Lt. Col. Yekutiel Netz	May 1965 – March 1968	שמאל
9	Yitzhak Shoshan	March 1968 – July 1968	שמאל
10	Aryeh Barak	July 1968 – March 1971	
11	Eli Levy	April 1971 - June 1971	
12	Pinchas Pinhasi	June 1971 – June 1974	
13	Shabtai Levy	July 1974 – June 13, 1975	
14	Shaul Sela	June 13, 1975 – July 1977	
15	Abraham Ben Shushan	August 1977 – June 1978	
16	Yitzhak Koral Almog	July 1978 – August 1981	
17	Alex Tal	August 1981 – August 1983	
18	Doron Amir	August 1983 – July 1986	שמאל
19	Danny Melamed	July 1986 – July 1989	שמאל
20	Bani Arieli	August 1989 – July 1991	שמאל
21	Dror Aloni	August 1991 – January 1993	
22	Dodo Iver	June 1993 – April 1995	
23	Bnei Hod	April 1995 – October 1997	
24	Shloma Cohen	October 1997 – September 1999	
25	Eli Gambash	September 1999 – April 2002	
26	Benny Shefnier	April 2002 – October 2004	
27	Ilan Shariki	October 2004 – August 2007	
28	Ronan Niemani	August 2007 – July 2011	
29	Tzachi Appelman	July 2011 – August 2013	
30	Sami Tzemach	August 2013 – 2015	
31	Yuval Ilon	2015 – July 2017	
32	Nadav Turgeman	July 2017 – August 2019	
33	Boris Shuster	August 2019 – July 2021	
34	Tamir Shemesh	July 2021 - incumbent	

== Sources & References ==
- Moshe Oron, מתקן תרגול טאקטי, 'Marine Systems' 104, July 1971, p. 16.
- Yosef Yerblum and Aryeh Doblin, הפנימיה לאלקטרוניקה, 'Marine Systems' 105, October 1971, p. 28
- Major Eli, בסיס הדרכה של חיל הים, 'Marine Systems' 107–108, March 1972, p. 56.
- Rafiki, בה"ד - קמפוס במדי צבא, 'Between Waves' June 1974, p. 2.
- Batia Shem-El, מדסית בפעולה, 'Between Waves' April 1975, p. 20.
- Amnon Shafi. "'12 projects to absorb the 12 steels'", The Center for Maritime Policy and Strategy Research, Haifa University, October 2023, p. 58.
- מחנה בת גלים, "Navy" booklet September 3, 1948, p. 31.
- M. sailor, בסיס הדרכה של חיל הים, "Sea Systems" 29, June 1956, pp. 20–27.
- Meir Shapir, בבסיס ההדרכה, "Marine Systems" 95, August 1969, p. 19.
- Lt. Col. Sh. דמיינים מאמ"נים בשירות הצי, 'Between Waves' 162 July 1984 p. 32.
- Aryeh Kiesel, סוף סוף מנערים אבק - בבה"ד משנים תוכניות לימוד, 'Between Waves' 165 June 1985 p. 12.
- Ruthie Rodner, יום המדריך עוד שלב בפרויקט ההדרכה בבהד, 'Between Waves' 172 October 1987, p. 20.
- Raanan Cherbinski, על ראש התורן ואדמה סביב - המרכז החדש לתרגול טקטי בבה"ד, 'Between Waves' 174 June 1988 p. 8.
- Sigal Bochris and Avi Oval, מתקני האימון הסימולטורים בבה"ד וגם סיום קורס נגדי משמעת, 'Between Waves' 177 April 1989 pp. 22 and 27.
- Sigal Bochris and Avi Oval, חנוכת המת"ט החדש, 'Between Waves' 178 August 1989 p. 14.
- Sigal Buchris, הדרכה מסוג אחר, 'Between Waves' 179 November 1989 p. 14.
- Sigal Bochris and Avi Oval, בקרית אש במאמ"ן וגם טל קאופמן מדריכת פי"ם במילואים, 'Between Waves' 180 April 1990 pp. 44 and 58.
- Aryeh Kiesel and Shani Fais, ימאות מבראשית במעגן הסירות בבה"ד, וגם עלה ים" איך מסיימים קורסים בחיל הים וגם אולפן וידאו בבה"ד, "Between Waves" 181 August 1990, pp. 53, 54 and 68.
- Ilanit Fener, ילדי הים בהד חיל הים מסייע לילדים חולי סרטן ברמב"ם, "Between Waves" issue October 1, 2001 p. 68.
- Rose Barel, ילדי הים - בית ספר "צור ים", "Between Waves", December 2009, p. 8.
- Rose Barel and Raz Sharga, כמו בצוללת - הסימולטור, "Between Waves", October 2010, p. 42.
- Ado Neuhaus, יומן מסע - מלח ים והרבה פאסון קורס דבורנים, "Between Waves", October 2010, p. 58.
- Annie Elroy, הבה"ד השער הראשי של חיל הים, 'Between Waves' May 2014, p. 59.
- Annie Elroy, המצטינות לסימולטור -מערך הסימולטורים בבה"ד חיל הים, "Between Waves", October 2014, p. 52.
- Annie Elroy, בדרכי נועם - סמי צמח מפקד בה"ד, "Between Waves", September 2015, p. 44.
- Oral Elhadad and Brit Almog, מהפכת הסימולטורים של זרוע הים וגם צור ים - כשחזון הופך למציאות, "Between Waves", May 2017, p. 14 and 47.
