= Battle of Rumani Coast =

War of Attrition naval battle, July 1967

- Part of the War of Attrition
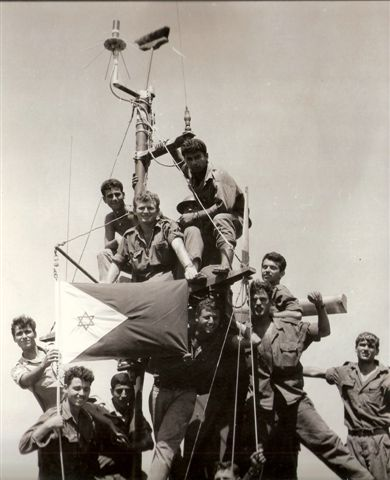
- Israeli MTB crew raise the broom on the topmast as a traditional maritime sign of victory.
| Date | July 11, 1967; 59 years ago |
| Location | Sinai coast, near Rumani vicinity |
| Result | Israeli victory |

Belligerents
| Israel | Egypt |

Commanders and leaders
| Yitzhak Shushan; Eli Rahav | Unknown |

Strength
| 1 destroyer 2 torpedo boats | 2 torpedo boats |

Casualties and losses
| None | 2 MTBs sunk no known survivors |

The Battle of Rumani Coast (Hebrew: קרב רומני, romanized: Krav Rumani) was a naval engagement that took place on the night of July 11, 1967 between Israeli and Egyptian naval forces, near the vicinity of Rumani. Two Egyptian motor torpedo boats were sunk in the action for no Israeli losses.

== Background ==
Following Israel's victory in the Six-Day War, Israel's coastline was significantly enlarged and now included the Sinai Peninsula coast. The Israeli Navy now sought to enforce Israeli sovereignty over this large area and began regular patrols of the Sinai coastline up to the approaches of Port Said.

== Battle ==
On July 9, INS Eilat, an ex-British Royal Navy Z-class destroyer commanded by Yitzhak Shushan, proceeded due west toward the Sinai coast. INS Eilat subsequently rendezvoused with ex-French motor torpedo boats Aya and Daya of the Torpedo fleet. The flotilla patrolled northwest of the Sinai coast, under orders to stop vessels crossing the demarcation line toward the Sinai coast.

On July 11, at approximately 21:45 pm, the signals intelligence intercept operator in Eilat reported two Egyptian missile boats were about to sortie. The Israeli torpedo boats picked up a target on radar shortly thereafter. The Egyptians were about 15 miles from the MTBs and 12 miles from Eilat, moving east at 15 kn (17 mph; 28 km/h). The Israelis marked a course to intercept. Eilat closed from the north, Aya and Daya from the east. The Egyptian vessels, later identified as P 6-class torpedo boats, discovered the Israeli MTBs approaching at full speed and commenced fire. The Israelis returned fire with Bofors and Oerlikons. The initial run scored no hits but the Egyptian MTBs dispersed. The separation enabled Eilat to close one and the two MTBs the other. Twenty minutes later, both P 6s were ablaze. The fire caused their torpedoes to explode. There were no Israeli losses and no known Egyptian survivors.

== Gallery ==
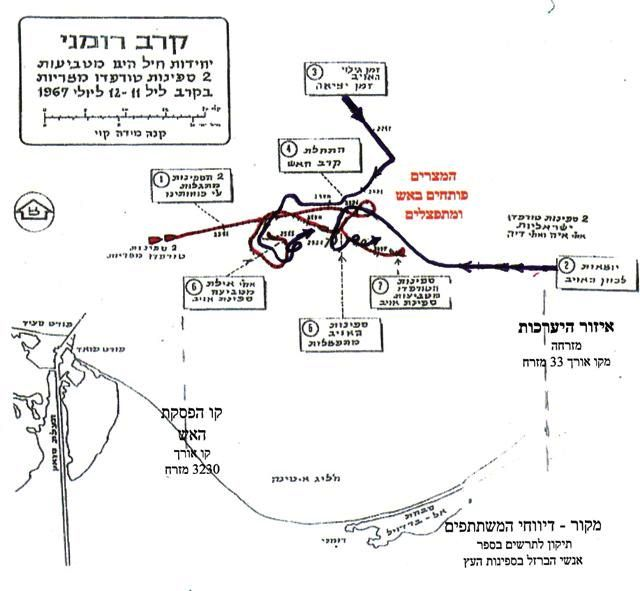
Map of naval battle fought on July 11, 1967 off Sinai coast, written in Hebrew.

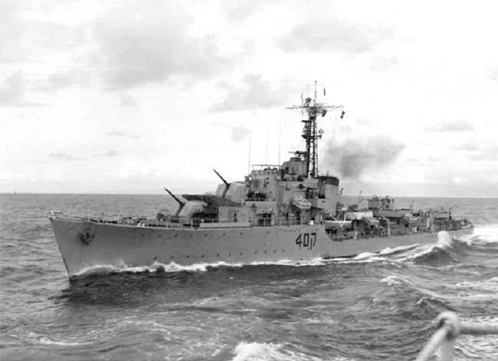
INS Eilat, ex-Royal Navy Z-class destroyer.

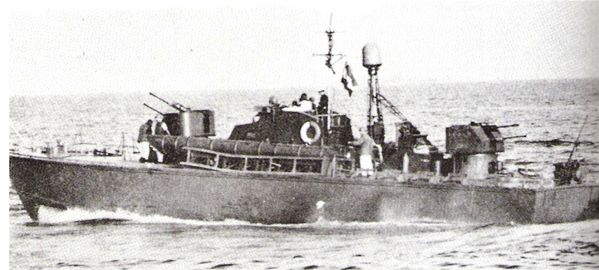
Soviet-built Egyptian MTB, similar to the ones used by the Egyptians at Rumani.

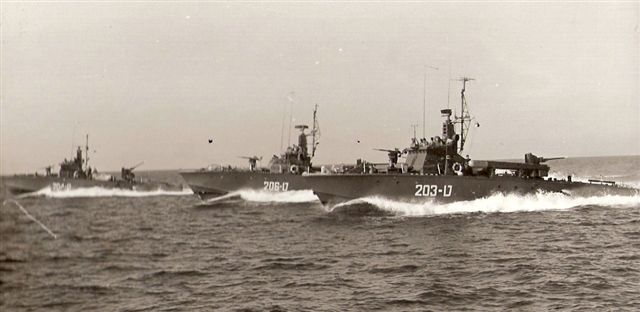
Israeli MTBs. The boat in the background (left), is the command boat T-204 INS Daya. The boat in the foreground is T-203 INS Aya. Both boats took part in the battle.
