= Ashdod Naval Base =

Israeli naval base

Ashdod Naval Base
- Israel
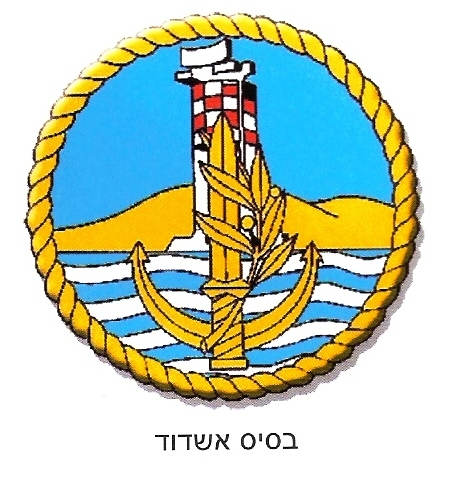
- Logo of the base

Site information
- Type: Naval Base
- Owner: Israel Defense Forces
- Operator: Israeli Navy

Location
- Coordinates: 31°49′16″N 34°38′37″E

Garrison information
- Garrison: Israeli Navy: Shayetet 11; 916th Squadron

Ashdod Naval Base, also known as Southern Arena by the Israeli Navy, is a naval base located in the port city of Ashdod near the Port of Ashdod. It plays an important role in the surveillance and blockade of the Gaza Strip, as well as in protecting the Port of Ashdod.

== History ==
=== Establishment ===
The construction of the permanent camp in the south of the port began in 1965. A temporary base was established in the port within a day. Lt. Col. Yekutiel Netz was appointed as the commander of the base.

=== Six Day War ===
Amphibious warfare ships in preparation for the landing operation at El Arish beach were stationed there. During the Six Day War and after it, ships from the 914th Torpedo Squadron were attached to floats and received fuel and supplies from the base.

==== War of Attrition ====
During the War of Attrition, the Israeli warships engaged with an Egyptian destroyer, sinking the destroyer in about 25 minutes. This incident came to be known as Battle of Romani. The Israeli warships were directed from this base.

=== Inauguration ===
The inauguration of the permanent camp of the Navy base in Ashdod was held on 12 August 1968. The commander of the navy stated "the new base of the navy in Ashdod is a key to maintaining the ongoing security and sovereignty of Israel along the southern coasts from North Sinai to the entrances of Port Said".

=== Yom Kippur War ===
The Battle of Baltim was fought between the Israeli Navy and the Egyptian Navy on 8–9 October 1973, during the Yom Kippur War between Baltim and Damietta. The Israeli warships that participated in the battle were stationed and co-ordinated from this base.

=== Relocation attempts ===
In the early 1980s, Defense Minister Ariel Sharon wanted to bring the Navy closer to Gaza to save sailing time by moving the base to the city of Ashkelon. The mayor of Ashdod, Zvi Zilkar, strongly opposed this, partly and the plan was ultimately cancelled.

=== Aftermath of the First Intifada ===
After the First Intifada and the creation of a Palestinian Authority in Gaza Strip, five patrols boats were organised for regular patrols which number grew to be seven patrol boats.

==== Disengagement from Gaza ====
During the Israeli disengagement from Gaza, the base served as a major evacuation and transport hub for the evacuation of Israel Defense Forces (IDF) personnel from Gaza strip.

=== 2006 Gaza–Israel conflict ===
During the Operation Summer Rains on 26 June, the Israeli Navy imposed a naval closure of the Gaza Strip, to prevent the hostage Gilad Shalit being smuggled out by sea by the Palestinian militants. The navy increased patrols of naval vessels along the Gaza coastline, and prepared for an attempt to smuggle Shalit out by boat, sending instructions to captains. Palestinian fast boats were banned from operating in the area, and only small Palestinian fishing boats were allowed on the sea. These patrols were organised from this base.

=== Blockade of the Gaza Strip ===
The Blockade of the Gaza Strip starting in 2007 was organised from this base.

=== Operation Cast Lead ===
During the Gaza War (2008–2009) the Israeli Navy attacked Hamas' rocket launchers and outposts, command and control centers, a Hamas patrol boat, and the office of Hamas Prime Minister Ismail Haniyeh, using the Typhoon Weapon System and surface to surface missiles. The navy coordinated with other Israeli forces and used powerful shipboard sensors to acquire and shell targets on land. Records of the attacks published by the navy indicate that for the first time vessels were equipped with Spike ER electro-optically guided anti-armor missiles. Videos of an attack showed precision hits from a Typhoon stabilizing gun despite a rolling sea. Versions of the Spike were also used by ground units and possibly by helicopters or unmanned aerial vehicles. Shayetet 13 naval commandos were also deployed to attack targets on land, and reportedly attacked an Iranian ship loaded with arms for Hamas, which was docking in Sudan. On 28 December, Naval vessels shelled the Port of Gaza.

On 29 December, the Free Gaza Movement relief boat Dignity carrying volunteer doctors with 3.5 tons of medical supplies, human rights activists (Among them Caoimhe Butterly and former US Representative Cynthia McKinney), and a CNN reporter was involved in an altercation with Israeli patrol boats. The captain of the Free Gaza vessel said that their vessel had been rammed intentionally and that there had been no warning before it had been rammed. An Israeli spokesman disputed this, and said the collision was caused by the Dignity attempting to outmaneuver the patrol boats after disobeying Israeli orders to turn back.

On 4 January the Israeli Navy extended its blockade of the Gaza Strip to 20 nautical miles (37 km; 23 mi).

Naval squadrons during the Operation Warm Winter were also coordinated from here.

Throughout the war, the Israeli Navy employed Sa'ar 4.5-class missile boats of the flotilla in addition to Super Dvora Mk III-class patrol boats which were coordinated from this base.

=== May 2010 Gaza flotilla raid ===
On 31 May 2010, the Israeli Navy seized an aid convoy of six ships known as the "Gaza Freedom Flotilla". aiming to break through the blockade, carrying humanitarian aid and construction materials. The flotilla had declined an Israeli request to change course to the Ashdod base, where the Israeli government had said it would inspect the aid and deliver (or let humanitarian organizations deliver) Israeli-approved items to Gaza.

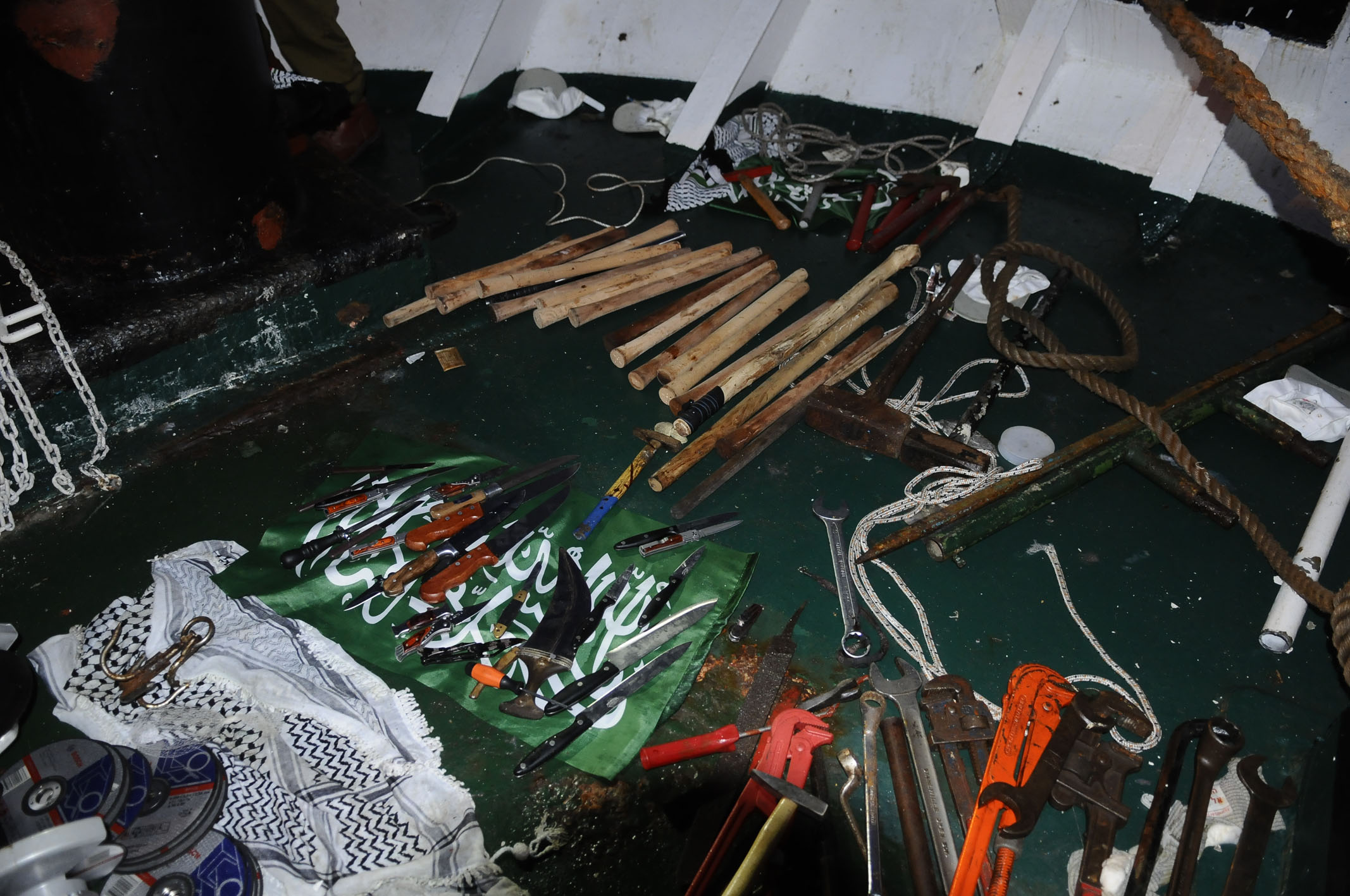
Pictured here: Knives, wrenches, and wooden clubs used to attack the soldiers during the 2010 Gaza flotilla raid

Israeli Shayetet 13 naval commandos boarded the ships from speedboats and helicopters launched from three missile ships, while the flotilla was still in international waters. On the MV Mavi Marmara, the main ship of the convoy, passengers attacked and managed to capture three soldiers. Israeli soldiers responded with rubber bullets and live ammunition from soldiers in helicopters and on the ship. Several of the activists were shot in the head by Israeli forces, some from behind and at close range. Israel was accused of using disproportionate force. On other ships, soldiers were met with passive resistance which was easily suppressed with non-lethal techniques. Nine passengers were killed and dozens wounded. Nine soldiers were also injured, two of them seriously. All of the ships were seized and towed to Ashdod, while passengers were imprisoned in Israel and then deported to their home countries. The MV Rachel Corrie, a seventh ship that had been delayed, set sail from Malta on the same day of the flotilla's interception. Israeli naval vessels shadowed the Rachel Corrie, and after it ignored three warnings, Israeli commandos boarded the ship from speedboats, arrested the crew, and forced it to sail to Ashdod.

=== Freedom Flotilla II ===
Following the Gaza flotilla raid, a coalition of 22 non-governmental organizations (NGOs) assembled in July 2011 a flotilla of 10 vessels and 1,000 activists to breach the blockade.

The vessels docked in Greece in preparation for the journey to Gaza. However, the Greek government announced that it would not allow the vessels to leave for Gaza, and the Hellenic Coast Guard stopped three vessels attempting to evade the travel ban and leave port. On 7 July, most activists left for home, leaving only a few dozen to continue the initiative. On 16 July, the French yacht Dignite Al Karama was allowed to leave port after informing Greek authorities that its destination was Alexandria, Egypt. Instead, the yacht headed directly for Gaza. The Israeli Navy stopped the Dignite Al Karama about 65 kilometres (40 mi) off Gaza. After the boat was warned and refused to turn back, it was surrounded by three Israeli naval vessels and boarded by Shayetet 13 commandos, who took it over. The boat was then taken to Ashdod base. Ultimately, the Freedom Flotilla sailing did not take place.

=== Third Gaza Flotilla ===
On 4 November 2011, the Israeli Navy intercepted two vessels heading towards Gaza in a private initiative to break the blockade. Shayetet 13 commandos boarded the vessels from speedboats and took them over with no resistance. The vessels were then taken to Ashdod base.

=== Operation Iron Law ===
During the Victoria Affair, the ship Victoria was seized about 200 nautical miles (370 km; 230 mi) from the Israeli coast, while on its way from Turkey to El-Arish port in Egypt (other sources give the destination as Alexandria, Egypt). According to the IDF, the ship picked up the cargo in the Port of Latakia in Syria and sailed to Mersin, Turkey. The ship was intercepted by Israeli Navy missile ships, which radioed the captain and questioned him about his point of origin and planned destination, then informed him that his ship was suspected of carrying illegal cargo, and requested permission to board for an inspection. The captain agreed, and ordered the vessel stopped. Several minutes later, speedboats carrying commandos from Israel's elite naval unit, Shayetet 13, pulled alongside the ship. A ladder was dropped for them to climb aboard. The commandos boarded with their weapons at the ready out of concern that there could be Iranian or Hamas operatives on board. The commandos ordered the crew to assemble on the bridge, and then began inspecting the cargo. The IDF said the ship's crew was unaware it was carrying concealed weapons. The ship was redirected to the Ashdod base for further inspection. After the contraband was unloaded, Israel announced it would release the Victoria and allowed it to continue its journey to the Egyptian port of Alexandria.

=== Operation Protective Edge ===
During the 2014 Gaza War, Shayetet 3 off-shore fleet fired 3,494 naval shells, into the Gaza Strip which was coordinated from this base.

=== Gaza war ===
During the Gaza war, an estimated 35 fighters of Hamas' Nukhba unit were observed crossing into Israeli waters from the Gaza fishing zone during the Zikim attack. Col. Eitan Paz, commander of the Ashdod naval base, having been forewarned of the invasion by Gaza Division commander Avi Rosenfeld earlier in the morning, immediately ordered the forces under his command to defend the Israeli maritime border and prevent raids on the coast.

Israeli sources stated that three of the boats were destroyed by patrol boats of the Israeli Navy's 916th Patrol Squadron from Ashdod naval base before they reached the shore, and sailors of the Snapir unit, the Israeli Navy's protection and harbor security unit, subsequently moved in on Defender-class boats and killed the survivors as well as Hamas divers they discovered with gunfire and depth charges. However, the remaining boat soon made it to Zikim beach.

== Units ==
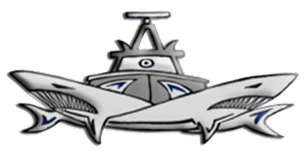
Logo of the 916 Squadron

The base is home to the 916th Patrol Squadron a squadron of the navy's 15th Flotilla, which operates patrol boats. Its role is to provide mutual security - to continuously protect the country's maritime borders.The squadron operates Super Dvora Mk II-class patrol boats, Shaldag-class patrol boats and Unmanned surface vehicles.

The ships of the voyage are divided between four cruises, the Bezeq cruise, the Kasif cruise, the Trigon cruise, and the Shark cruise. Each cruise is commanded by naval officers with the rank of captain/major, a qualified vessel commander.

The navy's 11th Flotilla, its amphibious landing craft fleet, is based at Ashdod naval base following its reestablishment in 2022. The flotilla currently consists of two landing ships intended for use in amphibious landings and transporting supplies.

In addition, elements of the navy's Snapir unit, the harbor security unit, are also stationed at the base.

== Commanders ==
Ashdod base commanders
name	command period	Development and special events	Photo
Yokutiel Netz	May July 1967	Establishment	
Baruch Brushi	August 1967 – September 1969	War of Attrition	
Michael Barkai	September 1969 – August 1971		
Dov Ram	August 1971 – March 1973		
Eitan Lipschitz	March 1973 – March 1974	Yom Kippur War	
Joseph Elder	March 1974 – September 1976		
Mousa Levy	September 1976 – December 1978		1975
Arya Marmari	December 1978 – July 1979		
Abraham Ashur	July 1979 – July 1982		
Ami Elon	July 1982 – September 1984		
Alex Tal	September 1984 – July 1987		
Uzi Livnat	July 1987 – July 1989		
Yossi Levi	July 1989 – May 1990		
Haim Gaesh	May 1990 - July 1992		
Cypress tree	July 1992 – August 1994		
Nir Maor	August 1994 – September 1996		
Zev Yanovsky	September 1996 – November 1998		
Slomo Frommer	November 1998 – March 2001		
Daniel Maoz	March 2001 – February 2003		
Menachem Levi	February 2003 – September 2005		
Yoram Lex	September 2005 – August 2008	Operation Summer Rains and Operation Warm Winter	
Yaron Levy	August 2008 – February 2010	Operation Cast Lead	
David Sa'ar Selma	February 2010 – August 2011		
Dror Friedman	August 2011 – March 2014		
Ido Ben-Moshe	March 2014-April 2016		
Guy Goldferb	April 2016 – July 2017		
Yoval Eilon	July 2017 – September 2019		שמאל
Amir Gutman	September 2019 – September 2021		
Eli Sohulitsky	September 2021 – August 2023		
Eitan Paz	August 2023 – Present		

== Sources ==
- Batia Shem-El, בסיס חיל הים באשדוד, 'Between Waves' October 1975, p. 22.
- Shay Bandman, "'Time goes by fast here,'" on the control posts Erez and Tel Ridan, "Between Waves" July 1984, pp. 41–43.
- "'Ashdod 18 years'" - the story of the Ashdod base, between the waves, April 1986.
- Annie El Roei, Raviv Hadar and David Bar-בסיס לנוכח האויב - הקמת בסיס אשדוד, "Marine Systems" 86–85, July 1967, pp. 24–25.
- Uri Porat, בסיס אשדוד, 'Marine Systems' 104, July 1971, pp. 32–33.
- P. courage, על אנשים, ספינות ומלח – בסיס עין גדי, 'Marine Systems' 107–108, March 1972, p. 36.
- Orly Azoulai, חיל הים באגם המר, 'Between Waves' December 1973, p. 8.
- Orly Azoulai, על אנשים ספינות ומלח, 'Between Waves' April 1975, p. 18.
- Shlomo Man, סימן חיים בים המוות - בסיס עין גדי, 'Between Waves' March 159, 1983, p. 22.
- Shay Bandman, הזמן עובר פה מהר - יומיים בתחנות המכם הדרומיות, 'Between Waves' 162 July 1984 p. 41.
- Shlomo Man, מוסף מיוחד - ח"י לאשדוד, 'Between Waves' 167 April 1986 p. 25.
- Ruthie Rodner, נחה עליהם הרוח וגרמה להן להתקשר למצוף באשדוד, ' Galim. 170-171 June 1987, p. 23.
- Ruthie Rodner and Sigal Buchris, מ' על המים - מ' שנים לחיל הים - עצרת יום חיל הים תשמ"ח בקיסריה וגם יום החיל באשדוד, "Between Waves" 176 October 1988 pp. 1 and 4
- Sigal Buchris, ימי קרב בסיס אשדוד, 'Between Waves' 177 April 1989 p. 11.
- Sigal Buchris, בסיס אשדוד, 'Between Waves' 180 April 1990 p. 6.
- Ido Laur, הגבול הכי חם של ישראל, "Between Waves", 10, July 2006, p. 44.
- Nir Kosti, מח"ט הים מפקד בסיס אשדוד ירון בעופרת יצוקה, "Between Waves", May 2009, p. 42
- Tal Hefer and Rose Barel, חדשות חיל ים: מועדון חיילים חדש בבסיס אשדוד, Contributed by the Goldberg family of Toronto "Between Waves", December 2009, p. 12
- Raz Sharga, Ari Shabiv, Nateel Bandel and Rose Barel, "'Quiet takeover of the "provocation flotilla" and also "'Trends of dealing with maritime terrorism' and also "'Talking about the flotilla'", "Bin Galim", October 2010, pp. 36, 37 and 40
- Dario Nitzan יחידת הברטרמים באשדוד ובים המלח July 15, 2015 at the website of the Maritime Heritage Conservancy
- Annie Elroy, מבצע צוק איתן: עזה באחריותנו 24/7, וגם העיניים היפות של הגזרה, "Between Waves", October 2014, p. 33
- Dawn as a window, בסיס חיל הים אירח תלמידי ישיבות ההסדר Article in Ashdodent December 27, 2016
