= Shayetet 15 =

- פלגות הבט"ש
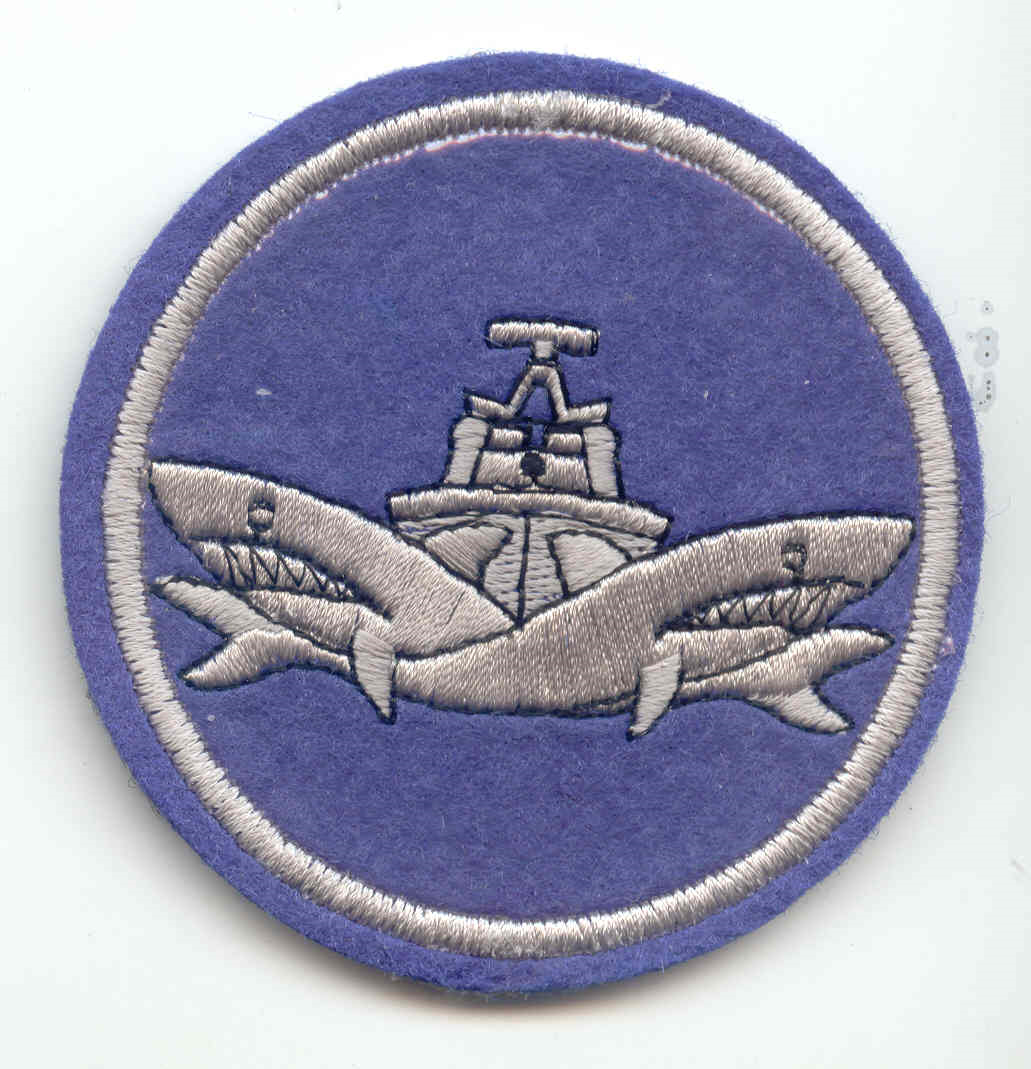
- Logo of the Flotilla
- Active: 1948 - 1970 (as Shayetet 5); 1970 - present (as Shayetet 15)
- Country: Israel
- Branch: Israeli Navy
- Type: Maritime Patrol Squadron
- Role: Maritime Bombardment; Amphibious raids Maritime Patrolling; Anti-Smuggling operations
- Part of: Israeli Navy
- Garrison/HQ: Israeli Naval Headquarters
- Nickname: Betash

The Patrol Fleet, officially designated Shayetet 15 (formerly the Torpedo Fleet or Shayetet 5), serves as the naval patrol fleet of the Israeli Navy. Headquartered at the Israeli Naval Headquarters in Tel Aviv, the fleet operates three squadrons: Squadron 914 at Haifa Naval Base, Squadron 915 (formerly Squadron 912) at Eilat Naval Base, and Squadron 916 (formerly Squadron 913) at Ashdod Naval Base.

== Fleet ==
Class	Photo	Number of ships	Commissioned	Origin	Notes
Dvora, [dvo̞ˈʁa] (Bee)		9	1988	Israel	
Super Dvora Mk II, [suˈpe̞ʁ dvo̞ˈʁa]		2	1996	Israel	
Super Dvora Mk III		13	2004	Israel	
Shaldag, [ʃalˈdaɡ] (Kingfisher)		5	1989	Israel	
Defender		9	2002	Israel	
Rafael Protector USV		N/A	2000s	Israel	Unmanned Naval Patrol Vehicles
Silver Marlin		N/A	2006?	Israel	USV Naval Patrol Vehicles

== Personnel and training ==
Patrol ships are crewed by approximately 12 soldiers each. Command of a vessel is held by a captain, who holds the rank of lieutenant or captain (Hebrew: Segen or Séren). To qualify for this role, the captain must have previously served as a deputy platoon officer in the BHD 600 (the Israeli Navy's training base) and completed training as the vessel's deputy commander. Captains typically serve in this role for 18 months before promotion.

Crew members are selected during pre-enlistment and serve as regular-service soldiers in the Israeli Navy. After completing second-gunner training at the BHD 600, personnel are assigned to either sailor or mechanic specialization courses. Upon finishing their training, recruits undergo a "final stay" phase aboard ships, where they must pass basic certification tests to become full crew members.

Mechanics receive additional qualifications as ship's watchmen, firefighters, and enginemen, while sailors assume roles such as watchmen, navigators, gunners, and specialists in lighting, seamanship, and magistrate operations (shipboard administrative duties). Soldiers may also take advanced theoretical exams to qualify as non-commissioned commanders, enabling them to mentor junior crew and oversee ship operations.

During their service, select personnel may be offered enrollment in a combat medics course conducted at the naval hospital. Graduates return to their vessels as certified ship's medics, responsible for onboard medical care.

== Torpedo fleet ==
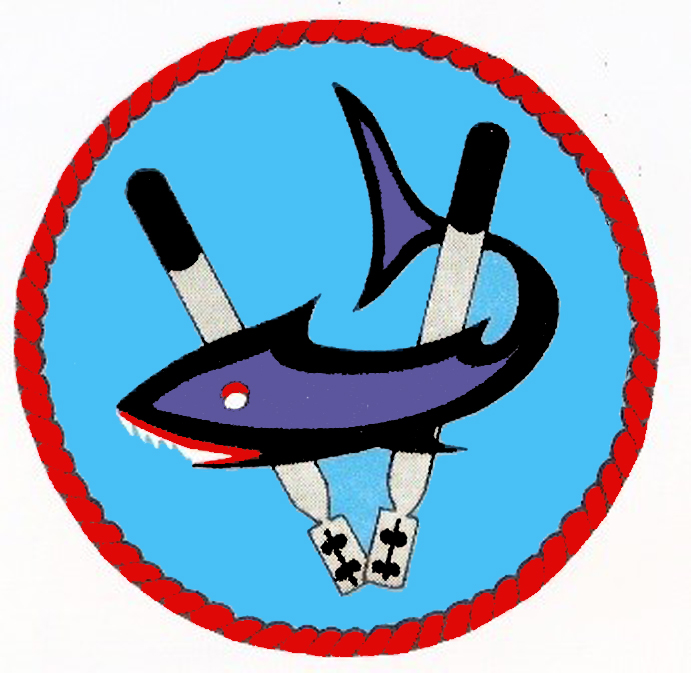
Logo of the Shayetet 5

The Torpedo Fleet, officially designated Shayetet 5, was the naval patrol and torpedo boat fleet of the Israeli Navy from 1948 to 1970. It operated Torpedo boats of various classes and was organized into four squadrons, including Squadron 788 for patrolling the Sea of Galilee. In 1970, the fleet was reorganized as Shayetet 15 (Patrol Fleet), with its squadrons absorbed into the new structure.

=== History ===
==== Establishment (1948–1952) ====
During the 1948 Arab–Israeli War, the Israeli Navy acquired a World War II-era German torpedo boat captured by the United States, purchasing it for $9,000. The vessel sank en route to Israel near Malta. In 1949, an unarmed torpedo boat joined the Small Flotilla, a unit including British-surplus patrol vessels and landing craft (later reorganized as Shayetet 11). By 1950, 12 additional torpedo boats were acquired: eight WWII-era vessels from the United Kingdom and four modern French boats. The unit was formally renamed Shayetet 5 in 1952.

==== Operations and Expansion (1953–1967) ====
In 1956, three Italian-built torpedo boats were stationed at Eilat Naval Base, followed by three French vessels at Haifa Naval Base in 1957.

===== Shelling of Kinneret (1955) =====
Syrian forces harassed Israeli fishermen on the Sea of Galilee, prompting Shayetet 5 to bombard Syrian positions. The engagement resulted in Syrian casualties, one Israeli soldier wounded, and a damaged 57 mm cannon replaced post-action.

===== Operation Resourcefulness (1956) =====
After the Suez Crisis, two Israeli torpedo boats disguised as Italian vessels covertly evacuated hundreds of Jews from Port Said, with French ships rescuing an additional 170.

===== Engagement at Sanafir (1957) =====
A Shayetet 5 vessel patrolling near Sanafir Island was mistaken for an attacker by Saudi forces, triggering an exchange of fire. The Israeli boat struck a Saudi coastal battery, inflicting casualties.

===== Beirut reconnaissance mission (1958) =====
On July 9–10, 1958 the Shayetet 13 personnel were dispatched to carry out a reconnaissance mission in Beirut, but their extraction proved to be a difficult task for which the Torpedo Fleet had to be mobilized.

==== Reorganisation ====
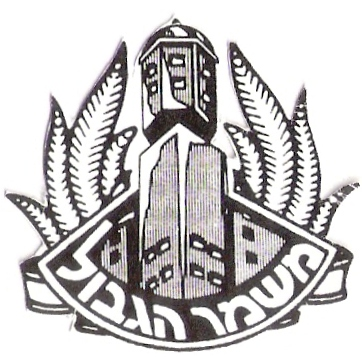
Logo of Autonomous Squadron 788 tasked with patrolling Sea of Galilee

In 1958, the Torpedo Fleet was organised into four squadrons: Squadron 718 in the Sea of Galilee, Squadron 912 at Eilat Naval Base, Squadron 913 at Ashdod Naval Base, and Squadron 914 at Haifa Naval Base.

==== Voyages to Cyprus and Greece ====
The Torpedo Fleet made voyages to maintain a presence in the shipping lanes in the Eastern Mediterranean. The fleet sailed every summer to visit destinations in the Mediterranean. In order to practice long-range activity. The main destinations were Cyprus and Crete.

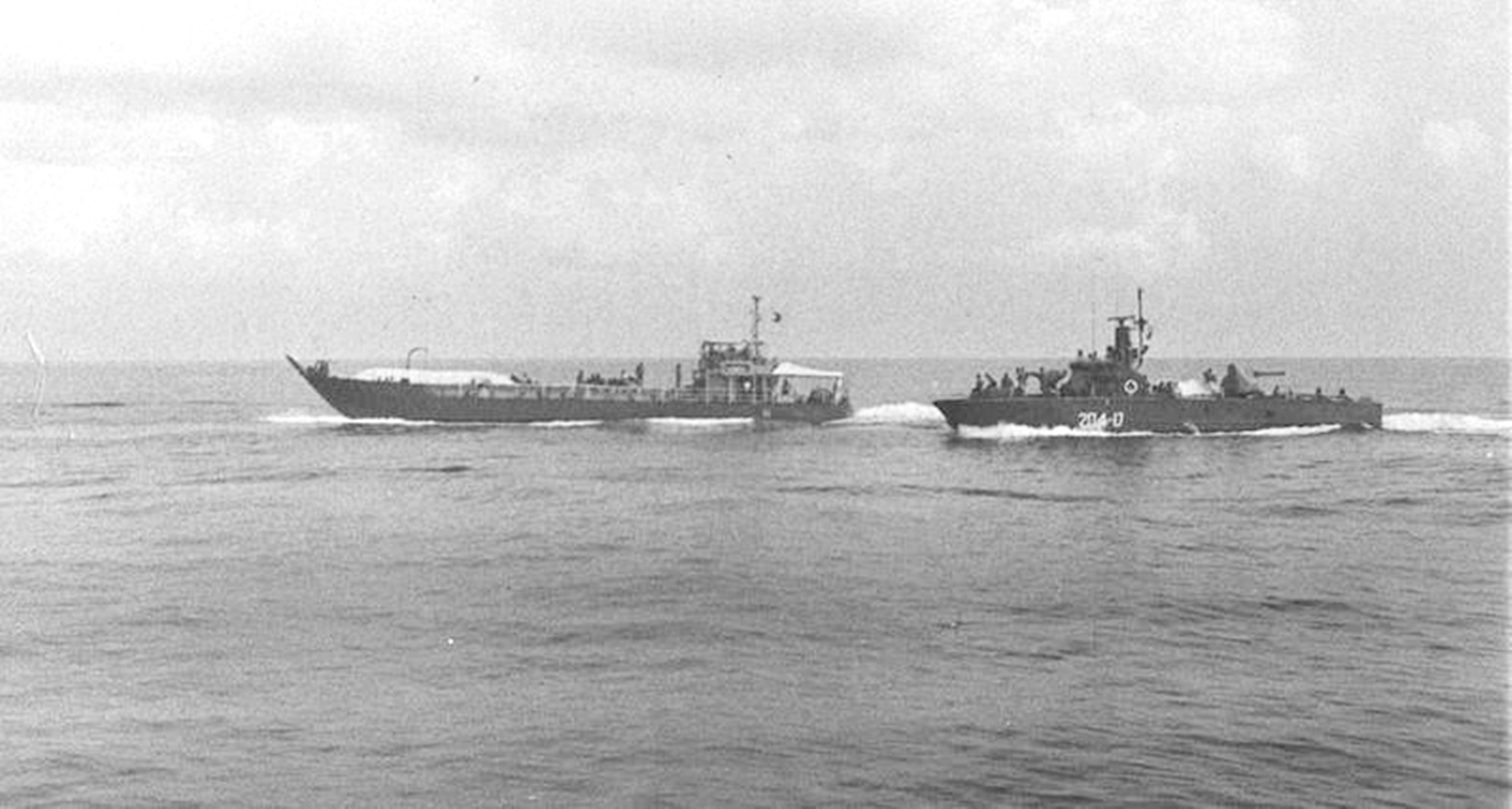
T-204 visiting Cyprus

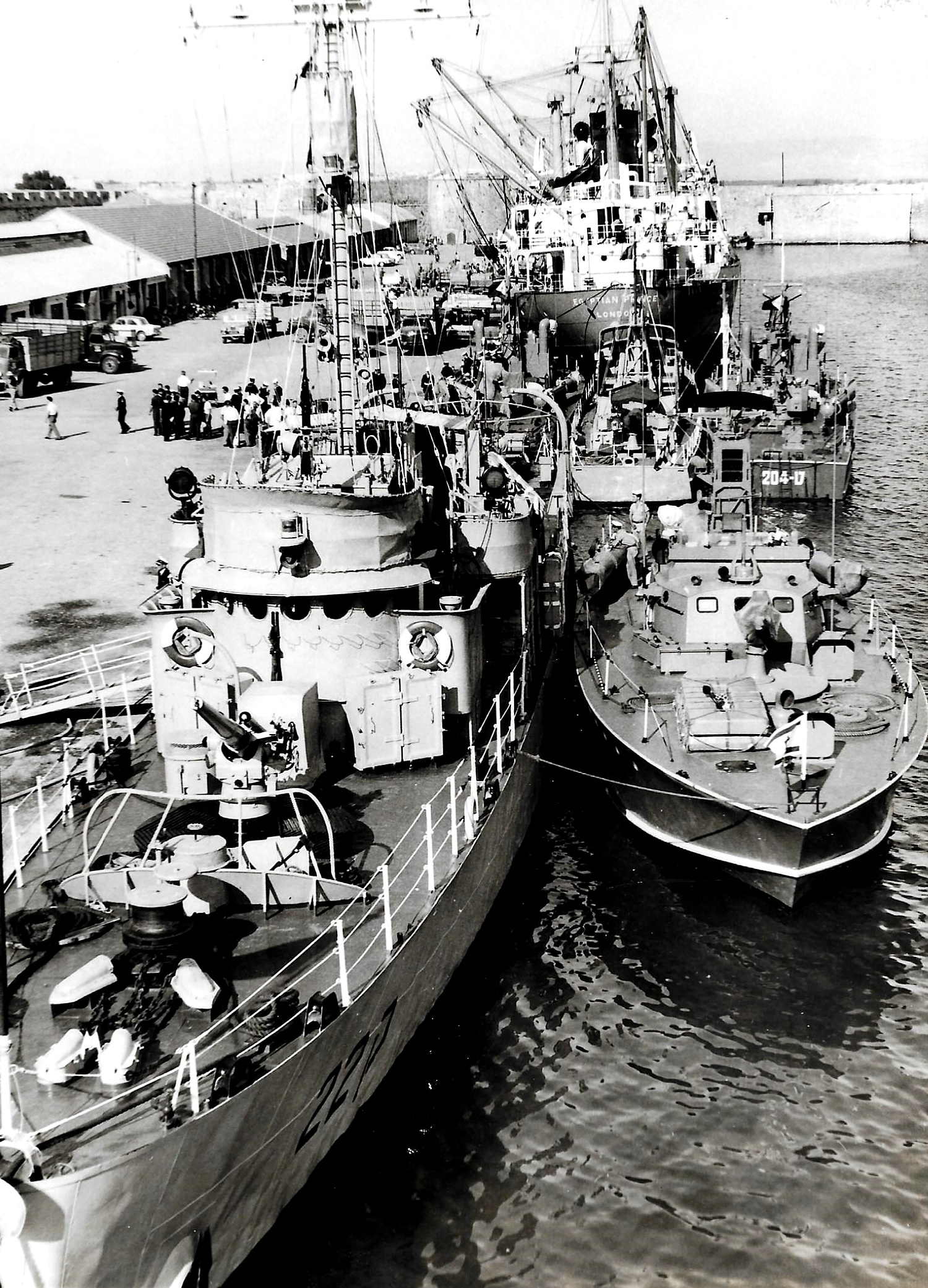
Torpedo boats and INS Noga in Famagusta

==== Six-Day War (1967) ====
===== Operation Lady =====
During Operation Lady in Port Said, the two torpedo boats accompanying the attack force attacked two Osa-type Egyptian vessels that were moving near the port. The commander of the force, Benjamin Talm, received a report from the T-207 torpedo boat that it was "low on fuel" and ordered the boat not to attack. The Egyptians also didn't attack the torpedo boats.

===== USS Liberty incident =====
Three vessels of the fleet were involved in the attack on USS Liberty. When the torpedo boats arrived, Commander Oren could see that the ship could not be the destroyer that had supposedly shelled Arish or any ship capable of 30 knots (56 km/h) speed. According to Michael Limor, an Israeli naval reservist serving on one of the torpedo boats, they attempted to contact the ship by heliograph and radio, but received no response. Oren consulted an Israeli identification guide to Arab fleets and concluded the ship was the Egyptian supply ship El Quseir, based on observing its deckline, midship bridge, and smokestack. The captain of boat T-203 independently reached the same conclusion. The boats moved into battle formation, but did not attack.

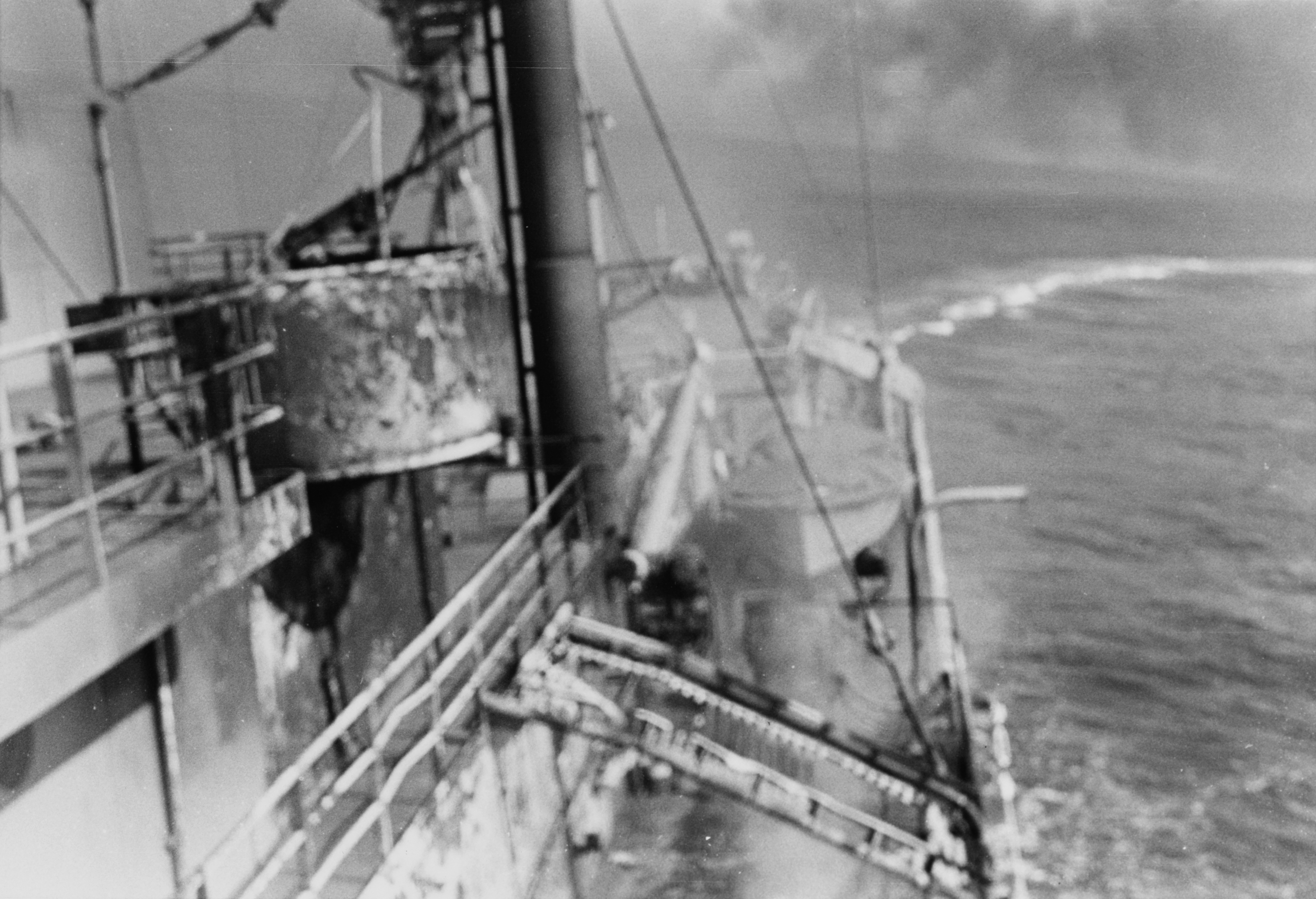
Liberty turns to evade Israeli torpedo boats

As the torpedo boats rapidly approached, Liberty's captain, Commander William L. McGonagle, ordered a sailor to proceed to machine gun Mount 51 and open fire. However, he then noticed that the boats appeared to be flying an Israeli flag, and "realized that there was a possibility of the aircraft having been Israeli and the attack had been conducted in error". McGonagle ordered the man at gun mount 51 to hold fire, but a short burst had been fired at the torpedo boats before the man understood the order.

McGonagle observed that machine gun Mount 53 began firing at the center torpedo boat at about the same time gun mount 51 fired, and that its fire was "extremely effective and blanketed the area and the center torpedo boat". Machine gun mount 53 was located on the starboard amidships side, behind the pilot house. McGonagle could not see or "get to mount 53 from the starboard wing of the bridge". So, he "sent Mr. Lucas around the port side of the bridge, around to the skylights, to see if he could tell [Seaman] Quintero, whom [he] believed to be the gunner on Machine gun 53, to hold fire". Lucas "reported back in a few minutes in effect that he saw no one at mount 53". Lucas, who had left the command bridge during the air attack and returned to assist McGonagle, believed that the sound of gunfire was likely from ammunition cooking off, due to a nearby fire. Previously, Lucas had granted a request from Quintero to fire at the torpedo boats, before heat from a nearby fire chased him from gun mount 53. McGonagle later testified, at the Court of Inquiry, that this was likely the "extremely effective" firing event he had observed.

After coming under fire, the torpedo boats returned fire with their cannons, killing Liberty's helmsman. The torpedo boats then launched five torpedoes at the Liberty. At 12:35Z (14:35 local time) one torpedo hit Liberty on the starboard side, forward of the superstructure, creating a 39 ft (12 m) wide hole in what had been a cargo hold converted to the ship's research spaces and killing 25 servicemen, almost all of them from the intelligence section, and wounding dozens.

The torpedo boats then closed in and strafed the ship's hull with their cannons and machine guns.

===== Assault on Sharm el-Sheikh =====
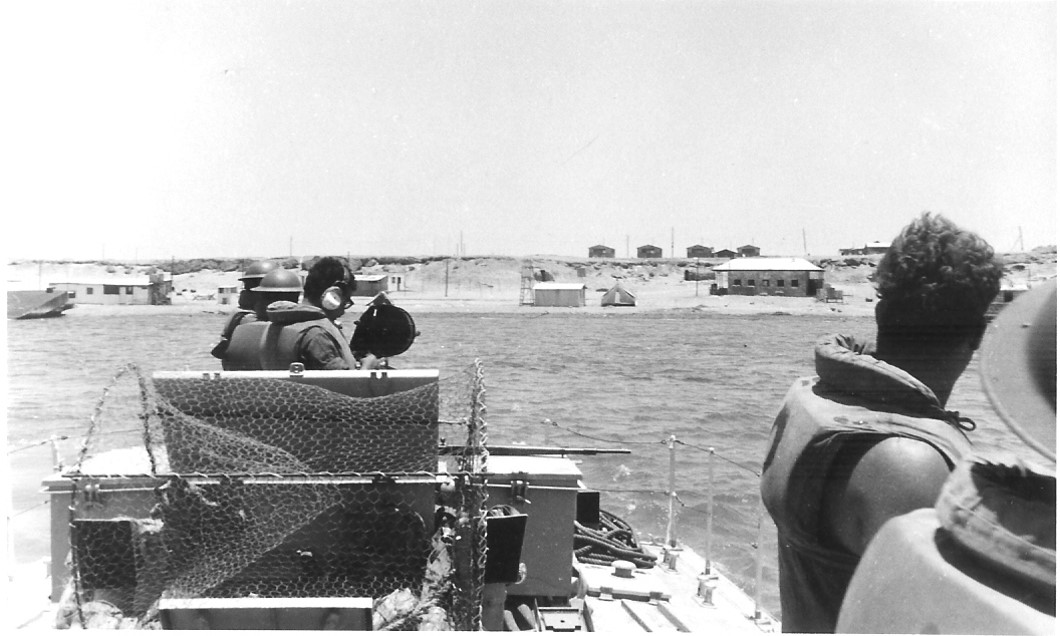
Torpedo boats entering Sharm el-Sheikh during the capture

The assault on Sharm el-Sheikh was to be carried out by paratroopers, but it was not clear whether the Egyptian artillery position in the area was manned or not. So torpedo boats had to accompany the assault. When the torpedo boats reached their objective, it became evident that the position was deserted. So the personnel of the torpedo boats themselves occupied the site and hoisted the Israeli flag. So, the Paratrooper assault was cancelled and forces were transported via helicopters. Furthermore, two Egyptian commando vessels were spotted by the torpedo boats after capturing Sharm el-Sheikh, the vessels were unarmed but carried 33 Egyptian commandos, who were taken captive.

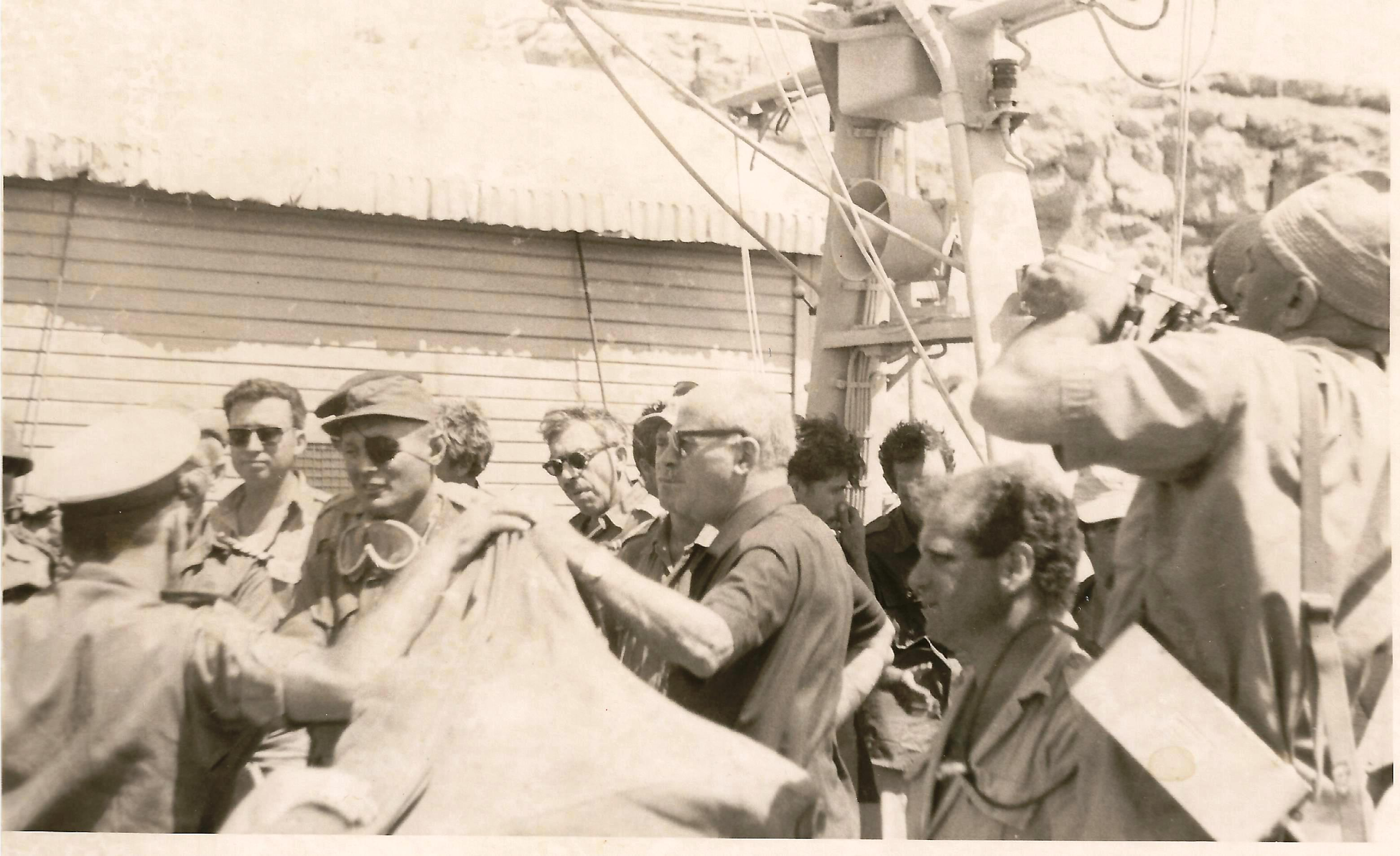
Israeli Defence Minister Moshe Dayan visits a torpedo boat stationed in Sharm el-Sheikh

==== War of Attrition (1967–1970) ====
===== Battle of Rumani Coast =====
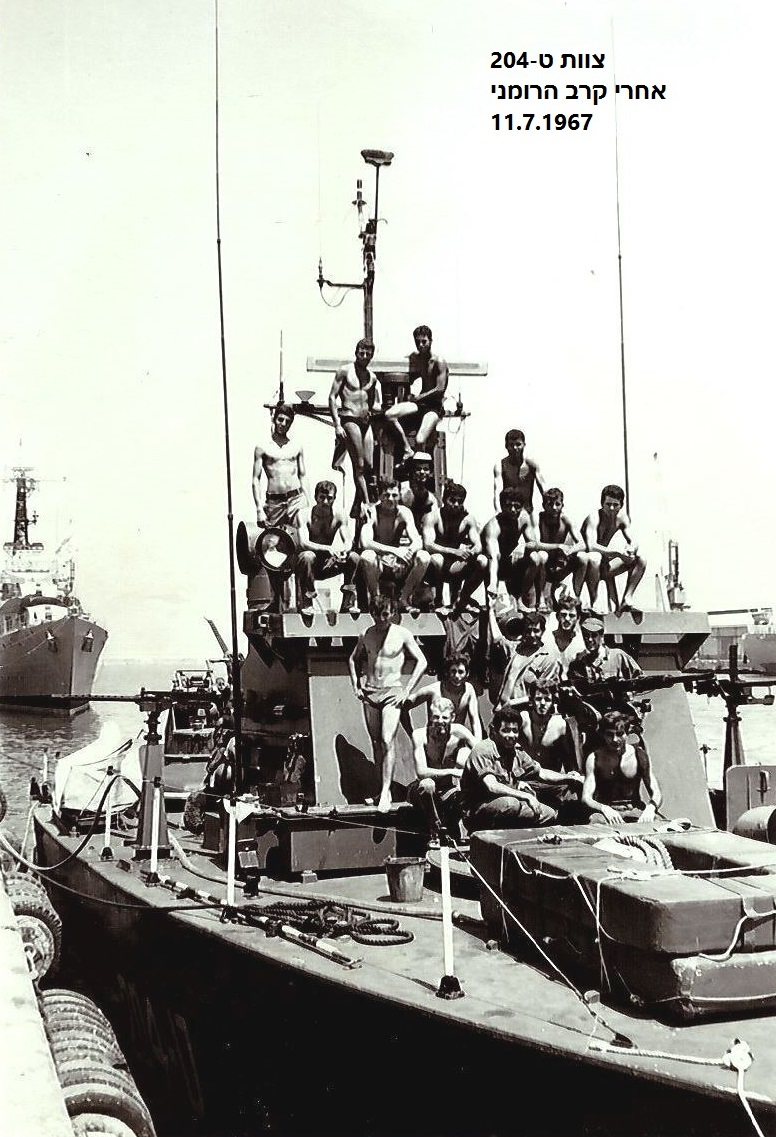
T-204 crew after the battle of Rumani coast

During the Battle of Rumani Coast, an Israeli destroyer, INS Eilat, along with two torpedo boats, attacked Egyptian P 6-class torpedo boats. The initial run scored no hits but the Egyptian boats dispersed. The separation enabled Eilat to close with one Egyptian torpedo boat and the two Israeli boats to close with the other. Twenty minutes later, both P 6s were ablaze; they later exploded, apparently leaving no survivors.

===== Sinking of INS Eilat =====
On October 21, 1967, Eilat was sunk near Port Said by Egyptian submarines. Torpedo boats were dispatched from Ashdod Naval Base to rescue the survivors. The first ship to arrive was the T-206, under the command of Rafi Apel. Her presence was essential for the coordination of the evacuation helicopters and the collection of the dead bodies.

===== Capture of a militant vessel =====
On November 3, 1969, the T-203 torpedo boat, under the command of David Nitzan, was on patrol off the coast of Rosh HaNkira. During the night, a small, dark target was discovered penetrating the border from north to south. The torpedo boat gave chase and opened fire at the target. Finally the target stopped. It was a boat carrying four Fatah militants, with explosives. The Fatah militants were arrested.

==== Disestablishment (1970) ====
Shayetet 5 was disbanded in 1970 and replaced by Shayetet 15. Squadron 788 (Sea of Galilee) was decommissioned after Israel secured full control of the coastline following the occupation of the Golan Heights.

=== Fleet ===
Torpedo vessels
Origin	Vessels	Type	Image	Weight (Tones)	! Length (meter)	Width (meter)	Submergence (meter)	Speed	Crew	Range	Armament
United States; Higgins Industries	INS Netz (T-200)	Gasoline operated		43	21.3	5.79	1.52	74 km/h	16	600 miles	3 Packard engines, Two torpedo tubes, Two Oerlikon 20 mm cannons
United Kingdom	INS Eagle (T-201); INS Ait (T-202); INS Diya (T-204); INS Tinshem (T-212)	Gasoline operated	INS Eagle INS Diya	43	22.10	5.79	1.52	74 km/h	15	500 miles	3 Packard engines, 1,350 horsepower, 3 propellers, two 18 inch torpedoes, three 20 mm cannons
United Kingdom	INS Aya (T-203); INS Sheldag (T-209); INS Lilit (T-210); INS Yanshof (T-211)	Gasoline operated	INS Sheldag INS Litit INS Yanshof	43	22.10	5.79	1.52	74 km/h	15	500 miles	3 Packard engines, 1,350 horsepower 3 propellers, two 18 inch torpedoes, one 57 mm cannon and two 20 mm cannons
France	INS Baz (T-205); INS Thams (T-206); INS Peres (T-207); INS Yas'ur (T-208)	Gasoline operated	INS Baz INS Thams INS Peres INS Yas'ur	62	26.5	6.31	1.52	78 km/h	15	965 km	4 Junkers Yomo engines, two torpedo tubes, three 20 mm cannons, Deca 2 radar
France	INS Aya (T-203); INS Diya (T-204)	Diesel operated	INS Aya INS Diya	44	26.5	6.31	1.52	70 km/h	15	965 km	Two Napier Delta engines, two propellers, two torpedo tubes, one 40 mm cannon, two 20 mm cannon, two 0.5 inch machine guns, Calvin Hughes radar
Italy	INS Ophir (T-150); INS Sheba (T-151); INS Tarshish (T-152)	Gasoline operated	INS Ophir INS Sheba INS Tarshish	?	16	5	1.20	74 km/h	12	800 km	Two Packard 71 engines, two propellers, two torpedo tubes, one 40 mm cannon, two 20 mm cannons, two 0.5 inch machine guns, Deca radar

Other vessels
Name	Origin	Image
INS Haporzin 17	Purchased from Italy	
INS Palmach 19	Transferred from British to Israeli Navy in Haifa, used for special operations.	
INS Dror 21	Transferred from British to Israeli Navy in Haifa	
INS Sa'ar 23	Transferred from British to Israeli Navy in Haifa.	
INS Galia		
INS Tirzah 35	Purchased indirectly from the United Kingdom	
Albatross	A gift from Prime Minister of Italy to Prime Minister of Israel David Ben-Gurion	
Crostella	A gift for the President of Israel from the United States.	

== Squadron 914 ==
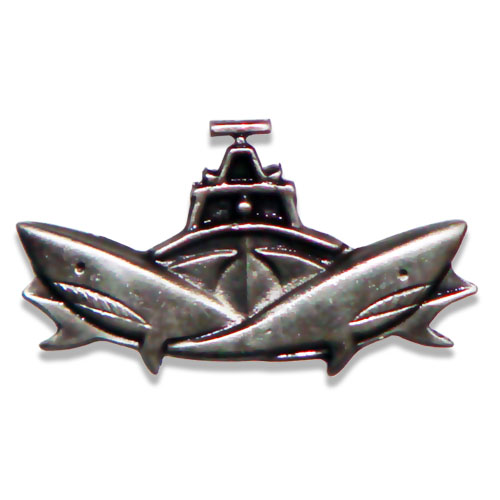
Logo of the Squadron

Squadron 914 is a naval patrol squadron at the Haifa naval base. It is currently divided into two patrols: the Peres patrol, and the Yesur patrol (in the past there was also an Eagle patrol). In addition, there is also a Snapir unit.

=== History ===
==== 1972 Lebanon ambush ====
In June 1972, near the Lebanon Coast, Shayetet 13 ship Dvor 883, under the command of Dan Rabin and senior commander in the area Eli Levi, and INS Sa'ar, under the command of Zvi Yanai, carried out an ambush of a militant boat that was destroyed.

==== Yom Kippur War ====
On October 16, 1973, two Dvor ships were used for rescue and transport for the force of Shayetet 13 participating in Operation Lady. From October 17–20 off the coast of Beirut, vessels of Unit 707 of Shayetet 7, along with two Bees, sabotaged enemy maritime communication lines.

==== Warehouse explosion ====
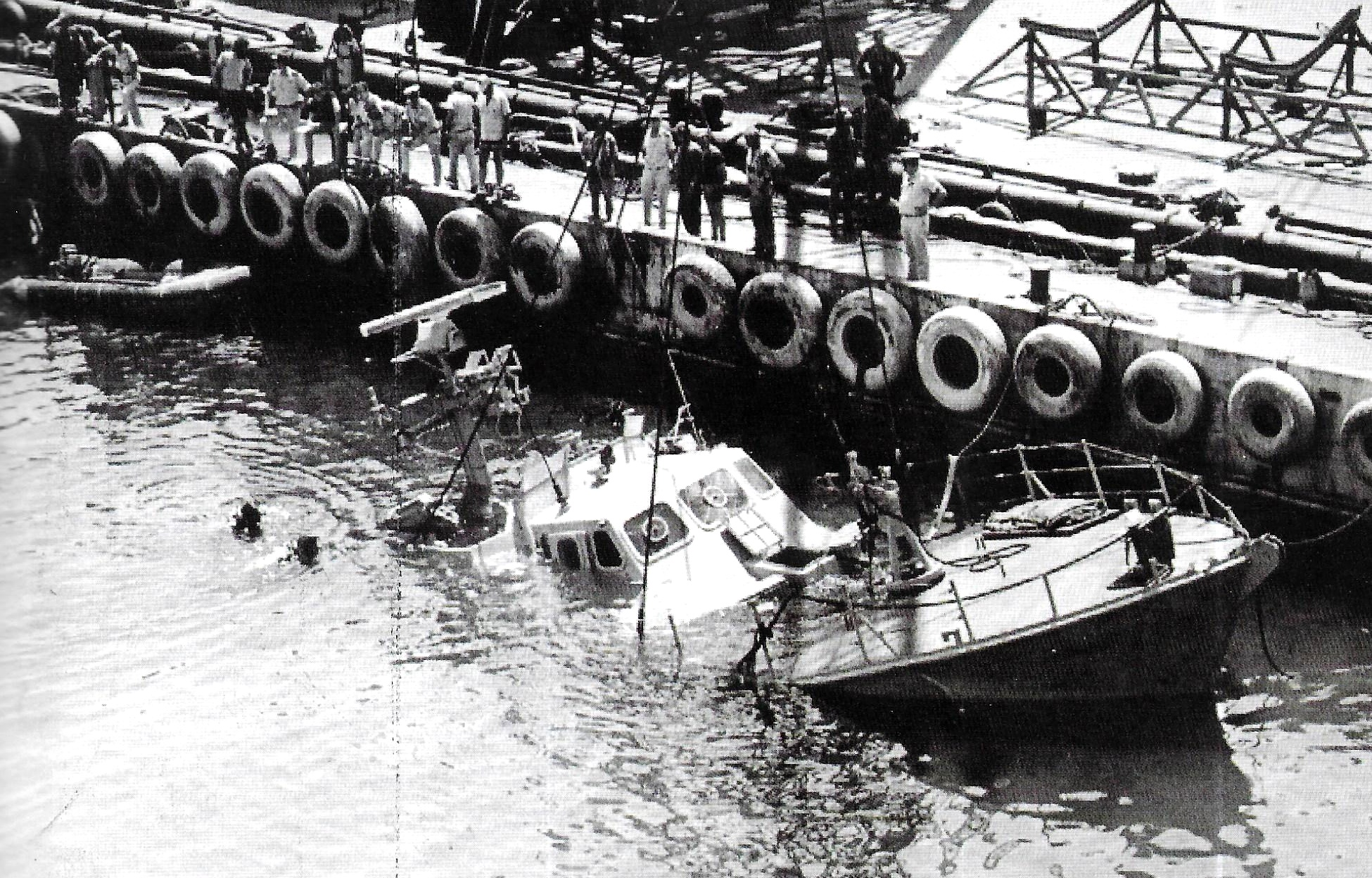
Aftermath of the explosion of Dvor 862

On June 7, 1978, in the Haifa naval base an explosion in the wheelhouse of Dvor 862, as a result of hydraulic oil vapors from the steering system or fuel leakage from the rubber boat tanks, killed Corporal Rafi Malka

==== Operations against militant vessels ====
On August 9, 1974, in southern Lebanon in front of the Port of Tzur, a Dvor boat of the squadron destroyed a militant boat. On June 3–4, 1979, near Rosh HaNkira, a militant boat targeting the coastal radar was captured by a Bee. On August 17–18, 1979 in the sector of Ras al-Bayada a militant boat was captured. On November 18, 1979, three Bees under the control of Colonel Moshe Oron chased, and Bee 853 under the command of Eran Osherov destroyed, a militant boat.

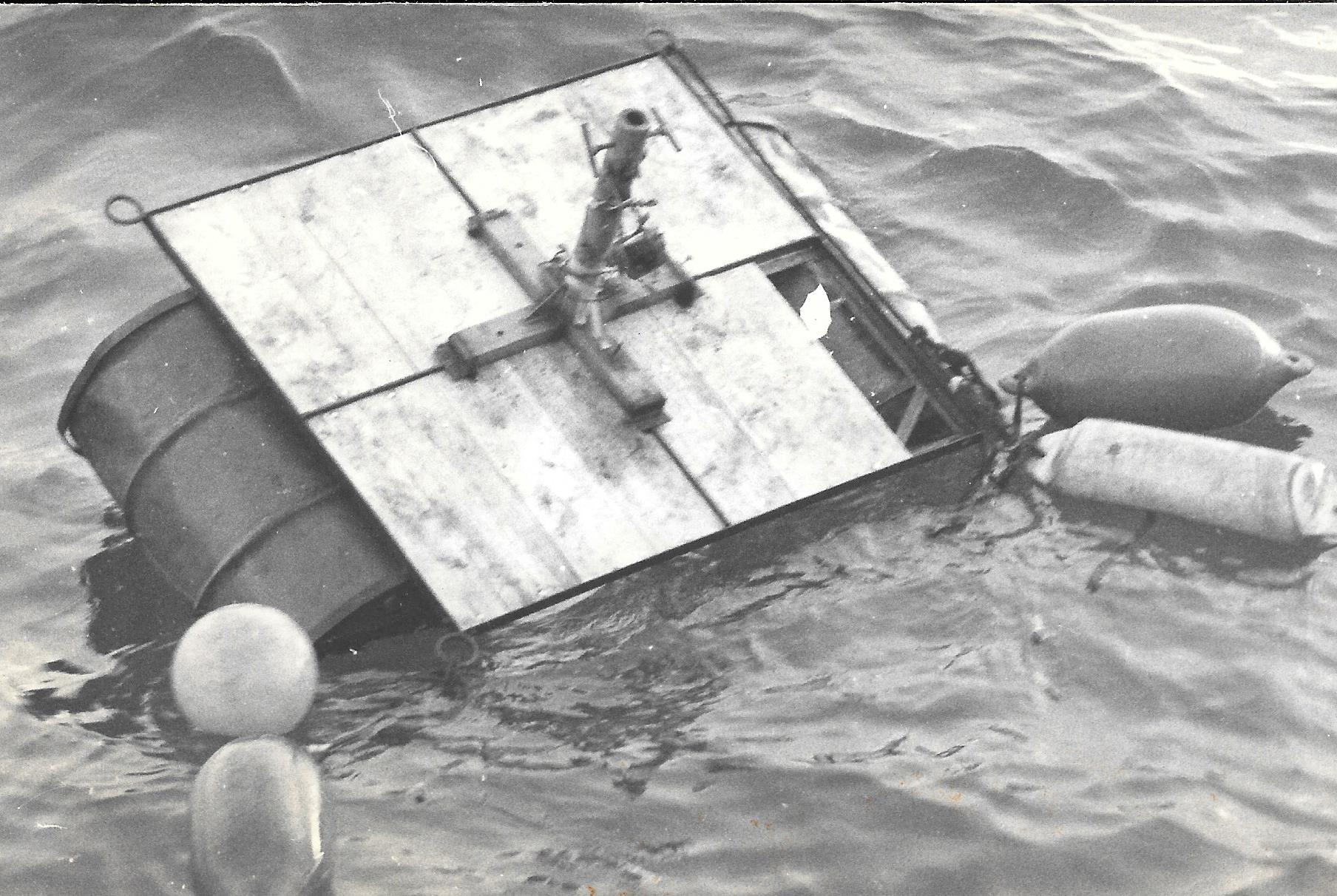
Rocket boat captured from militants by the squadron in 1979

On June 16, 1980, near Rosh HaNkira, a fast terrorist boat trying to penetrate from Lebanon was discovered by the control control and intercepted by Dvor 894 under the command of Dan Rabin. A militant fired a missile that hit the Dvor. Two wounded, one moderately injured, were evacuated by helicopter. The three militants were killed.

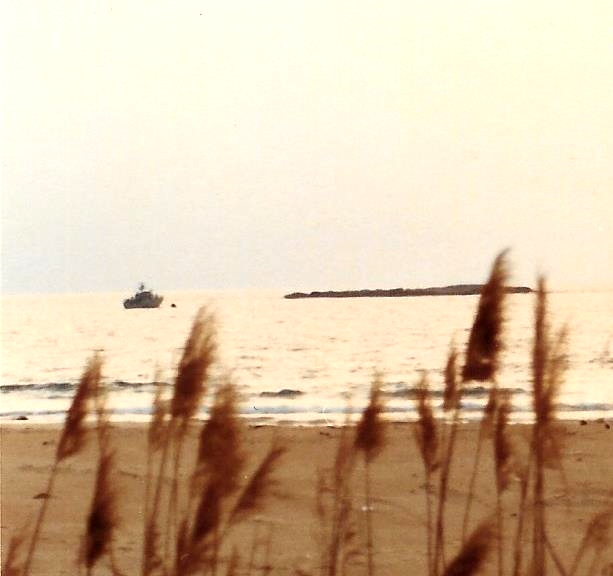
Squadron vessels patrolling in front of Rosh HaNkira

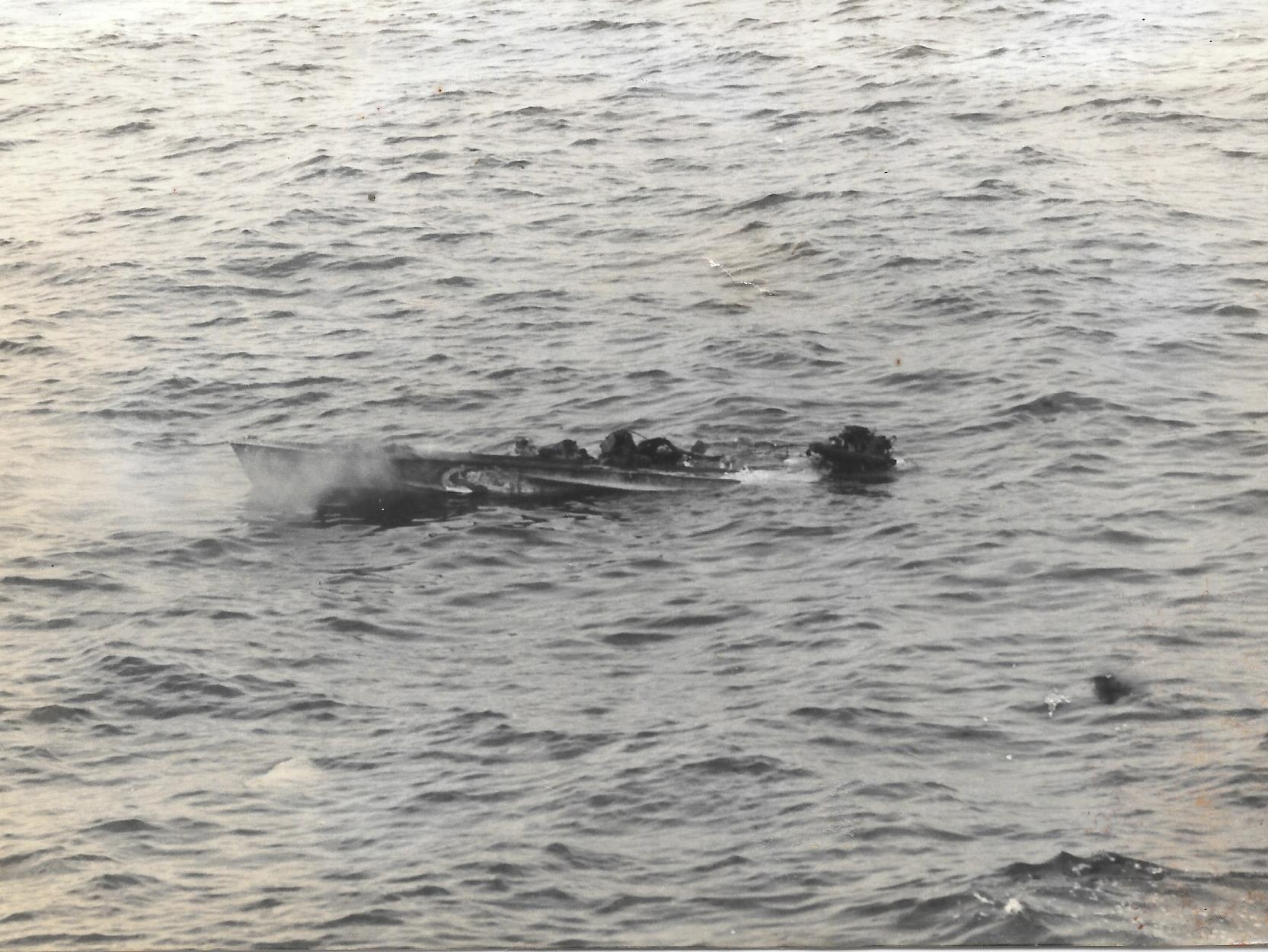
Militant boat destroyed by the squadron in June 1980

On September 23, 1984, in front of the Sidon beach, at 5:30, Dvor team 853, under the command of Lieutenant Yehiel Klusky, noticed that some militants were trying to penetrate. In an exchange of fire with IDF soldiers on the beach, 3 militants were killed and several were captured. On October 19, 1984, near the Coast of South Lebanon, a Dvor blocked a militant boat, killing two militants in an exchange of fire.

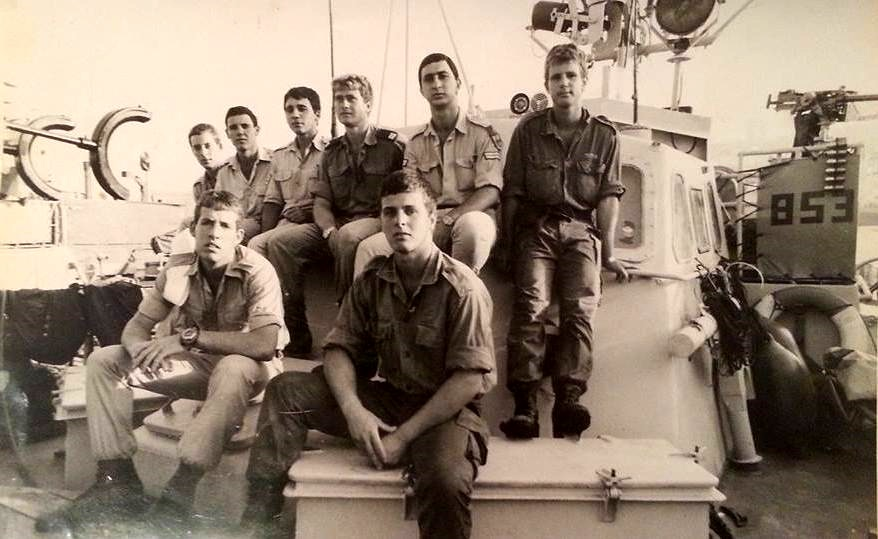
Dvora 853 crew after successfully blocking a militant boat on 23 September 1984

On August 26, 1985, about 14 miles west of Sidon, a militant yacht was captured.

On July 10, 1986, on the coast of Rosh HaNkira a rubber boat with militants from the Popular Front for the Liberation of Palestine was discovered by Devor 852 under the command of Idan. In an exchange of fire, two IDF soldiers were killed and eleven were wounded. Meanwhile the four militants were killed, and their boat was destroyed. On September 10, 1986, about five kilometers north of Tzur, INS Moladat, commanded by Noam Feig, with Dvora 881, commanded by Micah Shitkin, with the help of combat helicopters, discovered a rubber boat 600 meters from the beach of Mint Abu Zeid and fired at it. Some of the militants were injured and the rest managed to escape on the boat to the shore.

On December 10, 1987, in the area of the Litani estuary the Dvora 894 ship, under the command of Eran Shor, destroyed a militant ship. During the encounter, Sergeant Major Amit Sela was killed

On December 4, 1988, between Cyprus and Lebanon, a Dvora boat stopped the ship Hassan which was involved in the transfer of militants from Cyprus to Lebanon.

On April 8, 1989, off the coast of Southern Lebanon a militant boat was destroyed by Dvora 810 under the command of Ido Ram. On October 30, 1989, near the coast of South Lebanon the ship Dvora 811 under the command of Lieutenant Danny Naor, encountered a militant boat that was on its way to an attack in Israel and destroyed it. On November 13, 1989, in the waters of Southern Lebanon an attempted attack on the ship Dvora 811, under the command of Dani Naor, by a Lebanese fishing boat, was thwarted.

On June 23, 1990, southwest of Tyre, a militant boat that was on its way to the attack was destroyed by Deborah 811, under the command of Dani Naor. On July 31, 1990, in front of Rashidiya, Dvora 811, under the command of Dani Naor, discovered a fast boat with armed militants on it. On 5 September 1990, near Sidon INS Reshef (Saar 4), under the command of Aryeh Nagler, and Dvora 816, under the command of Dani Amir, captured a militant from a ferry.

On July 10, 1994, near Ras al Bayda Dvora 813, under the command of Boris Vossler, killed two militants of the Hezbollah who were on their way to carry out an attack.

==== 2006 Lebanon War ====
On July 14, 2006 INS Hanit was damaged by a Hezbollah rocket and a Davor boat of the squadron destroyed a gas station.

=== Squadron 914 commanders ===
Name	Service	Note	Photo
Avraham Ben Zeev	1970–1971		
Amnon Gonen	1971–1972		
Michael Kisari	1972–1973	Yom Kippur War	
Dan Rabin	1973–1975		
Shmuel Sharig	1975–1977		
Ehud Savion	May 1977 – October 1977	The voyage included 11 Dvor ships	
Ami Shar-El	1977–1979		
Roni Icher	1979–1981		
Avi Shaaf	1981–1983		
Roni Peleg	1983–1985		
Ami Segev	1985–1987		
Zev Yanovsky	1987–1989		
Ilan Buchris	1989–1990		
Yaron Zahar	1990–1991		
Yitzhak Weinrev	1991–1993		
Yohai Ben Yosef	1993–1995		
Yoram Lex	1995–1997		
Yossi Shaf	1997–1999		
Yaron Levy	1999–2001		
Adi Grossbach	2001–2003		
Ilan Lavi	2003–2005		
Sami Tzemach	2005–2007	Second Lebanon War	
Yaniv Shahar	2007–2009		
Oren Nahabs	2009–2011		
Ariel Reznik	2017		
Zohar Cohen	2017–2019		
Kafir Raveh	2020–2022		
Dew Cohen	2022–2023		
Amir Yaniv	August 2023 – present		

== Squadron 915 ==
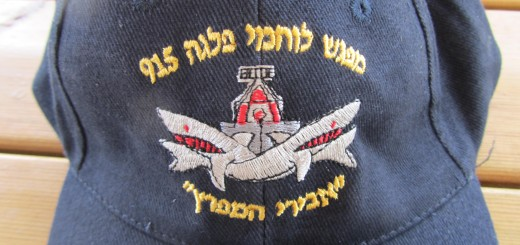
Cap with Insignia of the 915th Squadron

Squadron 915, also known as the Knights of the Gulf, is a patrol squadron at the Eilat Naval Base. It is focused on the security of merchant ships sailing to the Port of Eilat. Before the Egypt-Israel peace treaty it was deployed at Sharm el-Sheikh.

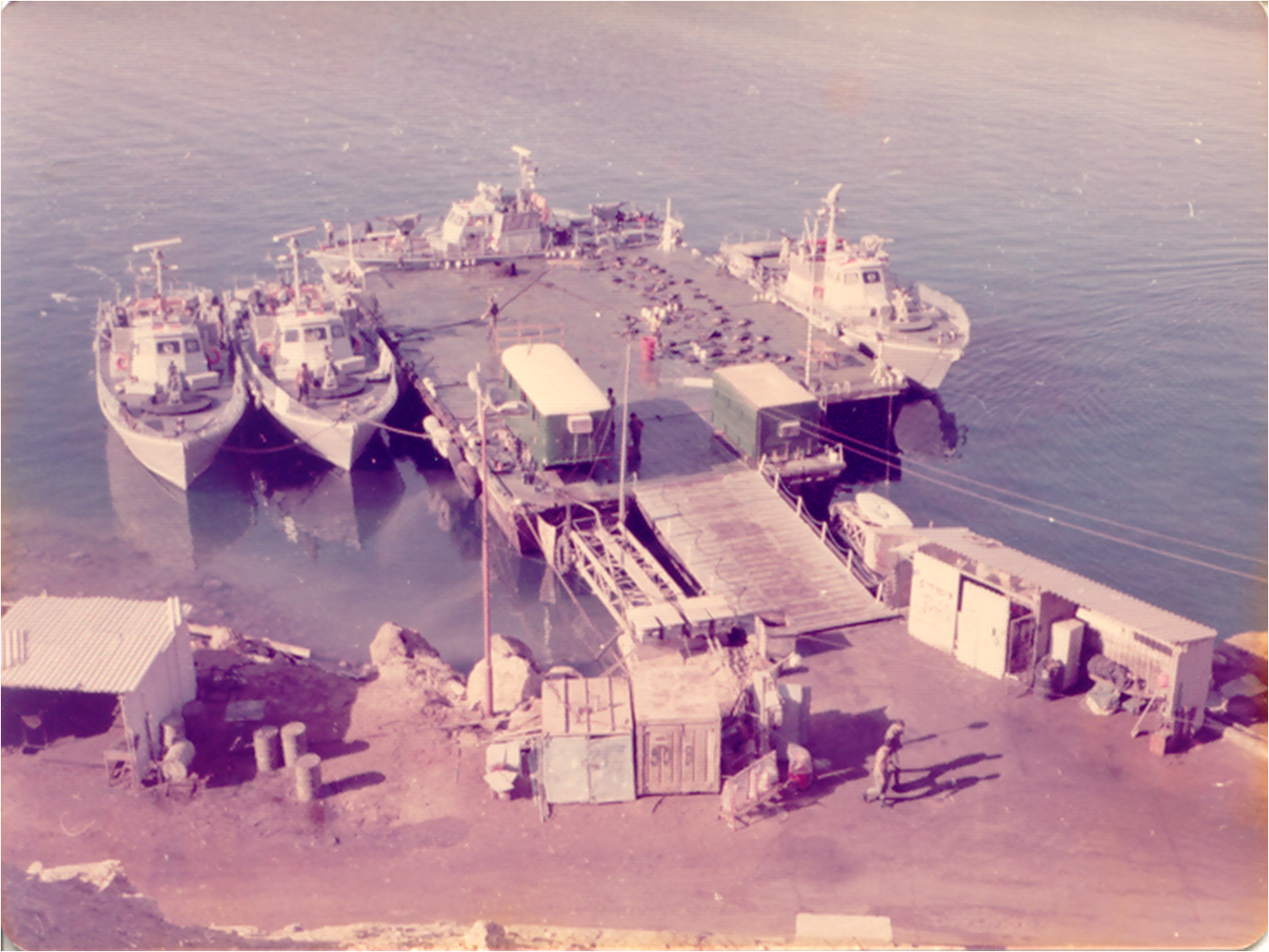
Squadron 915 in Sharm el-Sheikh

The main task of the squadron in Eilat is to maintain the security and peace of maritime waters of Eilat. The main activities in the city of Eilat are based on recreation and tourism, which include, among other things, about two hundred vessels moving in a relatively small maritime region.

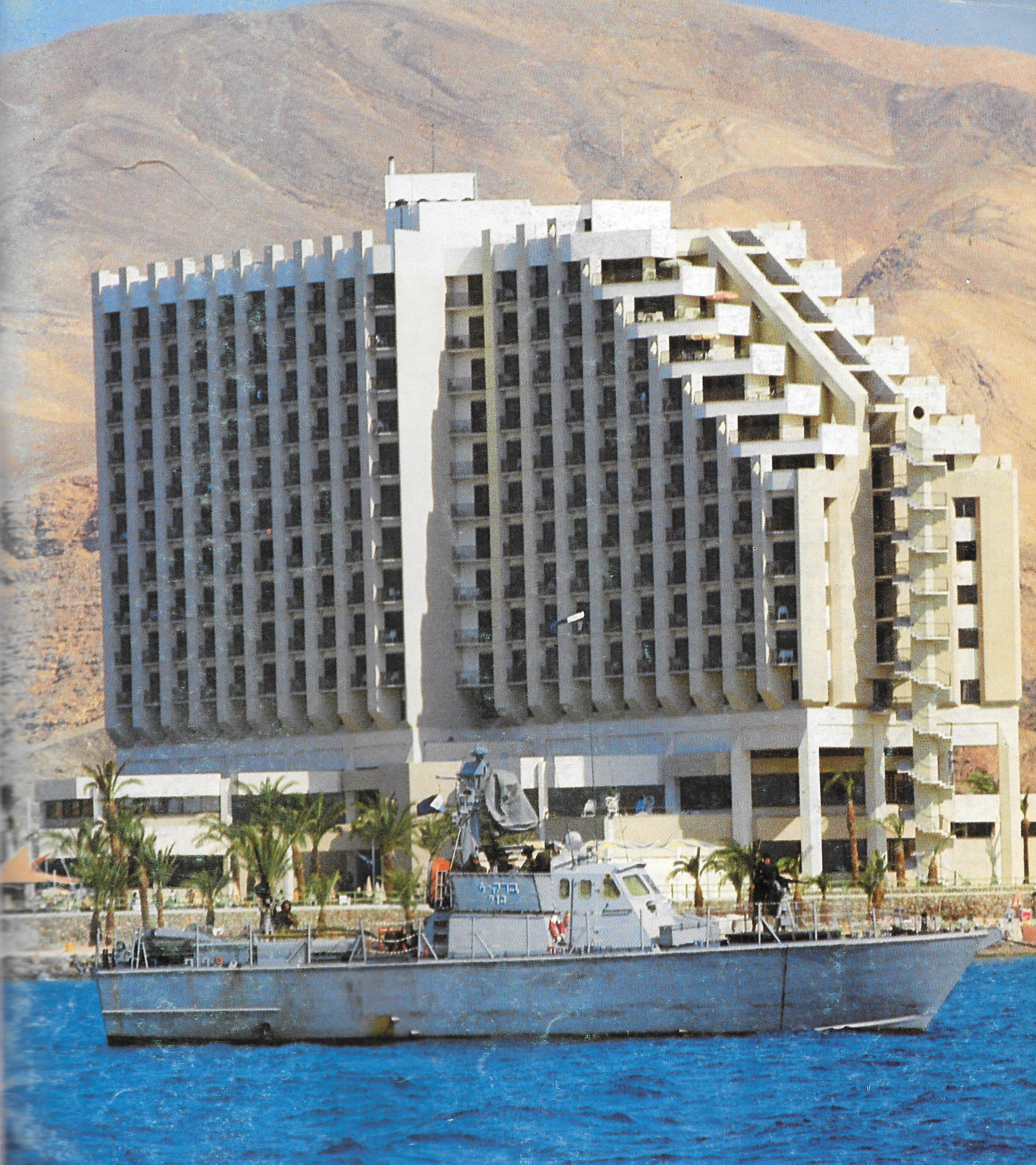
A squadron vessel patrolling near a beach resort in Eilat

In the past, this area was a meeting area between four conflicting countries: Israel, Egypt, Jordan, and Saudi Arabia. However, today all the 4 countries are at peace.

=== History ===
==== Capture of Egyptian Reconnaissance boat ====
On January 5, 1972, in the Gulf of Suez in front of Al-Tur, an Egyptian intelligence boat was captured by Dabura 873 under the command of Lieutenant Yaakov Bogach and the Egyptian intelligence personnel were put on trial.

==== Engagement with De Castro ====
On August 13, 1973, in the North of the Gulf of Suez, Dvor 861, under the command of Shalom Shboy, and Dvor 864, under the command of Eli Gabrieli, discovered the Egyptian ship De Castro crossing the maritime border of Israel in the gulf and attacked it. De Castro was badly hit and managed to return to port but was put out of action.

==== Yom Kippur War ====
===== Battle of Marsa Talamat =====
The Battle of Marsa Talamat was fought between the Israeli Navy and the Egyptian Navy commando forces on October 7, 1973, during the early stages of the Yom Kippur War. It took place in the small Egyptian naval anchorage of Marsa Talamat, in the central sector of the Gulf of Suez. Two Israeli Dabur class patrol boats of the squadron were on a routine patrol mission when the Egyptian Army launched a surprise attack into Israeli-occupied Sinai. When it became evident that a war had started, the Israeli boats were reassigned to destroying Egyptian commando boats in order to interrupt Egyptian commando operations in the Gulf of Suez. The Israeli boats located two Egyptian commando boats which were about to depart Marsa Talamat. The Israeli boats attacked, and continued their attack even when both Daburs accidentally ran aground. The Israeli boats managed to retreat after inflicting considerable damage on the Egyptian commandos. For their actions in the battle, three Israeli crewmen were later awarded the Medal of Distinguished Service. The battle was amongst several significant naval battles which dictated the course of the naval war.

===== Raid on Ras Al Arab =====
On 14 October 1973, in the Gulf of Suez in Ras Al Arab, five patrol boats in two forces under the command of Ami Elon and Israel Petchni attacked mobilized Egyptian fishing boats, that were preparing to transfer raiding forces, and seriously damaged them.

=== Squadron 915 commanders ===
Name	Service	Note	Photo
Herzl Shaf	1970–1971		
Uri Tzur	Summer 1971 – Summer 1972		שמאל
Ami Elon	Summer 1972 – Summer 1973	Yom Kippur War	
Israel Petchnik	Summer 1973 – October 1973	Yom Kippur War	
Abraham ben Zabo	November 1973 – April 1974		
David Bacher	April 1974 – April 1975		
Dubi Geser	April 1975 – December 1975		
Mike Elder	December 1975 – July 1976		
Zvi Yanai	July 1976 – November 1977		
Shmuel Peres	November 1977 – October 1978		
Beam Bears	October 1978 – October 1980		
Yehuda Yaffe	October 1980 – January 1982		
Gershon Neve	January 1982 – April 1982	Evacuation of Sharm el-Sheikh	
Gyora Boxer			
Abrahimi Sarulevich			
Mentin			
Roni Davni	1989–1991		
Ezrael Ram	1991–1992		
Nitzan	1992–1993		
Avidan Bar Sela	1993–1994		
Menachem Levi	1994–1995		
Gyora Dash	July 1995 – August 1997		
Alon	1997–1999		
Kobe Riff	1999–2001		
Issachar Indig	2003–2001		
Amir Gutman	2004–2003		
Zvika Shahar	2006–2004		
Yaniv Shahar	2007–2006		
Mickey Cohen	2010–2007		
Ronen Merkam	2012–2010		
Ira Leaf	2014–2012		
Steven Gordon	2016–2014		l
Yonatan Kudish	2017–2016		
Tal Cohen	2019–2017		
Yoad Toran	2019–2021		
Amir Yaniv	September 2021 – July 2023		
Gal Goren	August 2023 – present		

== Squadron 916 ==
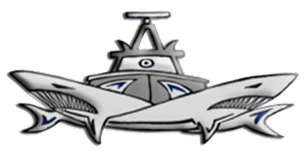
Logo of the 916th patrol squadron

Squadron 916 is a maritime patrol squadron at the Ashdod Naval Base. Its role is to protect the center of the country, but most of its resources are directed to the Gaza Strip. The unit carries out, in addition to maritime security, offensive and deterrent activities aimed at thwarting the activities of militants and disrupting their infrastructure.

Squadron 916 is divided into four patrol cruises: Bezeq Cruise, Sword Cruise, Shark Cruise, and Trigon Cruise. In addition there's also a special Protector USV unit called Knights of Sea. Just as with other squadrons, it also has a Snapir unit concerned with the safety of Ashdod Naval Base.

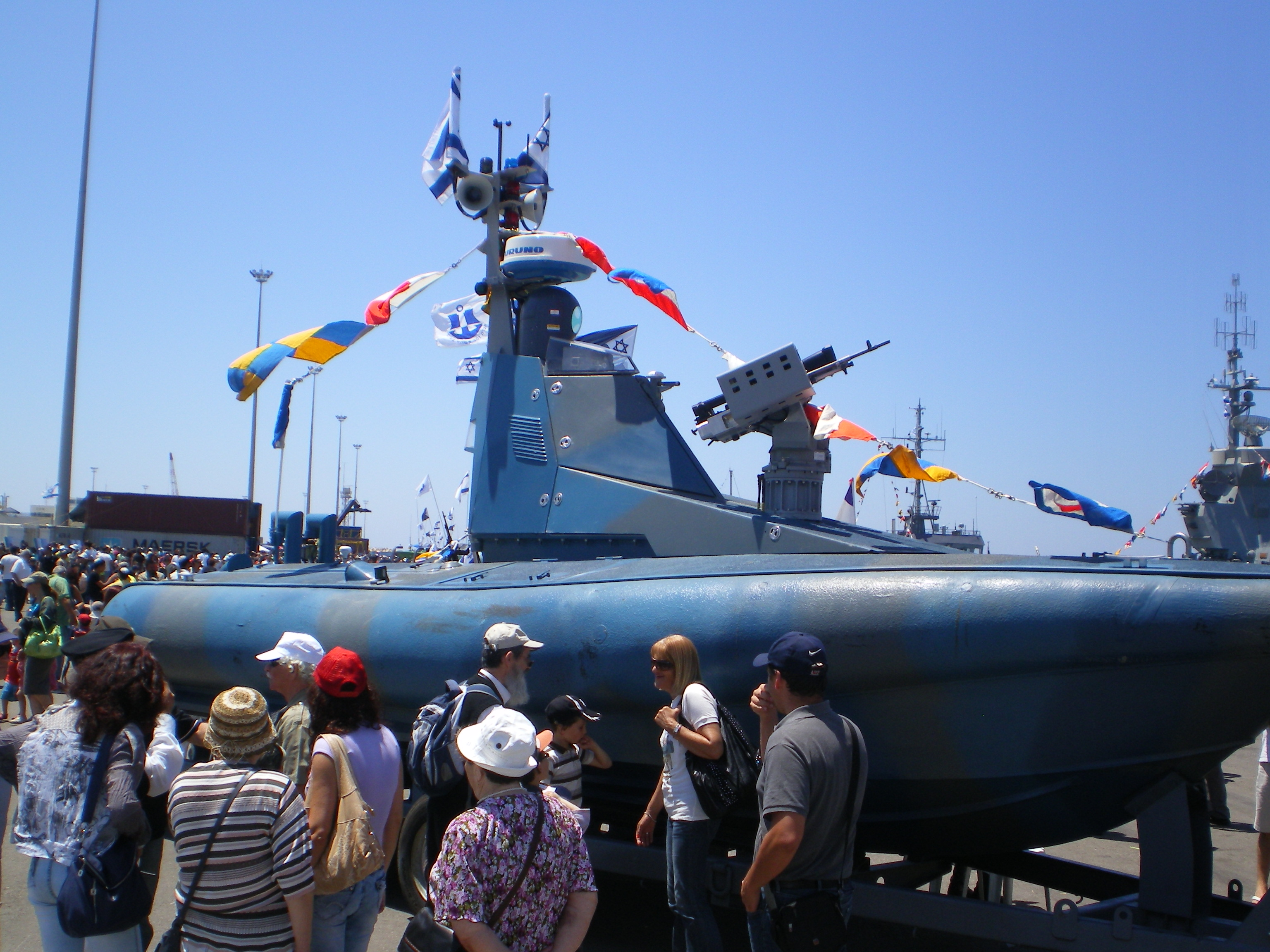
Protector USV on entering service in the squadron

=== History ===
==== Establishment ====
Following the Six Day War and the occupation of the Sinai Peninsula, the maritime border of Israel was extended fivefold. During this period, the Israeli Navy carried out routine security tasks using the torpedo boats to stop infiltration attempts, such as on 1 January 1971, when an infiltration at Achziv beach by Fatah frogmen was thwarted. Another infiltration attempt by Fatah frogmen was thwarted on 14 October 1971, when the enemy squad was captured before the attempt. Another infiltration was thwarted in November 1971, one that came from Lebanon.

Initially, various vessels not suitable for the purpose were used for patrolling, including those of Shayetet 11. On 18 October 1970, the first two Dvor ships arrived in Israel from Swiftships shipyard in Louisiana, United States: Dvor 852, under the command of Major General Aryeh Roder; and Dvor 871, under the command of Major General Uri Levy. They were put into operational use at the Ashdod Naval Base. The unit received the name Patrol 913, and later Squadron 913. The first commander of the unit was Lieutenant Ehud (Odi) Aral. It was the first patrol squadron of the Israeli Navy. The area of control of the Ashdod Naval Base at that time extended for about 370 km, from Netanya to east of the northern entrance to the Suez Canal.

==== Operation Spring of Youth ====
The squadron participated in the 1973 Israeli raid in Lebanon with two patrol boats of the squadron acting as a reserve, along with Shayetet 3 vessels, to pick up the raiding team after completion of the operation as well as to provide cover to the raiding party.

==== Yom Kippur War ====
By October 1973, the unit numbered 4 Dvor boats; and, in addition to the unit's regular forces, the ships' crews were reinforced with reservists. So, it was combat ready and participated in the Yom Kippur War.

===== Battles of Fort Budapest =====
The squadron took part in the Second Battle of Fort Budapest to evacuate the wounded until the siege was lifted by reinforcements on the ground.

===== Rescue of INS Hanit =====
After the Battle of Latakia, a Sa'ar 3 vessel of Shayetet 3, INS Hanit, got struck ashore, so the squadron vessels were dispatched to rescue the vessel and its personnel. Ultimately the mission was a success, and Hanit was towed to Haifa Shipyard for repairs and was returned to service.

===== Operation Lady =====
The squadron participated in Operation Lady. On 16 October 1973, a group of Shayetet 11 vessels led Shayetet 13 to attack Port Said. The strike group was guarded and reinforced by the squadron vessels. The operation was carried out successfully and multiple Egyptian vessels were damaged or destroyed.

==== Renaming ====
With the increase in the number of Bees, squadron 913 was renamed as squadron 916 in October 1975. At its establishment, the fleet numbered 7 patrol boats.

==== Egypt-Israel peace agreement ====
Following the Egypt-Israel peace treaty, the IDF withdrew from the Sinai Peninsula, moving the southern point of the unit's patrol sector from Suez to Rafah, and shifting its main purpose from patrolling against the Egyptians to guarding against militant infiltrations (such as Coastal Road massacre).

==== 1982 Lebanon War ====
The flotilla participated in the 1982 Lebanon War. On 6 June 1982, Israeli forces under the direction of Defense Minister Ariel Sharon launched a three-pronged invasion of southern Lebanon in "Operation Peace for Galilee". The squadron vessels from Ashdod Naval Base traversed towards the Lebanese coast north of Sidon. Israel's publicly stated objective was to push PLO forces back 40 kilometers (25 mi) to the north. An Israeli amphibious operation was conducted north of Sidon. Two groups of commandos from the Shayetet 13 naval commando unit then came ashore to probe enemy defenses and secure the landing site. They were provided cover by Squadron 916, as Squadron 914 was tasked to deal with any probable infiltration that could happen as a result of the conflict.

==== Patrols with 914 Squadron ====
During the 1980s, the squadron was involved in patrolling operations in the Northern Arena as the southern sector was pretty secure after the Egypt-Israel peace treaty, including thwarting an infiltration attempt on April 25, 1988. During these operations squadron member Ofer Salomon was Killed in Action on January 5, 1984.

==== First Intifada ====
During the First Intifada, the squadron extensively patrolled the waters off the coast of the Gaza Strip, and on 30 May 1990, 2 patrol boats of the squadron got stuck while chasing militants' fast boats that were trying to penetrate to the shores of Israel. One of the enemy boats landed on a Gaza Strip beach, where 4 of its men were killed and 7 were captured.

==== Oslo accords ====
As the Oslo Accords resulted in a separate and autonomous administration of the Gaza Strip, the patrol area was changed to 12 miles away from the Gazan coast, as well as respecting the Egyptian maritime border.

==== Second Intifada ====
During the Second intifada, Israel blockaded the Palestinian territories, including the Gaza Strip, several times, with the squadron primarily carrying out the naval blockade of the Gaza Strip.

==== Operation Summer Rains ====
On 26 June 2006, during the 2006 Gaza–Israel conflict, the Israeli Navy imposed a naval closure of the Gaza Strip, to prevent captured IDF soldier Gilad Shalit being smuggled out by sea. The squadron increased inspections of naval vessels along the Gaza coastline, sending instructions to captains. Palestinian fast boats were banned from operating in the area, and only small Palestinian fishing boats were allowed on the sea.

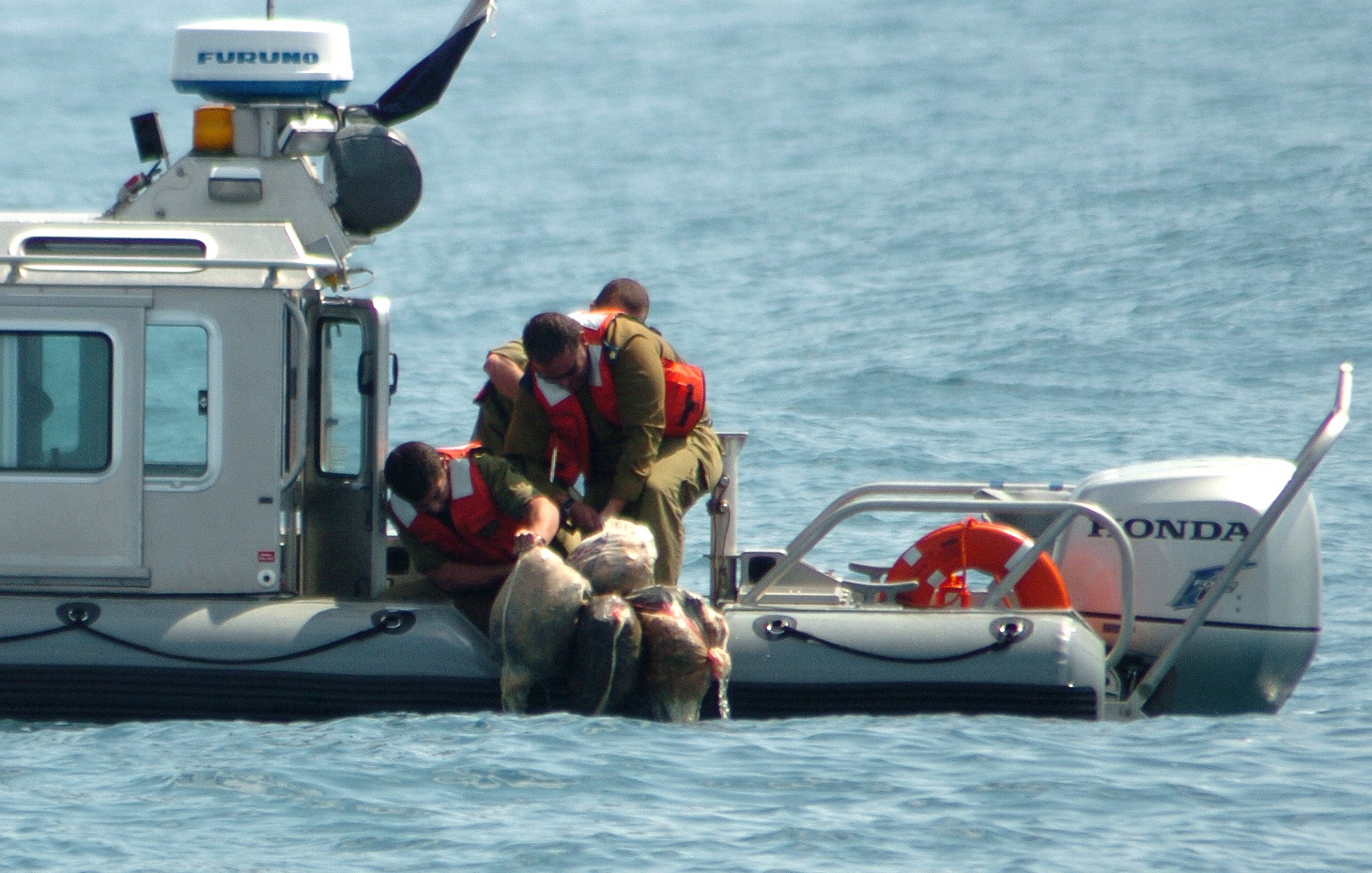
Snapir unit thwarting a smuggling attempt into Gaza

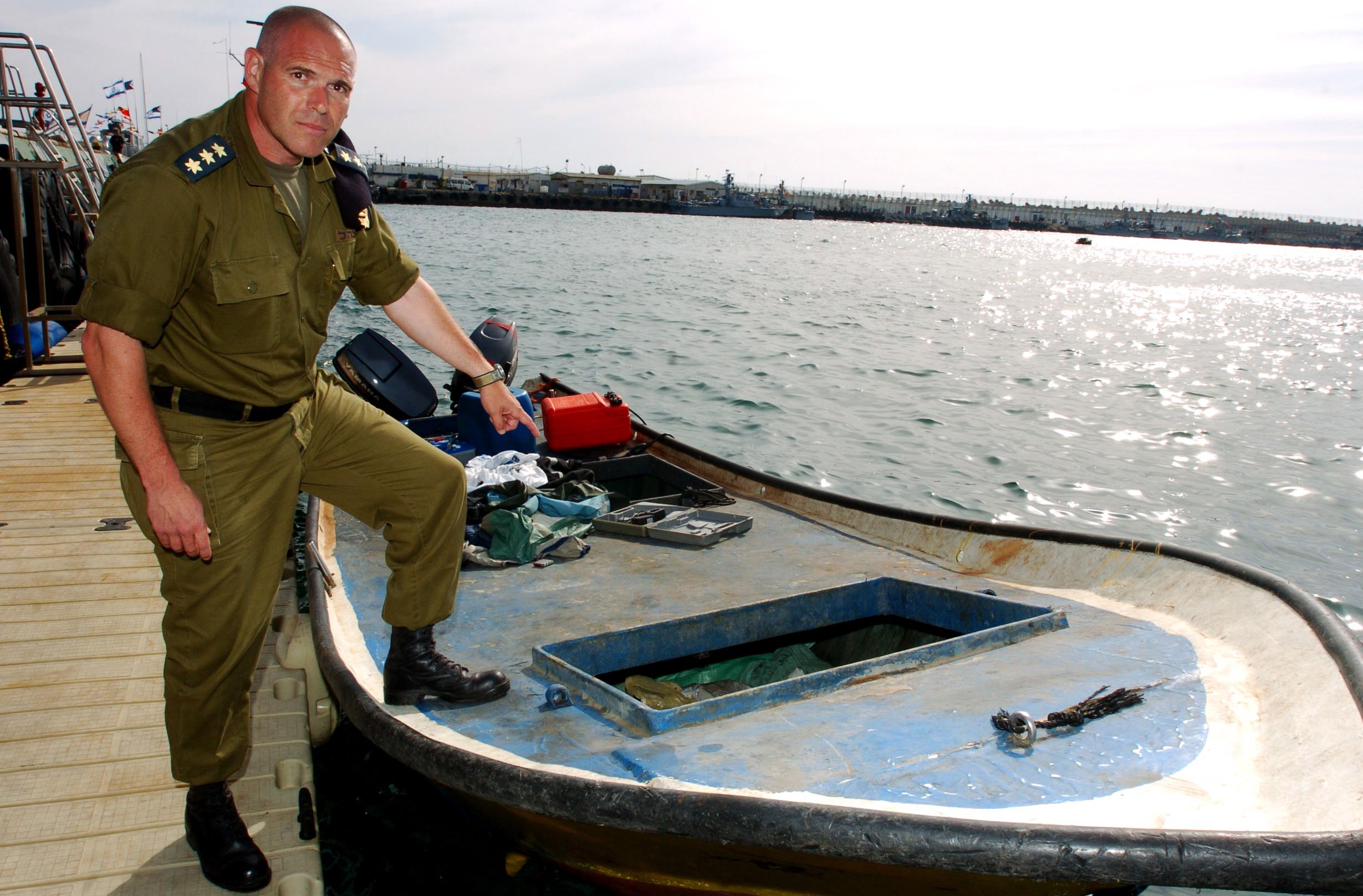
A smuggling boat captured near Gaza being inspected by the Ashdod Naval Base commander

==== Operation Hot Winter ====
The squadron participated in Operation Hot Winter, an IDF offensive in the Gaza strip, by reinforcing the naval blockade of Gaza Strip.

==== Operation Cast Lead ====
During the Gaza War (2008–2009), the Israeli Navy attacked Hamas's rocket launchers and outposts, command and control centers, a Hamas patrol boat, and the office of Hamas Prime Minister Ismail Haniyeh, using the Typhoon Weapon System and surface to surface missiles. The navy coordinated with other Israeli forces and used powerful shipboard sensors to acquire and shell targets on land. Records of the attacks, published by the navy, indicate that for the first time vessels were equipped with Spike ER electro-optically guided anti-armor missiles. Videos of an attack showed precision hits from a Typhoon stabilizing gun, despite a rolling sea. Versions of the Spike were also used by ground units and possibly by helicopters or unmanned aerial vehicles. Shayetet 13 naval commandos were also deployed to attack targets on land, and reportedly attacked an Iranian ship loaded with arms for Hamas, which was docking in Sudan. On 28 December 2008, naval vessels shelled the Port of Gaza.

On 29 December 2008, the Free Gaza Movement relief boat Dignity, carrying volunteer doctors with 3.5 tons of medical supplies, human rights activists (Among them Caoimhe Butterly and former US Representative Cynthia McKinney), and a CNN reporter, was involved in an incident with Israeli patrol boats of the squadron. The captain of the Free Gaza vessel said that their vessel had been rammed intentionally and that there had been no warning before it had been rammed. An Israeli spokesman disputed this, and said the collision was caused by the Dignity attempting to outmaneuver the patrol boats after disobeying Israeli orders to turn back.

On 4 January 2009, the Israeli Navy extended its blockade of the Gaza Strip to 20 nautical miles to sea.

Throughout the war, the Israeli Navy employed Super Dvora Mk III class patrol boats of the squadron.

==== Operation Pillar of Cloud ====
During the 2014 Gaza War, in the 2014 Zikim attack, cannon fire from a Dvora patrol boat of the squadron and support from the Israeli Air Force were used to eliminate the infiltrators. According to IDF assessments, the enemy commando unit was dispatched by "a senior terrorist operative", Ahmed Andur, active in northern Gaza. Taysir Mubasher, the former commander of Hamas's naval forces, was also claimed by the IDF to have been involved in the attack and was allegedly killed. Captain Uri Nissim received the Major General's Award and the Squadron received a unit citation for its role in stopping the infiltration.

==== Gaza War ====
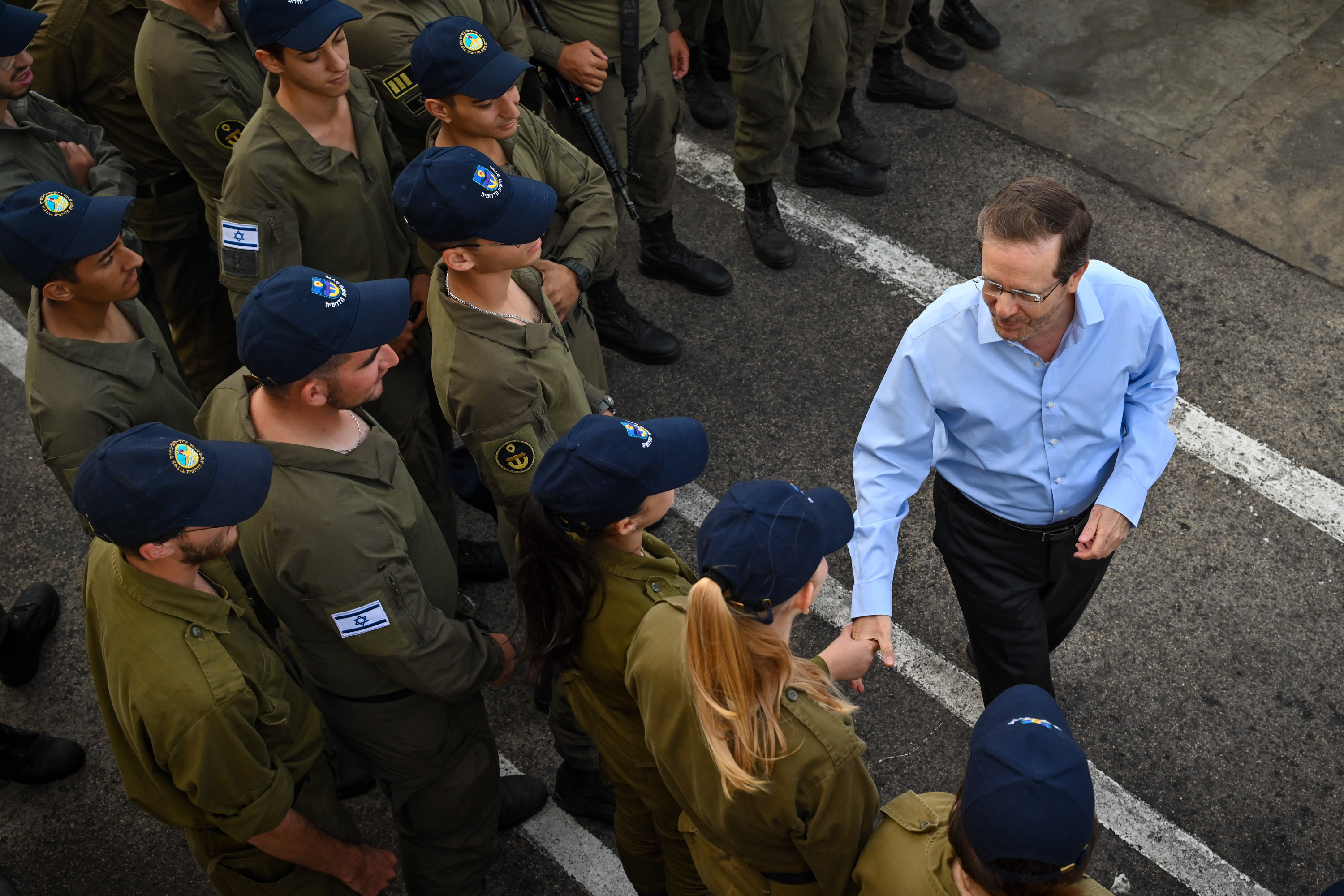
Israeli President Isaac Herzog visits the squadron headquarters during the Gaza war

During the Gaza war the squadron participated in various operations. During the Zikim attack, amongst the October 7 attacks, amid the 6:30 rocket barrage, which also targeted Israeli naval facilities, four boats with an estimated 35 fighters of Hamas's Nukhba unit were observed crossing into Israeli waters from the Gaza fishing zone. Colonel Eitan Paz, commander of the Ashdod naval base, having been forewarned of the invasion by Gaza Division commander Avi Rosenfeld earlier in the morning, immediately ordered the forces under his command to defend the Israeli maritime border and prevent raids on the coast.

Israeli sources stated that three of the boats were destroyed by patrol boats of the Israeli Navy's 916th Patrol Squadron from Ashdod naval base before they reached the shore, and sailors of the Snapir unit, the Israeli Navy's protection and harbor security unit, on Defender-class boats, subsequently moved in and killed, with gunfire and depth charges, the survivors, as well as Hamas divers they discovered. However, the remaining boat soon made it to Zikim beach. The IDF estimated that 11 Hamas militants managed to land on the beach. Two or three were killed by naval gunfire shortly after landing, but the rest began killing civilians on the beach. In the aftermath of the October 7 attacks, squadron fighters killed dozens of militants at sea and on land, hit targets near the shores of the Gaza Strip, and assisted ground forces with fire and observation. In addition, sailors assisted with raids from the sea into the Gaza Strip.

=== Squadron 916 commanders ===
Name	Service	Note	Image
Ehud Aral	September 1970 – November 1971		סגן אהוד אראל 1969
Danny Melamed	November 1971 – November 1972		
Abraham Fin	1972–1973	Operation Spring of Youth	
Yochanan Peltz	1973–1975	Yom Kippur War	שמאל
Israel Hecht	1975		
Ehud Savion	December 1975 – May 1977		
Ami Segev	May 1977 – November 1978		
David Atzmon	November 1978 – June 1979		
Amiram Raphael	June 1979 – September 1981		
Haim Lahav	September 1981 – September 1983		
Haim Grover	September 1983 – August 1985		
Shahar Aharon	August 1985 – October 1987		
Amram Hami	October 1987 – August 1989		
Levi Shaft	August 1989 – August 1991		
Noam Feig	August 1991 – April 1993		
Dror Maor	April 1993 – December 1994		
Ofer David	December 1994 – September 1996		
Aryeh Nagler	September 1996 – January 1999		
Ben Zion Dabul	January 1999 – October 2000		
Yair Zilberman	October 2000 - July 2002		
David Sa'ar Selma	July 2002 – July 2004	Later chief of the Israeli Navy	
Ido Ben-Moshe	July 2004 – July 2006		
Saar Carmeli	July 2006 – August 2008		
Eyal Harel	August 2008 – July 2010	Operation Cast Lead	
Guy Goldfarb	July 2010 – July 2012		
Eli Sohulitsky	July 2012 – August 2014	Operation Solid Cliff	שמאל
Liav Zilberman	August 2014 – August 2016		
Boris Schuster	August 2016 – July 2018		
Guy Barak	July 2018 – January 2020		
Ran Steigman	January 2020 – June 2021		
Roy Gerdosh	June 2021 - July 2023		
Matan Hazan	July 2023 – present	Gaza war	

== Sources ==
- Gadi Schechter (2014). ""ההיסטוריה של הדבורה". Museum of Immigration and the Navy (Israel).
- Pini Sharig (2020). "לא בגאווה אלא בלי חרטה". "אחרי אגדות פלברה זה באמת קרה". Beit Haval. p. 157.
- Yitzchak Shamir (2020). "פיצוץ בדבור 862". "אגדות אחי פלברה שבאמת קרו". Beit Haval. p. 374.
- Michael Schnitkin (2020). ""'הלילה הזה הוא הלילה'" (טביעת סירת מחבלים)". "אחרי אגדות פלברה זה באמת קרה". Beit Haval. p. 385.
- Boris Wesler (2020). """חיסול צמד מחבלים במים""- עם דבורה 813 ב-10 ביולי 1994". "אגדות אחי פלברה שבאמת קרו". Beit Haval. p. 393.
- Meir Shapir and Aryeh Doblin, לכידת מחבלים ואנשי מודיעין - התקלות בליל עלטה, "Marine Systems" March 1971, p. 45.
- P. courage, לילה בגבול הצפון, 'Marine Systems' 109, July 1972, p. 20.
- Uri Porat, לכידת ספינת מחבלים, 'Marine Systems' 104, July 1971, p. 6.
- Capt. Ofir, שיר לסיירת הימית, 'Between Waves' October 1975, p. 29.
- Giorgio Reka, ה"דבורים" אינם מלקקים דבש, 'Between Waves' March 1983.
- "שרק יהיה הים שקט" - כתבתו של עמנואל רוזן about the voyages, published on July 2, 1984, in Maariv, on the National Library website.
- Aryeh Kiesel and Sharon Harpaz,דבור בראש, 'Between Waves' 163 November 1984 p. 2.
- Raanan Czerbinski, את הבט"ש הזה לעולם לא ישכחו, 'Between Waves' July 1986.
- Raanan Charbinski and Ruthie Rodner,חדשות בין גלים דבור וסירת מחבלים, פרס מגן לתחנת ראש הנקרה, Between Waves 174 June 1988 p. 18.
- סוכל ניסיון פיגוע צפונית לראש הנקרה, "Bin Galim" 181 August 1990, p. 27
- Kizel Tyle, אורות גבוהים - מערכת חדשה לראיית לילה, 'Between Waves' 182 January 1991 p. 25.
- Yuval Karni, זמזום קטלני - המפקדים הצעירים של הדבורים, "Bin Galim" celebratory jubilee issue October 1998, p. 22.
- Yuval Karni, מה עושה מפקד דבור במטבח, 'Between Waves', April 2002.
- Mordechai Alon, שלדג טבילת האש הראשונה, "Between Waves" October 7, 2004, p. 24
- Ido Laur, שלדג חדש בחיל הים, "Between Waves", May 8, 2005 p. 42.
- Rocky Tilapia, ראשית הדבורים - תכנון תוצרת הארץ, "Between Waves", September 9, 2005 72
- Oded Shlomot, המילואימניקים נפרדים מהים, "Between Waves", September 9, 2005 p. 58.
- Ido Laur, הגבול הכי חם של ישראל, "Between Waves", 10, July 2006, p. 44.
- Eric Ofir, פלגה 914 - ימי קרבות, "Between Waves", October 11, 2006, p. 14.
- Aryeh Tal, קולאז' פלגת דבורים 914 וגם בגבול הארוך ביותר בישראל, "Between Waves", 12, October 2007, pp. 51 and 52.
- Aryeh Tal, לוחמי פלגה 914, "Between Waves", September 2008, p. 8.
- Doron Soslik, ספינות סיור מתקדמות, "Between Waves", April 2010, p. 32.
- Ado Neuhaus, יומן מסע - מלח ים והרבה פאסון קורס דבורנים, "Between Waves", October 2010, p. 58.
- Raviv Hadar, מסרים מהמס"רים, 'Between Waves' May 2014, p. 40.
- Annie Elroy' מתרגלים על רטוב - תרגיל פלגה שנתי, 'Between Waves', October 2014, p. 60.
- Tevel Demari, לוחם ימי במגמת עליה וגם ראיון עם מפקדי סיירות שסיימו תפקידם, "Between Waves", September 2015, pp. 46 and 51.
- Sapir Mosholam and Tebal Demari, לוחמי הצפון גם עליונות ימית וגם תמונה מספרת, 'Between Waves', May 2016, pp. 36, 48 and 61.
- Tevel Demari, Moshe Knafi and Sapir Meshulam, הדבור האחרון בים התיכון,"Bin Galim", October 2016, p. 47.
- Demari Earth, חוד החנית של 914 וגם להיות מילואימניק בפלגה 914 וגם מפל"ג 914 רונן מרקם, "Between Waves", May 2017, pp. 12, 41 and 67.
- Amnon Gonen and others, הדבורים של שייטת הצוללות, October 2021.
- Amir Mushak (2020). "סיור על השונית". אגדות אחי פלברה שבאמת קרו. Beit Haval. p. 40.
- Yosef Omesi (2020). "פיקוד על כוורת מילואים". "אגדות אחי פלברה שבאמת קרו". Beit Haval. p. 128.
- Michael Koren (2020). "ספורט זה לא בריא". אגדות אחי פלברה שבאמת קרו. Beit Haval. p. 288.
- Kochavi Azran, "היסטוריה של צי 915 - צי "אבירי המפרץ", Millennium Ayalon, 2022.
- אתר אבירי המפרץ, website of 915 Patrol Squadron
- Batia Shem-El, יחידות בחיל - היתושים בסיירת הימית של אילת אינם עוקצים, 'Between Waves' July 1975 p. 18.
- Giorgio Rekha, שומרים על השקט בבריכה, 'Between Waves' 164 February 1985, p. 21.
- Raanan Cherbinski, אל תסמוך על המזל, 'Between Waves' 170-171 June 1987, p. 8.
- Father Obel, תקרית היכטה של חוסיין ודבור שביצע ניסוי קנים, "Between Waves" 181 August 1990, p. 26.
- Ilanit Fener, נחשול זריז ומסוכן , 'Shuval' information sheet, Navy Association (Israel), August 1998 p. 4.
- Itamar Guy, מפגש נוסטלגיה לוחמי פלגה 915 6 בדצמבר 2008, "Between Waves", May 2009, p. 48.
- Sapir שירות החופשה של "נששולים". "Between waves", October 2016, p. 12
- Meir Ben Ezra and Batia Van Zeiden, הלוחמים שחוצים את ים סוף כל השנה, IDF website, March 31, 2021.
- Uri Milstein, יעקב בוגץ' מספר על הדבורים בזירת ים סוף
- Amit Erez, רב-סרן בדימוס נמרוד ארז, סגן מפקד דבור 864 בזירת ים סוף מלחמת יום הכיפורים, Dor Ki Ipur 73, Brigade 679 association.
- Moshe Imber, Chapters of history from: "'916 Fleet Heritage Display'", graphic design and production - Gad Ariel, 2005.
- Dror Gat, Fleet 916, "Between the Waves", Bytown Navy Association (Israel), May issue, 2008, p. 18
- Eli Melchi et al., "'האתגר האמיתי של מפקדי הספינות", "אגדות אחי פלברה שבאמת קרו", published by Beit Haval, 2020, p. 318
- Daniel Reva, "שוטי שוטי שיפטי", Deputy Yotam Kon commander of Deborah, Caesarea News, April 9, 2021. p. 34
- Avi Oval, "לא זורקים דגים: בתאש נגד האינתיפאדה", בין גלים 179 (pp. 16–18), November 1989
- Lt. Col. S., commander of the Bee unit in Ashdod, "הברחת סמים", בין גלים 180 (p. 21), April 1990
- Shani Fais, "שני המנועים לאחור: במקדש דבורי אשדוד", בין גלים 182 (pp. 18–20), January 1991
- Ido Laor, "זירת אשדוד: הגבול החם של ישראל", בין גלים 10 (pp. 44–48), July 2006
- Navy barges, "חדשות חיל הים: #06 רגע לפני רגע האמת", בין גלים אוקטובר 2014 (p. 9)
- Brit Almog, "סיכול ציר ההברחה הימית", בין גלים ספטמבר 2015 (pp. 20–24)
- Tevel Demari, "חדשות זרוע הים: #17 מתאמן בים באוויר וביבשה", בין גלים אוקטובר 2016, p. 19
- Tevel Demari, "אמצעי נגד ממוקדים: האתגר הימי שלא ידעת עליו", בין גלים מאי 2017 (pp. 29–32)
- פלגות הבט"ש on Israeli Navy website
- נפרדים ממפל״ג 916, Israeli Navy website July 2021
- פעילות מול רצועת עזה, March 2023.
- Shay Levi, ספינה חדשה נכנסה לשירות מבצעי בעזה, הלוחמים חיסלו עשרות מחבלים, Makuo website, July 24, 2024.
- "אבירי המפרץ" 915 Squadron veterans website.
- Meir Shapir and Aryeh Doblin, הסיירת במפרץ אילת, "Marine Systems" March 1971, p. 42.
- Meir Shapir and Aryeh Doblin, לכידת מחבלים ואנשי מודיעין - התקלות בליל עלטה, "Marine Systems" March 1971, p. 45.
- P. courage, לילה בגבול הצפון, 'Marine Systems' 109, July 1972, p. 20.
- Uri Porat, לכידת ספינת מחבלים, 'Marine Systems' 104, July 1971, p. 6.
- Capt. Ofir, שיר לסיירת הימית, 'Between Waves' October 1975, p. 29.
- Giorgio Reka, ה"דבורים" אינם מלקקים דבש, 'Between Waves' March 1983.
- "שרק יהיה הים שקט" - כתבתו של עמנואל רוזן About the voyages, published on July 2, 1984, in Maariv, on the website of the National Library.
- Aryeh Kiesel and Sharon Harpaz, דבור בראש, 'Between Waves' 163 Nov 1984 p. 2.
- Jacob Bogach שארם שלי, זכרונות משירות בפלגה 915 בתחילת שנות ה-70.
- Raanan Czerbinski, את הבט"ש הזה לעולם לא ישכחו, 'Between Waves' July 1986.
- Raanan Charbinski and Ruthie Rodner, חדשות בין גלים דבור וסירת מחבלים, פרס מגן לתחנת ראש הנקרה, Bin Galim 174 June 1988 p. 18.
- סוכל ניסיון פיגוע צפונית לראש הנקרה, (Note: ב-24 ביוני 1990, דבורה הופעלה מול מטרה מערבית לרשידיה, שני מחבלים ירו אר פיג'י ונהרגו.) "Between Waves" 181 August 1990, p. 27
- אורות גבוהים - מערכת חדשה לראיית לילה, 'Between Waves' 182 January 1991 p. 25.
- Yuval Karni, זמזום קטלני - המפקדים הצעירים של הדבורים, "Bin Galim" celebratory jubilee issue October 1998, p. 22.
- Yuval Karni, מה עושה מפקד דבור במטבח, 'Between Waves', April 2002.
- Mordechai Alon, שלדג טבילת האש הראשונה, "Between Waves" October 7, 2004, p. 24
- Ido Laur, שלדג חדש בחיל הים, "Between Waves", May 8, 2005 p. 42.
- Rocky tilapia, ראשית הדבורים - תכנון תוצרת הארץ, "Between Waves", September 9, 2005 72
- Oded Shlomot, המילואימניקים נפרדים מהים, "Between Waves", September 9, 2005 p. 58.
- Ido Laur, הגבול הכי חם של ישראל, "Between Waves", 10, July 2006, p. 44.
- Eric Ofir, פלגה 914 - ימי קרבות, "Between Waves", October 11, 2006, p. 14.
- Aryeh Tal, קולאז' פלגת דבורים 914 וגם בגבול הארוך ביותר בישראל, "Between Waves", 12, October 2007, pp. 51 and 52.
- Aryeh Tal, לוחמי פלגה 914, "Between Waves", September 2008, p. 8.
- Doron Soslik, ספינות סיור מתקדמות, "Between Waves", April 2010, p. 32.
- Ado Neuhaus, יומן מסע - מלח ים והרבה פאסון קורס דבורנים, "Between Waves", October 2010, p. 58.
- Raviv Hadar, מסרים מהמס"רים, 'Between Waves' May 2014, p. 40.
- Annie Elroy' מתרגלים על רטוב - תרגיל פלגה שנתי, 'Between Waves', October 2014, p. 60.
- Tevel Demari, לוחם ימי במגמת עליה וגם ראיון עם מפקדי סיירות שסיימו תפקידם, "Between Waves", September 2015, pp. 46 and 51.
- Sapir Mosholam and Tebal Demari, לוחמי הצפון גם עליונות ימית וגם תמונה מספרת, 'Between Waves', May 2016, pp. 36, 48 and 61.
- Tevel Demari, Moshe Knafi and Sapir Meshulam, הדבור האחרון בים התיכון "Between Waves", October 2016, p. 47.
- Demari Earth, חוד החנית של 914וגם להיות מילואימניק בפלגה 914 וגם מפל"ג 914 רונן מרקם, "Between Waves", May 2017, pp. 12, 41 and 67.
- David Bacher, פלגת דבורים בסערה במפרץ סואץ, The website of the Maritime Heritage Conservancy (Israel), January 16, 2018.
- Nimrod Erez, תקיפת מעגן ראס ע'ריב במלחמת יום הכיפורים On the site of the Maritime Heritage Conservation (Israel).
- Ami Elon, דבורים וראס סודר במלחמת יום הכיפורים On the site of the Maritime Heritage Conservation (Israel).
- Meir Shapir and Aryeh Samsonov, "'ספינות מלחמה קטנות, דיוקן הטורפדו, הקרב בפורט סעיד,'" Sea Systems, March 1969, pp. 15–45.
- Slomo Aral, "'הסירה הקטנה בראשיתה'" "Naval Systems" 92–93, March 1969, p. 17.
- Amos Ettinger, "'אהבה ושמה הוא טורפדו,'" Sea Systems" 93–92, March 1969, p. 42.
- Shabtai Levi, "'טורפדו היום'" "Naval Systems" 92–93, March 1969, p. 45.
- Meir Shafir and Aryeh Doblin, "'תחילה בשארם א-שייח" Sea Systems, March 1971, p. 43.
- Brian Cooper, הספינות הקטנות, מלחמת הטורפדות', Setting Press 1972.
- Brian Cooper, 'הספינות הקטנות, מלחמת הטורפדות, translated from English by Azriel Tal, Systems Publishing 1972.
- Mike Elder, 'שיתא 13, Maariv Library, Tel Aviv. 1993
- Yitzhak Shoshan, "הקרב האחרון של המשחתת אילת", Maariv Library, Tel Aviv, 1993
- Mike Elder, שייטת 11, Had Artzi Publishing House, Jerusalem. 1996
- Slomo Aral Alof (res.), 'לפני הים, Ministry of Defense - Publishing House, Tel Aviv, 1998
- Avraham Rabinowitz, "' ספינות שרבורג'", Efi Meltzer Military Research, Journalism and Publishing, Reut, 2001
- Moshe Imber and Gad Ariel, "תצוגת מורשת צי 914", Haifa base, 2004
- Moshe Imber and Gad Ariel, "תצוגת מורשת צי 916", Ashdod Base, 2005
- Zvi Keinan, 'מבט אחורה סיפור אישי, pp. 171–173, Gavol Publishing, 2005
- Benyamin Talm Alof (res.), תלם בים, writing: Amots Shurk, Bini Talm (private publisher), 2009
- Moshe Imber (research, writing and editing), Gad Ariel (graphic editing and production), "'חדר של מערכת הסיור והבקרה ב,'" Navy Department, 2009
- Gadi Schechter, "תולדות הדבורה, תולדות ספינות ה-BTS בחיל הים הישראלי."
- Gadi Schechter, "'ספינות טורפדו בשירות חיל הים,'" Bin Galim Magazine Navy Association (Israel), May 2016
- David Maguri Cohen, "'צעד אחד קדימה'", Efi Meltzer - Military Research Journalism and Publishing, Reut, pp. 55–94
- 1972, Christopher Dawson, A Quest for Speed at Sea, Hutchinson&Co. (Publishers) Ltd, London
- Moshe Gorman and Aryeh Ben-Eli, השייטת הקטנה, "Navy" booklet 7 January 1949, p. 17.
- Michael Holler, כרישי חיל הים מגיחים, Marine Systems July 1954, pp. 34–37.
- Michael Holler הטרפדות תוקפות, Naval Systems, March 28, 1956, p. 3.
- Itamar Kotai, בספינת משמר לים הפתוח, "Marine Systems" 28, March 1956, p. 52.
- A. tenenbaum, צרעות חיל הים על המשמר, "Marine Systems" December 1956, p. 51.
- Samson Eden, טרפדות בפעולות לילה, "Marine Systems" MB, July 1959, p. 36.
- Ezra Lahad, טרפדות יורדות לאילת, "Marine Systems" MG, October 1959, p. 85.
- Zev Schiff, המהירים שבחיל - הטרפדות, "Navy Systems", September 1961, p. 6.
- David Sagi, ניסיתי להשתחרר מפלגת הטרפדות, 'Marine Systems' 69, November 1964, p. 17.
- Alex Drury, המסע לרודוס, 'Marine Systems' 70, January 1965, p. 6.
- P. ninth, ישראלים בארמון קנוסוס, 'Marine Systems' 74–75, January 1966, p. 43.
- Oded Egor, טווח לספינות הטילים 1000 יארד, Sea Systems Booklet No. 85-86 July 1967, pp. 40 – 41
- Uri Porat, סיור למוקדי הסערה טרפדות בים האדום, "Marine Systems" Booklet No. 85-86 July 1967, pp. 22–23.
- Meir Shapir, Sholomo Aral and Benyamin Telam, ציוני דרך הטרפדות 1968-1948 , "Marine Systems" 1968
- Amos Ettinger, אהבה ושמה טרפדת "Marine Systems" 93-92 March 1969, p. 42.
- Shabtai Levi, הטרפדות כיום "Marine Systems" 93-92 March 1969, p. 45.
- שייטת 5 - השייטת הקטנה, Navy Headquarters (Israel) 1986.
- Moshe Avgi, צל"ש ליעקב ניצן ויהודה סמברג, May 17, 2012.
- Rafi Raz, הפגנת נוכחות מופגזת מאד במפרץ סואץ, website of the Maritime Heritage Conservancy (Israel), 2014.
- Uzi Sela, השירות שלי בטרפדות 1956-1958, 2015.
- Lt. Col. Yigal Oren, קצין התיקונים של פלגות הטרפדות, 2015
- Col. (Res.) Shmuel Peres, הצלת צוות המשחתת אילת, June 2014
- Rami Rafaeli, השרות בפלגת הטרפדות 914,
- Shlomo Arel, הטרפדות בים האדום, May 2016.
- Gadi Schechter, אנשי הברזל על ספינות העץ, 'Between Waves' May 2016, p. 58.
- Yishai Kalinovski, אנשי הברזל בספינות העץ The Maritime Heritage Conservancy website March 2017.
- Aya Merbach and Yaakov Tsuraon, מספרים באהבה על הטרפדות "Carmel View" November 13, 2017.
- טרפדות חיל הים במלחמת ששת הימים Video produced by 'Carmel View' Nov 15, 2017.
- Kochavi Azran, Interviews of Shayetet 5 personnel April - June 2022
  - דוד מגורי כהן
  - מנחם ים שחור,
  - רמי רפאלי,
  - אלי לוי,
  - ויוסף הררי "צוץ"'
  - אריה רונה.
  - אלי רהב סגן מפקד הפלגה,
  - רפי רז מפקד טרפדת ט-203,
  - עמי שר אל כמפקד טרפדת ט-208.
