= YALTAM =

- יחידה למשימות תת-מימיות
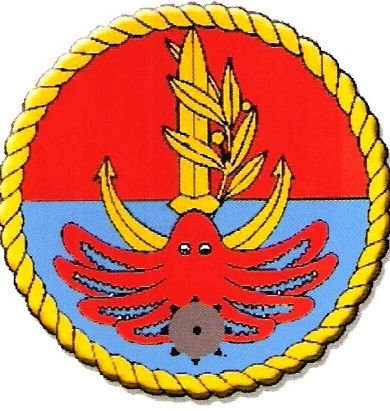
- Unit logo
- Active: 1963 – present (modern form since 1981)
- Country: Israel
- Branch: Israeli Navy
- Type: Special Purpose Unit
- Role: Search & Rescue, Underwater detection, bomb disposal, sabotage, amphibious assaults,
- Size: ~100
- Part of: Israeli Navy
- Garrison/HQ: Haifa naval base
- Nickname: Unit 707

Commanders
- Notable commanders: See #Commanders

Insignia
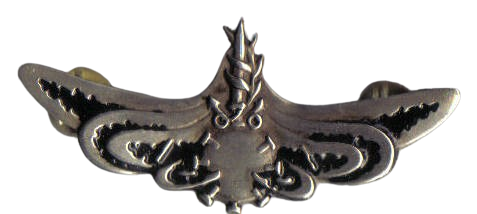
- YILTAM "Octopus Wings"

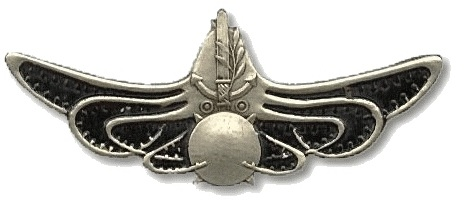
- Unit 707 "Octopus Wings"

Yaltam (Hebrew: ילת"ם) is the Israeli Navy Underwater Missions Unit (Hebrew: יחידה למשימות תת-מימיות Yechida le'Mishimot Tat-Mayimiyot), specializing in diver operations. The unit was initially established as Unit 707 in 1963 but in its present form it was established in 1981. It is headquartered at the Haifa naval base.

== Bases ==
In 1965, the area that was formerly used by Torpedo Squadron in Haifa naval base was transferred to Unit 707. The unit's headquarters, the workshop, the dining hall and the living quarters were all situated there. Since the culvert there was suitable only for Shayetet 11 vessels, the unit's men themselves built a pier to launch their vessels.

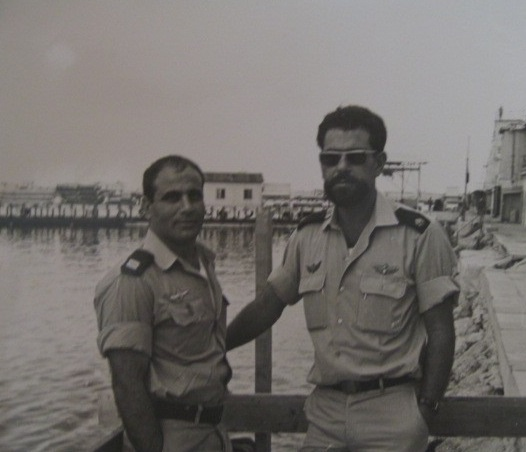
Unit commander Shaul Sela at the Unit headquarters

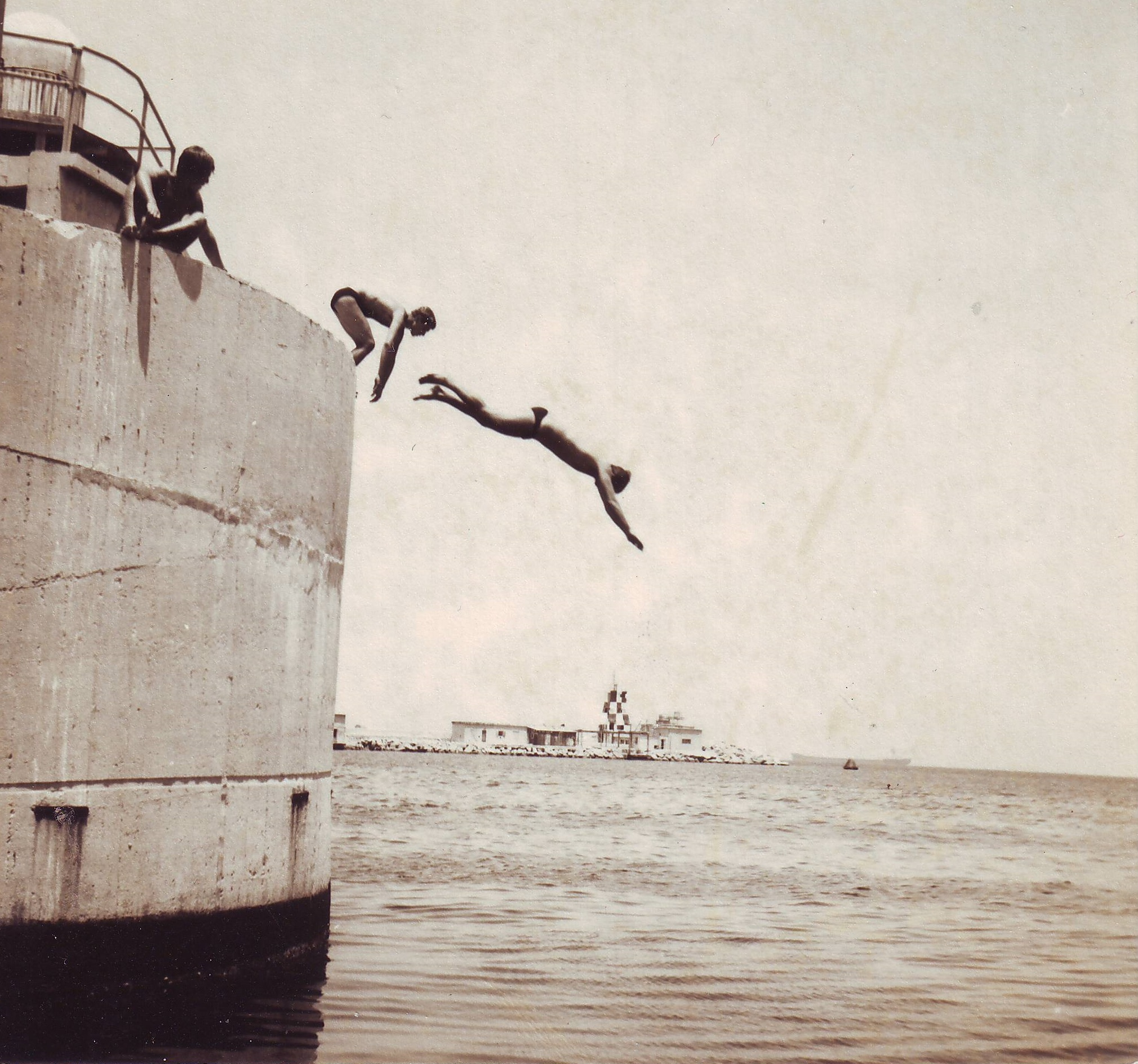
Sports day at the unit headquarters

Two technicians who were also the vessel operators were given a designated area for maintenance, the commander of the unit appointed Major George Golani as chief of maintenance.

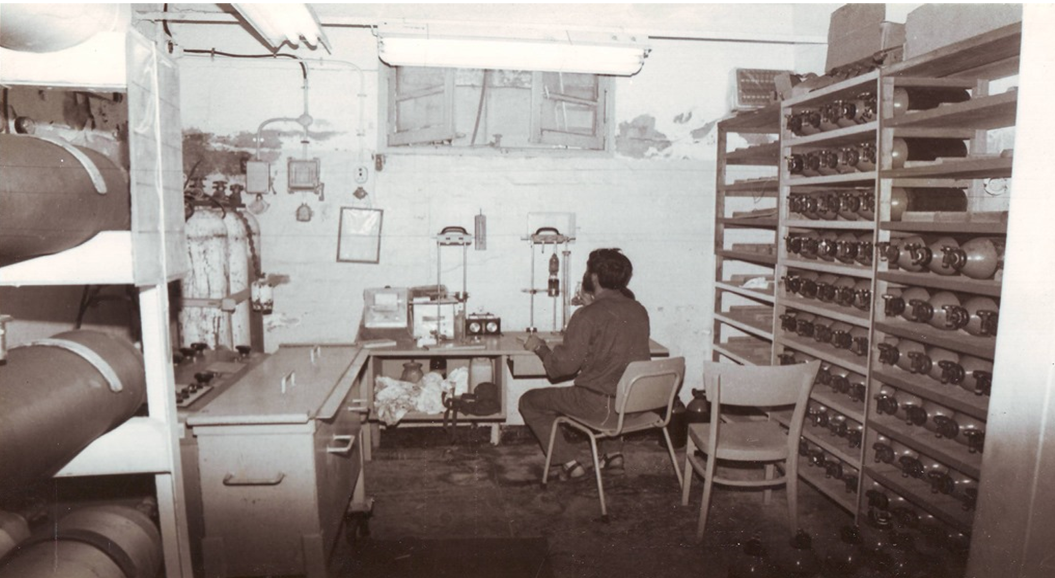
Compressor room in the maintenance area of the unit headquarters

During the War of Attrition the unit's numbers grew and its squads were permanently deployed in other locations. The diver squad of the Eilat Naval Base had nine divers who also carried out inspections of civilian Oil tankers. A similar force was in the Sharm el-Sheikh. The unit's headquarters remained in the Haifa naval base. After the Yom Kippur War, a large part of the unit stayed at the naval base in Fanara, west of Bitter Lakes. A squad of about ten people was at the naval base in Sharm el-Sheikh until the evacuation of Sinai Peninsula as part of Egypt–Israel peace treaty.

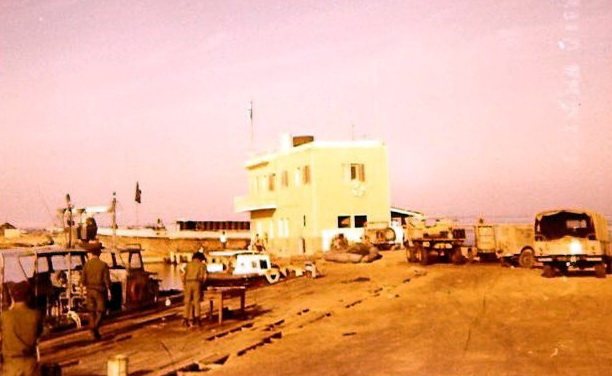
Fanara naval base serving as the unit base in 1974

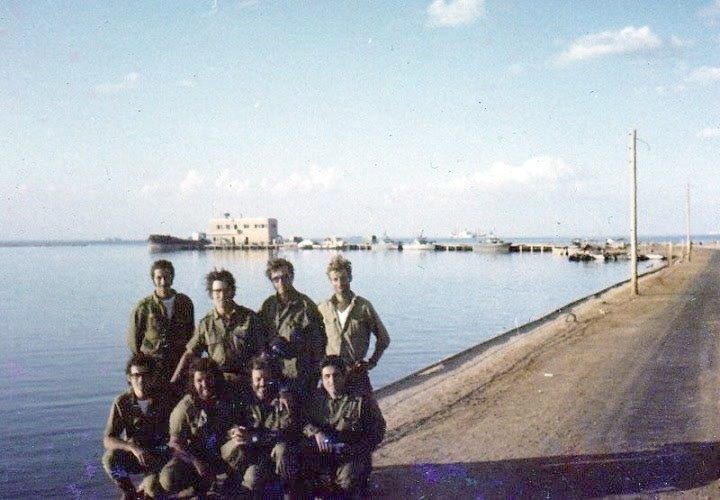
A view of Fanara naval base

== Selection and training ==
The required medical profile for joining the unit is 72-97 and a special emphasis is put on ears and pressure comparison. Women are also recruited in this unit since 2004.

The main method for joining the unit is through Shayetet 15 and then gradual progress. Before recruitment, psychotechnical tests and medical examinations are carried out and then they have to go on a voyage for two days on a Shayetet 15 vessel, it is not particularly physically difficult, but helps recruiters select the personnel according to their learning abilities, resilience and cooperation. Further training include a flooding room where personnel have to seal a room while it is being flooded, the vomiting boat with high physical stress being put on the body, drowning simulations and psychological challenges.

Then there is a day of medical testing at the Institute of Naval Medicine at the Haifa naval base. The qualifiers are then subjected to a two-day period including maritime training, a personal interview, a psychological and psychotechnical examination of the candidates, and more. Those who show outstanding performance join the unit while the rest join Shayetet 13 or the Snapir unit. These personnel will further have to train for a year.

The second way is outstanding performance in Shayetet 15 and a summon from the higher ups in the Israel Defense Forces. The training of such personnel lasts about 12 months in Bethlehem.

The training course is divided into two parts, each of which lasts about six months. In the first part the personnel are trained in basic seamanship, counterterrorism, advanced diving, use of specialized tools, photography, navigation amongst other things. The maritime training is mostly carried out in mixed gender teams and includes trips, diving at different times of the day and night, swimming, underwater navigation training, prolonged diving amongst others.

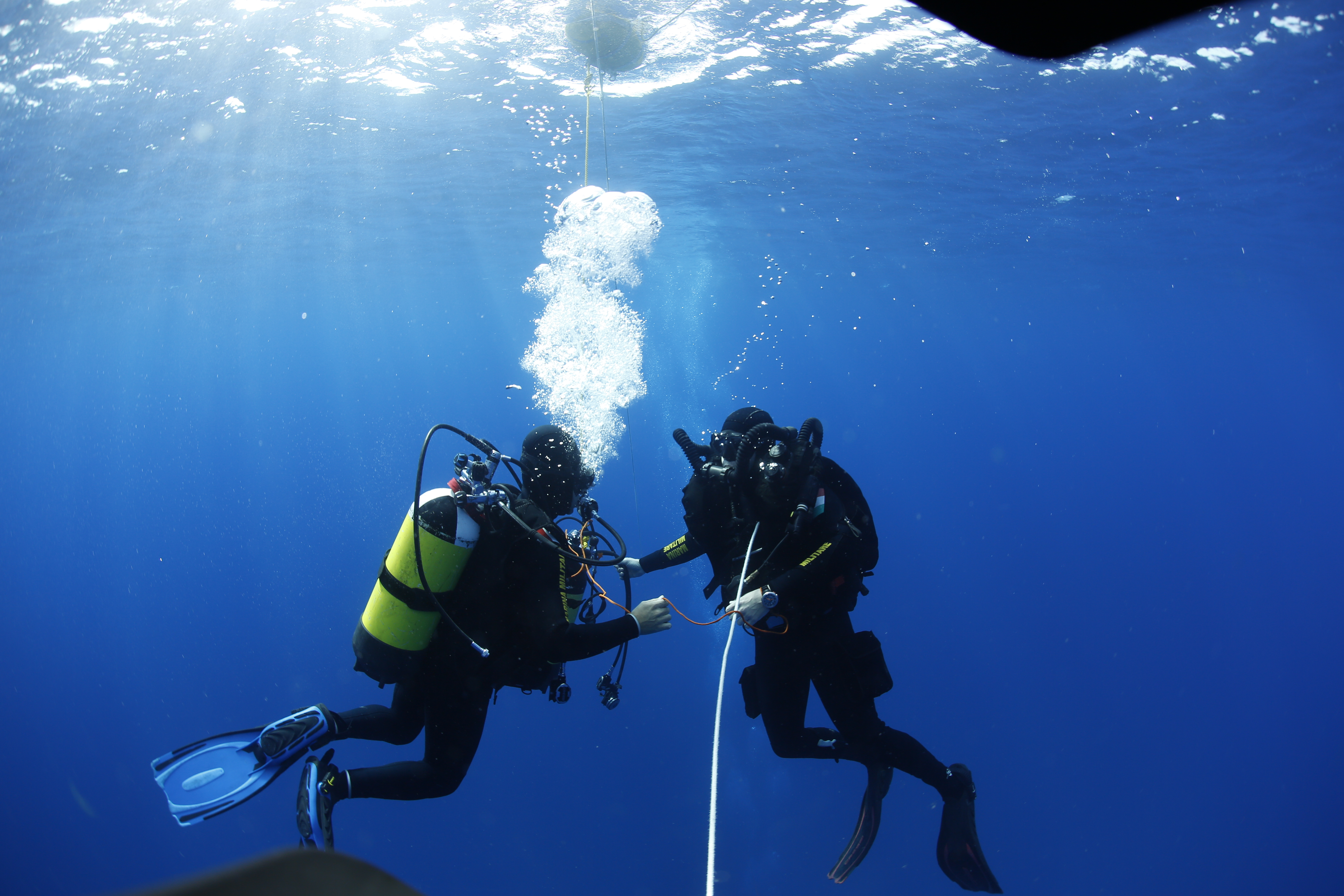
Swimming training of the unit

In the second part personnel learn professional diving, nitrox, activation of more complex measures under the surface of the water, rescue, detection and search, different command series, sabotage and bomb disposal.

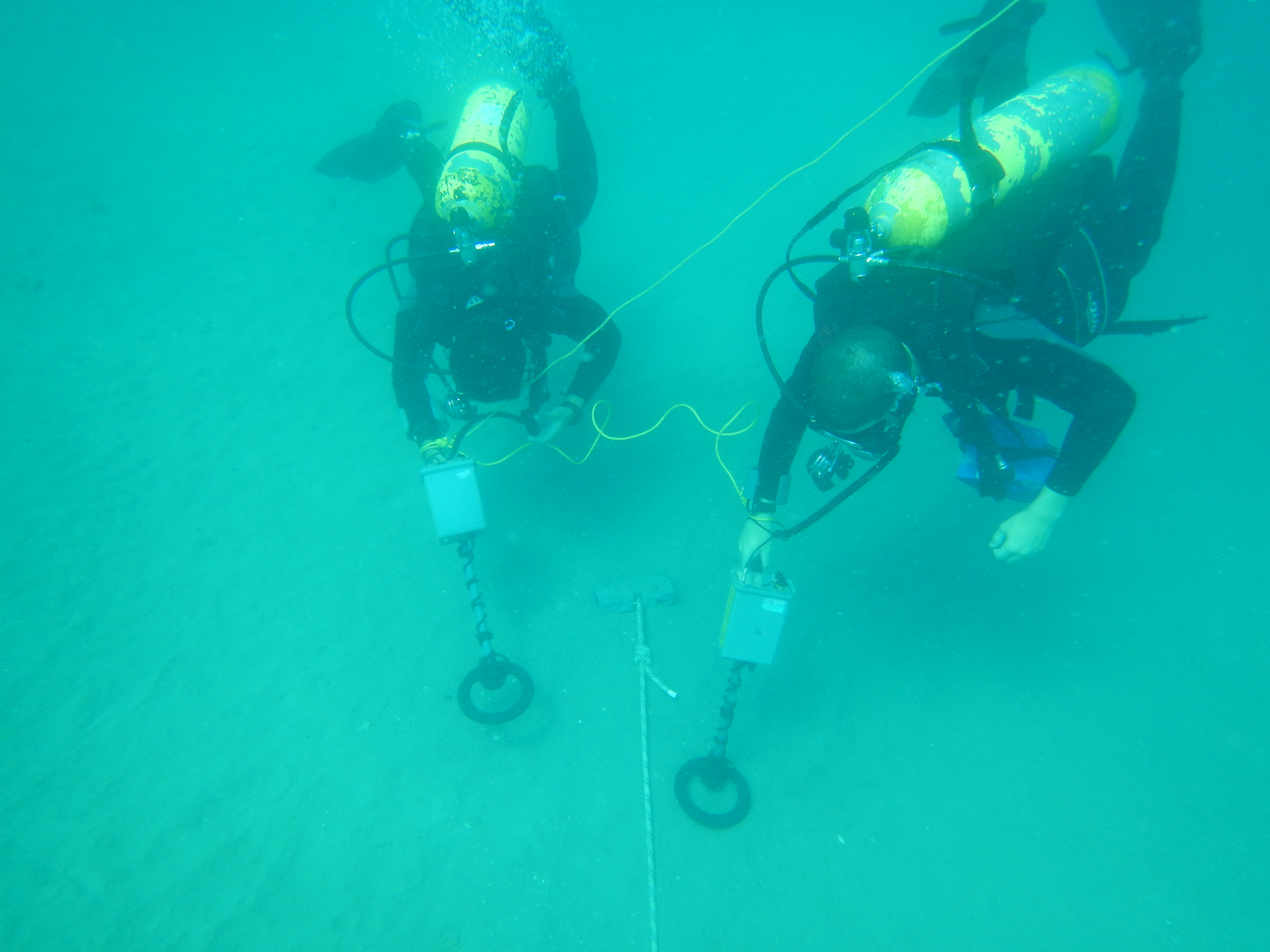
Underwater Detection Training of the unit personnel

After this soldiers receive their formal combat pins.

== Equipment ==
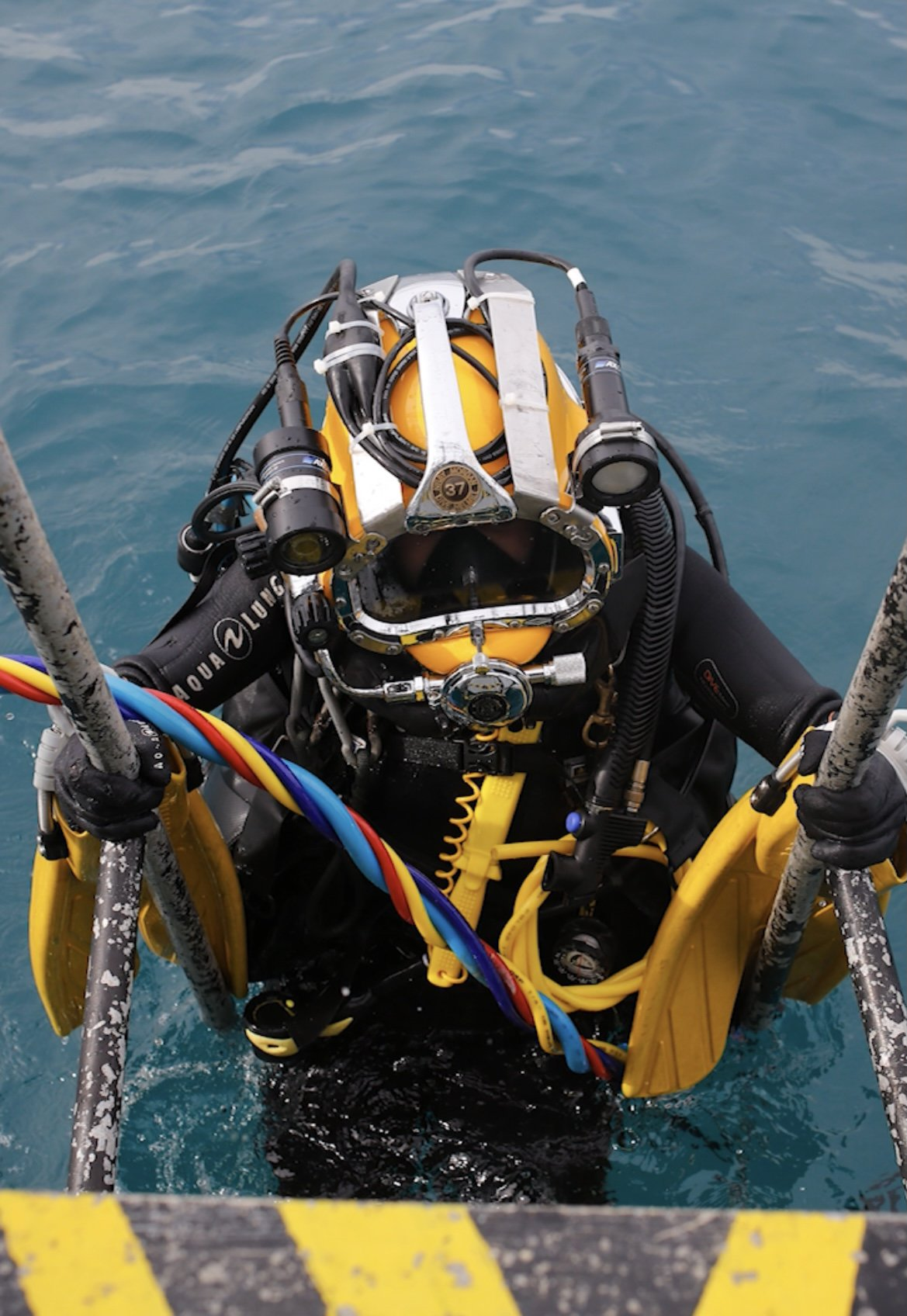
Fully Equipped personnel

The unit's diving equipment includes various configurations for Surface-supplied diving and Nitrox-supplied diving. Moreover Unmanned underwater vehicles, SONAR, Minisubs and other equipment are also utilized by the unit.

== History ==
=== Retrieval of a Gabriel missile ===
As a part of a presentation of fire to the Prime Minister of Israel, a Gabriel (missile) demonstration was carried out from a beach in southern Ashdod by launching it into the sea, but the missile couldn't be retrieved so the unit was dispatched to recover it. It was the first operational success of the unit. Another missile was lost during a test near Palmachim, again the unit was dispatched and the parts of missile were located and retrieved. The unit was also dispatched for the retrieval of an SS-11 anti-tank missile that fell into the ponds of Kibbutz Ha'on.

=== Retrieval of a Shayetet 13 vessel engine ===
An engine fell from a boat of Shayetet 13 in Haifa as it wasn't properly attached. The task of its retrieval was assigned to the unit. It was another successful mission for the unit.

=== Construction of Ashdod port ===
During the construction of the Port of Ashdod, the unit personnel carried out blasting at the bottom of the harbor to remove rocks that were interfering with the construction.

=== National Water Carrier of Israel ===
When the National Water Carrier of Israel was established, the unit received a mission to locate salt water channels under the water surface . Moreover, the unit was called to establish a protection system for Degania Dam at the Sea of Galilee to protect it against any possible Jordanian assault.

=== Tiran mine search ===
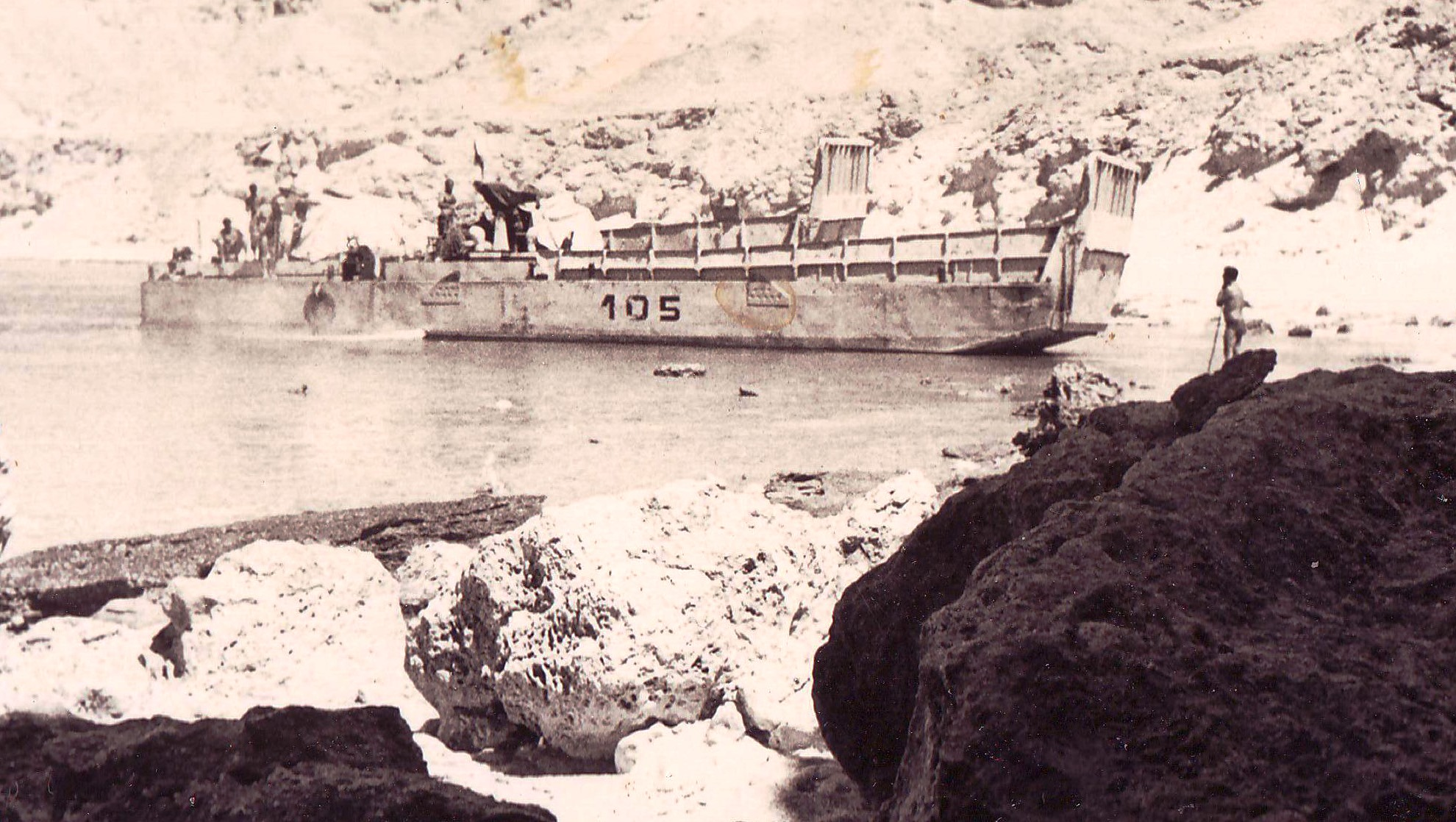
The unit mine searching operation in Tiran

After the Six Day War, during the Israeli occupation of Sinai, a mine searching team of twelve personnel along with a journalist were dispatched to the Straits of Tiran on June 10, 1967, in two vessels but due to high currents the mission wasn't carried out when water calmed down the search began but no mines were found.

=== Oil well inspections ===
On July 13, 1967, a squad of four unit personnel were dispatched to inspect oil production facilities in the Gulf of Suez and found them unharmed. Oil production was resumed and some personnel were stationed to monitor the oil wells.

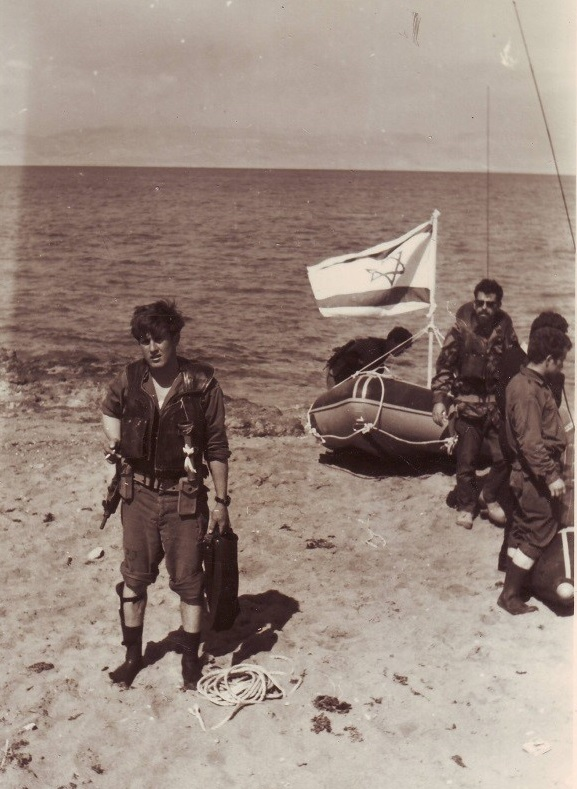
The squad carrying Uzis coming back after inspection on 13 July 1967

=== Anti hijacking operations ===
On July 16, 1967, an Egyptian ferry which was hijacked sailed towards Israel and seemed hostile. The unit along with Shayetet 13 raided the ferry at night and discovered it was operated via an underwater cable and was laden with 200 kg of explosives. The cable was disconnected and the explosives were removed. The vessel was then sailed to Israel.

=== Recovery of bodies from INS Eilat ===
INS Eilat sunk on October 21, 1967, most survivors and bodies were recovered that day. Next day the unit personnel scanned the ship's corridors, finding more bodies and removed equipment pieces so as not to let them into Egyptian hands. The trapped bodies were freed by explosion, two bodies and many body parts were then retrieved.

=== Jordan valley conflict ===
On 1 January 1968 Israeli and Jordanian forces also exchanged fire without known casualties. In March 1968, during the Battle of Karameh, Israelis attacked the town of Karameh, Jordan, the site of a major PLO camp. The goal of the invasion was to destroy Karameh camp and capture Yasser Arafat in reprisal for the attacks by the PLO against Israeli civilians, which culminated in an Israeli school bus hitting a mine in the Negev. However, plans for the two operations were prepared in 1967, one year before the bus incident. When Jordan saw the size of the raiding forces entering the battle it was led to the assumption that Israel had another goal of capturing Balqa Governorate to create a situation similar to the Golan Heights. Israel assumed that the Jordanian Army would ignore the invasion, but the latter fought alongside the Palestinians and opened heavy fire that inflicted losses upon the Israeli forces. The Israelis were repelled at the end of a day's battle, having destroyed most of the Karameh camp and taken around 141 PLO prisoners. Both sides declared victory. On a tactical level, the battle went in Israel's favor, and the destruction of the Karameh camp was achieved. However, the relatively high casualties were a considerable surprise for the IDF and was stunning to the Israelis. Although the Palestinians were not victorious on their own, King Hussein let the Palestinians take credit. In August, 1968 Israeli and Jordanian forces engaged in a battle along the Sea of Galilee involving artillery, mortars, and machine guns. For all these operations, the Unit 707 passed a cable between the banks of the Jordan River for the safe transport of Golani Brigade personnel across the river. The unit also retrieved dead bodies of Israeli soldiers as well as those of militants. On June 22, 1969, an operation was carried out by the Golani Brigade to disrupt the flow of water from Yarmouk. It was decided to blow up two water conveyors and water passages. Seven soldiers of Unit 707 under the command of Nadav Sela participated in the operation along with multiple squads of Golani Brigade performing security, reinforcement, barricading and other duties. The main task of planting the explosives was carried out by the unit and the canal system was successfully destroyed and wasn't repaired till the end of the War of Attrition.

=== Operation Raviv ===
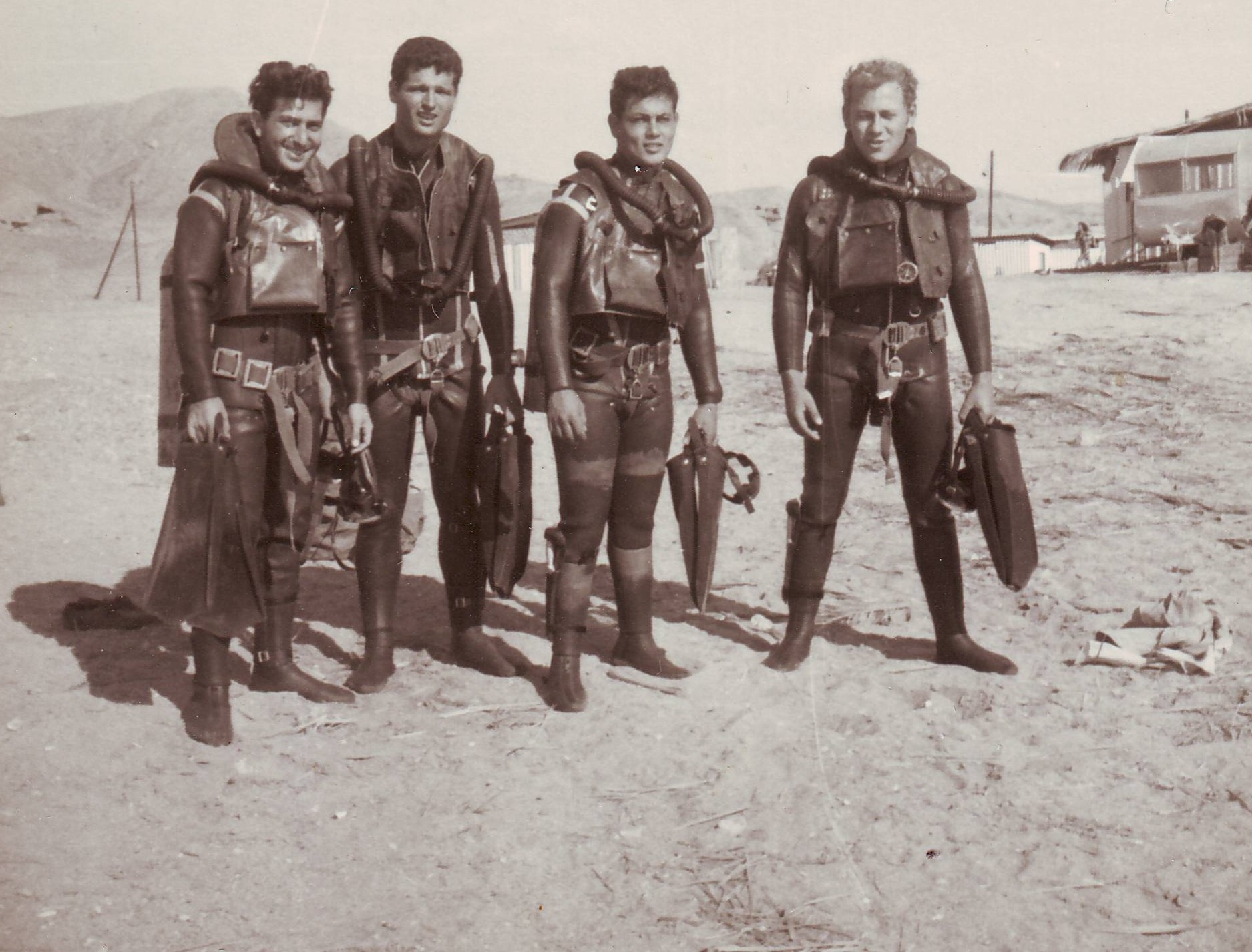
Unit 707 personnel during Operation Raviv

Before the start of Operation Raviv Unit 707 in rubber boats carried out reconnaissance missions along the Egyptian coast from the Ras Soder base and gained vital Intel for the operation. The operation went smoothly around 100-200 Egyptians were killed for only three Israeli casualties and after the end of the operation, the unit also played an important role in the evacuation of the force via Shayetet 11 vessels, one of these was stuck so unit 707 personnel moved it back into water by pushing it with an Armoured Personnel Carrier.

=== Egyptian Raids on Eilat ===
During an Egyptian raid on Eilat on November 15, 1969, a civilian ship High South was damaged and was put close to shore to prevent its sinking. Unit 707 repaired it and it was back into service. Another civilian ship Dahlia was damaged having three holes blown into it but they were in isolated compartments so the ship did not sink. On the night of February 5–6, 1970, the Egyptian naval commando attacked Eilat again sinking INS Bat Galim of Shayetet 11 and damaging INS Bat Sheva, the Unit 707 was engaged in the repair of INS Bat Sheva.

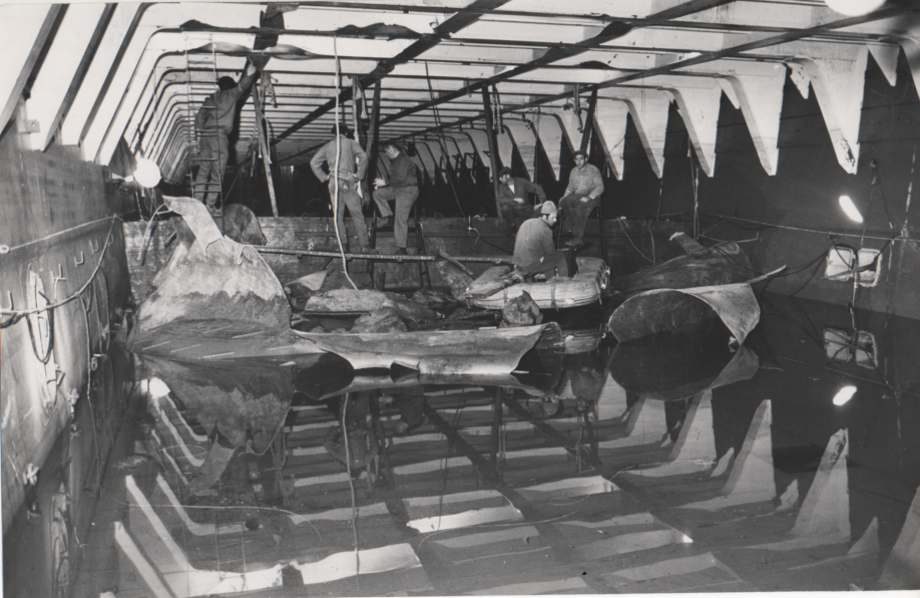
Unit 707 conducting repairs of INS Bat Sheva

=== Operation Sargent ===
On March 13, 1970, 16 "Shaked" Battalion fighters of Golani Brigade, six 707 fighters and a squad from the Marine Engineering Battalion attacked Egyptian positions in retaliation for repeated Egyptian Raids, the force landed across the Suez Canal inflicting heavy casualties of around 30-40 Egyptians killed while suffering only nine wounded in an operation that lasted for around an hour.

=== Sinking of Ovra ===
After the sinking of an Israeli civilian vessel on 13 May 1970, the unit and Shayetet 13 carried out an operation to retrieve the dead bodies, a body was found in the vessel and second washed ashore, the second task to locate the remains of Egyptian Styx missile wasn't accomplished.

=== Operation Victoria ===
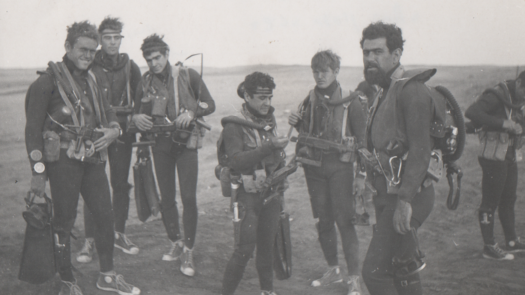
Unit 707 before operation Victoria

On June 11, 1970, the unit along with Shayetet 13 and Golani Brigade attacked Egyptian positions by crossing the Suez Canal. They were supported by artillery fire from an Armoured Brigade and airstrikes carried out by the Israeli Air Force. The operation was immensely successful and stopped any further raids from Egypt. At the end of the operation, the unit also evacuated the casualties.

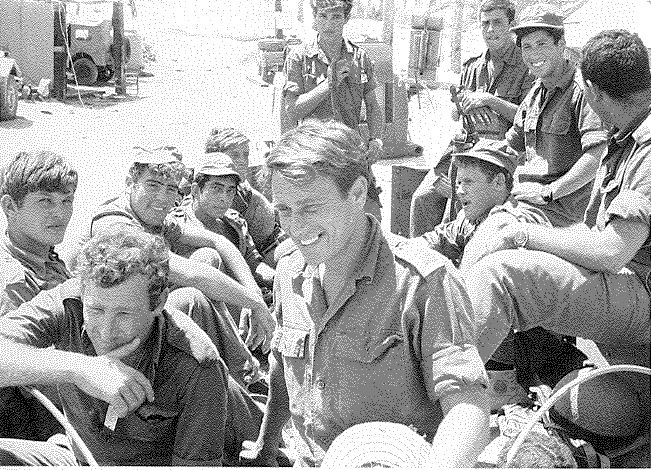
Unit personnel return after completing Operation Victoria

=== Operation Hood 20 ===
On January 14, 1971, a raid was carried out on militant bases in the town of Serfand, south of Sidon. The naval force consisted of six Shayetet 3 vessels. Firstly a paratrooper force landed and fire was opened on it. The force achieved its objectives while fighting and suffered five wounded. A secondary force composed of Shayetet 13 and Unit 707 personnel raided militant positions a kilometer further north.

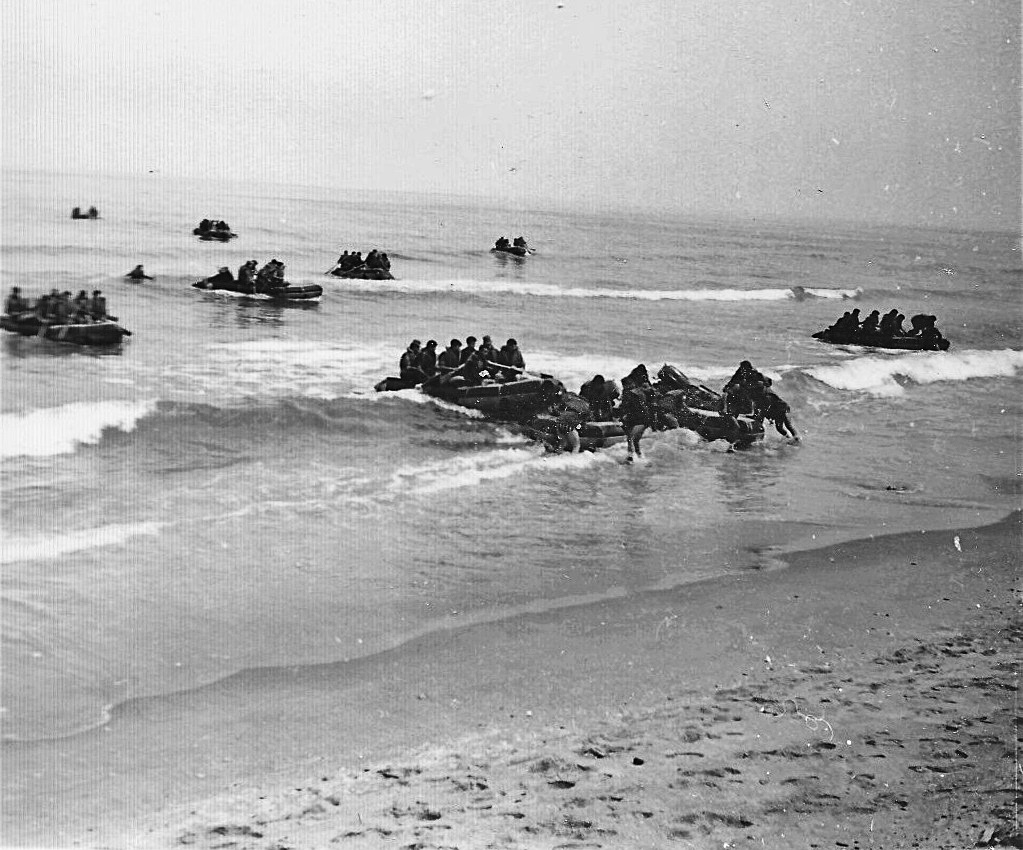
Unit personnel in the rehearsal of the operation Hood 20

=== Operations Abroad ===
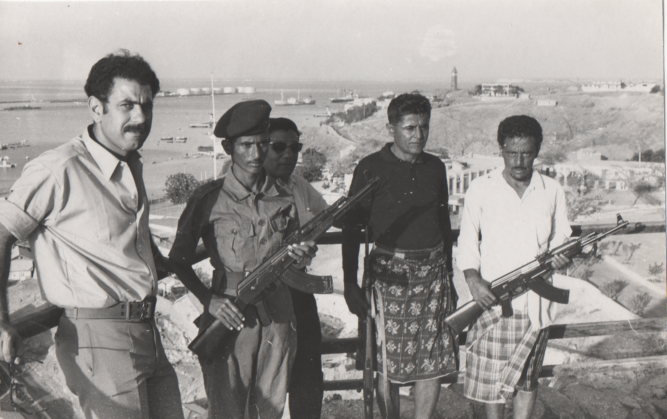
Unit commander Shaul Sela in Aden

In June 1971, militants attacked an Israeli ship "Coral C" so unit 707 personnel were sent in tankers on their way to the Kharg fuel terminal in Iran. In the Bab al Mandab, the unit secured the vessels with machine guns and RPGs. Also, in order to prevent any attacks by Egyptians, the unit personnel maintained a system of bottom checks to prevent sabotage at foreign ports.

=== Operation Spring of Youth ===
In the Operation Spring of Youth four militant targets were simultaneously attacked in Lebanon. On April 9, 1973, the raiders were led in front of Beirut by Shayetet 3. The Unit 707 personnel were involved in the attacks and then also in the evacuation of the strike force.

=== Operation Mosquito ===
On the night of October 9, 1973, a raid was conducted on the Egyptian coast in the Gulf of Suez. The ambush was carried out by a force from Unit 707 under the command of Lt. Col. Dov Bar and a second force from the Shayetet 13 under the command of Major Gadi They attacked vehicles and severed electricity lines.

=== Crossing the Suez ===
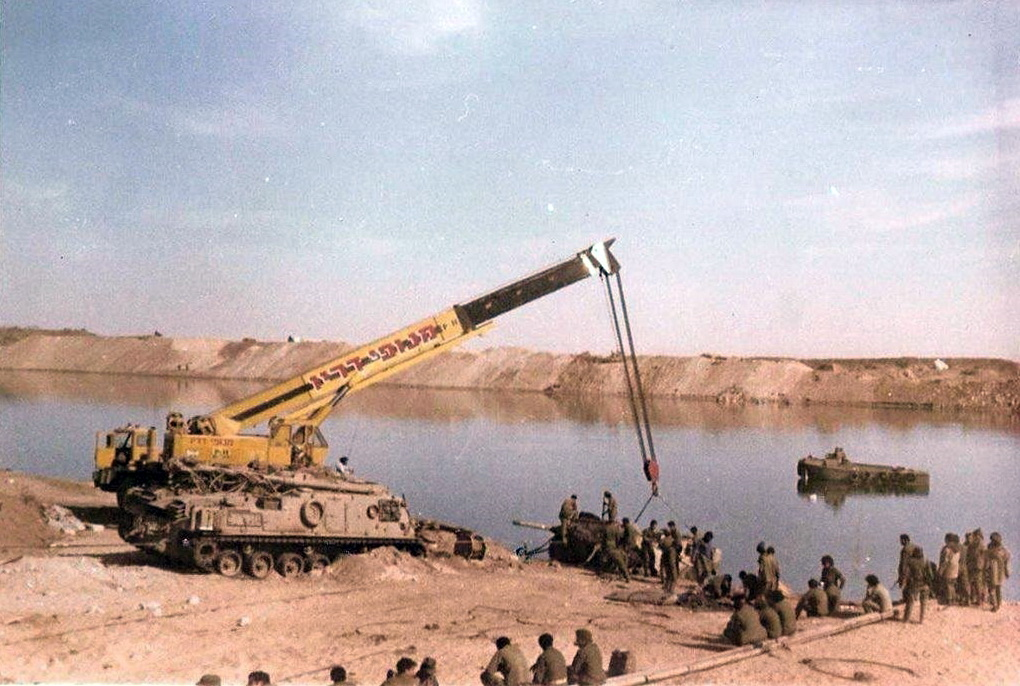
Unit 707 retrieving a sunken tank from Suez Canal

During the crossing of Suez Canal during the Yom Kippur War a force from Unit 707 assisted the Engineering Corps. They evacuated bodies of Egyptian soldiers stuck on bridges and assisted in rescuing tanks that had sunk into the water.

=== Operation Heavy ===
On October 17, 1973, divers from Unit 707 set sail in Shayetet 15 vessels. They located two communication facilities in the sea off Beirut and damaged them. The communication between Egypt and Syria was cut off.

=== Suez Bridge takeover ===
On October 23, 1973, a force of 10 Unit 707 personnel along with air support from Israeli Air Force carried out an operation in Suez, with the aim of taking control of a bridge that allowed the transfer of troops to the Third Egyptian Army.

=== Merger with Shayetet 13 ===
After the Yom Kippur War, the commander of the Navy, General Binyamin Talem, decided to merge Unit 707 with the 13th Fleet . The combination is done in two steps. At the beginning of 1974, a "small naval warfare unit" was established under the command of Col. Zvi Givati. In 1976, it was abolished and completely integrated.

=== Re-establishment ===
In 1981, the unit now named as YALTAM was again established but as a much more advanced unit .

=== Anti militant operations ===
In the 1980s, the unit personnel thwarted an attempted militant attack on Nitzanim Beach by two militants, capturing a huge cache of weaponry and ammunition. Similarly in the late 1980s, a militant attempted to infiltrate Rosh HaNkira, but was thwarted by a combined force of YALTAM and Shayetet 15. It also carried out a raid in Lebanon destroying motorcycles of militants.

=== Retrieval of Arrow Missile ===
YALTAM was also tasked with operational testing of Arrow missiles and on many occasions was also deployed to retrieve the fired missiles.

=== Search and Rescue Operations ===
Over the years, the unit personnel have participated in a large number of search and rescue operations including various operations in search of the missing IDF personnel in the Sea of Galilee and the search operations for the Dakar submarine. It was also a part of the task force to rescue a Shayetet 3 vessel off the coast of Saudi Arabia and the retrieval of a helicopter that had crashed 800m below sea level. In 2022, an Israeli Air Force helicopter crashed into the sea, YALTAM along with other units took part in its rescue and retrieval operation.

=== Gaza war ===
During the Gaza war, the YALTAM fighters are performing operations to locate underwater explosives and other such weaponry of Hamas and they've been shown to be highly successful in this regard.

== Cooperation with other units ==
The unit maintains close cooperation with various parties in the sea arm, such as the Shayetet 3, Shayetet 13, and Shayetet 11 as well as with other IDF and civilian units, such as the Home Front Command.

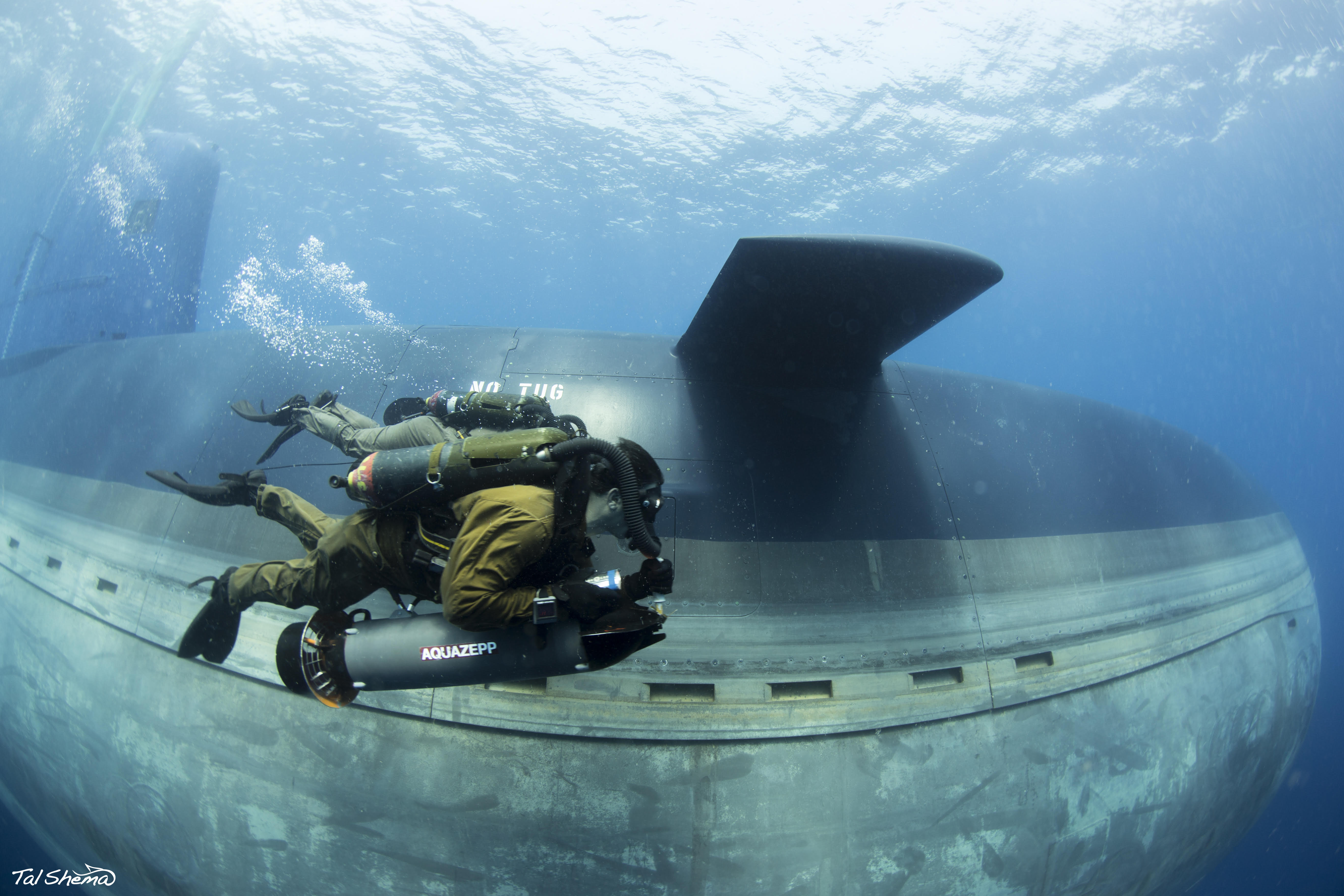
along with Shayetet 7

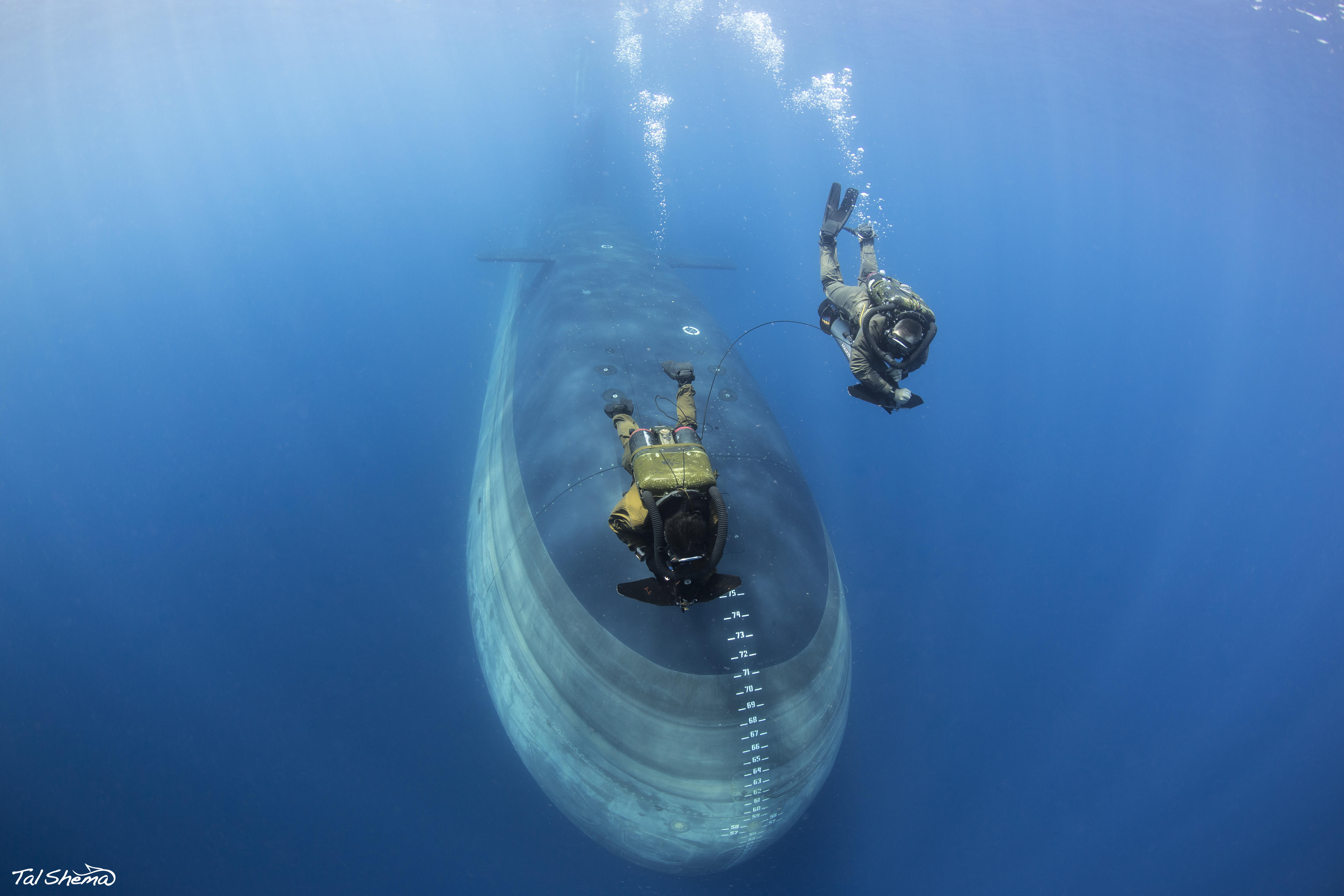
along with Shayetet 7

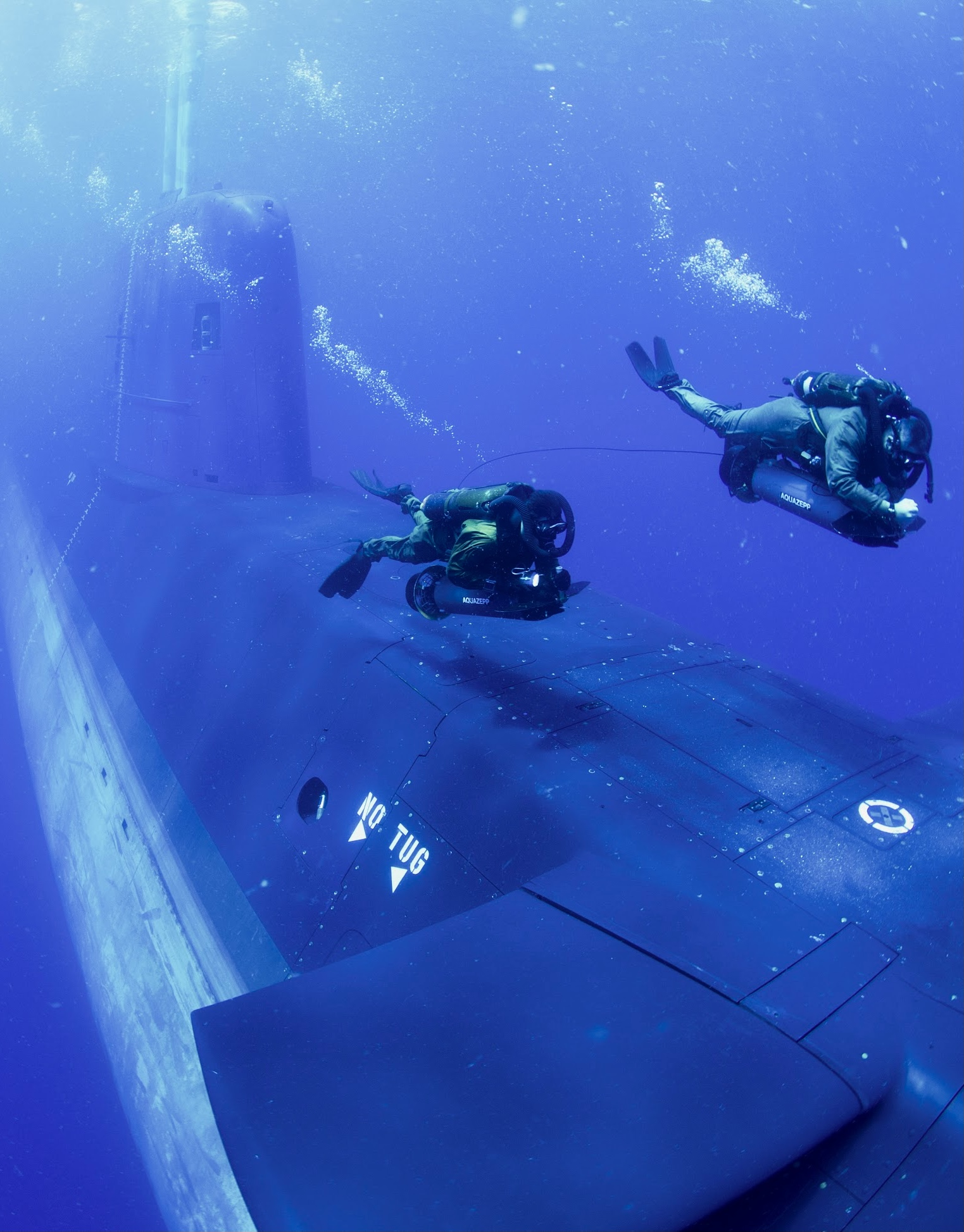
along with Shayetet 7

In addition, it is known to conduct joint operations and military exercises with foreign units including the French Navy and the American Navy.

== Commanders ==
Name	Period of tenure
Giora Nadiv	January 1981 - January 1983
Yossi Der	January 1983 - November 1987
Ilan Dovdvan	November 1987 - May 1993
Meir Man	May 1993 - November 1995
Moti Kern	November 1995 - July 2001
Mordi Alkovi	July 2001 - September 2008
Oren Rabha	September 2008 - August 2014
Ido Kaufman	August 2014 - September 2019
Oron Inbar	September 2019 - July 2024
Matan Bar	September 2024 -
