= Shayetet 11 =

Amphibious warfare unit of Israeli Navy

11th Flotilla
- שייטת הנחתות
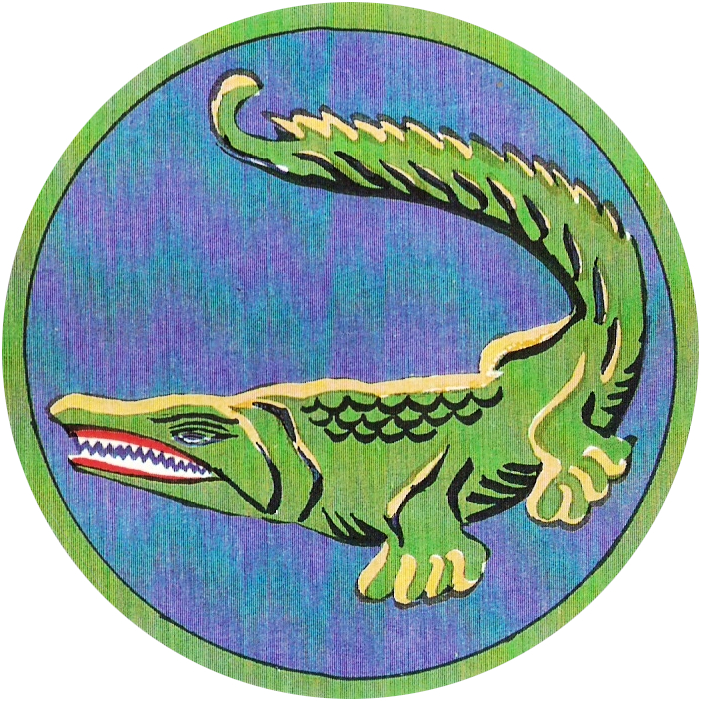
- Coat of arms of Shayetet 11
- Active: 1948-1957, 1964-1993, 2022-present
- Country: Israel
- Branch: Israeli Navy
- Type: Amphibious warfare flotilla
- Size: 2 Ships (Currently with plans for more)
- Part of: Israeli Navy
- Garrison/HQ: Ashdod Naval Base
- Nickname: Amphibious Flotilla

Commanders
- Notable commanders: #Commanders

Insignia
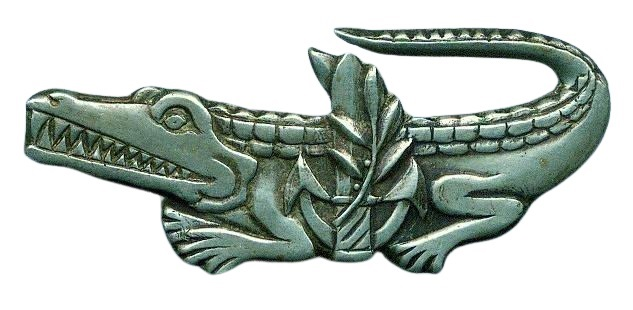
- Warrior pin

The Landing flotilla officially known as the Shayetet 11 is the Amphibious warfare fleet of the Israeli Navy. It is tasked with amphibious landings and logistics. The unit established during the 1948 Palestine war was abolished in 1993 and was re-established in 2022.

== Roles ==
The function of the unit is amphibious landings and naval encirclement. In preparation for the 1948 Palestine war, its role was defined as the creation of coastal bridgeheads and transport of supplies to isolated settlements. The flotilla took part and many operations in several wars until it was abolished in 1993. It was re-established in 2022 and was operational in 2024 during the Israeli invasion of Gaza.

== Fleet ==
The table below includes the vessels that were used by the flotilla.

Name	Service	Notes	Commanders	Photo
INS Hanna Senesh (Sh-29)	1948–1951	In Operation Ben Ami, a force from the Carmeli Brigade landed in the captivity of Zion and evacuated the families of kibbutzim the Western Galilee to the Port of Haifa. Brought a force from the 22nd Battalion of the Carmeli Brigade to raid the Litani bridges - "Operation Kathriel" which was canceled due to the entry of the first ceasefire (June 11, 1948)	Israel Averbuch; Shaul Avni	
2 British tank landing crafts		Length 48 meters, width 9 meters, thrust 300 tons, 3 propellers, 10.5 knots. Charger: up to 5 tanks weighing 30 tons; or 3 tanks weighing 50 tons; or 9 trucks; or 250 tons.		
INS Nevertheless	July 1948 – 1958	Originally a missile boat LCT(r)-147 landing Battalion training, during the Tripartite Aggression. It was planned to land a force in the Gaza. The landing craft is on display at the Israeli Navy Museum		
INS Gush Etzion (F-39)	July 1948 – 1957	Originally tank landing craft LCT-256, also known as "Perto". It practiced landings on the shores of the Mediterranean Sea (1949) during training exercises.		
2 German tank landing crafts		Length 36 meters, width 10 meters, thrust 300 tons, 3 propellers, 10 knots.		
INS Yad Mordechai (P-25)	1948–1957			
INS Beit Arava (P-33)	1948–1957			
2 American amphibious craft		Length 48.5 meters, width 8.5 meters, displacement 387 tons, 2 propellers, 14 knots.		
INS Ramat Rachel (P-51)	December 30, 1948 – 1960	Collection of war booty from the Sinai coast and the capture of the MiG-15 from the Lake Bardawil and the Battle of the Chinese Farm.	Hadar Kimchi; Yehuda Ben-Zur; Meir Lubochinsky	
INS Nitzanim (P-53)	December 30, 1948 –			
6 American Tank landing craft		Length 15 meters, width 4.3 meters, thrust 60 tons, 2 propellers, 11 knots. They were used to transport AMX-13 tanks.		
INS Machs (32,38 & 40)		Security patrols and Operation Kinneret		
4 Amphibious Assault Ships	1949–1967	Two ships assisted by providing cover from the during the battle of Taba. Four ships assisted the 9th Brigade's advance along the Sinai coast.	Gad Asher	
3 36m Landing Crafts		length 36 meters, width 6 meters, displacement 122 tons, 2 propellers, 10 knots and can carry two tanks or five BTR APCs		
INS Etzion Geber (P-51)	March 1962 – 1982	Participated in Operation Raviv Was transferred to the Mediterranean Sea during the 1982 Israeli invasion of Lebanon, was returned to Eilat for decommissioning, remained in Eilat and was used as a base for fish farming. It was transferred to Letron in October 2016 for conservation.	Rabbi Chaval Yitzchak Aharonovich, Yosef Harari, Ehud Aral, Uri Sela, Israel Petchnik, Yigal Bar Yosef, Yaakov Abarshi, Shoki Bornstein, Mordechai Dekel, Moshe Miller	
INS Caesarea (P-53)	October 15, 1964 – March 1983	Operation Raviv was transferred to Ashdod by land, returned to Eilat via the Suez Canal and transferred again to the Mediterranean Sea during the 1982 Israeli invasion of Lebanon	Yaakov Nitzan, Shmuel Shabach, Yosef Diamant, Shaul Horev, Yossi Levy, Hugo Shimron, Haim Markowitz, Gershon Neve, Yaron Goldstein,	
INS Shekmona (P-55)	May 13, 1965 – March 1983	Operation Raviv	David Ezer, Aryeh Harel, Shmuel Sharig, Tsiki Hakhalai, Arie Amitai	
3 60m Landing Craft		Length 60 meters, width 10 meters, displacement 730 tons, 3 propellers, 10.5 knots can carry 6 Centaurion tanks or 16 APCs		
Tamsah (SG 20)	War of Attrition	An open barge consists of 20 floating units and is driven by two external engines.	Combat Engineering Corps (Israel)	
INS Ashdod (P-61)	March 23, 1967 –	The June 1967 war and 1982 Israeli invasion of Lebanon, sold for commercial use	Yaakov Nitzan, Yosef Harari, Avi Rothman, Moshe Levy, Nimrod Gilad, Michy Ringert, Danny Carmeli, Rafi Binyamin	
INS Ashkelon (P-63)	May 19, 1967 –	Six Day War, Shayetet 13 assault on Port Said in Operation Lady, sold to Eritrea	Yaakov Nitzan, David Ezer, Gabi Shilo, Amnon Tadmor, Nati Motoki, Omer Levbi, Udi Yoshua	
INS Akziv (P-65)	June 1967 –	Operation Birds of Eden, participated in the 1982 Israeli invasion of Lebanon, later sold to Eritrea.	Shmuel Shevah, Shamai Bar-On, Reuven Paamoni, Avi Shaf, Omer Levbi, Udi Yoshua,	
MS AMALIA	June 1967	Temporarily leased from a Greek owner during Six Day War	R/H Rami Zolberg	
INS Bat Yam (T-83)	1968–	Originally a Dutch merchant ship, displacement 1250 tons, speed 10 knots, shot down an Egyptian plane during the Yom Kippur War. Sailed to South Africa and refueled a pair of Saar 2 ships in Operation Beauty	Rabbi Uzi Tzulof, Rabbi Aharon Marni, Mike Elder, David Atzmon, Moshe ben-Yashi, David ben Bashat, Yehoshua Marom, Raphael Zandberg	
INS Bat Galim (T-81)	1968–1970	Originally a Dutch merchant ship, length 80 m, width 16 m, displacement 2500 tons, speed 9 knots, crew 35 people, sunk by Egyptian commandos in the port of Eilat	Major Zeev Ariel	
3 American LSM tank landing amphibious craft		Length 60 meters, width 10 meters, displacement 1095 tons, 2 propellers, 12.5 knots. Capable of sailing in the open seas that saw use in the World War. The tank deck is above the waterline, a high ratio of engine power to thrust, powerful pumps for transferring water to the bow tanks, a sharp bow front door and a separate long drawbridge.		
INS Ofir (F-91)	1970–1976	Yom Kippur War	Arie Marmari, Yigal Bar Yosef, Zev Goldatsky, Moti Michaeli Raphael Zandberg	
INS Sheba (P-93)	1970–1976		Uri Sela	
INS Tarshish (P-95)	1970–1973	Later used as a housing unit		
INS Bat Sheva (F-57)	June 1969 – 1990	Length 95 meters, width 11.5 meters, displacement 1892 tons, 4 propellers, 11 Nozaite connection. Carrying capacity of 12 tanks Centaurion tanks in the warehouse deck and 24 APCs M-113 in the upper deck. Transported many forces during the 1982 Israeli invasion of Lebanon. After retirement it was sunk in a naval exercise	Zvi Givati, Shaul Horev, Mike Elder, Chaim Geva, Aryeh Marmari, Yossi Levy, Marom Yehoshua, Mordechai Dekel, Danny Carmeli, Gershon Neve, Aharon Shapir, Yitzchak Cremona	
Gal-Noa A\M Dan	1970	Exercises		
INS Bat Galim 2	March 1978 –	Made in Japan, 96 m, width 19 m, 12 knots. Engaged in Operation Moshe and landed an armored combat vehicle in the 1982 Israeli invasion of Lebanon	Major Aryeh Gabish, Major Ilan Bokhris, Major Uzi Tishel, Major Rafi Binyamin	
A/M Yasmin		Participated in 1982 Israeli invasion of Lebanon for the landing of an artillery group in the port of Beirut	Lt. Col. Udi Aral, R/H Micha Zand, Eli Yaffe	
INS Nachshon	August 2023 – present	Israeli invasion of Gaza		
INS Kommiat	June 2024 – present			

== History ==
=== Establishment ===
Before the 1948 Palestine war the Palmach submitted a proposal to David Ben-Gurion in which the duties of the Israeli Navy were defined including amphibious assaults, reinforcement of operations, protection of coastal settlements, transportation of landing troops and vehicles, supply of fuel and equipment were included for which a specialised landing unit "Shayetet 11" was established.

=== 1948 Palestine war ===
==== Supply missions ====
During the war, Nahariya was cut off from the rest of Israeli territory so the supply of troops and equipment to the isolated area was carried out by sea. On May 12–13, 1948, the 22nd Battalion of the Carmeli Brigade was transferred from the Port of Haifa to Nahariya. In addition, about 15 tons of supplies were transferred for the Hanita and Mitzva settlements, 3 tons of explosives and ammunition, 1000 gallons of gasoline and medical supplies. On May 14/15, 300 women and children, who were evacuated from the Western Galilee were evacuated to Haifa by the Flotilla.

==== Operation Ben Ami ====
Operation Ben-Ami began on the night of May 14, 1948 with the occupation of Tel Acre. This occupation allowed the passage of the convoy that left the Ein al-Faretz to the north. The naval force of the Flotilla (transporting 22nd battalion of Carmeli Brigade) landed at 02:30 on the beach of Shebi Zion and began to attack the village of Samaria from the north. In the morning the force arrived at Nahariya. From there the force continued to the village of Aziv which was captured.

==== Operation Kathreil ====
This operation was a planned naval landing on the coast of Lebanon. The operation was set to take place on June 9, 1948. On June 10, the troops boarded INS Hana Sanesh and set sail. When they were close to the target location in Lebanon, a cancellation order was received due to a truce about to take effect.

==== Operation Death to the Invader ====
During the Operation Death to the Invader Israel Defense Forces attacked Beit 'Affa by a company of the Flotilla and 54th battalion of the Givati Brigade. The naval unit advanced through a wadi from the north, hoping to surprise the Egyptians, but were in fact spotted while preparing to set up. At midnight, they emerged and attacked in two prongs, and despite heavy fire, managed to capture a frontal position and pushed ahead to the center of the village, setting up there and exchanging fire with the Egyptians.

==== Operation Horev ====
During Operation Horev a battalion of the Golani Brigade and personnel from Shayetet 11 launched a diversionary attack on positions near Gaza City-Rafah road, however the vessels of Shayetet 11 were not used and instead rubber boats were used due to convert nature of the operation.

=== Operation Olive Leaves ===
During Operation Olive Leaves, Aharon Davidi's 771 Reserve Paratrooper Battalion as well as units from the Nahal Brigade and Givati Brigade commenced their attack. The complex operation involved a two-column attack from the north and south, which included both infantry and armored vehicles, as well as an amphibious assault conducted by troops of the Flotilla who crossed the sea by boat.

=== Tripartite Aggression ===
==== Operation Kadesh ====
During Operation Kadesh, three amphibious vehicles were sent from Eilat to Sharm-e-Sheikh with AMX-13 tanks on them . Additional landings took place on the coasts of Gaza and Sinai for logistical purposes including the seizure of an Egyptian MiG-15 that landed in Lake Bardawil.

==== Battle of the Chinese Farm ====
During the Battle of the Chinese Farm Matt's brigade began moving to Tasa at 4:30 pm on October 15, before turning eastwards on Akavish. The paratrooper brigade faced problems in acquiring the boats and transports assigned to it. But they ultimately had to use the flotilla boats.

=== Construction of new vessels ===
Before the Six Day War, the Flotilla acquired new vessels from the budget allocated by the Finance ministry, following vessels were acquired

- INS Etzion Gebr (P-51) on March 2, 1962. First Commander Captain Yitzhak (Ike) Aharonovich .
- INS Caesarea (P-53) on October 15, 1964. First commander Yaakov Nitzan.
- INS Shikmona (P-55) on May 13, 1965.
- INS Ashdod (P-61) on March 23, 1967, its first commander was Major Yosef Harari, who was the commander of naval voyages.
- INS Ashkelon (F-63) on May 19, 1967, its first commander was Ya'akov Nitzan .
- INS Akziv (P-65) on August 1, 1967, its first commander was Major Shmuel Shabach.

=== Prelude to Six Day War ===
Before the Six Day War the AMX-13 tanks were placed on the south coast and moved to the north of the gulf. The Flotilla vessels were also brought ashore and hidden in a wadi behind the base.

=== Six Day War ===
During the Six Day War, the Flotilla in the Gulf of Aqaba accompanied the Paratroopers Brigade on its way south, provided cover and even landed tanks in the Gulf of Sharm el-Sheikh.

=== War of Attrition ===
==== Operation Raviv ====
During Operation Raviv "Pinko" Harel's small force of about a hundred men, six Tiran 5s and three BTR-50s, landed on the Egyptian coast at 03:37AM on the morning of September 9. Delivered by three vessels of the Flotilla to a beachhead secured by Shayetet 13, Harel's force landed at El Hafair, 40 kilometres (25 mi) south of Suez and 20 kilometres (12 mi) south of the anchorage at Ras Sadat. Laden with extra fuel and ammunition supplied by the Flotilla, the force headed south, wreaking havoc behind Egyptian lines and attacking installations along the way. The first of these was the Egyptian Army camp and radar site at Abu Darag, which by 07:17 had been secured.

==== Eilat raid ====
In 1970, Egyptian naval commando carried out a sabotage operation at Eilat Naval Base and damaged a vessel of the Flotilla INS Bat Sheva lander sank the INS Bat Galim.

=== Yom Kippur War ===
==== Operation Lady ====
The Flotilla participated in the Operation Lady. On October 16, 1973, a group of Flotilla vessels led the Shayetet 13 to attack Port Said. The operation was carried out successfully and multiple Egyptian vessels were damaged or destroyed.

==== Operation Green light ====
The Flotilla participated in the Operation Green Light which was to carry out an amphibious landing on Egyptian Red Sea coast but the operation was aborted mid way.

==== Operation Abirey-Halev ====
During the Operation Abirey-Halev, On the night of 15 October, 750 personnel of Colonel Matt's 55th Paratroopers Brigade crossed the canal in rubber dinghies. They were soon joined by tanks and additional infantry transported via the vessels of the Flotilla. The force encountered no resistance initially and fanned out in raiding parties, attacking supply convoys, SAM sites, logistic centers and anything else of military value, with priority given to the SAMs. Attacks on SAM sites punched a hole in the Egyptian anti-aircraft screen and enabled the IAF to strike Egyptian ground targets more aggressively.

=== Operation Birds of Eden ===
Three vessels of the Flotilla were transferred from Ashdod Naval Base to Eilat Naval Base by circumnavigating around Africa, It was codenamed "Operation Birds of Eden". The first vessel left on August 20, 1974, and the last arrived on October 30, 1974.

=== Prelude to the 1982 Israeli invasion of Lebanon ===
The flotilla vessels participated in the Lebanese Civil War to supply weapons and ammunition to the Christian phalanges forces in Lebanon usually by landing to the port of Jounieh.

=== Operation Litani ===
The flotilla took part in 1978 South Lebanon conflict against militants on the northern shores of Lebanon, without landing troops. The vessels were used as carrier platform for helicopters that attacked targets on the Lebanese coast.

=== 1982 Israeli invasion of Lebanon ===
The flotilla participated in the 1982 Israeli invasion of Lebanon. On June 6, 1982, Israeli forces under direction of Defense Minister Ariel Sharon launched a three-pronged invasion of southern Lebanon in "Operation Peace for Galilee". Roughly 60,000 troops and more than 800 tanks, heavily supported by aircraft, attack helicopters, artillery, and missile boats, crossed the Israel–Lebanon border in three areas. Simultaneously, Israeli armor, paratroopers, and naval commandos set sail in amphibious landing ships from Ashdod Naval Base towards the Lebanese coast north of Sidon. Israel's publicly stated objective was to push PLO forces back 40 kilometers (25 mi) to the north. An Israeli amphibious operation was conducted north of Sidon, beginning with a diversionary bombardment of targets away from the landing zone by missile boats and aircraft. Two groups of commandos from the Shayetet 13 naval commando unit then came ashore to probe enemy defenses and secure the landing site, one of which swam to the mouth of the Awali River and another which came ashore on the landing beach in rubber dinghies. After a brief gunbattle with armed Palestinians, the main landings began, with paratroopers coming ashore in rubber dinghies to establish a beachhead followed by three landing craft that unloaded troops and armor. Over the following days, the three landing ships moved between Israel and Lebanon, shuttling more troops and armor onto the beachhead.

==== Specialised units ====
Givati Brigade and a battalion from Golani Brigade were specially trained to act along with flotilla in wartime situations. They were given necessary training to transfer armoured vehicles as well as to assist in transport of tanks.

=== Dismantling of flotilla ===
In August 1993 all of flotilla vessels were taken out of service as they were deemed vulnerable and State-of-the-art fast landing craft were not defined as an operational necessity. So, some were sold to Eritrea while rest were sunk in naval exercises.

=== Re-establishment ===
In May 2022 it was announced that the Navy decided to re-establish the amphibious fleet, following this the IDF held an amphibious landing exercise in Cyprus and purchased two LSV vessels which will be used by the Israeli Navy to conduct amphibious landings as well as to transport supplies.

The flotilla is operated from Ashdod Naval Base. The first amphibious vehicle, INS Nachshon, was delivered to the Navy in August 2023. The second landing vessel, INS Kommiat, arrived in Israel in June 2024. The squadron became fully operational in 2024 and participated in the Israeli invasion of Gaza.

== Commanders ==
It is usually commanded by a single commander but from 1967 to 1978, the command was distributed between two sectors, one housed at Ashdod Naval Base while second at Eilat Naval Base. The dual command was abolished in 1978.

Ashdod (Main) Command
Name	Service	Note	Photo
Israel Auerbach	1948–1949	Establishment	
Yitzhak Gazit	1953–1955		
Yehuda ben-Zur	1955–1956	Tripartite Aggression	
Gap in command	1957–1964	The flotilla was closed	
Baruch Brushi	1964–1967	Six Day War	
Yosef Harari	1966–1967		
Shmuel Shabach	1967–1968	Command split	
Aryeh Shafer	1968–1970	War of Attrition and integration of helicopters	
Musa Levy	1970–1972		
Haim Raz	1972 – December 1973	Yom Kippur war	
Mike Elder	December 1973 - August 1974	Operation Bids of Eden	
Yosef Yohanan	1974		
Micha Zand	September 1974 – May 1975		
Yigal Bar-Yosef	June 1975 – 1977	Aid operations for the Lebanese forces including landings on the beaches of Jounieh and in towing barges loaded with ammunition.	
Emmanuel Dror	1977–1978	The construction of Bas Dafna	
Haim Lahav	1978–1981		
Mike Elder	1982 – July 1983	Second term, 1982 Israeli invasion of Lebanon	
Jacob Reva	April–July 1983		
Dodo Iber	July 1983 – August 1985		
Isaiah Patuka	August 1985 – September 1987	Integration of Givati Brigade	
Rafi Binyamin	September 1987 – June 1989		
Yigal Bar Yosef	July 1989 – 1992		
Emmanuel Avraham	1992 – August 1993	Closure	

Red Sea Command (1967–1978)
Name	Service	Note	Photo
Major Shmuel Shabach	June–August 1967	Establishment	
Major Yosef Harari	August 1967 –		
Major Miki Ra'anan	April–December 1968		
Zev Yehezkali	1969–1972	The War of Attrition and Operation Raviv	
Haim Geva	1972–1973		
Yossi Levy	1973–1974	Yom Kippur War	
Musa Levy	1974	Operation Birds of Eden	
Marom Yehoshua	1976–1977		
Mordechai Dekal	1977-1978	Abolishment	

== Sources ==
- נחתות On the website of the Navy Association (Israel)
- 22nd Battalion Veterans Association, מבצע כתריאל והאניה חנה סנש, on the website of the battalion
- Pinchas Pick, הנחתות בין עזה לאל עריש, "Marine Systems", LA, December 1956, p. 56
- Benjamin Schiff הנחתות ירדו לשארם א שייך, 'Naval Systems' 37–38, The Decade File for the Navy, July 1958, p. 142
- M. Ron, נחתות במערכה "Marine Systems" Booklet No. 85-86, July 1967, pp. 49–50
- Uri Porat, נחתתי באל עריש "Marine Systems" Booklet No. 85-86, July 1967 pp. 51–52
- Yehuda Ben-Zur, פינוי תחמושת שלל מאל - עריש, 'Marine Systems' 62, December 1962, p. 8
- Yehuda Ben-Zur, שייטת הנחיתה במבצע קדש, "Marine Systems" 94, June 1969, pp. 25–22
- אלבום תמונות נחתות 2012
- Dear Jonah, נחתת הטנקים שלנו, 'Marine Systems' 62, December 1962, p. 28
- Shahar Landau, פה הימאים האמיתיים - מפקד נט"ק, "Between Waves" February 1979, p. 5.
- Merv Buschfen, יומם הגדול של הנט"קים - הנחיתה באוואלי, 'Between Waves' Special Issue 1, June 8, 1982, p. 3
- Shlomo Man, סגול כהה - גבעתי בנחיתה, between waves" 169 December 1986, p. 9.
- Yehuda Ben-Zur, פלגת נמ"כים במפרץ אילת מערכת סיני 1956 On the Navy Association (Israel) website, May 2006
- תרגיל נחיתה במפרץ אילת, אוגוסט 1973, Shaul Nagar, website Yad Leshryon, August 22, 2010
- Gideon Raz, האיגוף הימי בקרב היבשה Israeli Institute for National Security Studies Army and Strategy, Volume 3, Issue 1, May 2011
- חיל הים לחטיבה 9', Heads of Chapters for Information to the Commander in the Navy, Chief of Staff Chief Officer Hanoch, Headquarters of the Navy Education, 1966, pp. 22–23.
- Yehuda ben-Zur, כלי הנחיתה במבצע קדש לתמיכה בחטיבה 9, 'Naval Systems' 94, June 1969, p. 23.
- Zvi Singer, "'הנחיתות שהקיפו את אפריקה'", issue 41, June 16, 1976
- Eliezer Tal, "פעולות חיל הים במלחמה הקומוניסטית", Systems Publishing 1964. Second and expanded edition, published by the Navy Association 2002, pp. 60 62.
- David Maguri Cohen, on the operation of the amphibious landings in Eilat during the Six Day War. In his book "צעד אחד קדימה!", published by Efi Meltzer, pp. 77 – 80.
- Raphael Eitan and Dov Goldstein, רפול, סיפורו של חייל, Maariv Publishing. 1985, pp. 205 –302.
- Yorem Yair, אני מלבנון, חטיבת הצנחנים במלחמת 1933, Systems Publishing, 1992, pp. 21–32.
- Dov Rosenthal, Navy Vessel Album, Navy Headquarters Publishing House, 1992.
- Mike Elder, צי 13 סיפורו של הקומנדו הימי Maariv 1993 pp. 607–625.
- Mike Elder, Sheitat 11 - The Battle of the Shalesh, Maariv Library, 1996
