= Operation Raviv =

1969 battle of the War of Attrition

Coordinates: 29°5′58″N 32°39′8″E

- Part of the War of Attrition
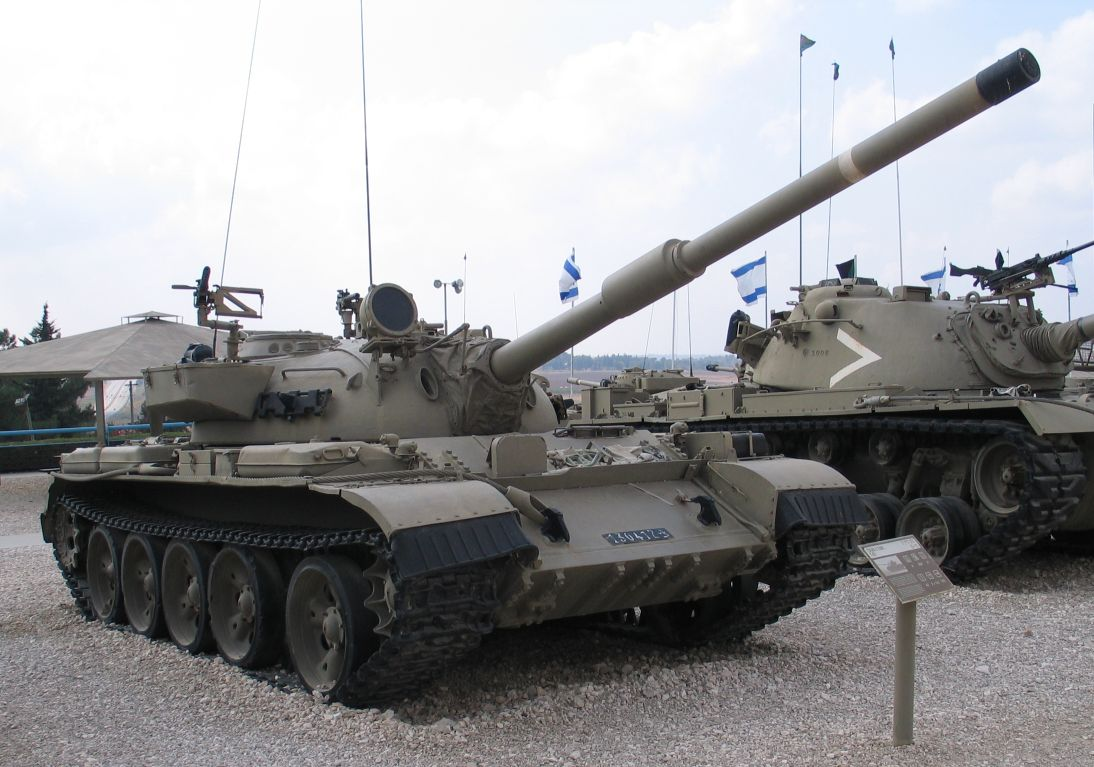
- Israeli Tiran-5 (T-55) at Latrun
Date	September 9, 1969
Location	Egypt's Red Sea coast, southwest of Suez
Result	Israeli victory

Belligerents
Israel	Egypt

Commanders and leaders
Haim Bar Lev; Avraham Adan; Avraham Botzer	Ahmad Ismail Ali

Casualties and losses
3 killed 1 missing	100–200 killed

Operation Raviv (Hebrew: רביב, Drizzle), also known in Egypt as the Zaafarana accident (Arabic: حادثة الزعفرانة) or the Ten-Hour War, was a mounted raid conducted by the Israeli Defence Forces (IDF) on Egypt's Red Sea coast during the War of Attrition. Taking place on September 9, 1969, Raviv was the sole major ground offensive undertaken by the IDF against Egypt throughout the war. The operation saw Israeli forces masquerading as Egyptian troops and using captured Arab armor.

== Background ==
As the War of Attrition raged along the Suez Canal in the summer of 1969, Israel was hard-pressed to find a solution to Egypt's superiority in both manpower and artillery. With Operation Boxer it had begun employing the Israeli Air Force as "flying artillery", yet these operations were under the constant threat of expanding Egyptian air defences. Furthermore, the static nature of the war meant not all of Israel's assets, including its ground forces and their superior mobility, were being put to use. Adopting a policy that has been described as "temporary escalation for the sake of eventual de-escalation", the Israeli government decided to take the fight to the Egyptians, drawing Egyptian forces from the Suez Canal zone while striking a blow against air defences along the exposed Egyptian flank.

== Prelude ==
The planning of Operation Raviv was carried out jointly by the Armored Forces Command under Major General Avraham Adan and the Israel Navy under Rear Admiral Avraham Botzer. A dedicated task force was set up for the raid, composed of troops from various units. It was led by Lieutenant Colonel Baruch "Pinko" Harel, with Major Shlomo Baum as his second in command. The raid was to be carried out by Israeli armor and infantry masquerading as Egyptians. Israeli troops wore Egyptian uniforms and used Arab hardware captured during the Six-Day War which had been introduced into service with the IDF; the force was to use Tiran 5 tanks (IDF designation for the T-55) and BTR-50 armored personnel carriers, camouflaged with the Egyptian sand-coloured scheme.

The tanks were manned by crews from the IDF Armor school and each commanded by an officer. Infantry was provided by the reconnaissance company of the 7th Armored Brigade, augmented by Arabic speaking members of Sayeret Matkal. The crossing of the Gulf of Suez was to be carried out using the landing craft of the navy's Shayetet 11 and was to be secured by Shayetet 13 naval commandos. Assisting the embarkation and disembarkation of the armored force fell to Unit 707, the navy's underwater works unit. After training for six weeks, the force came together at its staging point at Ras Sudar in early September 1969. The armored vehicles arrived at night to avoid detection.

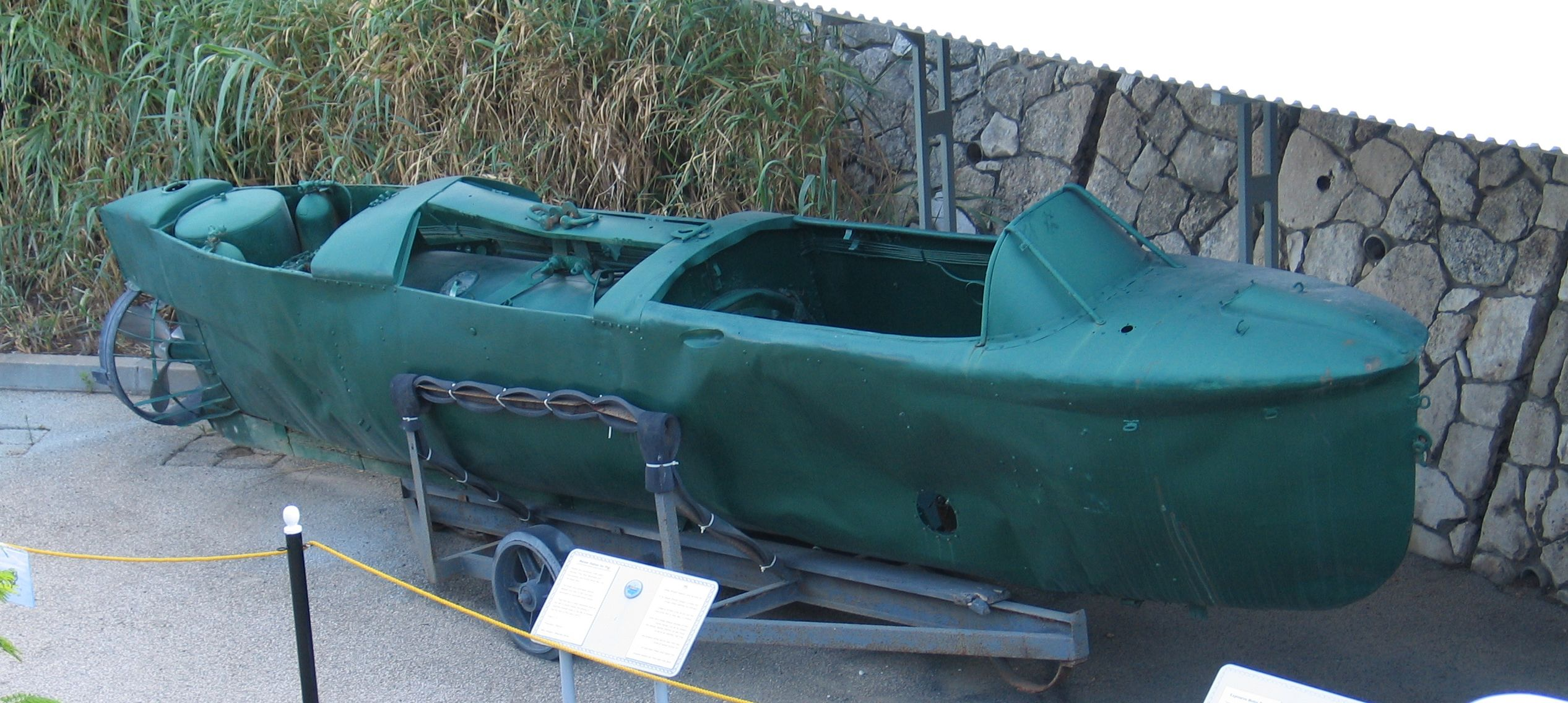
Israel Navy Maiale ("Pig") manned torpedo

On September 7, 1969, Shayetet 13 commandos carried out Operation Escort, raiding the Egyptian Navy anchorage at Ras Sadat. Arriving on a pair of Maiale (Pig) human torpedoes, the eight operators attached limpet mines to two P-183 torpedo boats before withdrawing and detonating their charges from a distance. The sinking of the two boats served a dual purpose, preventing the interception of the Israeli landing craft and their cargo, while drawing Egyptian attention north from the planned point of disembarkation. Despite the operation's successful execution, Shayetet 13 suffered three fatalities when the self-destruct mechanism of one of the Maiales accidentally went off as the commandos were making their way back across the Gulf of Suez.

== Battle ==
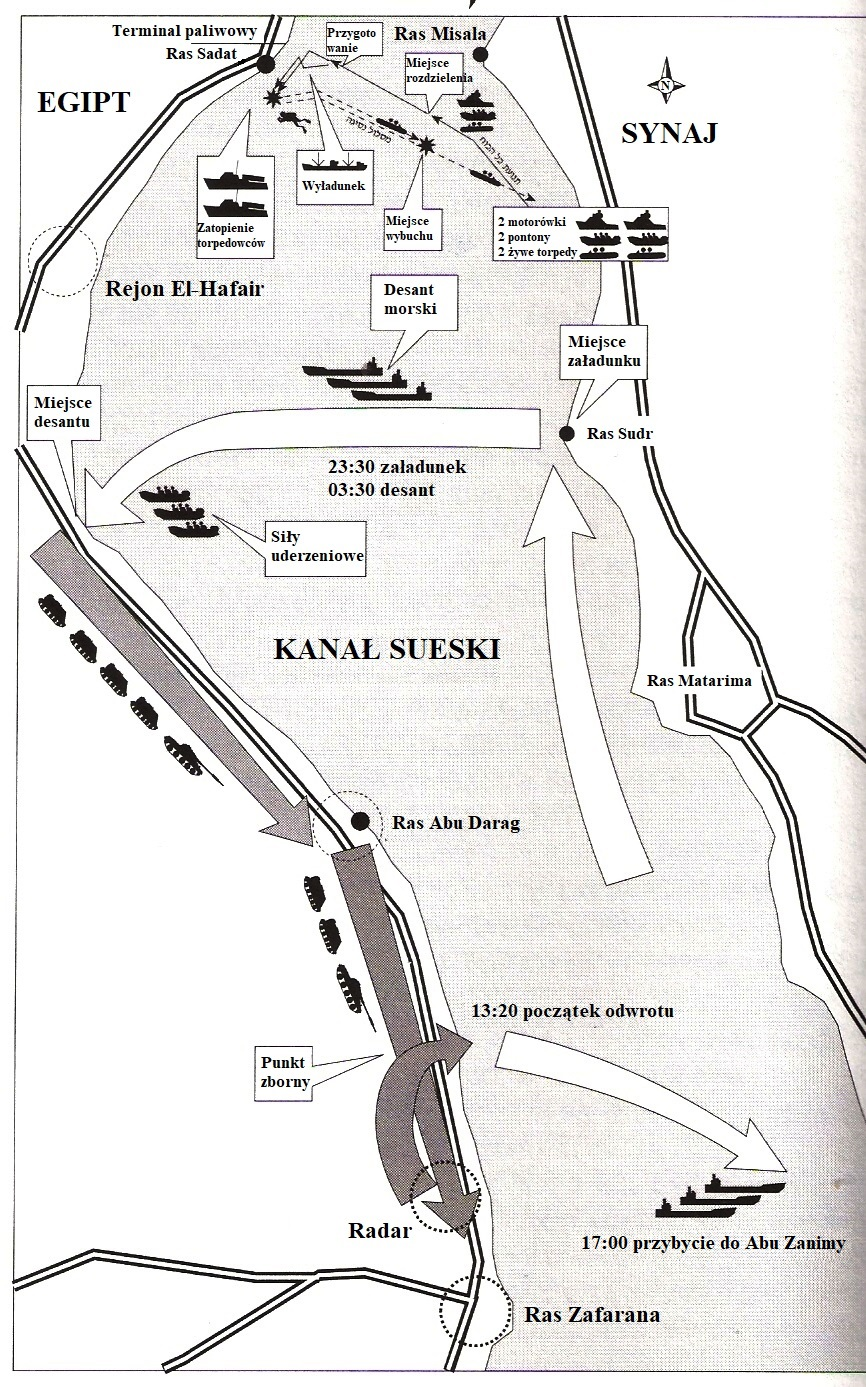
Operation Raviv (in Polish)

"Pinko" Harel's small force of about a hundred men, six Tiran 5s and three BTR-50s, landed on the Egyptian coast at 03:37AM on the morning of September 9. Delivered by three landing craft of Shayetet 11 to a beachhead secured by Shayetet 13, Harel's force landed at El Hafair, 40 kilometres (25 mi) south of Suez and 20 kilometres (12 mi) south of the anchorage at Ras Sadat. Laden with extra fuel and ammunition, the force headed south, wreaking havoc behind Egyptian lines and attacking installations along the way. The first of these was the Egyptian Army camp and radar site at Abu Darag, which by 07:17 had been secured.

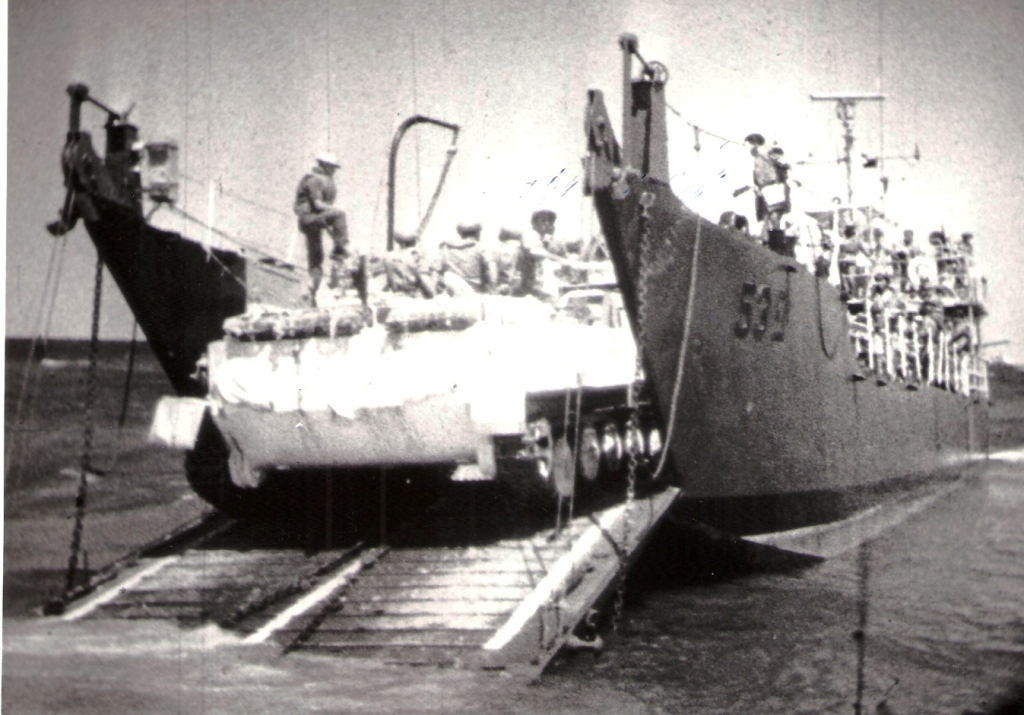
IDF BTR-50 embarking on an Israeli Navy landing craft during Operation Raviv

Masquerading as an Egyptian force, the raiders met no significant resistance and had little trouble overcoming the surprised and lightly armed troops guarding Egyptian installations, ill-equipped to repel enemy tanks. An Egyptian armored force was camped 40 kilometres (25 mi) north of the landing point, but not only were the raiders driving away from it, but also created obstructions to cover their rear. Blowing down rock formations overhanging the road, the force was able to hinder any pursuing force.

Supporting the ground forces were the air force's A-4 Skyhawks, providing continuous aerial cover. Two four-ship formations from 109 Squadron departed Ramat David in the morning, the first tasked with suppressing an SA-2 battery and the second providing close air support to the troops. As Israeli forces were advancing according to plan and meeting little resistance, the latter were directed to attack an Egyptian radar site. The lead Skyhawk, however, was lost in the attack. Flight leader Major Hagai Ronen was last seen hanging beneath his parachute over the Gulf of Suez and is still missing in action. 102 Squadron provided additional close air support.

After the destruction of a radar site at Ras Zafarana, the force came within sight of another Egyptian armored force but was ordered to disengage. After covering 45 km and operating unhindered for over 9 hours in Egyptian territory, the force rendezvoused once again with the 11th Flotilla landing craft. From Ras Zafarana it was ferried back to Israeli-held territory in the Sinai, having suffered a single light injury throughout. The Egyptian Army suffered an estimated 100-200 casualties, including two Soviet military advisors, and had 12 outposts destroyed.

== Aftermath ==
On September 10, shocked and angered by news of the raid, Egyptian president Gamel Abdel Nasser suffered a heart attack. Upon recovery, ten days later, he dismissed the Egyptian Army Chief of Staff, General Ahmad Ismail Ali, the Commander in Chief of the Egyptian Navy, Vice Admiral Fouad Abu Zikry, the commander of Egypt's Red Sea District, as well as a number of other officers.

Having been caught off guard, Egypt had to respond and on September 11 launched a large 102-aircraft raid on Israeli positions in the Sinai. During this action a single MiG-17 was shot down by Israeli air defences, while the Israeli Air Force claimed the destruction of five MiG-21s and two Sukhoi Su-7s for the loss of a single Dassault Mirage. Its pilot, Giora Romm, was taken prisoner. Egypt claimed the destruction of three Israeli aircraft.
