= Sea-based X-band radar =

Part of US ballistic missile defense system

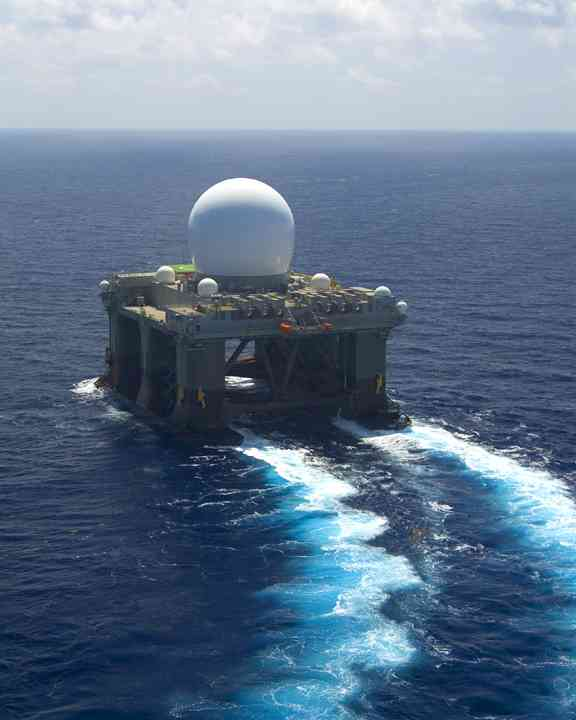
The Sea-Based X-Band Radar underway

The Sea-Based X-band radar (SBX-1) is a floating, self-propelled, mobile active electronically scanned array early-warning radar station designed to operate in high winds and heavy seas. It was developed as part of the United States Department of Defense Missile Defense Agency's (MDA) Ballistic Missile Defense System, and first deployed in 2006.

The radar is mounted on a fifth-generation CS-50 twin-hulled semi-submersible oil platform. Conversion of the vessel was carried out at the AmFELS yard in Brownsville, Texas; the radar mount was built and mounted on the vessel at the Kiewit yard in Ingleside, Texas. It is nominally based at Adak Island in Alaska but has spent significant time at Pearl Harbor in test status.

== Specifications ==
- Vessel length: 389 feet (119 m)
- Vessel beam: 238 feet (73 m)
- Vessel height: 279 feet (85 m) from keel to top of radome
- Vessel draft: approximately 33 feet (10 m) when in motion or not on station; approximately 98 feet (30 m) when on station
- Vessel stability: remains within 10 degrees of horizontal on station (fully passive stabilization)
- Vessel speed: 9 knots (17 km/h; 10 mph)
- Cost: US$900 million
- Crew: Approximately 75-85 members, mostly civilian contractors
- Radar height: 103 feet (31 m)
- Radar diameter: 120 feet (37 m)
- Radar weight: 18,000 pounds (8,200 kg)
- Radar range: 1,200 miles (2,000 km)
- Displacement: 50,000 short tons (45,000,000 kg)

== Details ==
SBX-1 is part of the Ground-Based Midcourse Defense (GMD) system under development by the Missile Defense Agency (MDA). The decision to place the system on a mobile sea-based platform was intended to allow the vessel to be moved to areas needed for enhanced missile defense. Fixed radars provide coverage for a minimal area due to the curvature of the Earth. Even though the same limitation applies to the SBX, its moving ability mitigates it. SBX's primary task is to discriminate enemy warheads from decoys, followed by precision tracking the identified warheads. Testing has raised doubts about the system's ability to perform these tasks, deal with multiple targets, and report accurately to command authorities.

The vessel has many small radomes for various communications tasks and a large central dome that encloses a phased-array, 1,800-tonne (4,000,000 lb) X-band radar antenna. The small radomes are rigid, but the central dome is not - the flexible cover is supported by positive air pressure amounting to a few inches of water. The amount of air pressure is variable depending on weather conditions.

The radar antenna is 384 m^{2} (4,130 sq ft). It has 45,000 solid-state transmit-receive modules mounted on an octagonal flat base, which can move ±270 degrees in azimuth and 0 to 85 degrees elevation (although software currently limits the maximum physical elevation to 80 degrees). The maximum azimuth and elevation velocities are approximately 5–8 degrees per second. In addition to the physical motion of the base, the beam can be electronically steered off bore-sight (details classified).

There are currently 22,000 modules installed on the base. Each module has one transmit-receive feed horn, and one auxiliary receive feed horn for a second polarization, totaling 44,000 feed horns. The base is roughly 2/3 populated, with space for the installation of additional modules. The current modules are concentrated toward the center to minimize grating lobes. This configuration allows it to support the very-long-range target discrimination and tracking that GMD's midcourse segment requires. The radar never points at land for the safety of the inhabitants.

In addition to the power consumed by the radar, the thrusters that propel the vessel are electric and require substantial power. The maximum speed is approximately 8 knots (9.2 mph; 15 km/h). The vessel has six 3.6-megawatt generators (12-cylinder Caterpillar diesel) to support this and all other electrical equipment. The generators are in two compartments, one port and one starboard.

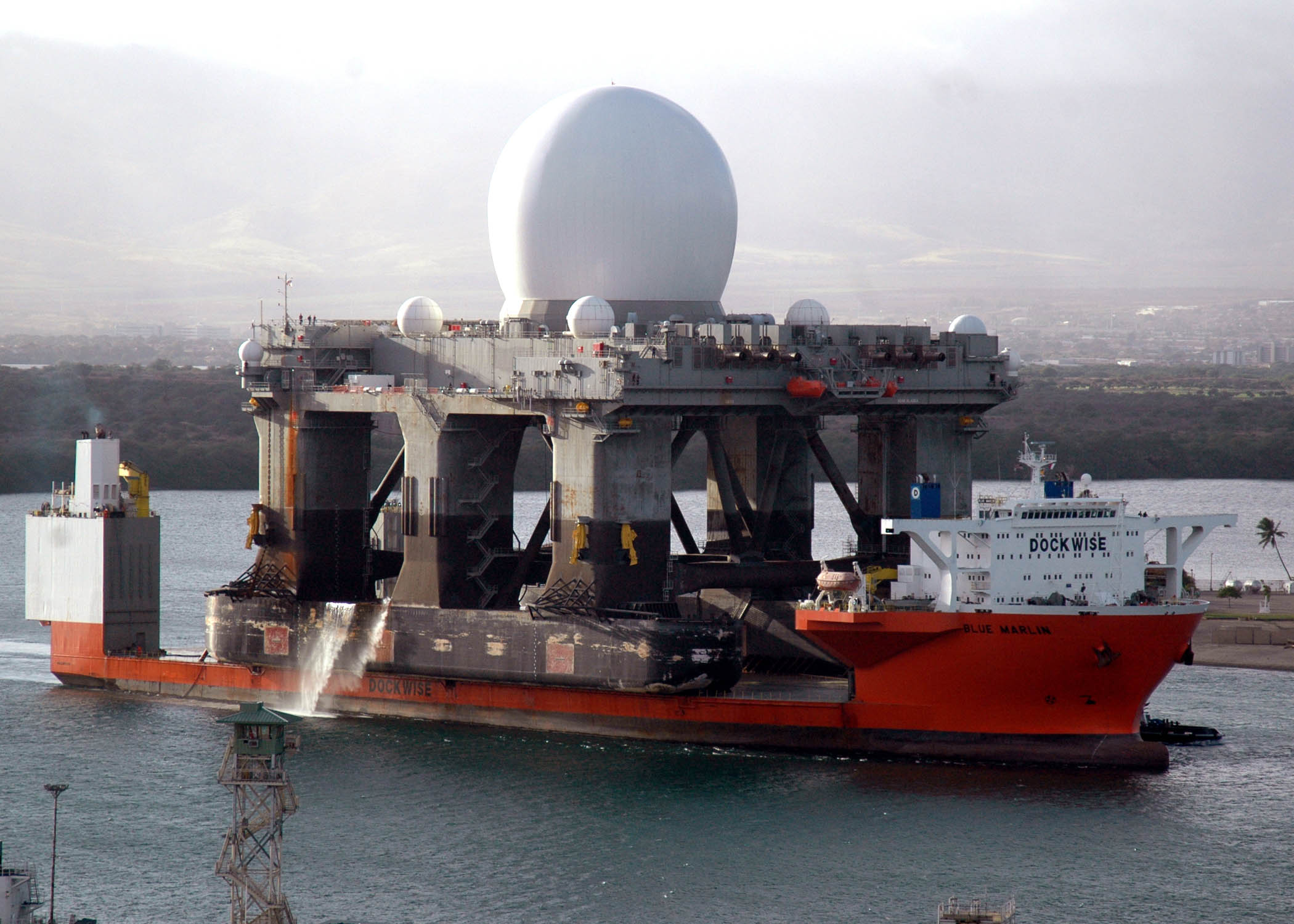
SBX entering Pearl Harbor, Hawaii for repairs on 9 January 2006

The radar is derived from the radar used in the THAAD theater ballistic missile defense system. It is a part of the layered ballistic missile defense system (BMDS) program of the United States Missile Defense Agency (MDA). One important difference from Aegis is using the X band in the SBX. Aegis uses S band, and Patriot uses the higher-frequency C band. The X band frequency is higher still, so its shorter wavelength enables finer resolution of tracked objects.

The radar was described by Lt. Gen Trey Obering (former director of MDA) as being able to track an object the size of a baseball over San Francisco in California from Chesapeake Bay in Virginia, approximately 2,900 miles (4,700 km) away. The radar will guide land-based missiles from Alaska and California, as well as in-theater assets, depending on the mission.

The vessel is classed by ABS and has the IMO number of 8765412.

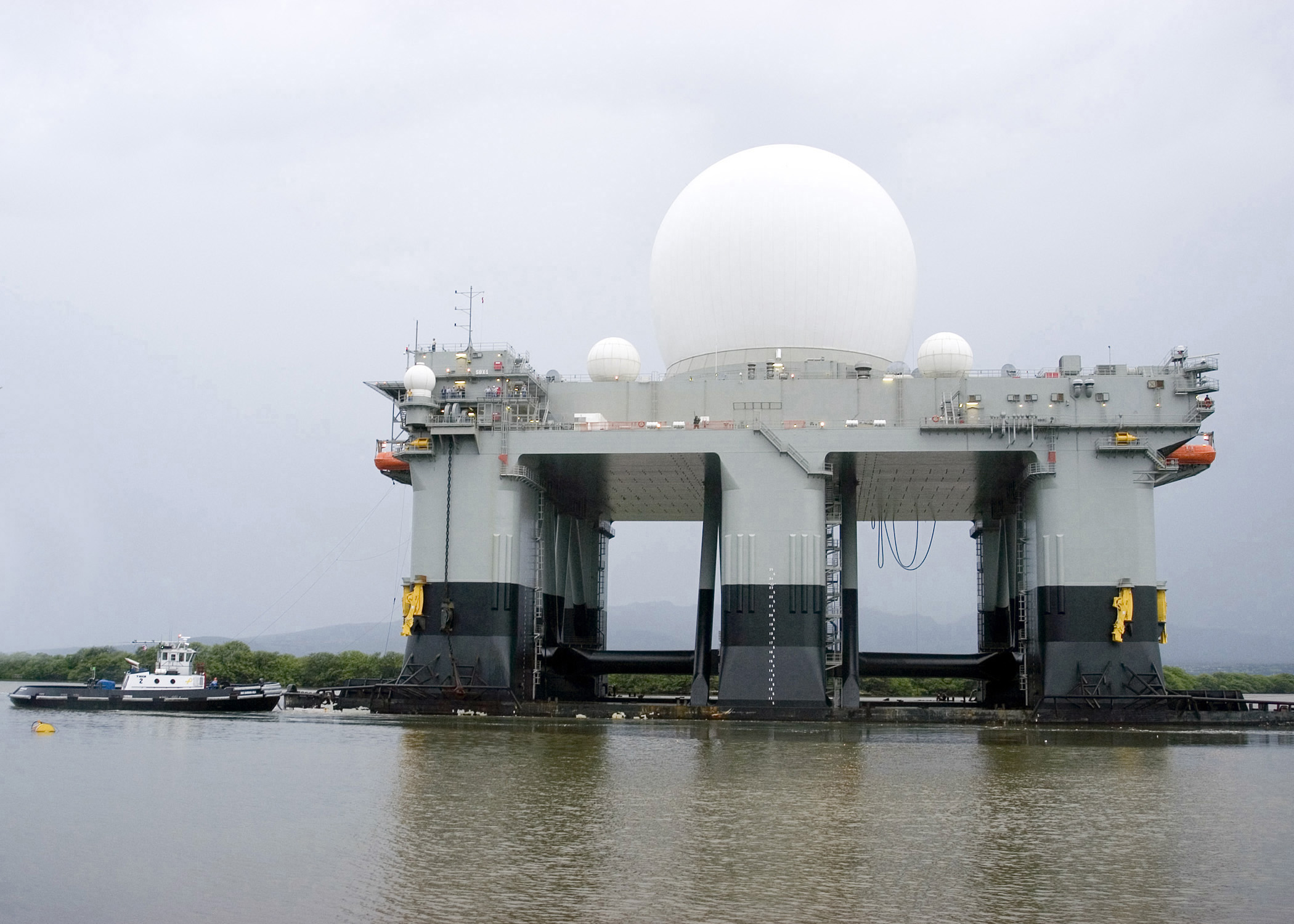
SBX departing Pearl Harbor, Hawaii on 31 March 2006

The first such vessel is scheduled to be based in Adak Island, Alaska, part of the Aleutian Islands. From that location, it will be able to track missiles launched toward the US from both North Korea and China. Although her homeport is in Alaska, she will be tasked with moving throughout the Pacific Ocean to support her mission. The hull code number given to the SBX vessel, "SBX-1", indicates the possibility of further units of the class. When a vessel must be continually on duty over a long period, common naval practice is to have at least three units of the type available to allow for replenishment, repair, and overhaul. Three further CS-50/Moss Sirius design vessels were under construction or contract at the Severodvinsk Shipyard in Russia as of early 2007 but were configured for oil production. On 11 May 2011, Col. Mark Arn, the SBX project manager for MDA, said that the "SBX is the only one of its kind and there are no current plans for another one". In July 2011, a Missile Defense Agency spokesman explained that other, smaller radars in the Pacific will "pick up the slack" while SBX is in port with its radar turned off.

== Operational history ==
The SBX was deployed in 2006. The ship has spent time for maintenance and repair at Pearl Harbor, Hawaii, several times, including 170 days in 2006, 63 days in 2007, 63 days in 2008, 177 days in 2009, and 51 days in 2010. When not in Hawaii, the SBX has been on operational deployments in the Pacific, including the waters off Alaska. The ship has not moored in Alaska, despite the construction of an eight-point, $26 million mooring chain system installed in 2007 in Adak's Kuluk Bay. On 23 June 2009, the SBX was moved to offshore Hawaii in response to a potential North Korean missile launch. Between 2009 and 2010, the vessel spent 396 continuous days at sea.

The SBX failed during a flight test on 31 January 2010, designated FTG-06. The test was a simulation of a North Korean or Iranian missile launch. The test failure arose from two factors, the first being that algorithms in the SBX radar software (designed to filter out extraneous information from the target scene) were left disengaged for the test, and the second was a mechanical failure in a thruster on the kill vehicle.

During flight test FTG-06a on 15 December 2010, the SBX performed as expected, but the target missile was again not intercepted.

In May 2011, the SBX-1 entered Vigor Shipyards (formerly the Todd Pacific Shipyard) in Seattle for a $27 million upgrade and maintenance work by contractor Boeing. The work was completed in about three months and in August 2011, SBX-1 departed Seattle for deployment.

In December 2011, MDA transferred responsibility for the SBX vessel management and physical security to the U.S. Navy's Military Sealift Command. MDA retains responsibility for communications, the X-band Radar, and for mission integration.

In February 2012, the Missile Defense Agency requested only $9.7 million per year for Fiscal Years 2013 through 2017, down from $176.8 million in fiscal 2012. This reduced amount would be used to maintain SBX in a "limited test support" role "while also retaining the ability to recall it to an active, operational status if and when it is needed."

In April 2012, it was reported that SBX-1 had left Pearl Harbor and was assumed to be being deployed to monitor North Korea's planned Unha-3 missile in the launch window of 12–16 April 2012. The vessel returned to Pearl Harbor on 21 May 2012. It redeployed to monitor the next North Korean launch attempt at the end of 2012.

In April 2013, it was reported that SBX-1 was being deployed to monitor North Korea. It has never been deployed to Adak.

In November 2015, it was moved to Pearl Harbor for repairs and testing. It departed Pearl Harbor in November 2017 for North Pacific Ocean waters to monitor North Korea's ballistic missile operations.

In January 2017, the SBX-1 was deployed into the Pacific during North Korean threats of ICBM and nuclear attacks on other nations. The radar was able to perform its mission of tracking a target operating at ICBM speeds during the interception of a mock ICBM by a GMD interceptor on 30 May 2017.

In May 2019, the SBX-1 docked on the north side of Ford Island in Pearl Harbor, where it underwent maintenance. It departed Pearl Harbor on 26 September 2019.

== Gallery ==
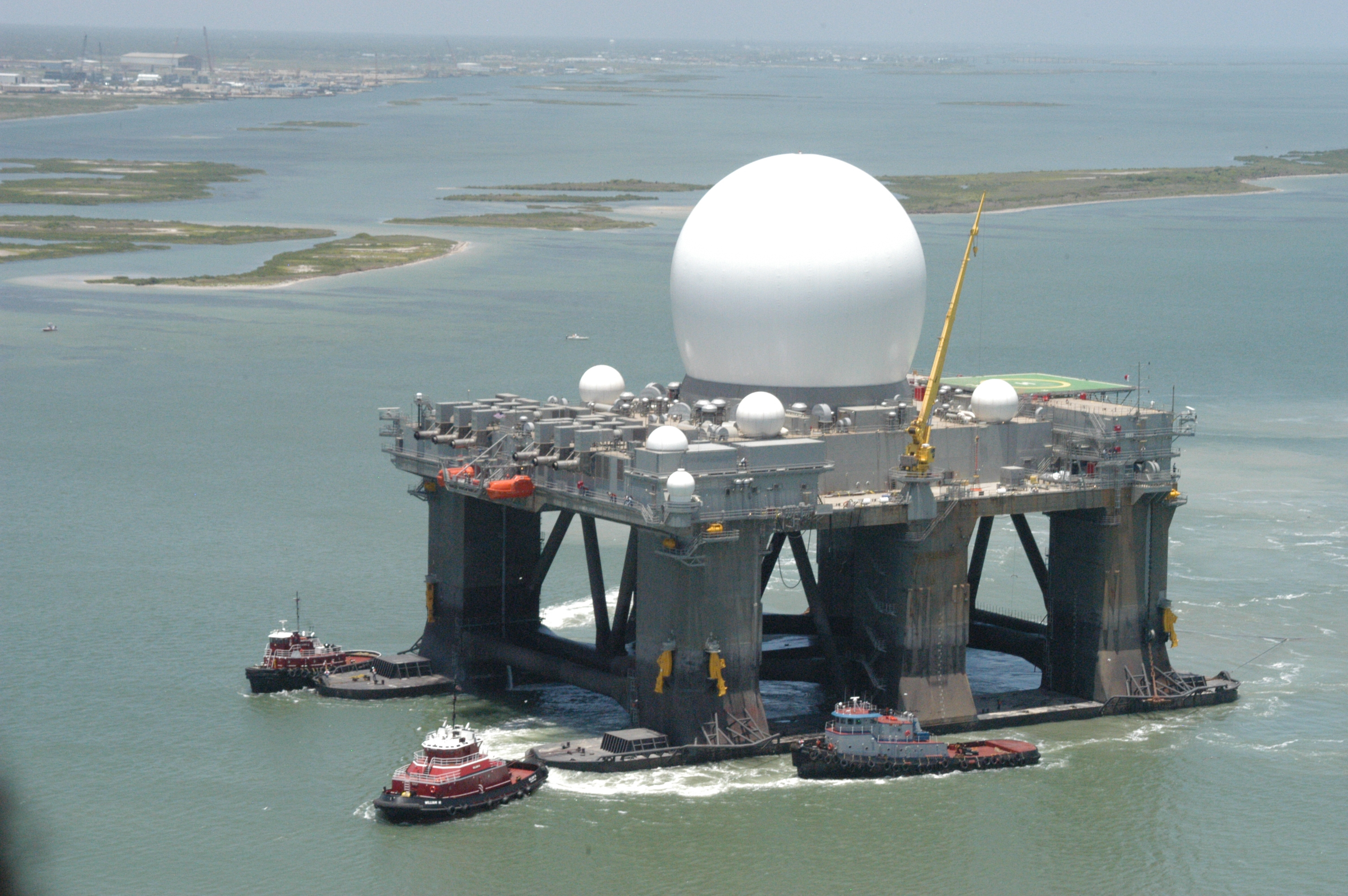

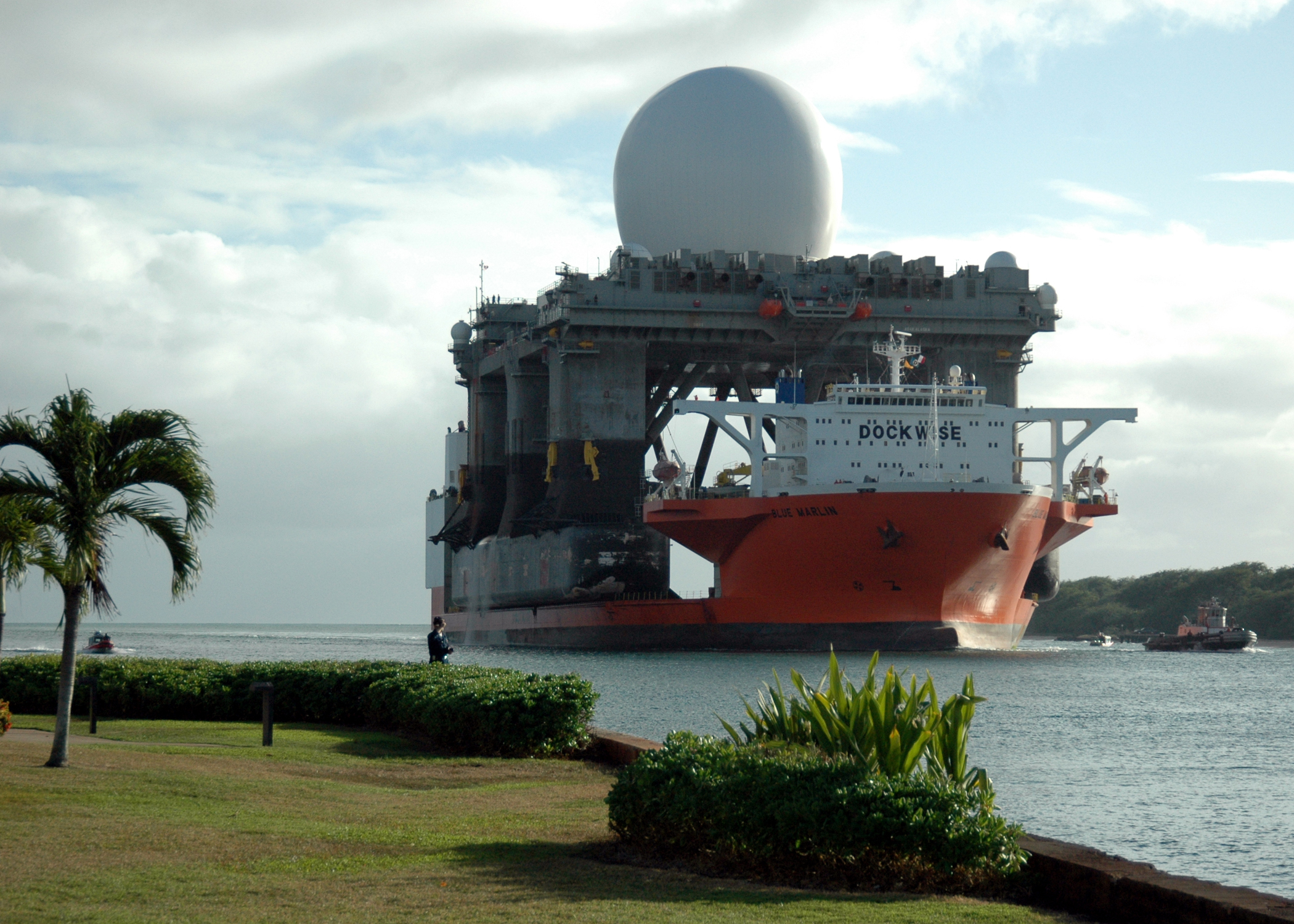
The platform entering Pearl Harbor on the MV Blue Marlin

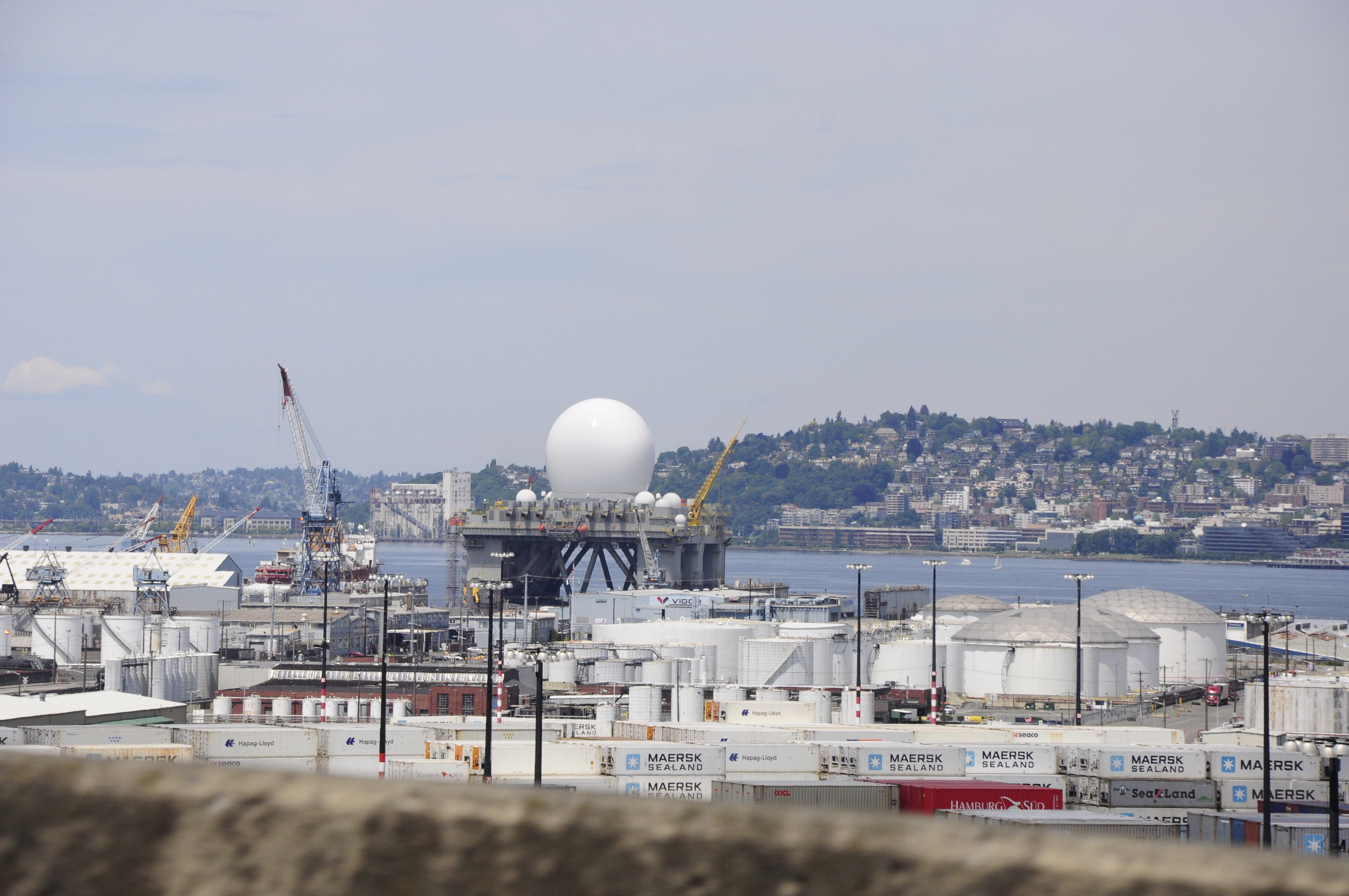
The vessel at Vigor Shipyards in Seattle

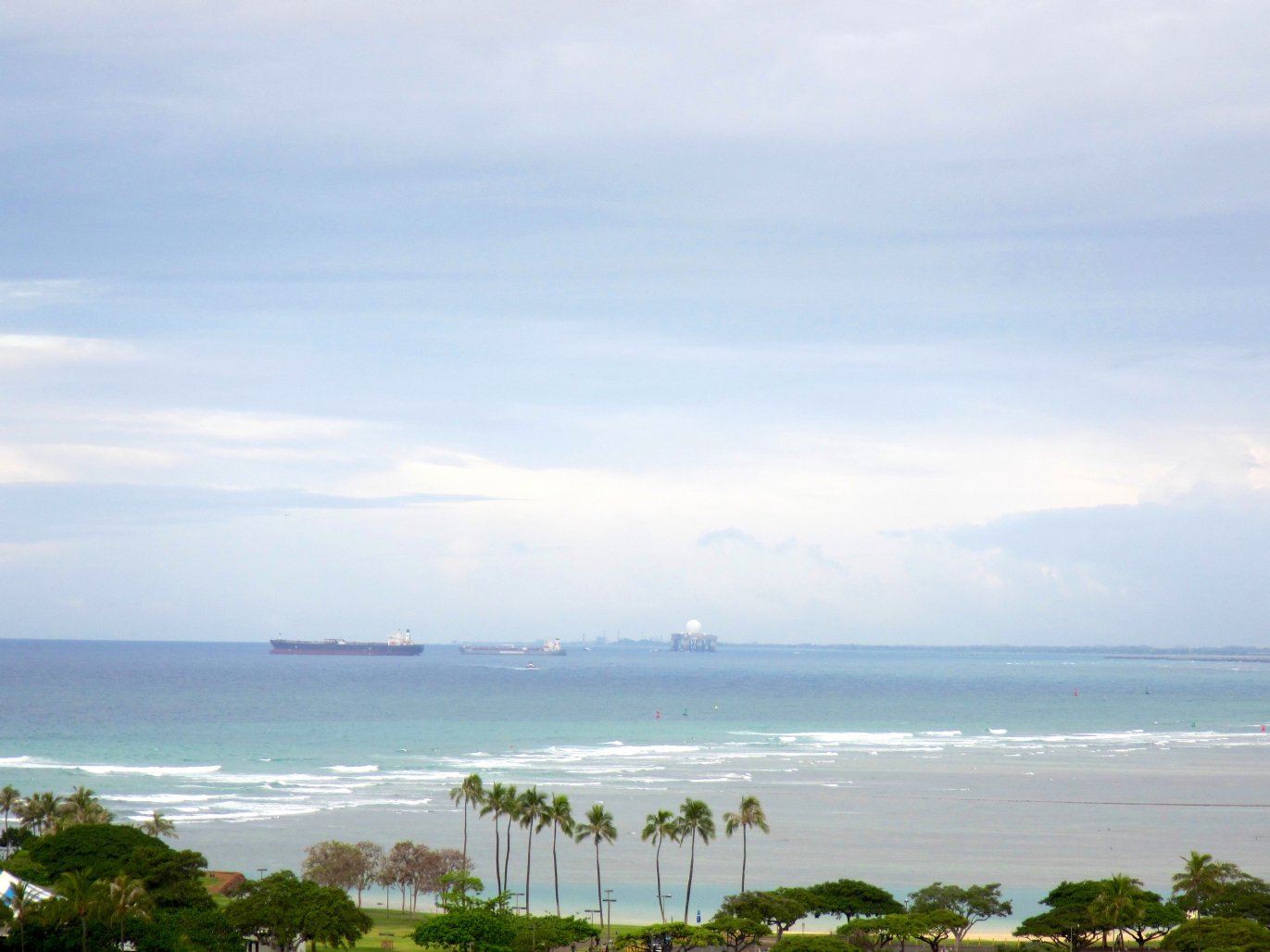
SBX-1 leaving Pearl Harbor on 22 March 2013

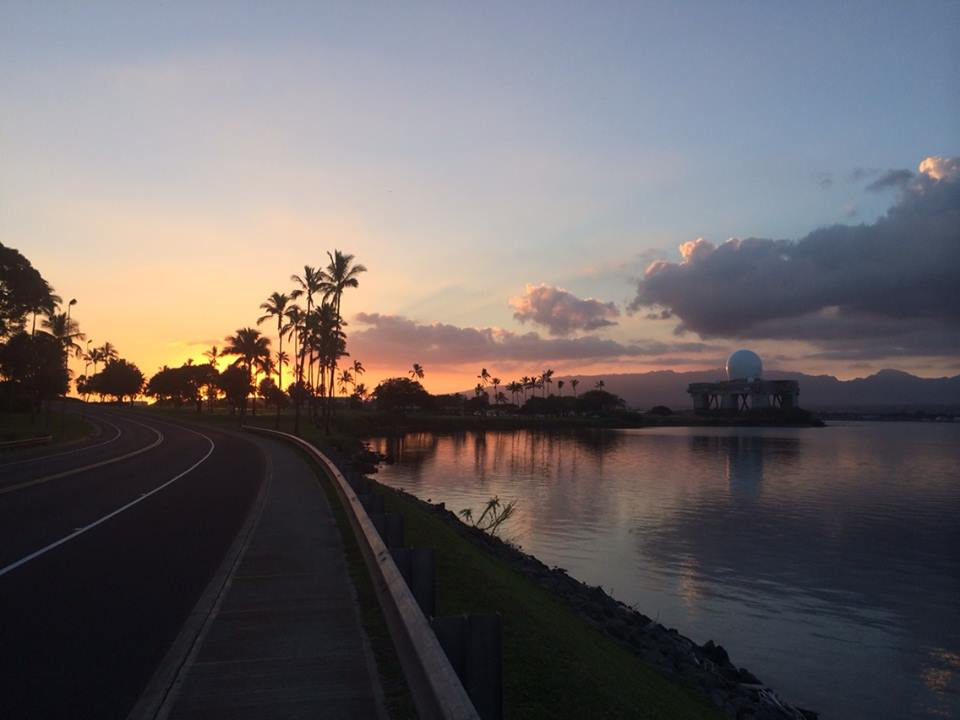
SBX-1 stationed at Ford Island

== In popular culture ==
A fictionalized version of SBX-1, armed with "Interceptor" anti-ballistic missiles, is used as the setting for the 2022 action drama film Interceptor.

The SBX-1 has become known to locals of Oahu as the "Golf Ball" or the "Pearl of Pearl Harbor" due to its color and shape.

An SBX-1 was credited with detecting an unidentified missile launch in the 2025 film A House of Dynamite.

== See also ==
- Texas Towers, similar structures from the Cold War era for aircraft detection
- USNS Observation Island (T-AGM-23), similar observation stations
- USNS Invincible (T-AGM-24), similar radar
- USNS Howard O. Lorenzen (T-AGM-25), similar observation stations
