= Lester Lyles =

US Air Force general

Lester L. Lyles
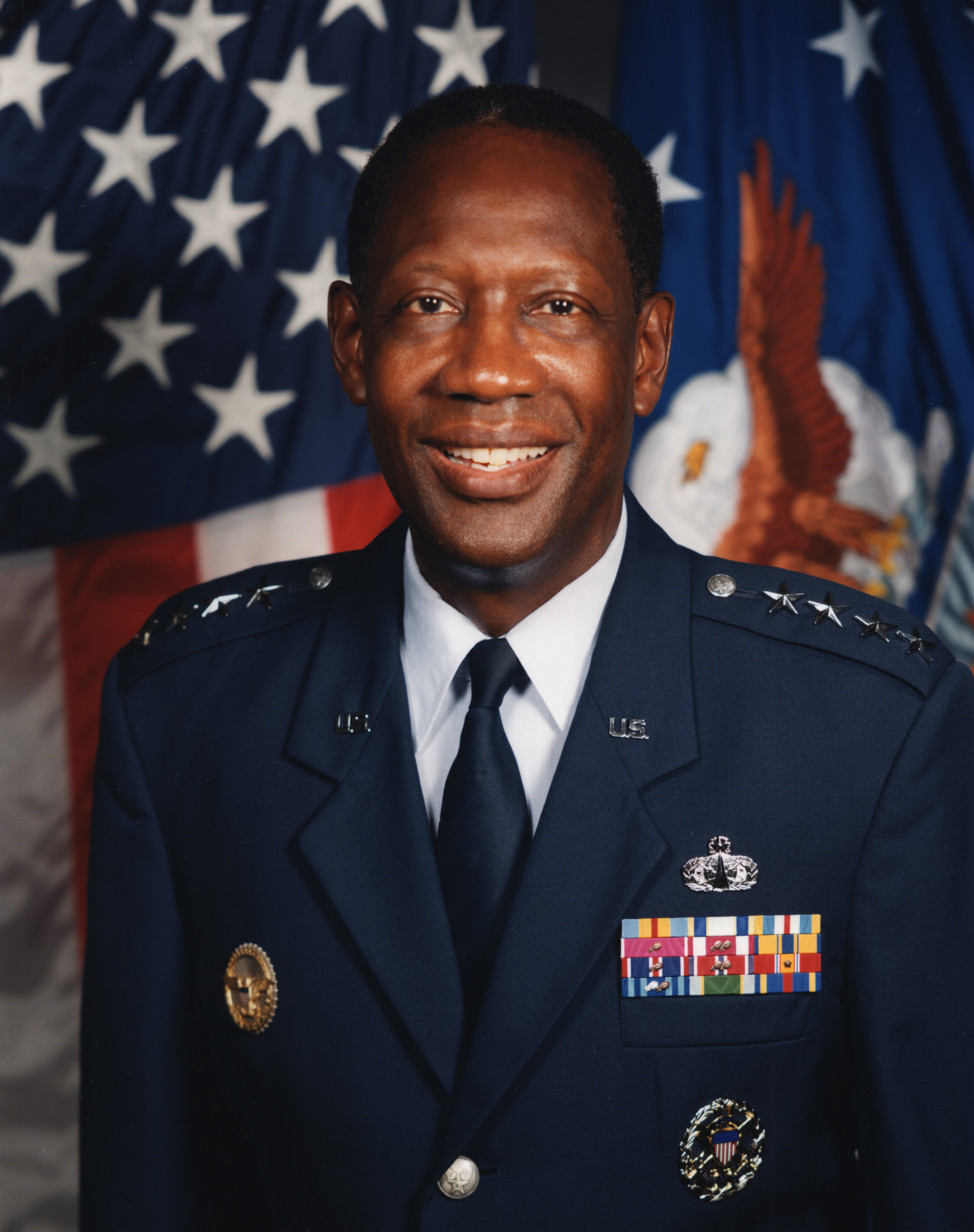
- General Lester Lyles
- Born: April 20, 1946 (age 80); Washington, D.C., U.S.
- Military career
- Branch: United States Air Force
- Service years: 1968–2003
- Rank: General
- Commands: Vice Chief of Staff of the United States Air Force, Air Force Materiel Command, Ballistic Missile Defense Organization
- Awards: Defense Distinguished Service Medal; Air Force Distinguished Service Medal; Defense Superior Service Medal; Legion of Merit (2)
- Other work: Chairman of USAA, director, General Dynamics, DPL Inc., KBR Incorporated, Precision Castparts Corp.

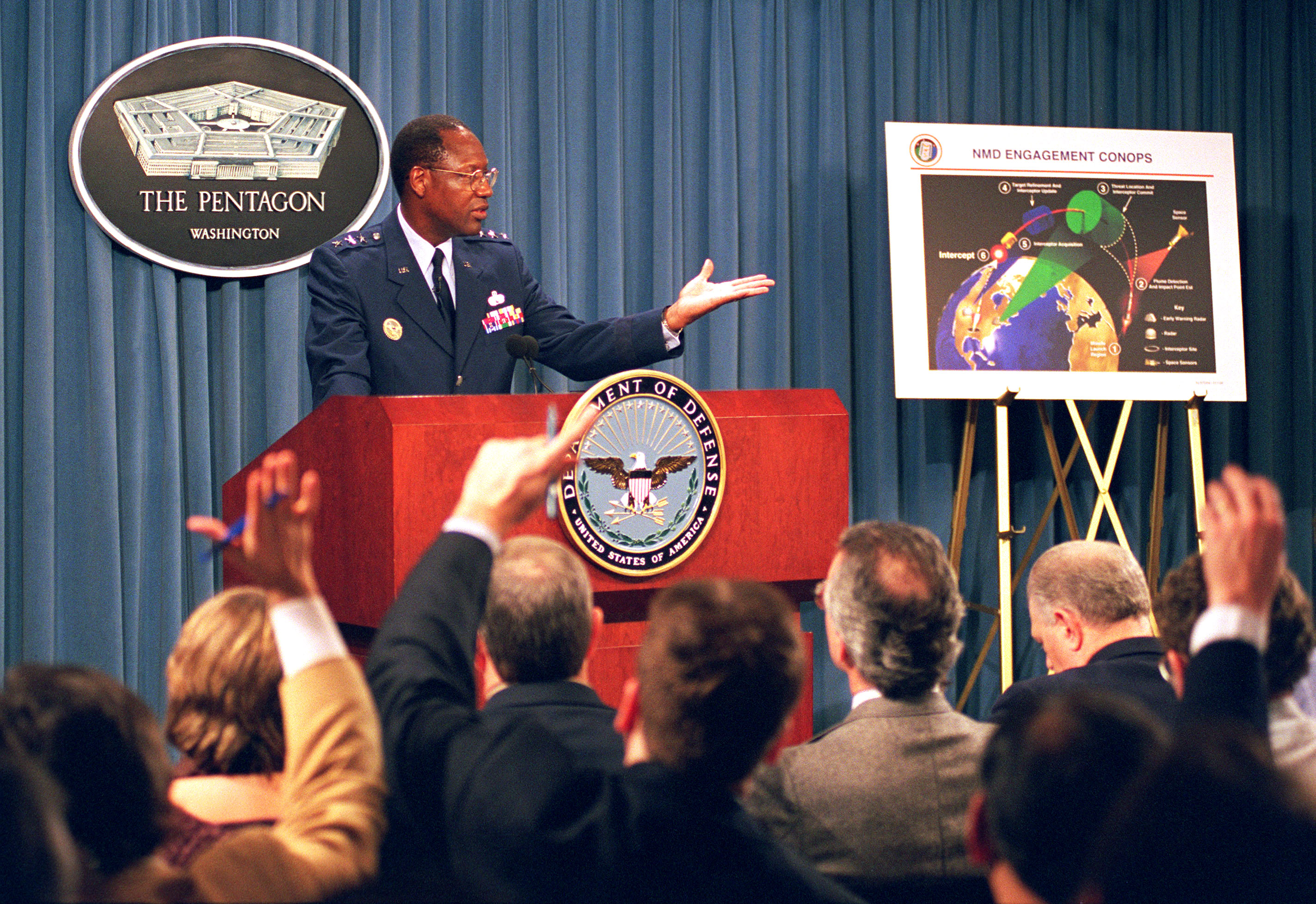
Air Force Lt. Gen. Lester L. Lyles, director of the Ballistic Missile Defense Organization, briefs reporters at the Pentagon, Jan. 20, 1999, on the latest developments in hardware, operational concepts, and political/diplomatic considerations relating to missile defense

General Lester L. Lyles (born April 20, 1946) is a retired four-star general in the United States Air Force (USAF). He served as Vice Chief of Staff of the United States Air Force, and Commander, Air Force Materiel Command, Wright-Patterson Air Force Base, Ohio. After retirement from the USAF in 2003, he became a company director for General Dynamics, DPL Inc., KBR, Inc., Precision Castparts Corp., MTC Technologies, Battelle Memorial Institute and USAA. Lyles is also a trustee of Analytic Services and a managing partner of Four Seasons Ventures, LLC.

== Biography ==
Lyles entered the USAF in 1968 as a distinguished graduate of the Air Force ROTC program. He served in various assignments, including Program Element Monitor of the Short-Range Attack Missile at USAF Headquarters in 1974, and as special assistant and aide-de-camp to the commander of Air Force Systems Command (AFSC) in 1978. In 1981 he was assigned to Wright-Patterson AFB as avionics division chief in the F-16 Systems Program Office. He has served as director of tactical aircraft systems at AFSC headquarters and as director of the Medium-Launch Vehicles Program and Space-Launch Systems offices.

Lyles became AFSC headquarters' assistant deputy chief of staff for requirements in 1989, and deputy chief of staff for requirements in 1990. In 1992 he became vice commander of Ogden Air Logistics Center, Hill AFB, Utah. He served as Commander of the center from 1993 until 1994, then was assigned to command the Space and Missile Systems Center at Los Angeles AFB, Calif., until 1996. Lyles became the director of the Ballistic Missile Defense Organization in 1996. In May 1999, he was assigned as vice chief of staff at Headquarters U.S. Air Force. He assumed command of Air Force Materiel Command in April 2000. Lyles retired from the air force on October 1, 2003.

Lyles was a member of The President's Commission on U.S. Space Policy. He chairs the "Rationale and Goals of the U.S. Civil Space Program" committee of the United States National Academies. In May 2009 he was named a member Review of United States Human Space Flight Plans Committee, an independent review requested by the Office of Science and Technology Policy. The same year he was appointed to the Defense Science Board, a committee of civilian experts appointed to advise the U.S. Department of Defense on scientific and technical matters. As of December 2013, he continues to serve as its vice chairman. In December 2009, General Lyles was appointed to the President's Intelligence Advisory Board by the White House.

On January 22, 2013, General Lyles was named chairman of the board of directors for USAA having been a USAA member since 1968 and a member of the board of directors since 2004. General Lyles completed his final term as chairman in August 2019 after nearly seven years in the role and left USAA's board of directors after 15 years of dedicated service.

On May 15, 2019, General Lyles assumed the role of non-executive chairman of the board for KBR, Inc. having been a member of the board of directors since November 2007.

== Personal ==
In the 2024 United States presidential election, Lyles endorsed Kamala Harris.

== Education ==
- 1968 Bachelor of Science degree in mechanical engineering, Howard University, Washington, D.C.
- 1969 Master of Science degree in mechanical and nuclear engineering, Air Force Institute of Technology Program, New Mexico State University, Las Cruces
- 1980 Defense Systems Management College, Fort Belvoir, Virginia
- 1981 Armed Forces Staff College, Norfolk, Virginia
- 1985 National War College, Fort Lesley J. McNair, Washington, D.C.
- 1991 National and International Security Management Course, Harvard University, Cambridge, Massachusetts

== Assignments ==
- February 1969 - November 1971, propulsion and structures engineer, Standard Space-Launch Vehicles Program Office, Los Angeles Air Force Station, California
- November 1971 - July 1974, propulsion engineer, Headquarters Aeronautical Systems Division, Wright-Patterson AFB, Ohio
- July 1974 - April 1975, program element monitor for the short-range attack missile, Headquarters U.S. Air Force, Washington, D.C.
- April 1975 - March 1978, executive officer to the deputy chief of staff for research and development, Headquarters U.S. Air Force, Washington, D.C.
- March 1978 - January 1980, special assistant and aide-de-camp to the commander, Headquarters AFSC, Andrews AFB, Maryland
- January 1980 - June 1980, Defense Systems Management College, Fort Belvoir, Virginia
- June 1980 - January 1981, Armed Forces Staff College, Norfolk, Virginia
- January 1981 - June 1981, chief, Avionics Division, F-16 Systems Program Office, Headquarters Aeronautical Systems Division, Wright-Patterson AFB, Ohio
- June 1981 - July 1984, deputy director for special and advanced projects, F-16 Systems Program Office, Headquarters Aeronautical Systems Division, Wright-Patterson AFB, Ohio
- August 1984 - June 1985, student, National War College, Fort Lesley J. McNair, Washington, D.C.
- June 1985 - June 1987, director of tactical aircraft systems, Headquarters AFSC, Andrews AFB, Maryland
- June 1987 - April 1988, director, Medium-Launch Vehicles Program Office, Headquarters Space Systems Division, Los Angeles AFS, California
- April 1988 - August 1989, assistant deputy commander for launch systems, Headquarters Space Systems Division, Los Angeles AFS, California
- August 1989 - July 1992, assistant deputy chief of staff for requirements, then deputy chief of staff for requirements, Headquarters AFSC, Andrews AFB, Maryland
- July 1992 - November 1994, vice commander, then commander, Ogden Air Logistics Center, Hill AFB, Utah
- November 1994 - August 1996, commander, Space and Missile Systems Center, Los Angeles AFB, California
- August 1996 - May 1999, director, Ballistic Missile Defense Organization, Department of Defense, Washington, D.C.
- May 1999 - April 2000, Vice Chief of Staff of the United States Air Force, Headquarters U.S. Air Force, Washington, D.C.
- April 2000 - October 2003, commander, United States Air Force Materiel Command, Wright-Patterson AFB, Ohio

== Awards and decorations ==
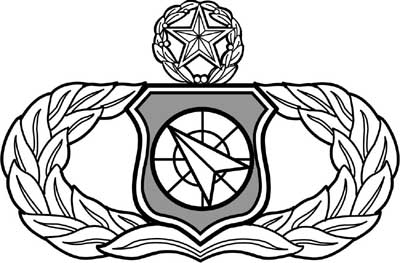
| Command Space and Missile Operations Badge |
| Office of the Joint Chiefs of Staff Identification Badge |
| Office of the Secretary of Defense Identification Badge |

| Defense Distinguished Service Medal |
| Air Force Distinguished Service Medal |
| Defense Superior Service Medal |
| Legion of Merit with one bronze oak leaf cluster |
| Meritorious Service Medal with two bronze oak leaf clusters |
| Air Force Commendation Medal |
| Air Force Outstanding Unit Award with one oak leaf cluster |
| Air Force Organizational Excellence Award with two oak leaf clusters |
| NASA Distinguished Public Service Medal |
| National Defense Service Medal with two bronze service stars |
| Air Force Longevity Service Award with one silver and two bronze oak leaf clusters |
| Small Arms Expert Marksmanship Ribbon |
| Air Force Training Ribbon |

== Other achievements ==
- 1990 Astronautics Engineer of the Year, National Space Club
- 1994 Roy Wilkins Renown Service Award for outstanding contributions to military equal opportunity policies and programs, National Association for the Advancement of Colored People
- 1999 Sociedad de Ingenieros Award, New Mexico State University
- 1999 Hiram Hadley Founder's Award of Excellence, New Mexico State University
- 2000 Gen. Bernard A. Schriever Award
- 2003 Honorary Doctor of Laws from New Mexico State University
- 2012 Thomas D. White Award from the United States Air Force Academy

== Effective dates of promotion ==
| Insignia | Rank | Date |
|---|---|---|
| | General | July 1, 1999 |
| | Lieutenant general | November 16, 1994 |
| | Major general | August 6, 1993 |
| | Brigadier general | May 1, 1991 |
| | Colonel | December 1, 1985 |
| | Lieutenant colonel | December 1, 1982 |
| | Major | November 1, 1979 |
| | Captain | February 2, 1971 |
| | First lieutenant | August 2, 1969 |
| | Second lieutenant | February 2, 1968 |

Military offices
| Preceded by Garry A. Schnelzer | Commander, Space and Missile Systems Center; 1994 - 1996 | Succeeded by Ronald T. Kadish |
| Preceded by Malcolm Ross O'Neill | Director of the Ballistic Missile Defense Organization; 1996 - 1999 | Succeeded by Ronald T. Kadish |
| Preceded by Ralph Eberhart | Vice Chief of Staff of the United States Air Force; 1999 - 2000 | Succeeded by John W. Handy |
| Preceded by George T. Babbitt, Jr. | Commander, Air Force Materiel Command; 2000 - 2003 | Succeeded by Gregory S. Martin |
