= Multiple Kill Vehicle =

U.S. missile defense program

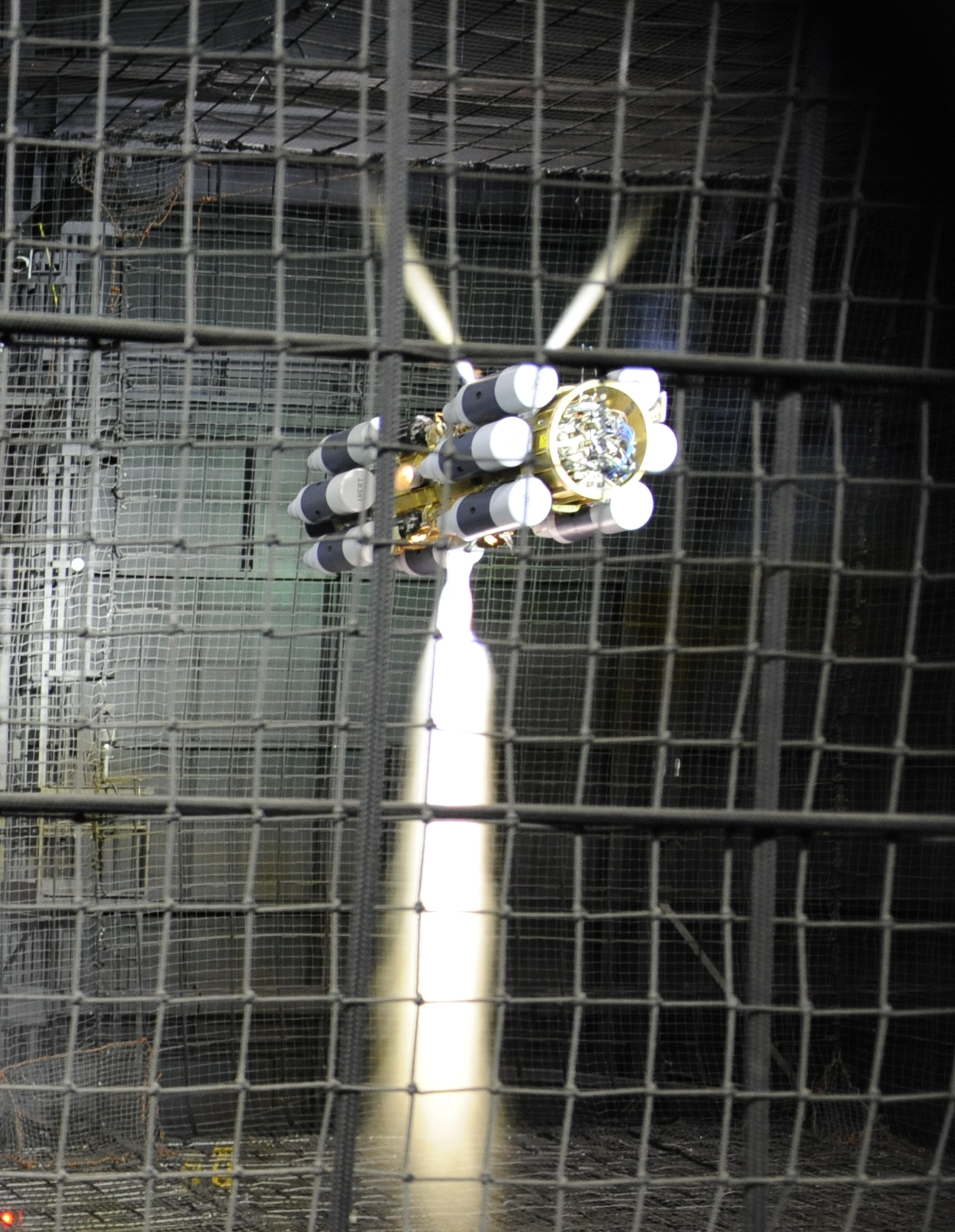
Test of MKV-L

The Multiple Kill Vehicle (MKV) was a planned U.S. missile defense program whose goal was to design, develop, and deploy multiple small kinetic energy-based warheads that can intercept and destroy multiple ballistic missiles, including possible decoy targets (penetration aids).

The MKV concept provided the capability for more than one kill vehicle to be launched from a single booster. The system included a carrier vehicle with on-board sensors and a number of kill vehicles, each equipped with its own navigation thrusters and weighing around 10 pounds (4.5 kg). With multiple kill vehicles on a single target "cloud" the probability for a hit on the actual warhead is enhanced. The capability of the system to intercept multiple independent targets was also planned to be tested.

The MKV mission was to destroy medium-range through intercontinental-range ballistic missiles equipped with multiple warheads or countermeasures by using a single interceptor missile. During an actual hostile ballistic missile attack, the carrier vehicle with its cargo of small kill vehicles would have maneuvered into the path of an enemy missile. Using tracking data from the Ballistic Missile Defense System and its own seeker, the carrier vehicle would have dispensed and guided the kill vehicles to destroy any warheads or countermeasures.

After successful development, MKV was planned to be deployed on board Ground-Based Interceptor (GBI) missiles, Kinetic Energy Interceptor (KEI) and SM-3 Block IIA as well. The MKV technology was being developed on a dual-path basis by Lockheed Martin Space Systems Company, designated MKV-L, and the Raytheon Company (MKV-R). The Missile Defense Agency announced that a test of the MKV-L was conducted 2 December 2008, at the National Hover Test Facility at Edwards Air Force Base, California.

Preliminary indications were that planned test objectives were achieved. Objectives of the test included having the MKV-L hover under its own power and prove its capability to recognize and track a surrogate target in a flight environment. During the test, the MKV-L's propulsion system demonstrated maneuverability while tracking a target. The MKV-L transmitted video and flight telemetry to the ground.

On April 6, 2009, United States Secretary of Defense Robert M. Gates announced that the Pentagon's budget would be reshaped. Under this proposal the MKV program would be terminated.

A similar program was restarted in August 2015, when Raytheon, Boeing, and Lockheed Martin were contracted to design a Multi-Object Kill Vehicle concept. Raytheon released information that seemed to indicate they were exclusively involved in this work, but it was incorrect.

== See also ==
- Kill vehicle
