= Kuluk Bay =

- Khulukh Bay
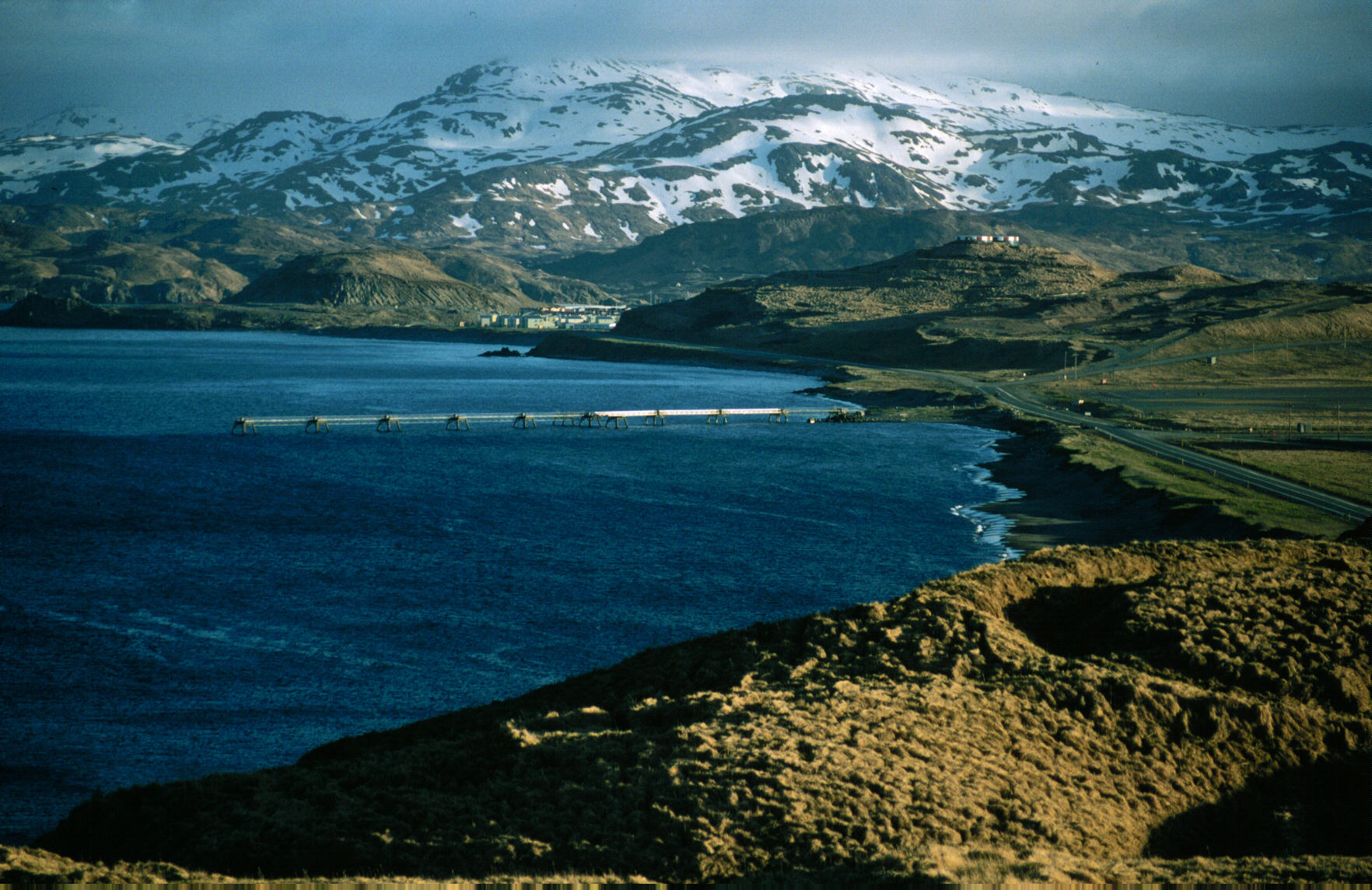
- Kuluk Bay from the north

- Location within Alaska
- Location: Adak Island, Aleutians West Census Area, Alaska
- Coordinates: 51°52′30″N 176°33′47″W
- Type: Bay
- Sections/sub-basins: Sweeper Cove
- Settlements: Adak

Kuluk Bay also known as Khulukh Bay is a small bay located at 51°52′30″N 176°33′47″W on the northeastern side of Adak Island, one of the larger Andreanof Islands of the Aleutian Islands. The bay is significant for its ecology, role in the Second World War, and various examples of contemporary military and administrative action regarding the bay. Kuluk Bay borders the most developed portion of Adak Island; on its western coast lie the industrial and residential areas of the settlement of Adak. Kuluk Bay is also important for recreation on Adak Island, since beach combing and other beach activities are common on its sandy western shore.

Adak's coastline is characterized by steep downward slopes which continue well offshore; leading to extreme depth increase in Sweeper Cove and Kuluk Bay with distance from the shoreline. In Adak, ground water is not typically used as a source of drinking water. Among other reasons, ground water may not be used because it is believed that Adak island's fresh ground water overlies saltwater which enters the aquifer from the adjacent depths of Kuluk Bay and Sweeper Cove.

Fishing, for a variety of species, is another common activity in Kuluk Bay. During August and September, pink salmon runs occur in streams flowing into the bay. The bay also contains extensive mussel beds along the coast at low tide, although these do not appear to have been tremendously exploited as a food source.

Tests on blue mussels from Kuluk Bay have found a significant amount of arsenic contamination, and rock soles in the bay have been found to contain hazardous amounts of PCBs (particularly Aroclor 1254). Subsistence fishermen and others have therefore been advised to restrict their consumption of them.

== Ecology ==
=== Emperor goose migration ===
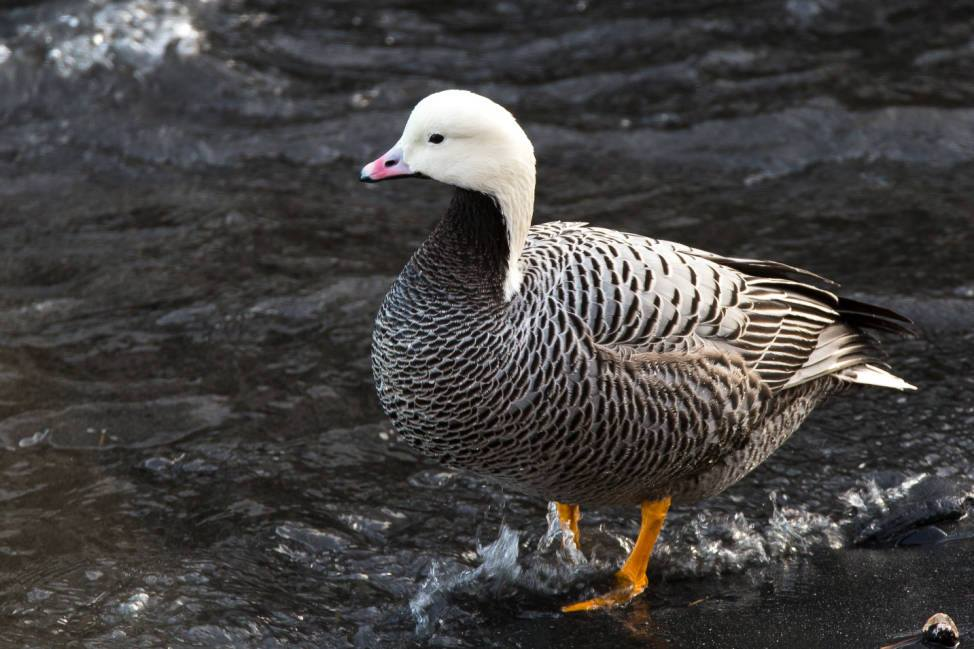
Emperor goose

Perhaps most environmentally significant is Kuluk Bay's role in emperor goose migration. Emperor geese inhabit many of the Aleutian Islands and congregate in numbers as large as 1,000 at Kuluk Bay during the winter. This congregation is especially interesting because emperor geese are typically grouped sparsely and in small numbers during the winter; large gatherings are uncommon. During the winter, Kuluk bay is an important migratory area and serves as a wintering habitat for as much as 1% of the entire emperor goose population.

=== Sea otter population ===
Between 1993 and 1997, the populations of sea otters at Clam lagoon and Kuluk bay at Adak Island were studied and compared. In order for study to take place, a naval restricted area was established in the northwestern section of the bay as of April 29, 1993. This restricted area is defined in The Code of Federal Regulations Title 33-Navigation and Navigable Waters, part 334 Section 334.1320.

In the study Clam lagoon is noted as being a closed aquatic environment, inaccessible to killer whales, while Kuluk bay is noted as an "open coastal environment". During the six-year interval, it was observed that while Clam Lagoon sea otter population remained relatively stable, population in Kuluk Bay decreased by a dramatic 76%. When taking into account the caloric needs of a killer whale, the study concluded that merely 5.05 attacks would have been required at minimum in order to lower the sea otter population to the documented extent. 6 attacks where observed.

== History ==
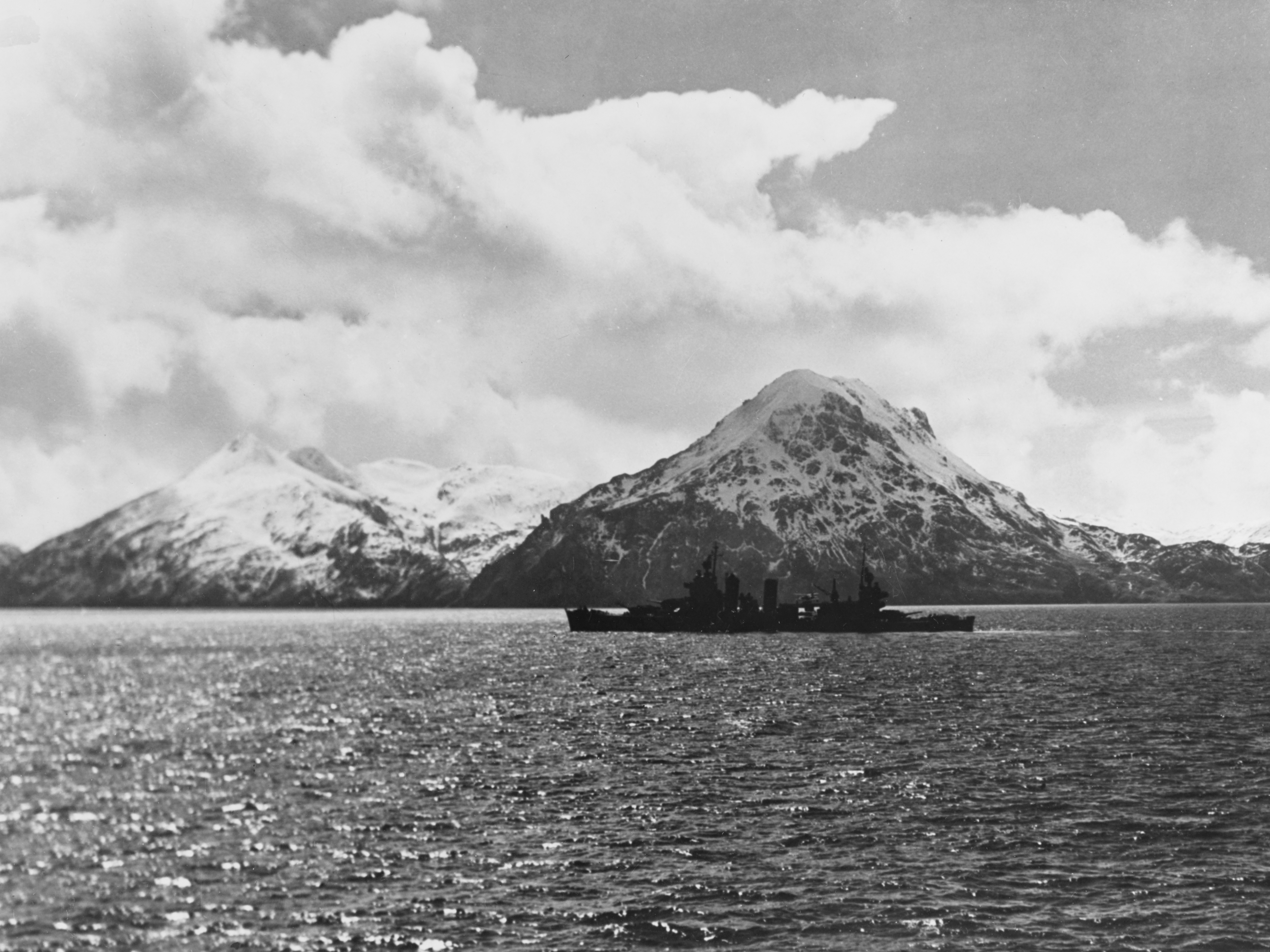
USS San Francisco (CA-38) in Kuluk Bay, Adak Island, April 1943

The history of Kuluk Bay extends as far back as Russian imperial expansion into Alaska; the name of the bay comes from a 1936 transliteration of the Aleut name for the bay, first recorded by Captain Tebenkov of the Russian Imperial Navy in 1852.

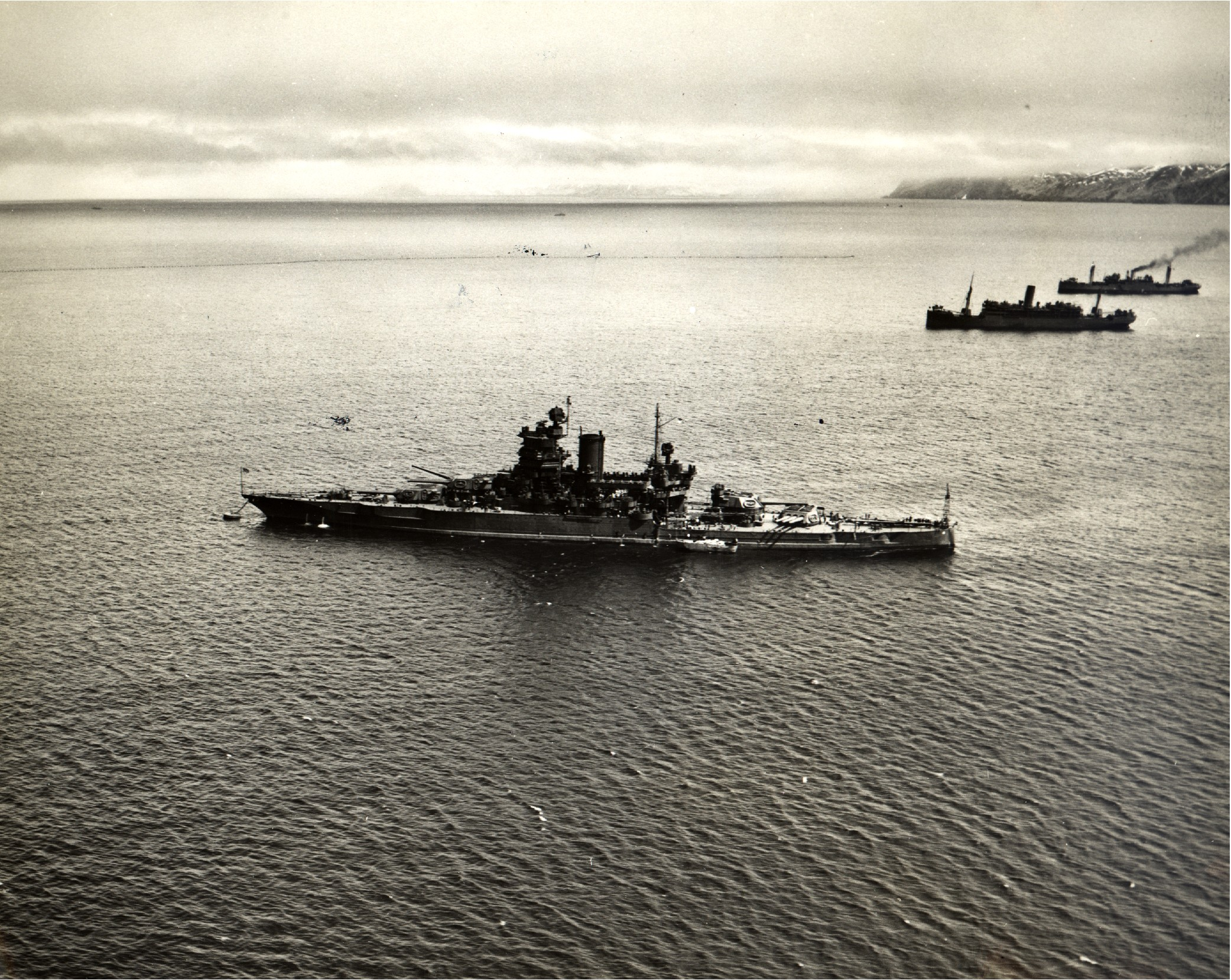
USS Mississippi BB-41 Adak May 1943

Among other locations on Adak Island, Kuluk Bay has a relatively substantial history in Pacific War action by the United States during WWII. One such example is the WWII airfield along Kuluk bay whereupon, in 1942, fighter planes often landed to protect against the possibility of a Japanese offensive. Various locations on Adak Island, including Kuluk Bay, were fortified during the Second World War. At Kuluk Bay There existed a Gun Battery and other large gun emplacements, which used 155mm shells and had a range of 17 miles. These emplacements not only served to protect the bay, but also Adak Harbor to the South.

During 1942, many US military missions also took place at Adak Island, at least three of which took place at Kuluk Bay. On August 30, an American Army operation took place in order to build Adak airfield which ran along Kuluk Bay; On September 2, an 11th Air Force escorted reconnaissance mission took place over Kuluk Bay; finally, On September 3, after bombing Kiska Island, the group of 11th Air Force Bombers and Fighters flew to provide air cover over the bay, however 7 aircraft aborted due to inclement weather conditions.

== Contemporary military activity ==
=== MEC investigation ===
As a part of a large scale MEC (Munitions and Explosives of Concern) investigation on Adak Island from 1996 to 1999, the shoreline of Kuluk Bay was investigated for the presence of WWII and Cold War era land mines. During the investigative process. The region about the settlement of Adak was divided into three regions of priority, the area along Kuluk Bay was investigated as a part of the priority three region. Following the main, six phased investigation of the priority three area, a potential minefield located along Kuluk bay, where six active gun emplacements existed, was searched. Ultimately 89 anomalies were excavated in the beach area, three of which were discovered to be MEC items.

=== Sea-based X-band radar ===
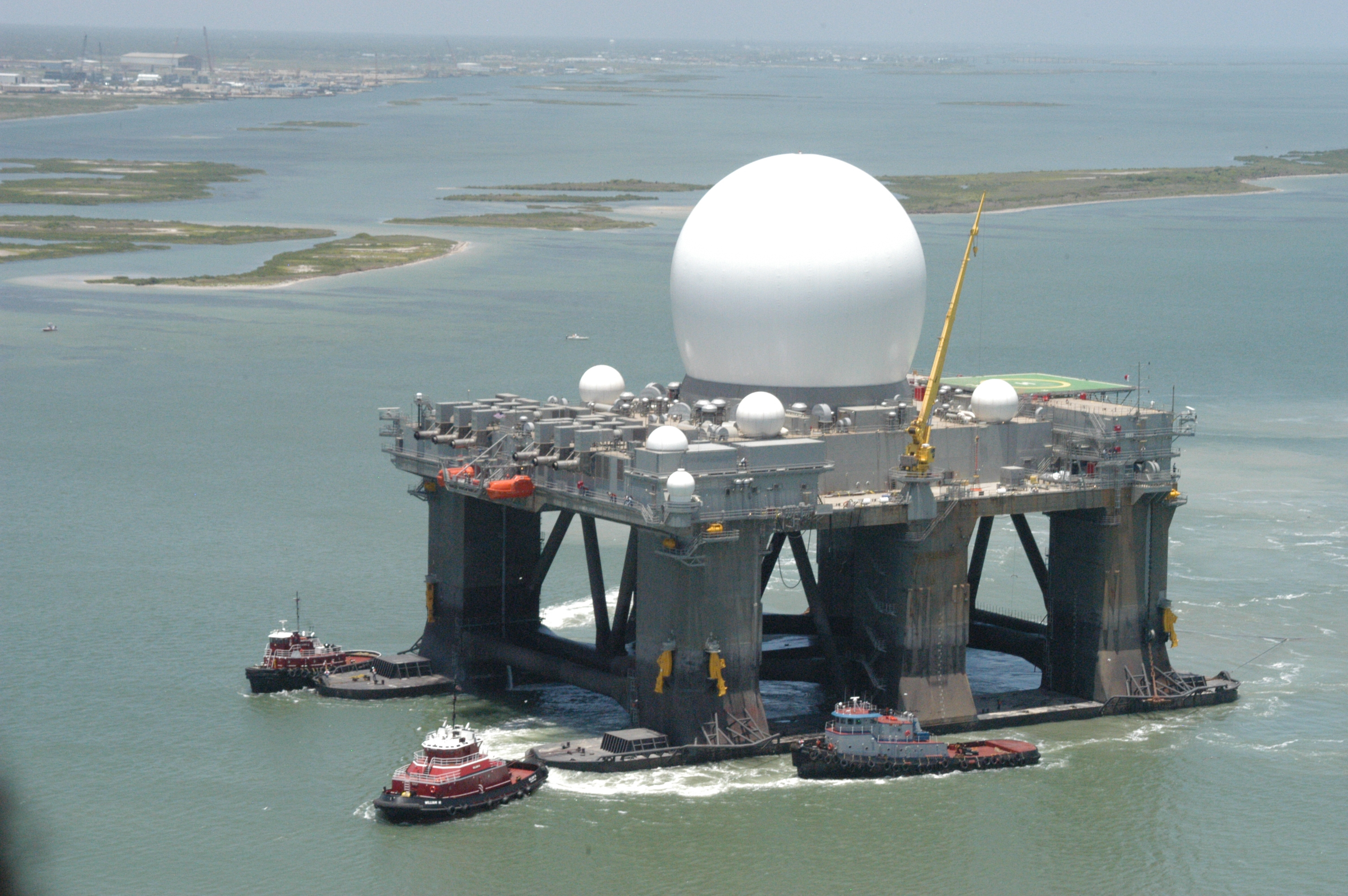
Sea-based X-band radar

Prior to its completion in 2003, the Sea-based X-band radar (SBX 1), a missile defense radar system, was planned to be located in Kuluk bay. The SBX was developed for the United States by Boeing, with Boeing subcontractor, Manson Construction, responsible for creating the Sea-Based radar mooring site Kuluk Bay. Large anchors and other components were placed in the bay using cranes, barges, and tugs. The mooring site was reportedly completed three weeks in advance to the deadline. In preparation for the SBX, roughly 26 million dollars in underwater rigging was prepared in the summer of 2007 in Kuluk Bay. The rigging consisted of steel chains connected between eight 75-ton anchors fixed beneath the bay. Despite its supposed positive economic implications for Adak, as of 2010, the SBX was not located anywhere near Adak Island nor did there exist plans to relocate it to Kuluk Bay.

In preparation for the SBX, a US army restricted area within a radius of 1000 yards about the Sea Based radar mooring site was outlined within the bay. This army restricted area was established in the Code of Federal Regulations Title 33-Navigation and Navigable Waters, part 334. Section 334.1325 as of November 23, 2007. This restricted area was proposed in July 2007 by the US Army Corps of engineers in anticipation of potential movement of the SBX into Kuluk Bay per the Missile Defense Agency. The restriction was intended to better secure the SBX, its crew, and other vessels transiting the area.

=== Polychlorinated biphenyl (PCB) contamination ===
From 1999 through 2011, the United States Navy has sampled polychlorinated biphenyl (PCB) levels in both Kuluk Bay, and sweeper cove within Kuluk Bay. The sampling references a type of fish, rock sole, and a type of shellfish, blue mussel, in order to measure the reflected environmental levels of PCBs within the area.

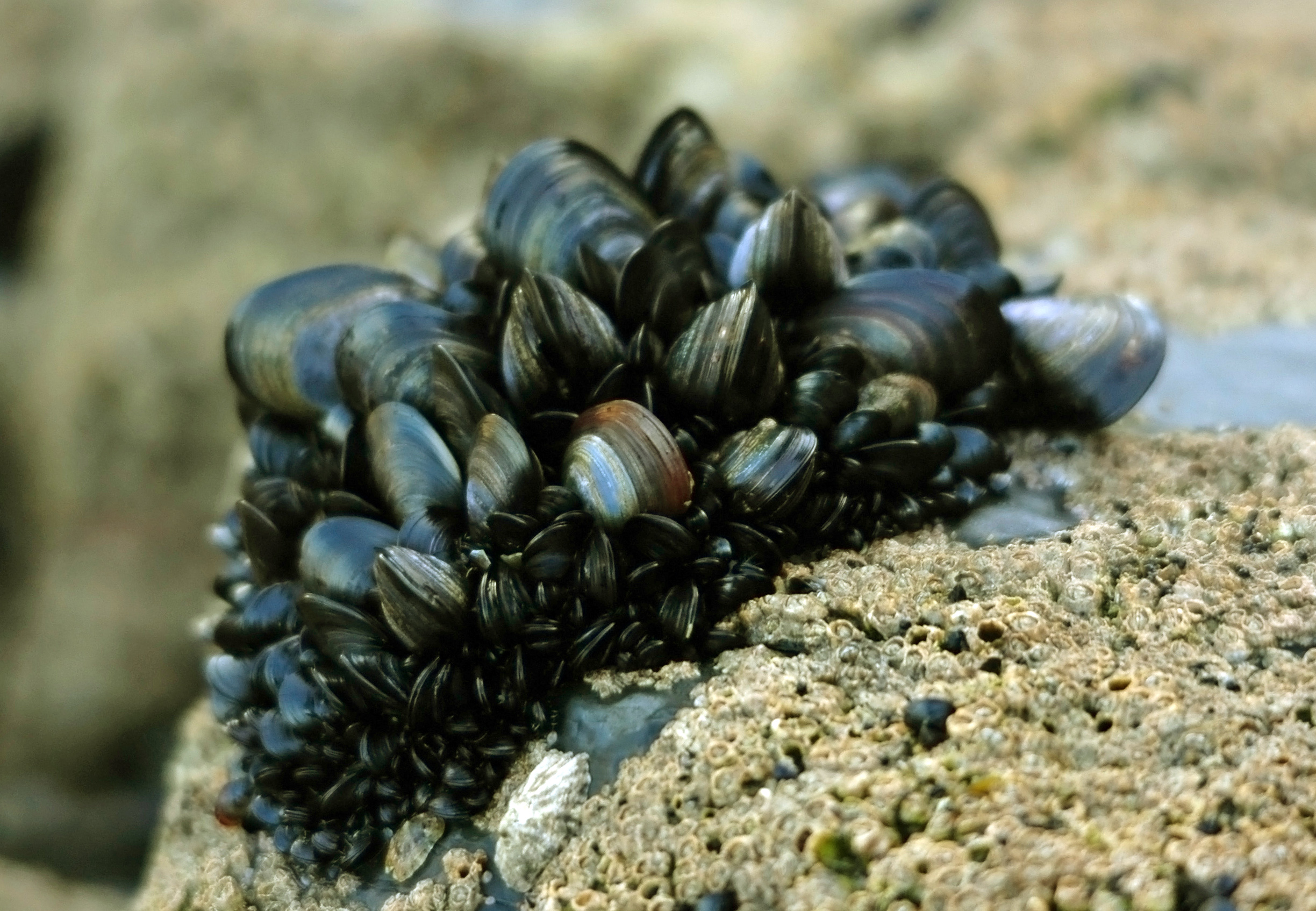
Blue mussel clump

The sampling of PCB levels took place as a part of the Superfund law (CERCLA). Rock sole and blue mussel were chosen because they are common and readily available sources of seafood on Adak Island. After testing, both rock sole and blue mussel were found to contain relatively high amounts of PCBs. As a result, an advisory to limit consumption of either species from Sweeper Cove or Kuluk bay went into effect. After initially monitoring PCB levels for 5 years, in 2003 a decision was made by the United States Navy to monitor PCB levels every other year until 2009; this date was extended to 2011 and then again to 2013 after further samples were collected and examined. As of February 2012, following cleanup of potential contaminants, facilitated by the US Navy, PCB contamination was expected to decrease slowly with time.

Throughout the documented course of study, average levels of PCBs were shown to decrease gradually from their initial high in 1999; however as of 2012 had not decreased below the benchmark maximum concentration of 6.5 ppb (parts per billion) of PCBs. The study also noted that PCB levels were highest in Kuluk bay's sweeper cove, near which contaminants existed with relative proximity.

=== Activity as of 2019 ===
As of September 2019, the US Navy was considering resuming operations and exercises in Kuluk Bay. Recent operations in Kuluk bay are a part of a resurgence in military activity in the Aleutian Islands for the first time in more than 30 years. These new military exercises are designed to test arctic and cold-climate capabilities of the US Navy. Adak Island once was the site of an active military base with roughly 6,000 service members and families, now with a trend of rising sea levels and average temperature, the arctic is becoming more easily navigable, and Kuluk Bay is again being considered for naval and other military activity.
