= Obering =

Obering is a surname. Notable people with the surname include:

- Henry Obering (born 1951), American general
- Mary Obering (1937–2022), American painter
