= Ronald T. Kadish =

United States Air Force general

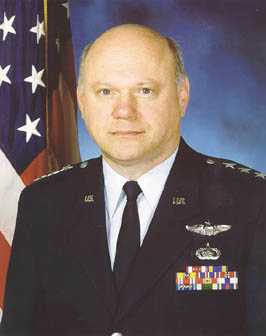
USAF Lt. Gen. Ronald T. Kadish Official Portrait.

Lt. Gen. Ronald T. Kadish, Ret. (born April 6, 1948) is a United States Air Force officer who rose to head the Ballistic Missile Defense Organization and the Missile Defense Agency within the United States Department of Defense.

== Biography ==
Born in Kingston, Pennsylvania, Kadish attended the Cardinal O'Hara High School and earned a bachelor's degree in chemistry in 1970 from St. Joseph's University in Philadelphia and joined the Air Force through the OTS program. He trained as a pilot on the C-130E aircraft and, as a pilot and instructor, logged over 2,500 flight hours.

By the early 1990s, Kadish had risen through the ranks to the posts of Program Director of the F-15, F-16, and C-17 programs at Wright-Patterson Air Force Base. From 1996 to 1999, he commanded the Electronic Systems Center at Hanscom Air Force Base, and in 1999 was named director of the Ballistic Missile Defense Organization in The Pentagon.

From January 2002 until his retirement in September 2004, Kadish headed the Missile Defense Agency. His name was circulated as a possible NASA administrator following the 2004 resignation of Sean O'Keefe. He now works at Booz Allen Hamilton.

== Awards and decorations ==

1st Row	Defense Distinguished Service Medal with oak leaf cluster		Air Force Distinguished Service Medal	Legion of Merit
2nd Row	Meritorious Service Medal with three oak leaf clusters	Air Medal	Air Force Commendation Medal with two oak leaf clusters	Air Force Outstanding Unit Award
3rd Row	Air Force Organizational Excellence Award with three oak leaf clusters	Combat Readiness Medal	Air Force Recognition Ribbon	National Defense Service Medal with two bronze stars
4th Row	Air Force Overseas Ribbon - Long	Air Force Longevity Service Award Ribbon with silver and bronze oak leaf clusters	Small Arms Expert Marksmanship Ribbon	Air Force Training Ribbon
