= US missile defense system in Asia-Pacific Region =

The US missile defense system in the Asia-Pacific region is an element of the national missile defense system of the United States. Perspective early warning system reveals ballistic missile launches and destroys them in the active phase of flight.

== Points of view ==
=== United States ===
According to American military experts, deploying a missile defense system should strengthen security in the region and become a guarantee of non-aggression in the foreseeable future of the DPRK on the Republic of Korea (ROK) or Japan, and, consequently, to the United States.

From 17 to 23 August 2014, Deputy Secretary of Defense Robert O. Work made a working tour of the Asia-Pacific region, during which he met with the heads of the defense ministries of the ROK and Japan, visited Guam and Hawaii. During the meetings the issues of counter-terrorism, global security and missile defense were discussed.

The direction of the US policy to strengthen its influence in the Asia-Pacific region is due to the increasing economic and military potential of China. That also confirms the US desire to form a new alliance of "security" in the Asia-Pacific region, ignoring the positions of Russia and China. The new alliance, forming in the Asia-Pacific region can consist of the Philippines, Australia, and Japan, with the possible participation of Singapore and Thailand. In addition, Washington considers Malaysia as a strategic partner.

According to the military experts, the deployment of US missile defense segment in the region shows the uncertainty of the US leadership in the undeniable advantages of the contingent of troops that is used in an armed conflict with China and North Korea in the South China Sea, the Taiwan Strait and the East China Sea, and Russia in the Kuril Islands.

The elements of the US missile defense system, as well as all military installations outside the territory of the state, are the property of the United States, and are aimed to protect their own interests in the first place.

=== SCO member states ===
SCO member states were critical of the unilateral strengthening of US missile defense system, regarding it as a threat to global security.

=== China ===
According to the statements made by Chinese officials, deploying a missile defense system in Northeast Asia (near the borders of China) will lead to a security violation in the region.

=== Russian Federation ===
The point of view of the Russian government clearly defines the deployment of US missile defense system in the Asia-Pacific region as a security threat.

"We will be adequate and response proportionately to NATO's military infrastructure pushing to our borders and do not leave deployment of a global missile defense and upbuilding strategic stocks of precision weapons unattended." - Vladimir Putin.

According to the Russian Ministry of Foreign Affairs and the Ministry of Defense, Russian authority is confident in the adverse effect of the deployment of the US missile defense system on the military-political situation in Asia-Pacific and the world.

Russian scientists say that the elements of the US missile defense system can adversely affect the health of people living in its vicinity.

=== Japan ===
Japan continues a policy of strengthening existing bilateral alliances (primarily with the USA) and developing relationships with prospective partners, among which is India. In 2014, together with the US Navy "Standard-3" shipborne missiles tests were conducted. According to Chinese media, in October 2014 the US military brought missile defense forces X-band radar to the base of the Armed forces of the United States in Kyoto, the commissioning of which must occur before the end of 2014.

=== North Korea ===
North Korea continues the course of increasing and strengthening its missile forces. On August 14, 2014 it launched the five short-range missiles KY-09, that were carried out in response to the intention of the ROC and the United States to carry out annual joint military exercises "Ulchi-Freedom Guardian". After the start of the exercise, the North Korean leadership has once again accused the ROC and the United States in preparation for the invasion of North Korea and the threat of pre-emptive strike on the territory of South Korea. Also, the North Korean leadership said that it will increase its nuclear capabilities "in the case of deployment of the US mobile complexes THAAD on the territory of the Republic of Korea."

Pyongyang was particularly irritated by the fact that the United States implement their plans in Asia Pacific under the pretext of combating the "threat from the North."

=== South Korea ===
The Republic of Korea (ROK) is a strategic partner of the United States in the Asia-Pacific region. And the question of the development of joint missile defense system aimed primarily against its northern neighbor is no exception. Currently, South Korea has already placed the US anti-missile complexes "Patriot" PAC-2. In the future, the THAAD system will be built.

Deputy Minister of Defense: "We have explained to China and Russia, that it is not strategic missile defense systems. THAAD is designed to support regional security and prevent threats directed against the United States and our allies. We continue to work together with the Chinese and Russian, to dispel any of their concerns that THAAD may pose a threat to their strategic missile systems."

Leaders of ROK shall make every possible effort to coordinate the actions of major countries of Northeast Asia in the issue of nuclear safety, that is expressed in the proposal of President Park Geun-hye to create a consultative body for nuclear safety in Northeast Asia. According to an official statement of the President of South Korea, the main participants of that body will become South Korea, China and Japan. However, Park Geun-hye added, that Russia, the US, North Korea, and Mongolia will also participate in the meetings and negotiations on key issues of regional security.

Seoul still retains a cautious stance, as the deployment of any US missile defense systems will be perceived as taking part in the US-led missile defense program. The ROK leaders also have concerns that the integration of its missile defense system with the US missile defense system could lead to diplomatic tension with China, the largest trading partner of South Korea.
