= Kill vehicle =

Kill vehicle is a term from space weapon development and science fiction which denotes either a kinetic projectile or an explosive warhead supposed to impact on or (in the case of the warhead) near a target. It is the final missile stage of an interceptor weapon.

== See also ==
- Anti-satellite weapon
- Exoatmospheric Kill Vehicle
- Ground-Based Midcourse Defense
- Kinetic kill vehicle
- Multiple Kill Vehicle
