= Kinetic Energy Interceptor =

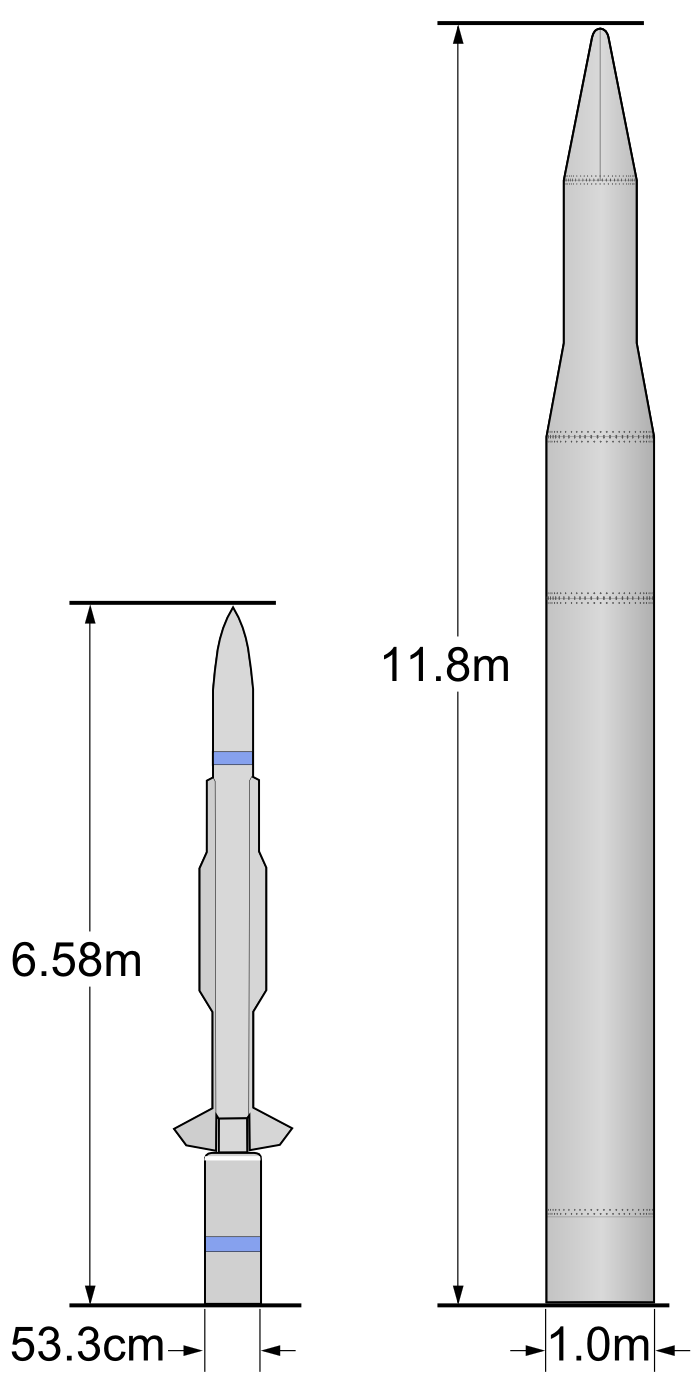
- SM-3 (left) compared to Kinetic Energy Interceptor (right)
- Type: Mobile Ballistic Missile Defense System
- Place of origin: United States

Service history
- In service: Development canceled

Production history
- Designer: Northrop Grumman, Raytheon Missile Systems, Orbital, ATK

Specifications
- Length: 466 in (11.8 m)
- Diameter: 40 in (1.0 m)
- Engine: solid fuel rocket

The Kinetic Energy Interceptor (KEI) was a planned U.S. missile defense program whose goal was to design, develop, and deploy kinetic energy-based, mobile, ground and sea-launched missiles that could intercept and destroy enemy ballistic missiles during their boost, ascent and midcourse phases of flight. The KEI consisted of the Interceptor Component (kinetic projectile), the Mobile Launcher Component, and the Command, Control, Battle Management, and Communications (C2BMC) component.

On 7 May 2009, the KEI program was canceled due primarily to financial reasons.

== First stage rocket motor tests ==
There were five first-stage rocket motor tests planned to be carried out by Alliant Techsystems (ATK) in Promontory, Utah.

The second test firing of a KEI first stage rocket motor was conducted on 14 June 2007. The static firing included a full duration burn and a demonstration of the thrust vector control nozzle.

The fourth test firing of the first-stage rocket motor was completed on November 13, 2008. The test demonstrated a successful operation of the first-stage rocket motor in its final flight configuration that was to be used during a Summer 2009 flight test. Due to the cancellation of KEI in May 2009, this test did not occur.

== Some KEI program implementation and funding history ==
On 7 May 2009, Missile Defense Agency executive director David Altwegg announced that KEI would be canceled due to technical and financial reasons. The announcement had previously been overlooked during Defense Secretary Robert Gates' April 6 press conference on changing priorities in the FY10 defense budget.

== See also ==
- Missile Defense Agency
