= Missile Defense Agency =

Agency of the US Defense Department

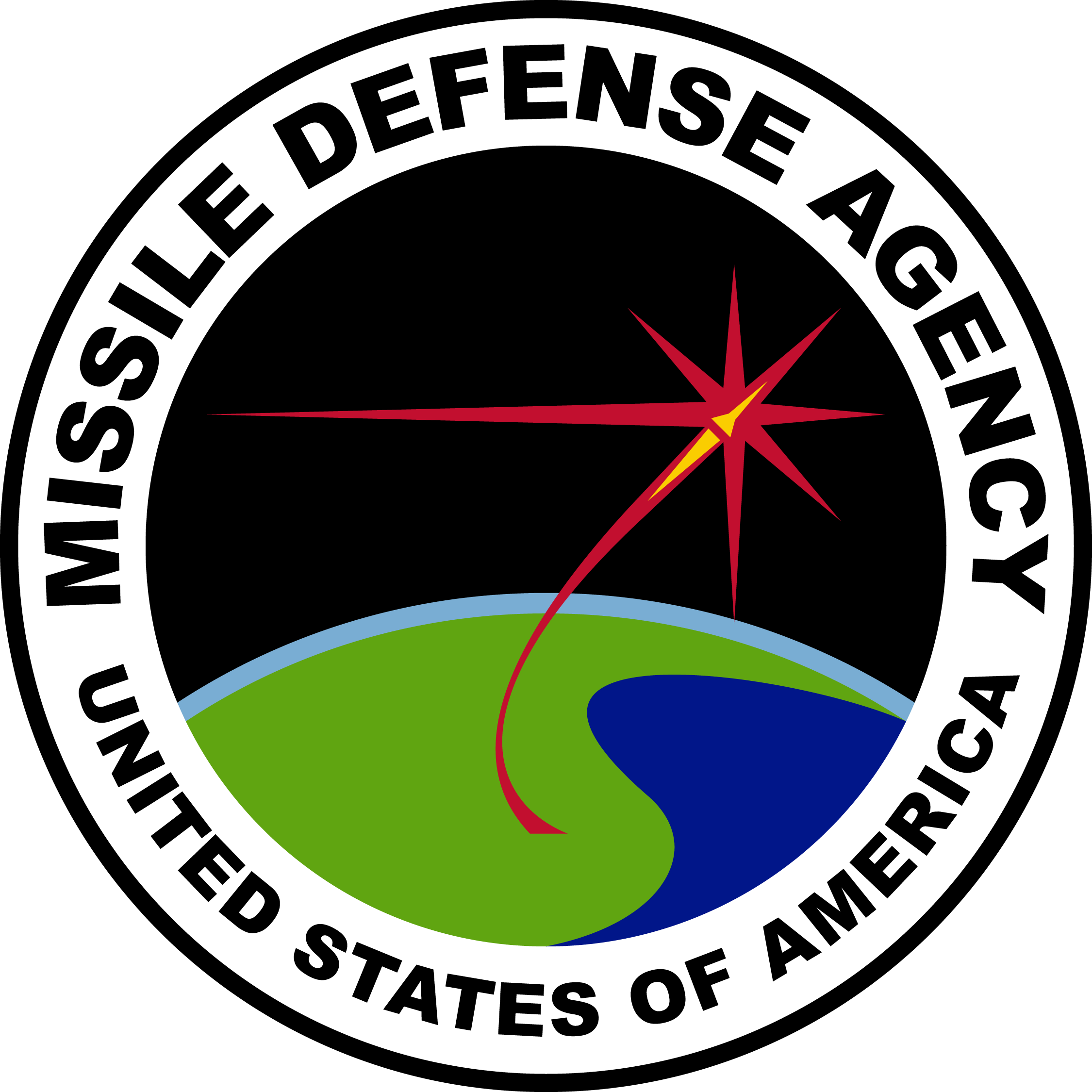
- Official seal of the MDA

Agency overview
- Formed: January 2002; 24 years ago
- Preceding agencies: Strategic Defense Initiative; Ballistic Missile Defense Organization
- Jurisdiction: Federal government of the United States
- Headquarters: Headquarters Command Center, Fort Belvoir, Virginia
- Employees: Approx. 2500 (3000 with non-MDA support personnel) (2016)
- Annual budget: $9.187 billion (FY 2021)
- Agency executives: Lt Gen Heath Collins, Director; Maj Gen D. Jason Cothern, Deputy Director
- Parent agency: Department of Defense
- Website: www.mda.mil

The Missile Defense Agency (MDA) is a component of the United States Department of Defense responsible for developing a comprehensive defense against ballistic missiles. It had its origins in the Strategic Defense Initiative (SDI), which was established in 1983 by President Ronald Reagan and which was headed by Lt. General James A. Abrahamson. Under the Strategic Defense Initiative's Innovative Sciences and Technology Office headed by physicist and engineer Dr. James Ionson, the investment was predominantly made in basic research at national laboratories, universities, and in industry. These programs have continued to be key sources of funding for top research scientists in the fields of high-energy physics, advanced materials, nuclear research, supercomputing/computation, and many other critical science and engineering disciplines—funding which indirectly supports other research work by top scientists, and which was most politically viable to fund from appropriations for national defense. It was renamed the Ballistic Missile Defense Organization in 1993, and then renamed the Missile Defense Agency in 2002. The current director is Lieutenant General Heath A. Collins.

Rapid changes in the strategic environment due to the rapid dissolution of the Soviet Union led, in 1993, to President Bill Clinton focusing on theater ballistic missiles and similar threats, and renaming it the Ballistic Missile Defense Organization, BMDO. With another change to a more global focus made by President George W. Bush, in 2002 the organization became the Missile Defense Agency.

The Missile Defense Agency is partially or wholly responsible for the development of several ballistic missile defense (BMD) systems, including the Patriot PAC-3, Aegis BMD, THAAD and the Ground-Based Midcourse Defense system with a cost of $246 billion.

It also has led the development of numerous other projects, including the Multiple Kill Vehicle and the newer Multi-Object Kill Vehicle, the Kinetic Energy Interceptor and the Airborne Laser. As the inheritor of the SDI and BMDO work, the MDA continues to fund fundamental research in high-energy physics, supercomputing/computation, advanced materials, and many other science and engineering disciplines.

== Mission statement ==
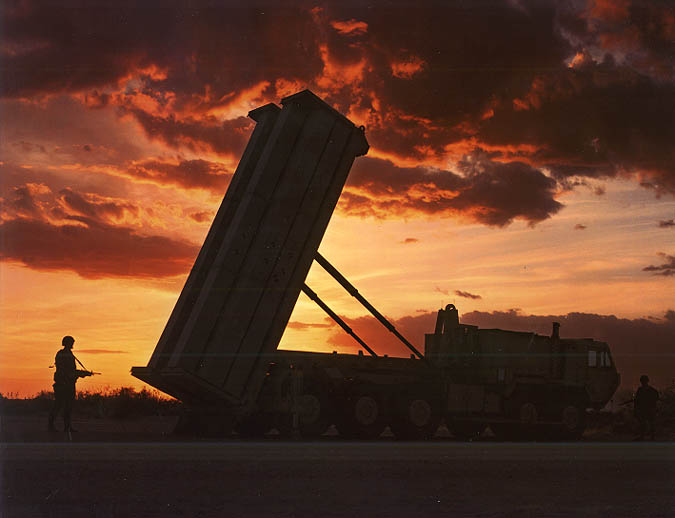
THAAD Anti-ballistic missile launcher

The MDA currently publishes the following mission statement:

The Missile Defense Agency's (MDA) mission is to develop and deploy a layered Missile Defense System to defend the United States, its deployed forces, allies, and friends from missile attacks in all phases of flight.

The National Defense Authorization Act is cited as the original source of the MDA's mission:

It is the policy of the United States to maintain and improve an effective, robust layered missile defense system capable of defending the territory of the United States, allies, deployed forces, and capabilities against the developing and increasingly complex ballistic missile threat with funding subject to the annual authorization of appropriations and the annual appropriation of funds for National Missile Defense. National Defense Authorization Act (Public Law 114–328)

== International mission ==
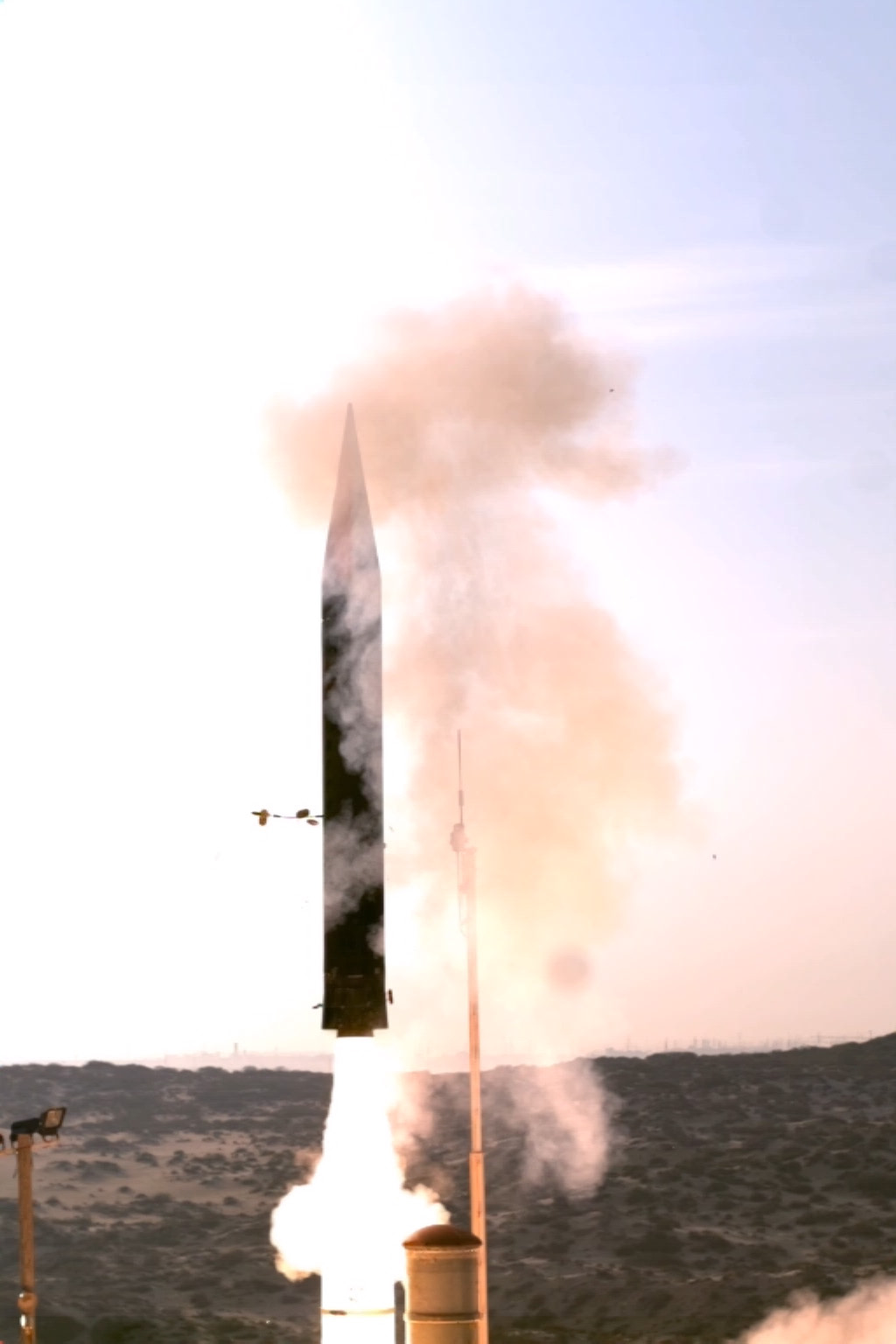
Arrow 3 is an exoatmospheric hypersonic anti-ballistic missile, jointly funded, developed and produced by Israel and the United States.

Ballistic Missile Defense Systems (BMDS) must be capable of operating in different regions of the world to ensure the success of the MDA mission. The International Strategy was approved by the MDA Director in 2007. The general strategy for international efforts is:

Outreach: Communicate the importance of missile defense by promoting worldwide BMDS by sharing information with allies and partners.
Capability and Interoperability: Identify and integrate U.S and partner systems to create global missile defense system. Promote interoperability among allies.
Technology: Identify and evaluate possible international technology in support of BMDS capabilities.
Investment: Identify and execute investment opportunities with allies and partners.
Workforce: Shape a qualified workforce to execute the MDA International Strategy.

As of 2017 MDA was working on facilities in Germany, Romania, Poland, Japan, Qatar, Saudi Arabia and the United Arab Emirates.

== Categories ==
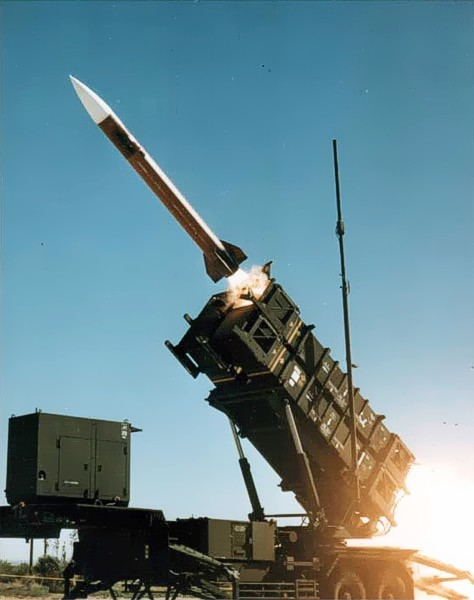
MIM-104 Patriot surface-to-air missile (SAM) with anti-ballistic missile capabilities.

MDA divides its systems into four phases: boost; ascent; mid-course; and terminal. Each of these corresponds to a different phase of the threat ballistic missile flight regime. Each phase offers different advantages and disadvantages to a missile defense system (see missile defense classified by trajectory phase), and the geography of each defended area dictates the types of systems which can be employed. The resultant flexible and layered defense approach concept is believed to improve overall defense effectiveness. The more opportunities a system has to neutralize a threat (e.g., by shooting down a missile), the better the chance of success.

Activities have also been categorized as fulfilling the goals of one of five "blocks". For example, "block 4.0" was stated as "Defend Allies and Deployed Forces in Europe from Limited Iranian Long-Range Threats and Expand Protection of U.S. Homeland". It included the US missile defense complex in Poland to be constructed, and the European Mid-course Radar (EMR), currently located at the Ronald Reagan Ballistic Missile Defense Test Site at Kwajalein Atoll, which was to have been modified and relocated to the Czech Republic.

On 17 September 2009, the Obama administration scrapped the "block 4.0" plan, in favor of a new so-called "European Phased Adaptive Approach" (EPAA).

=== Boost phase ===
Can intercept all ranges of missiles, but the missile boost phase is only from one to five minutes. It is the best time to track the missile because it is bright and hot. The missile defense interceptors and sensors must be in close proximity to the launch, which is not always possible. This is the most desirable interception phase because it destroys the missile early in flight at its most vulnerable point and the debris will typically fall on the launching nations' territory.

=== Ascent phase ===
This is the phase after powered flight but before the apogee. It is significantly less challenging than boost phase intercepts, less costly, minimizes the potential impact of debris, and reduces the number of interceptors required to defeat a raid of missiles.

=== Midcourse phase ===
This phase begins after the booster burns out and begins coasting in space. This can last as long as 20 minutes. Any debris remaining will burn up as it enters the atmosphere. Ground-based missile defense systems can defend from long-range and intermediate-range ballistic missiles in this phase. Mobile elements can defend against medium and short ranged missiles in midcourse.

=== Terminal phase ===
This phase is the last chance to intercept the warhead. This contains the least-desirable Interception Point (IP) because there is little room for error and the interception will probably occur close to the defended target.

== Defenses ==
=== Boost phase defense ===
Research and development:

- Kinetic Energy Interceptor (KEI) – In December 2003, MDA awarded a contract to Northrop Grumman for developing and testing. It will have to be launched from a location not too far from the launch site of the target missile (and is therefore less suitable against large countries), it has to be fired very soon after launch of the target, and it has to be very fast itself (6 km/s). In 2009, the Department of Defense and MDA determined the technological issues were excessive and cancelled the program, allocating no funding for it in its later budget submission.
- Boeing YAL-1 Airborne Laser (ABL) – Team ABL proposed and won the contract for this system in 1996. A high-energy laser mounted on a converted 747 airliner was used to intercept a test target in January 2010, and the following month, successfully destroyed two test missiles. While the program has been cancelled due to concerns about its practicality with present technology (while successful the system was still extremely short ranged, likely needing to fly in heavily defended space to make an interception) the YAL-1 served to demonstrate the potential of such a system. The capabilities of being deployed rapidly to any part of the world and of intercepting a large number of missiles would make a future system extremely attractive. However, the entire concept was deemed infeasible and cancelled without successors in December 2011.
- Network Centric Airborne Defense Element (NCADE) – On September 18, 2008 Raytheon announced it had been awarded a $10 million contract to continue research and development of NCADE, a missile defense system based on the AIM-120 AMRAAM.
- Golden Dome, multi-layer missile defense system for the United States, intended to detect and destroy ballistic, hypersonic, and cruise missiles before they launch or during flight.

One can distinguish disabling the warheads and just disabling the boosting capability. The latter has the risk of "shortfall": damage in countries between the launch site and the target location.

See also APS report.

=== Ascent phase defense ===
Research and development:

- Ascent-Phase intercept System (API) – Emerging intercept technologies are being developed and designed to defeat launched missiles in their ascent phase. This phase is after the boost phase and prior to the threat missile's apogee (midcourse). The Ascent phase intercept program is still classified so there is little information on it.
- Golden Dome

=== Midcourse (ballistic) phase defense ===
In use:

- Ground-Based Midcourse Defense (GMD)
- Aegis Ballistic Missile Defense System (Aegis BMD)

Research and development:

- Multiple Kill Vehicle (MKV, originally Miniature Kill Vehicle): the Department of Defense has canceled the MKV program in 2009, however a similar program restarted in August 2015, when Raytheon, Boeing, and Lockheed Martin were contracted to design a Multi-Object Kill Vehicle concept.

=== Hypersonic glide phase defense ===
Research and development:

This section included material from United States Army Futures Command

By 2021, the Missile Defense Agency (MDA) realized that it almost had a countermeasure to hypersonic boost-glide weapons, by using existing data on the adversary hypersonic systems which were gathered from existing US satellite and ground-based sensors. MDA then fed this data into its existing systems models, and concluded that the adversary hypersonic weapon's glide phase offered the best chance for MDA to intercept it. MDA next proffered a request for information (RFI) from the defense community for building interceptors (denoted the GPI —glide phase interceptor) against the glide phase of that hypersonic weapon. GPIs would be guided by Hypersonic and Ballistic Tracking Space Sensors (HBTSS). These GPI interceptors could first be offered to the Navy for Aegis to intercept using the C2BMC, and later to the Army for THAAD to intercept using IBCS. By 2024, a first test of the hypersonic tracking sensors was imminent.

- Glide Phase Interceptor, in Sep 2024, Northrup Grumman was selected to continue development on the Glide Phase Interceptor, a new missile defense asset designed to take down hypersonic weapons during the glide phase of the flight.
- Golden Dome

=== Terminal phase defense ===
In use:

- Terminal High Altitude Area Defense (THAAD)
- PATRIOT Advanced Capability-3 (PAC-3)
- Arrow missile, a joint effort between the U.S. and Israel

Research and development:

- Medium Extended Air Defense System (MEADS), co-developmental program of the United States Department of Defense, Germany and Italy.
- Golden Dome

== List of directors ==
No.	Director		Term			Service branch
No.	Portrait	Name	Took office	Left office	Duration	Service branch
Director, Strategic Defense Initiative Organization
1	James A. Abrahamson	Lieutenant General; James A. Abrahamson (born 1933)	March 27, 1984	January 31, 1989	4 years, 310 days	U.S. Air Force
2	George L. Monahan Jr.	Lieutenant General; George L. Monahan Jr. (born 1933)	February 1, 1989	June 30, 1990	1 year, 149 days	U.S. Air Force
3	Henry F. Cooper	Ambassador; Henry F. Cooper (born 1936)	July 10, 1990	January 20, 1993	2 years, 194 days	U.S. Foreign; Service
Director, Ballistic Missile Defense Organization
4	Malcolm R. O'Neill	Lieutenant General; Malcolm R. O'Neill (born 1940)	November 22, 1993	August 1, 1996	2 years, 253 days	U.S. Army
5	Lester L. Lyles	Lieutenant General; Lester L. Lyles (born 1946)	August 1, 1996	May 28, 1999	2 years, 300 days	U.S. Air Force
6	Ronald T. Kadish	Lieutenant General; Ronald T. Kadish (born 1948)	June 14, 1999	January 2, 2002	2 years, 202 days	U.S. Air Force
Director, Missile Defense Agency
6	Ronald T. Kadish	Lieutenant General; Ronald T. Kadish (born 1948)	January 2, 2002	July 2, 2004	2 years, 182 days	U.S. Air Force
7	Henry A. Obering III	Lieutenant General; Henry A. Obering III (born c. 1954)	July 2, 2004	November 21, 2008	4 years, 142 days	U.S. Air Force
8	Patrick J. O'Reilly	Lieutenant General; Patrick J. O'Reilly (born c. 1959)	November 21, 2008	November 19, 2012	3 years, 364 days	U.S. Army
9	James D. Syring	Vice Admiral; James D. Syring (born 1963)	November 19, 2012	June 16, 2017	4 years, 209 days	U.S. Navy
10	Samuel A. Greaves	Lieutenant General; Samuel A. Greaves (born c. 1963)	June 26, 2017	May 31, 2019	1 year, 339 days	U.S. Air Force
11	Jon A. Hill	Vice Admiral; Jon A. Hill (born 1963)	May 31, 2019	July 31, 2023	4 years, 61 days	U.S. Navy
-	Douglas L. Williams	Rear Admiral (lower half); Douglas L. Williams; Acting	August 1, 2023	December 5, 2023	126 days	U.S. Navy
12	Heath A. Collins	Lieutenant General; Heath A. Collins (born c. 1971)	December 5, 2023	Incumbent	2 years, 349 days	U.S. Air Force

== See also ==
- Ground-Based Interceptor#Next generation interceptor (NGI)
- Joint Functional Component Command for Integrated Missile Defense
- National Missile Defense
- United States Strategic Command
- US missile defense system in Asia-Pacific Region
