= Ballistic Missile Defense Organization =

Former agency of the United States Department of Defense

- BMDO

Agency overview
- Formed: 1974 (original); 1993 (newer version)
- Preceding agency: Strategic Defense Initiative (1993)
- Dissolved: 1984 (renamed); 2002 (renamed)
- Superseding agencies: Strategic Defense Initiative (1984); Missile Defense Agency (2002)
- Jurisdiction: Federal government of the United States

The Ballistic Missile Defense Organization (BMDO) was an agency of the United States Department of Defense that began on 20 May 1974 with the responsibility for all U.S. ballistic missile defense efforts. It was renamed the Missile Defense Agency in 2002.

== History ==
BMDO evolved from the SAFEGUARD System Organization. The original mission of BMDO was comparable to that of SAFEGUARD, which was to defend U.S. ballistic missile sites, but BMDO additionally had the more general role of conducting research and development in advanced ballistic missile defense (BMD) technology and also managed what was then called the Kwajalein Missile Range (KMR). In July 1984, BMDO became a part of the Strategic Defense Initiative Organization (SDIO) and one year later BMDO was renamed the U.S. Army Strategic Defense Command.

The name "Ballistic Missile Defense Organization" (BMDO) came back into use in 1993 when SDIO was renamed BMDO by the administration of President Bill Clinton and this was accompanied by a shift in emphasis from national missile defense to theater missile defense, i.e. from global to regional coverage. In 1998, focus shifted back to national missile defense when Defense Secretary William Cohen proposed spending an additional $6.6 billion on ballistic missile defense programs to build a national system to protect against attacks from North Korea or accidental launches from Russia or China.

BMDO became better known in the public eye in 1994 when it launched a space probe, Clementine, to the Moon, in collaboration with NASA. BMDO was primarily interested in field testing new satellite and space reconnaissance technologies incorporated in Clementine, technologies which enabled Clementine to discover pockets of ice at the Moon's south pole.

BMDO was renamed the Missile Defense Agency in 2002 by the administration of President George W. Bush.

== Timeline ==
Ballistic Missile Defense Organization (BMDO)

== See also ==
- Strategic Defense Initiative Organization (SDIO), predecessor organization
- Missile Defense Agency (MDA), successor organization
- Ground-Based Midcourse Defense (GMD), previously named National Missile Defense (NMD)
- Anti-satellite weapons
- Anti-ballistic missile
- Militarization of space
