= Henry Obering =

United States Air Force general

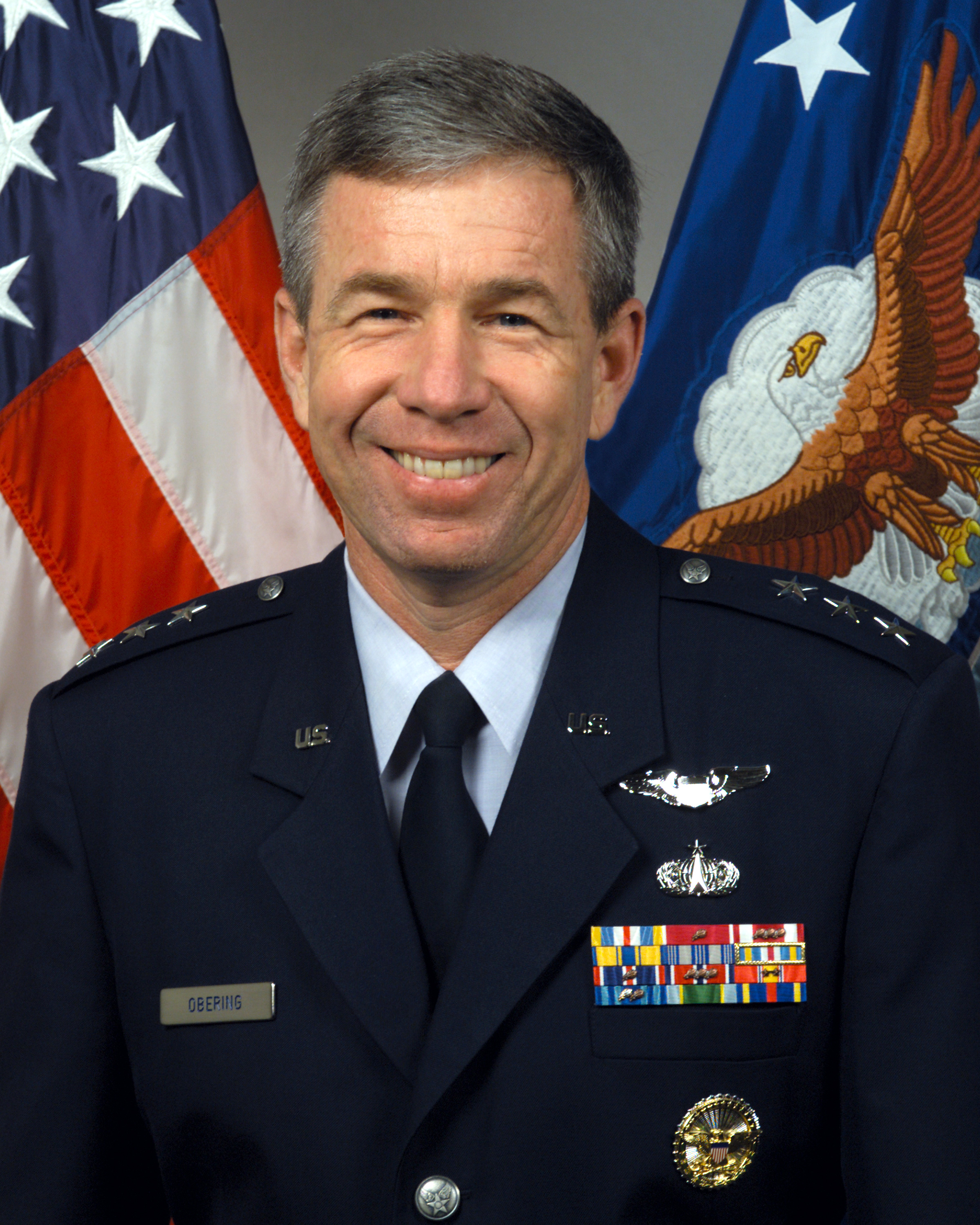
Lt. Gen. Henry Obering in 2004

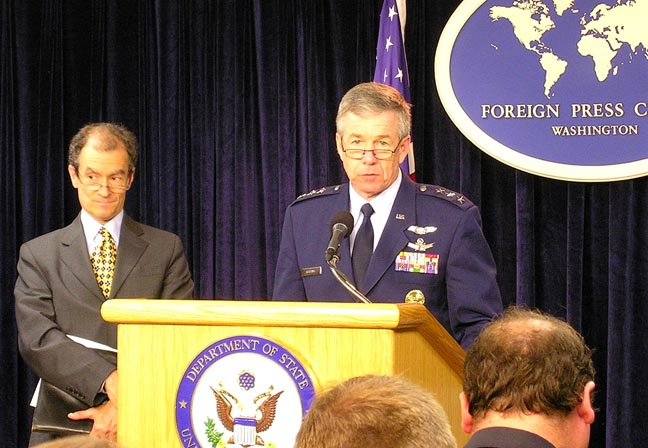
Henry A. Obering [right] at the Washington Foreign Press Center Briefing on "Missile Defense in Europe."

Henry Anthony Obering III is a retired lieutenant general of the United States Air Force. His last assignment prior to retirement was as Director of the Missile Defense Agency.

Obering is a native of Birmingham, Alabama and joined the Air Force in 1973 after completing the Reserve Officer Training Corps (ROTC) program at University of Notre Dame as a distinguished graduate. Obering received his pilot wings in 1975 and flew operational assignments in the F-4E; he was later assigned to the Space Shuttle program and participated in 15 space shuttle launches as a NASA orbiter project engineer and was responsible for integrating firing room launch operations. Obering has also been assigned to tours with the Air Force Inspector General, the Defense Mapping Agency and Electronic Systems Center.

In addition to his Bachelor of Science degree in aerospace engineering, Obering is a graduate of Squadron Officer School; Stanford University, with a Master of Science degree in astronautical engineering; Air Command and Staff College; and Industrial College of the Armed Forces.

He and his wife Anne have 3 children; Arianne, Anthony (Dank) (40), and Paul.
