= Air Defense Command (Israel) =

Israeli military unit

- מערך ההגנה האווירית
- Active: 1948–present
- Country: Israel
- Allegiance: Israel Defense Forces
- Branch: Israeli Air Force
- Role: Anti-aircraft warfare
- Mottos: אנשים עם מטרה "People with a target/purpose"

Commanders
- Current commander: Tat aluf Gilad Biran

Insignia
- Flag

The Air Defense Command (Hebrew: מערך ההגנה האווירית) is the Israeli Air Force unit responsible for the surface front of Israel's air defense, complementing the air defense provided by Fighter squadrons. Initially a part of the IDF Artillery Corps, since 1970 the Air Defense Command has been subordinate to the Israeli Air Force.

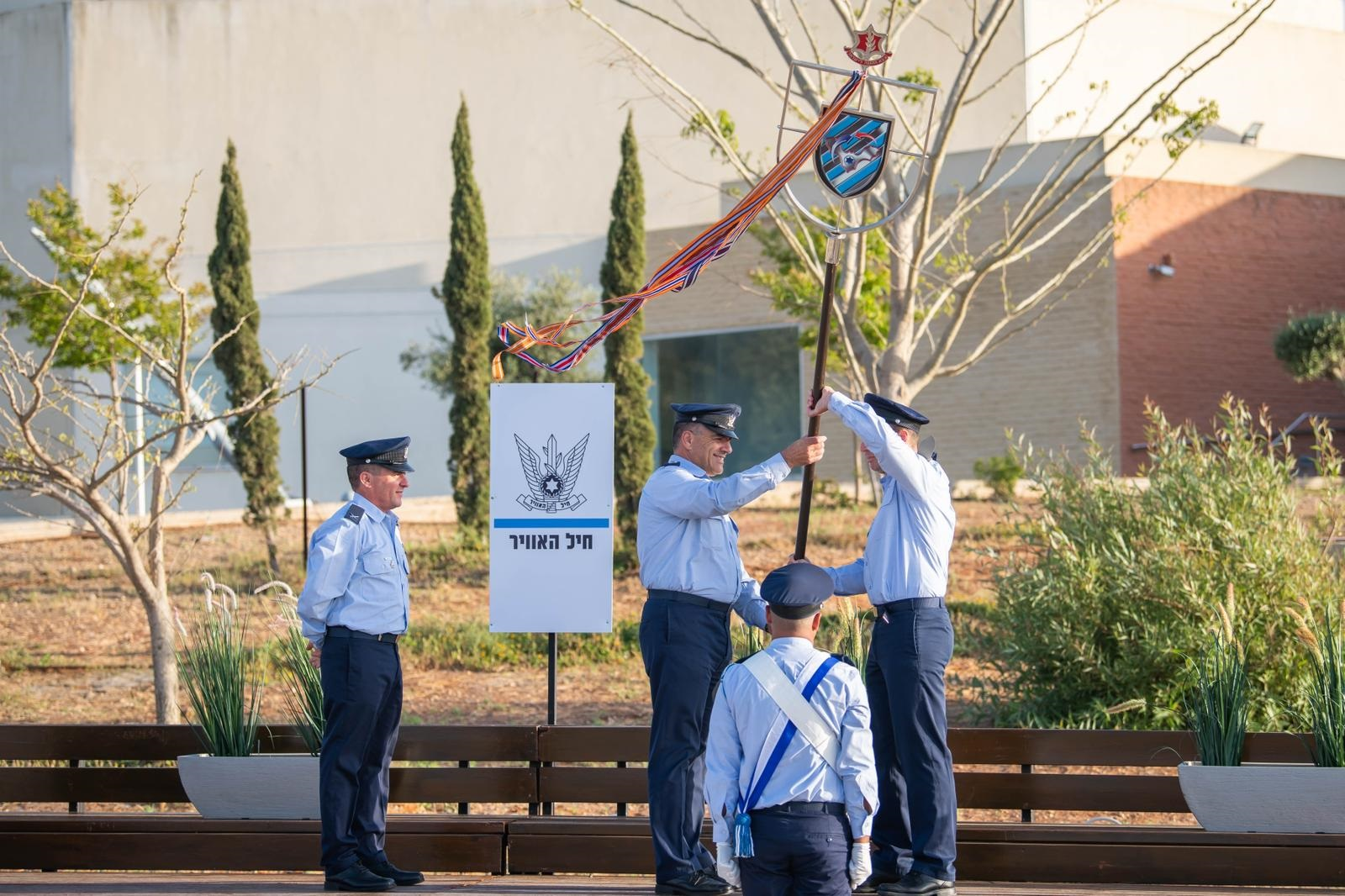
Air Defense Command change of command ceremony at Palmachim Airbase, in April 2021

== History ==
During the 1948 Arab–Israeli War, the Air Defense Network was part of the Artillery Corps, primarily relying on machine guns. During the 1960s, 40 mm radar-guided anti-aircraft guns were introduced, and in 1965, MIM-23 Hawk surface-to-air missiles. The latter were operated by the Air Force's surface-to-air units. In the 1970s, the entire Air Defense Network was merged with the Air Force.

The Air Defense Command operated many United States-developed short-range system such as the MIM-23 Hawk, the MIM-72 Chaparral and M163 VADS ("Hovet"). The Air Defense Command scored world premier interceptions with most of these systems, mainly against the Syrian Air Force.

Due to increasing rocket threat from the Gaza Strip, Israeli-developed Iron Dome C-RAM system became operational in 2011. In 2011 the system scored its first interception and since then intercepted hundreds of short- and medium-ranged rockets, fired by Hamas from the Gaza Strip, gaining world acclaim for its effectiveness and success.

On 23 September 2014, a Syrian Air Force Su-24 was shot down by an IAF MIM-104 Patriot surface-to-air missile battery, after allegedly crossing the Syrian-Israeli ceasefire line during a ground attack mission against Syrian opposition forces. This was the first operational shoot down of crewed enemy aircraft for the Patriot in the world. A few months earlier, Israeli Patriot batteries shot down 2 Hamas drones.

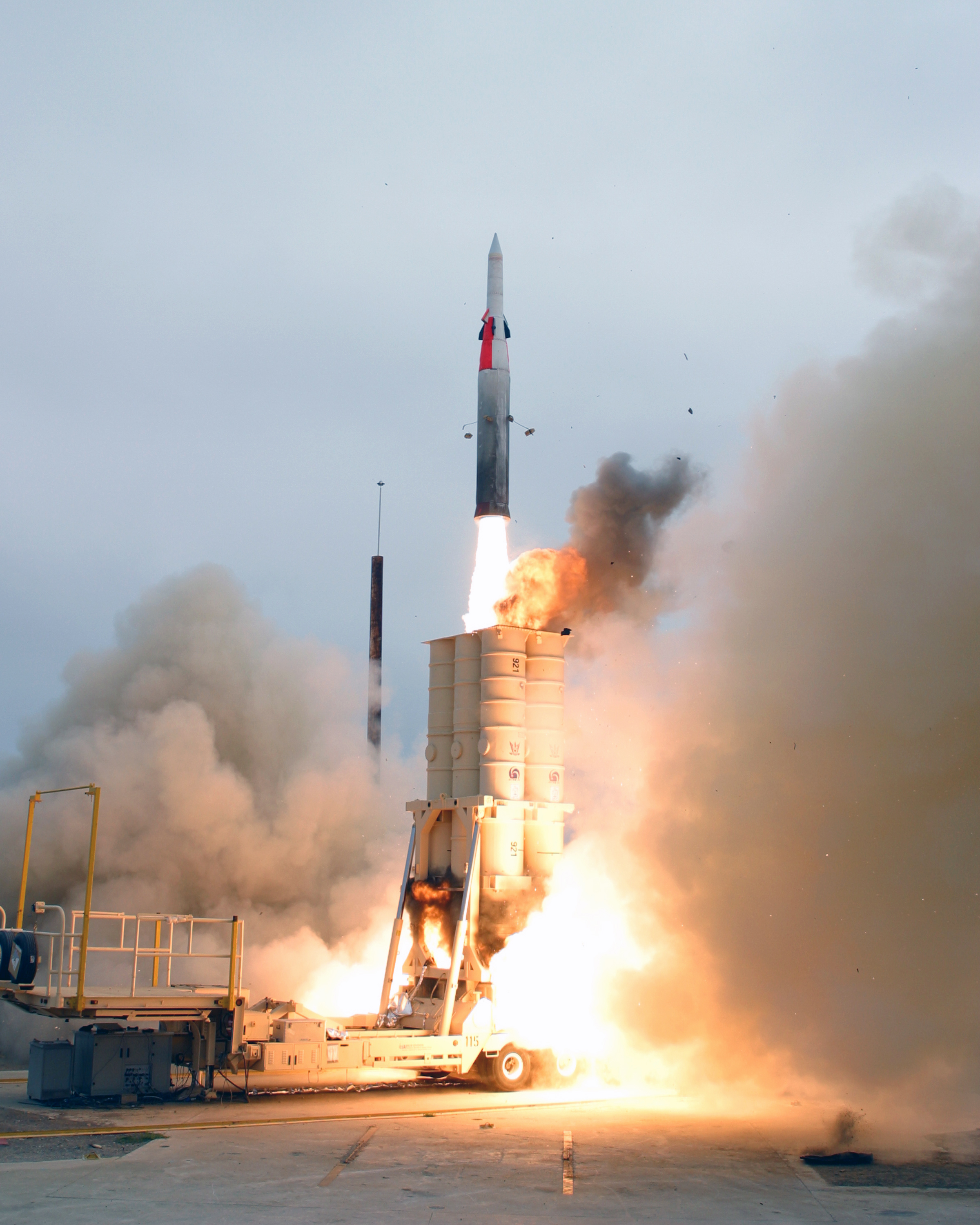
Arrow 2 TMD missile system

== Weapons and equipment ==
- Arrow missile, an Israeli developed - US funding theatre missile defence (TMD) system meant to stop ballistic missiles in the stratosphere. Israel has batteries of Arrow 2 and Arrow 3 missiles.
- Barak MX Air and Missile Defense System, a variant of the Barak 8 manufactured by Israel Aerospace Industries, is deployed in its Ground-Based configuration. The Barak MX's Multi-Domain deployment with both the Israeli Air Force and the Israeli Navy was unveiled during operation "Rising Lion", its combat-use until then held in secret. Barak MX is capable of intercepting advanced tactical ballistic missiles, cruise missiles, rockets and advanced aircraft.
- David's Sling missile, advanced medium- to long-range atmospheric missile defense interceptor. Capable of downing of any kind of advanced tactical ballistic missiles, advanced cruise missiles, large-caliber rockets, UAV, UCAV, fighter and bomber jets.
- Iron Dome, a short-range air defense system designed to defend against rockets, artillery shells, and precision-guided munitions. The first battery became operational in May 2010.
- Light Blade, a short range laser directed weapon system designed to defend against Incendiary balloons, Incendiary kites, and miniature UAV's. There is only one Light Blade deployed.
- Red Sky, a low-altitude air defense system designed for shorter ranges than the Iron Dome.

Future systems:

- Iron Beam, a short range laser directed weapon system designed to intercept against rockets, artillery shells, and mortar bombs. the system is in the advanced testing phase and expected to enter service in 2025.
- Arrow 4 - a new upgraded arrow system from the arrow family with new abilities. Under development in Israel.
- SkySonic - a new anti hypersonic - maneuvering missiles system. Under development in Israel.

== Organization ==
Although a part of the Air and Space Force, the command has the same unit structure as the Artillery Corps. Its current commander is Brigadier-General Gilad Biran, who is directly subordinate to the commander of the Air and Space Force.
