= Sky Shield (disambiguation) =

Sky Shield is an Israeli airborne electronic warfare system.

Sky Shield or Skyshield may also refer to:

- The European Sky Shield Initiative (ESSI), a projected ground-based integrated European air defence system
- The European Sky Shield for Ukraine is a proposed European-led air protection strategy designed to defend western and central Ukraine.
- Skyshield, a Swiss short range air defense (SHORAD) system
- Operation Sky Shield, a series of US air defense exercises conducted between 1960 and 1962
