= Oster (disambiguation) =

Oster may refer to:

== Geography ==
- Oster, a town in Chernihiv Oblast, Ukraine
- Oster, Minnesota, an unincorporated community in the United States
- Oster (river), a tributary of the Desna in Ukraine
- Oster (Blies), a small river in the Saarland, Germany

== Other uses ==
- Oster (surname), list of people with the surname
- SS Oster, a steam ferry that sailed the fjords near Bergen, Norway from 1908 to 1963
- Östers IF (ice hockey) or simply Öster, a defunct Swedish hockey team

== See also ==
- John Oster Manufacturing Company, a manufacturer of kitchen appliances, popularly known for the Oster Kitchen Center
- Ostyor, Russia, a former urban-type settlement in Smolensk Oblast, Russia; since 2004—a rural locality
