= European missile defense =

European missile defense can refer to:

- European Sky Shield Initiative
- NATO missile defense system
