= Drone Dome =

Anti-aircraft system

Drone Dome (Hebrew: כיפת רחפן, kipat rahfan) is a counter unmanned aerial system (C-UAS) anti-aircraft system developed by Israel-based miltech Rafael Advanced Defense Systems. The system was first displayed in 2016, and joins similar protection systems developed by Rafael such as the Iron Dome.

The Drone Dome hosts different sensors including a RADA Electronic Industries RPS-42 radar, a CONTROP Precision Technologies imaging system, and radio signal detectors.

The system was reported to have been deployed in Argentina during the 2018 G20 Buenos Aires summit and the 2018 Summer Youth Olympics in Buenos Aires.

In October 2026, local Cypriot news reported Drone Dome was being acquired to protect the country's Barak MX batteries.

== See also ==
- Iron Beam
