= Rafael Advanced Defense Systems =

Israeli defense company

Coordinates: 32.8684°N 35.0931°E

Rafael Advanced Defense Systems Ltd.
- Type: Government-owned corporation
- Industry: Defense, Aerospace
- Predecessor: Science Corps
- Founded: 1948; 78 years ago
- Headquarters: Kiryat Bialik, Israel
- Key people: Yoav Har-Even (CEO and President)
- Products: Military aerospace Missiles; Ordnance; Defense electronics Protection systems Naval systems
- Revenue: ▲$4.850 billion USD (2024)
- Net income: ▲$159 million USD (2024)
- Owner: State of Israel
- Number of employees: 10,000
- Divisions: Missiles and NCW Division; Ordnance and Protection Division; Manor – Advanced Defense Technologies Division
- Subsidiaries: RDC (RAFAEL Development Corporation)
- Website: www.rafael.co.il

Rafael Advanced Defense Systems Ltd. (Hebrew: רפאל - מערכות לחימה מתקדמות בע"מ) is an Israeli defense technology company. It was founded as Israel's National R&D Defense Laboratory for the development of weapons and military technology within the Israeli Ministry of Defense; in 2002 it was incorporated as a limited company.

== History ==
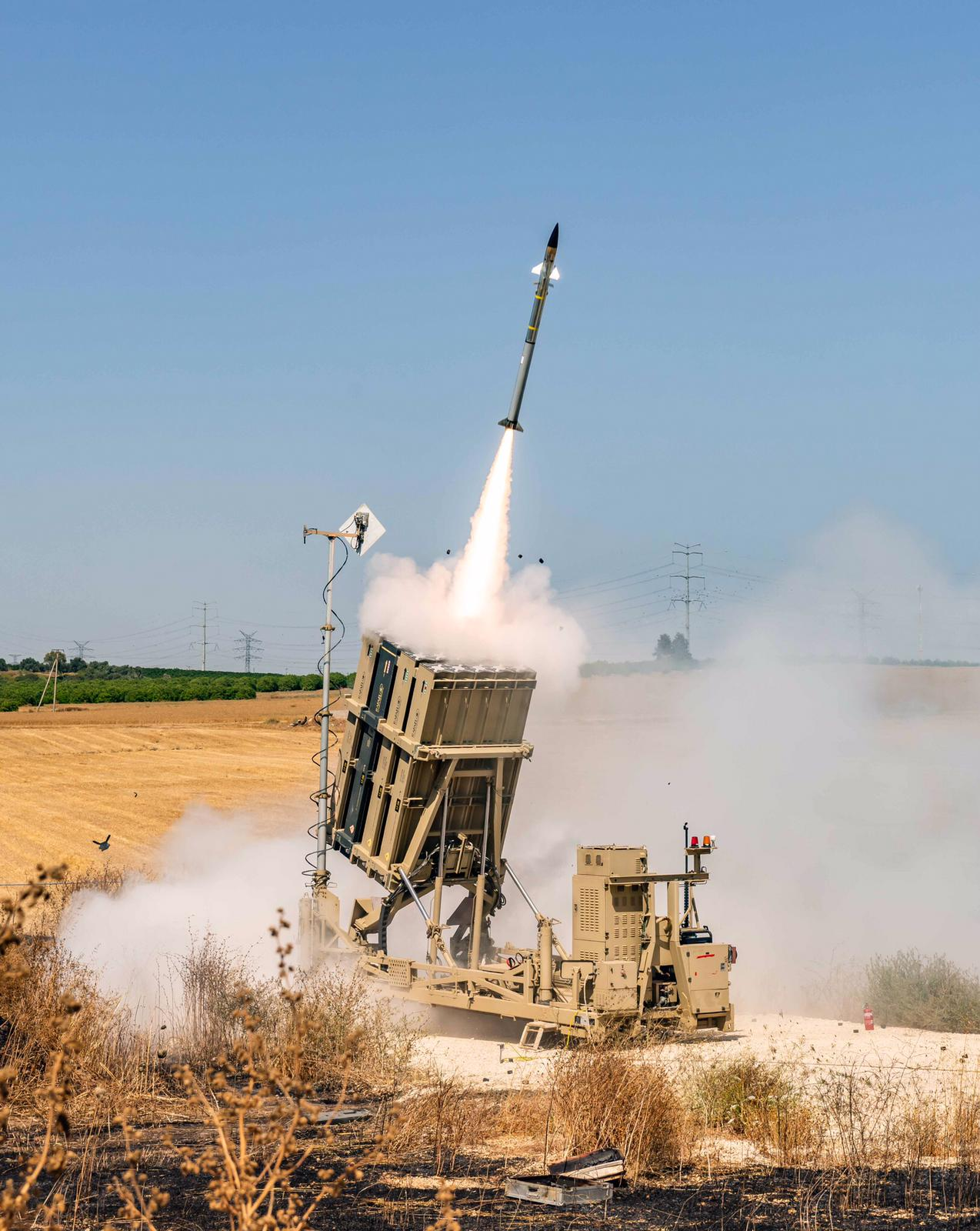
Rafael's Iron Dome air defense and C-RAM system

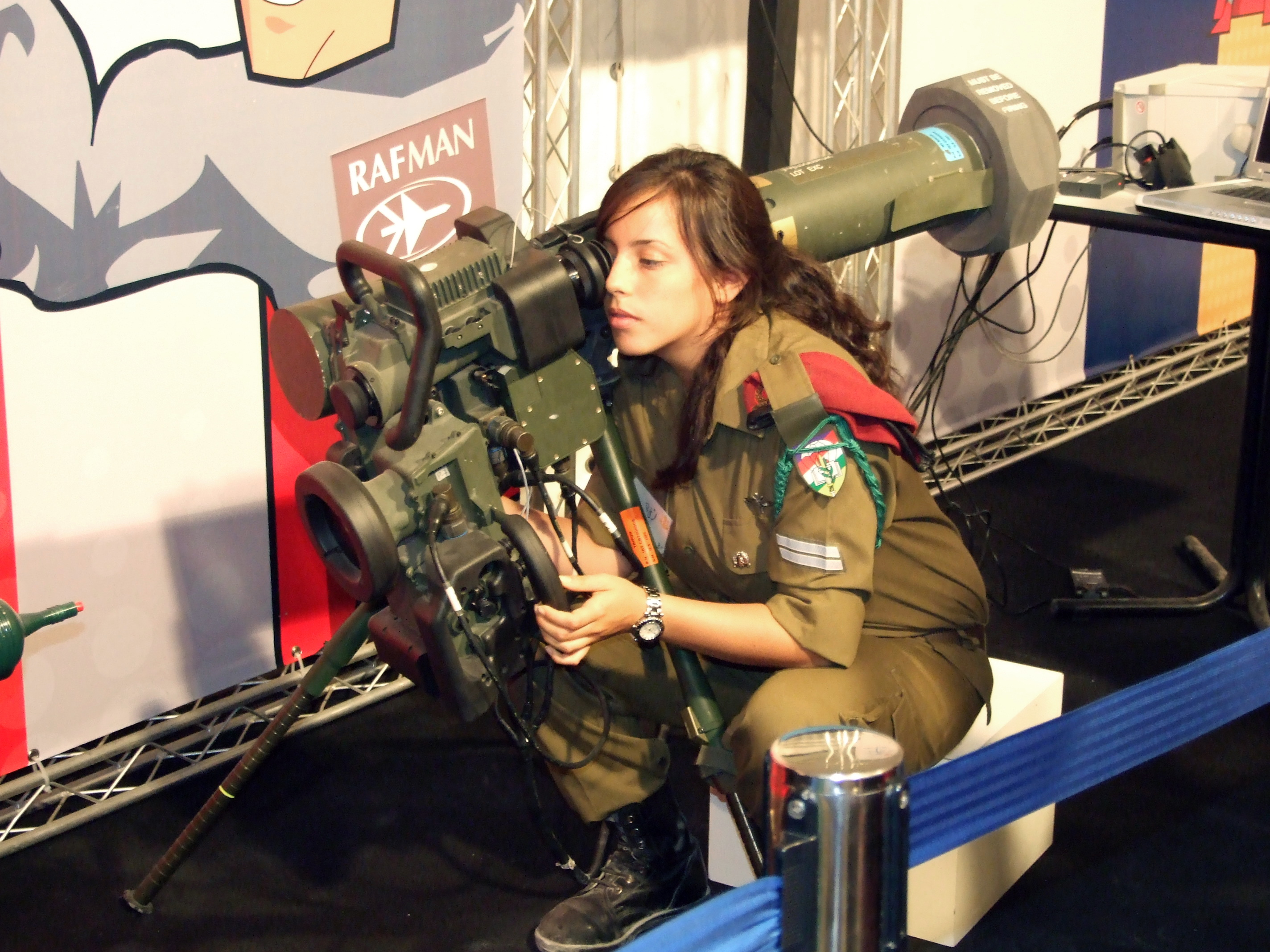
Israeli soldier with Spike anti-tank missile launcher

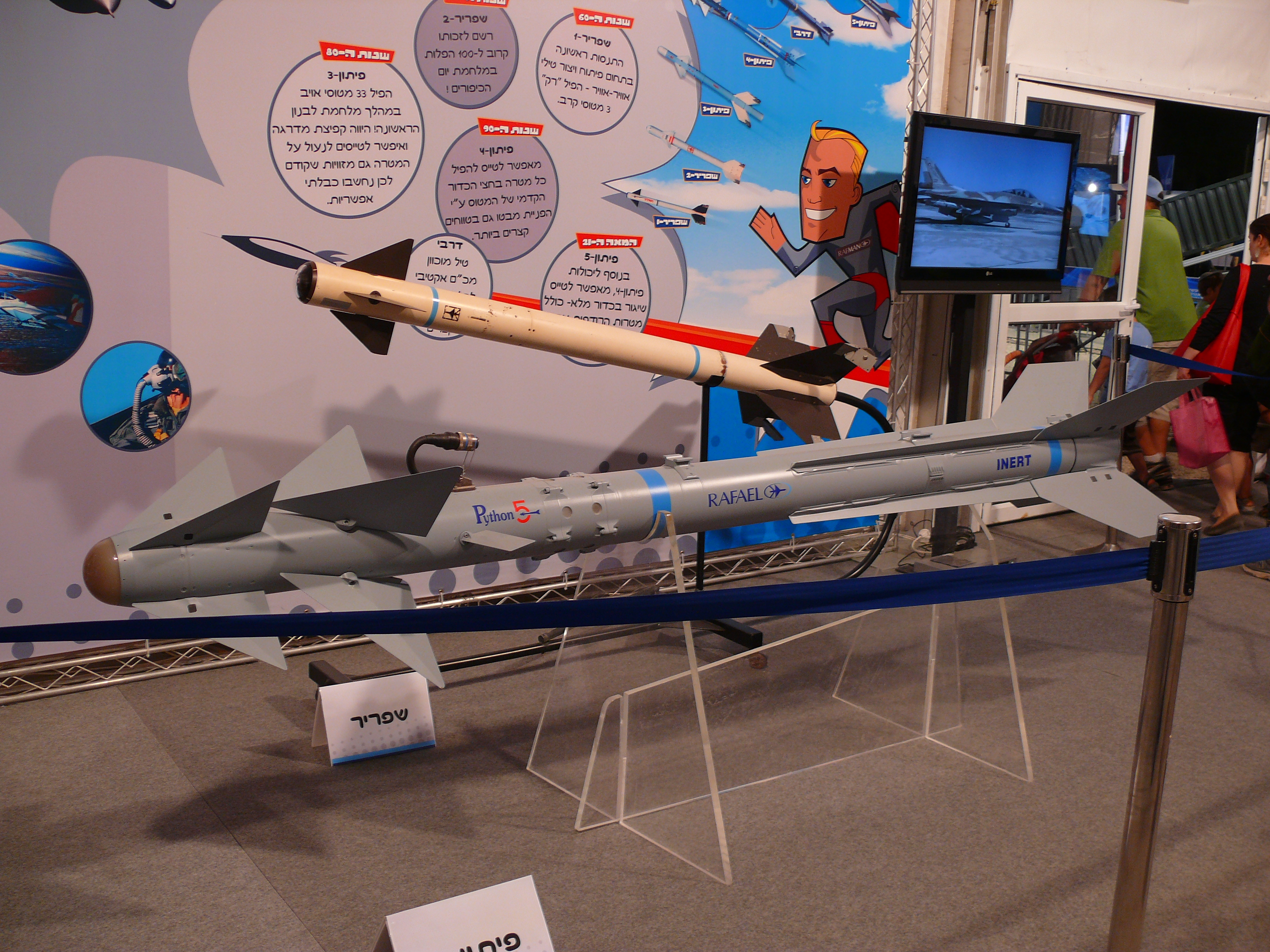
Python-5 (front) and Shafrir 1 (back) missiles

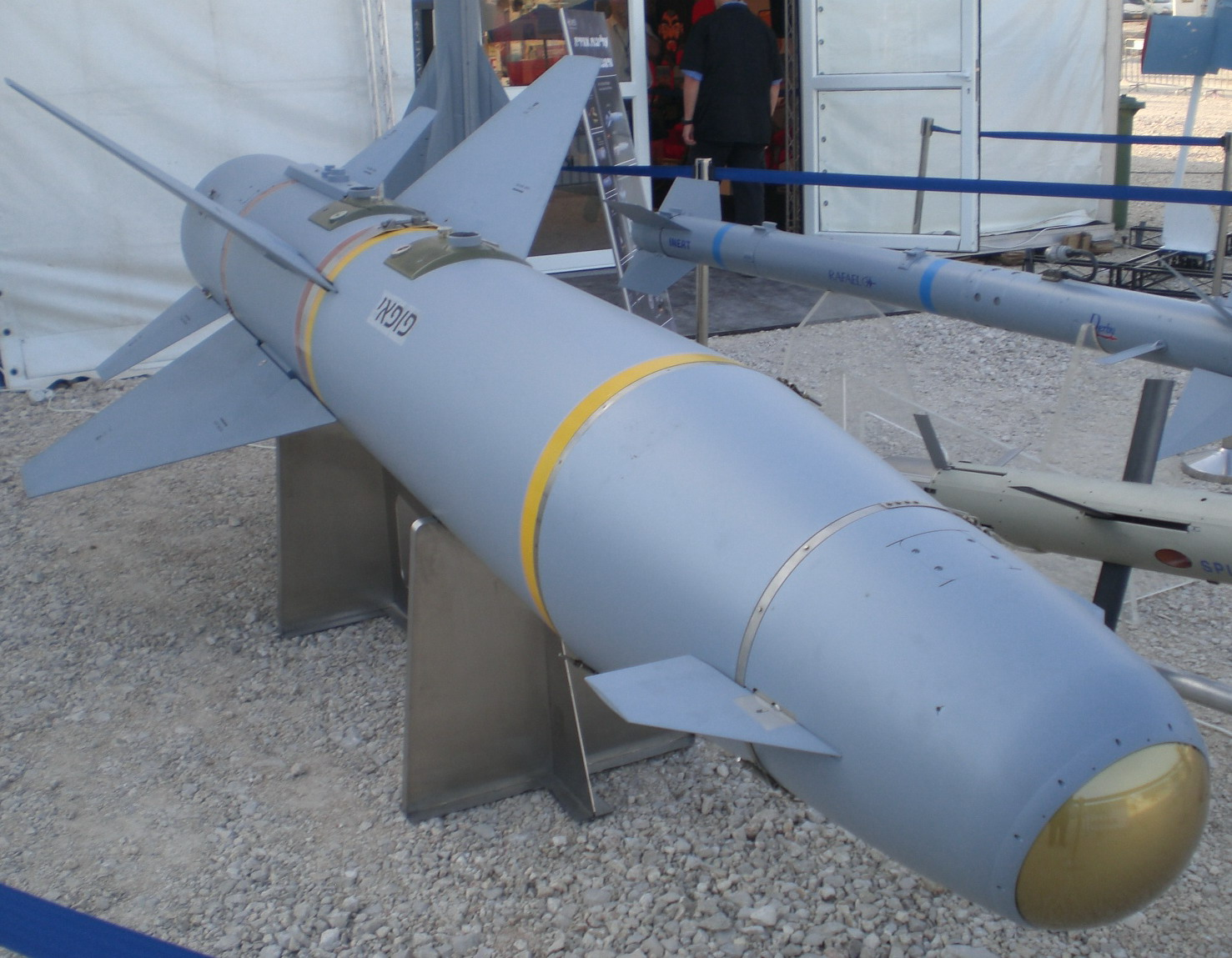
Popeye standoff missile

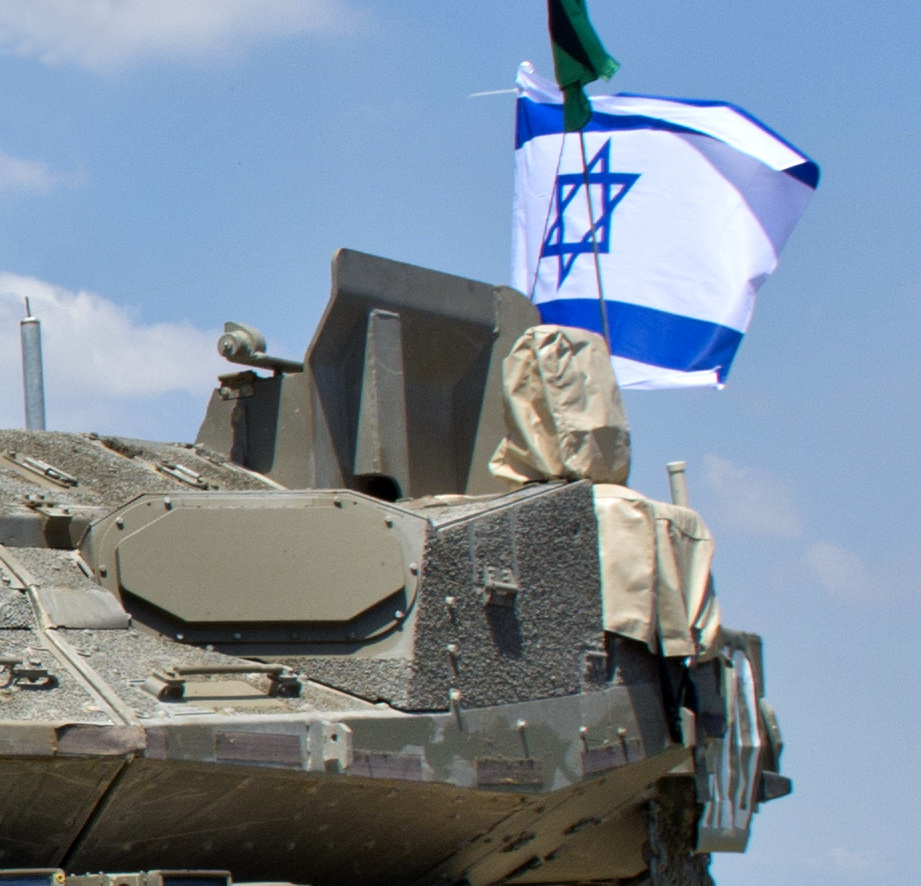
Rafael's Trophy active protection system, "Windbreaker", on an Israeli Merkava Mk IV main battle tank

Rafael was established in 1948 as the Science Corps (Hebrew: חיל המדע, known by the acronym HEMED, Hebrew: חמד) under the leadership of Shlomo Gur. It was renamed the Research and Design Directorate (אגף הפיתוח והתיכנון) in 1952. In 1952 David Ben-Gurion decided to split the activities of HEMED into two agencies. The pure scientific research was left with HEMED, while the development of weapons was placed into the new EMET agency.

In 1954 Ben-Gurion decided to change the name of EMET to RAFAEL (Hebrew: רשות לפיתוח אמצעי לחימה, lit. 'Armament Development Authority'). It was reorganized as Rafael in 1958.

In 1995, Yitzhak Rabin asked Amos Horev to become chairman of the board of Rafael, following many years in which Horev had served as chairman of Rafael's advisory committee. Horev served as chairman until January 2001.

=== Restructuring as a limited company ===
During the early 1990s Rafael was operating at a loss (peaking in 1995, with a loss of $120 million on a turnover of $460 million). Therefore, it was decided to restructure the organization and start operating Rafael as a company. Initially the new company had three discrete divisions, each operating as a profit center, with a separate balance sheet presented to the newly formed management board.

The restructuring was completed in 2002 when Rafael was formally incorporated as a limited company (although still as a government-owned corporation), while maintaining its technological capabilities through an investment of about 10% of turnover in R&D programs. In its first year as a limited company, Rafael earned a $37 million profit on $830 million in sales. By 2016, Rafael reported annual net profits of 473 million ILS (roughly 130 million dollars), up 3%, compared with ILS 459 million in 2015. New orders in 2016 totaled ILS 10.7 billion, and sales amounted to ILS 8.32 billion, 6% more than in 2015. The company's orders backlog as of the end of 2016 was ILS 21.72 billion, 12% more than at the end of 2015.

On 14 October 2007, the company changed its name from Rafael Armament Development Authority Ltd. to Rafael Advanced Defense Systems Ltd.

In 2022, Rafael acquired Pearson Engineering Ltd., an armored vehicle manufacturer based at the Armstrong Works in Newcastle, England, for approximately £100 million, as part of its expansion into the UK.

== Notable products ==
- Python – an air-to-air missiles system.
- Spike – a fourth generation fire-and-forget anti-tank guided missile
- Popeye – an air-to-ground missile system.
  - Popeye Turbo SLCM – believed to be a nuclear-tipped submarine-launched cruise missile
- Iron Beam – laser missile defense system
- Iron Dome – an air defense system to intercept short-range rockets and artillery shells
- TROPHY– an active protection system for armored vehicles.
- Protector USV – an unmanned surface vehicle (unmanned, autonomous naval combat system)
- David's Sling – surface-to-air missile system.

== Civilian technology transfer ==
In 1993, Rafael Development Corporation (RDC), a technology transfer company, was established as a joint venture with Elron Electronic Industries; in order to commercialize applications based on defense technologies for medical devices, telecommunications, and semiconductor industries. The company established and developed several companies including:

- Given Imaging – focusing on capsule endoscopy technologies.
- Oramir Semiconductor Equipment – a developer of laser cleaning technologies for the semiconductor industry, sold to Applied Materials in 2001 for $21 million.
- Starling Advanced Communications (TASE:STLG) – a provider of broadband wireless networking solutions for airliners.
- Galil Medical – a developer of cryotherapy solutions.
- SELA Semiconductor Engineering Laboratories – a provider of automated sample preparation tools for semiconductor manufacturers, sold to Camtek Intelligent Imaging.
- 3DV Systems – developers of the ZCam, a time-of-flight camera products for video applications, sold to Microsoft.
- Medingo – developer of a micro pump insulin delivery system consists of two parts: a semi-disposable insulin dispensing patch and a remote control, which allows for discreet personalized insulin delivery. The company was sold to Hoffmann-La Roche's subsidiary Roche Diagnostics for $160 million as well as up to $40 million in milestone payments.

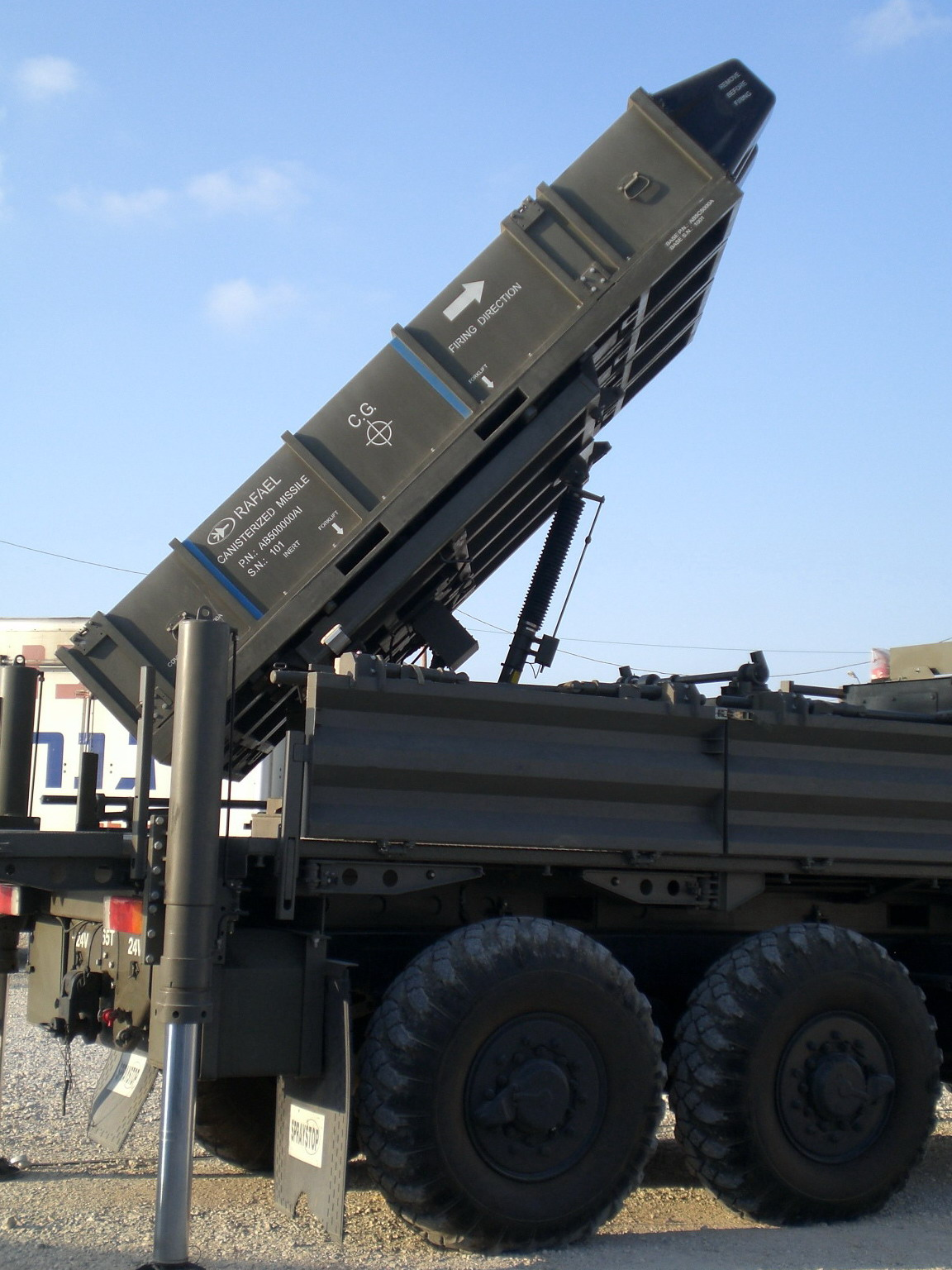
SPYDER launcher

== Products ==
- Air Defense systems
  - Iron Dome
    - Tamir, missile used by Iron Dome
    - C-Dome (the naval version of Iron Dome)
  - MIC4AD
  - SPYDER
  - David's Sling
  - Drone Dome
  - Iron Beam
  - SkySonic
- Air to Air missiles
  - Python-5
  - I-Derby
  - I-Derby ER
  - Sky Sting
- Air to Surface missile
  - SPARROW family
  - Rocks Family, unveiled in February 2019.

Guided Bombs

  - Spice (bomb) Family
- Electronic Warfare Systems
  - SKY SHIELD Escort Jamming pod
  - C-GEM Active Offboard Decoy
- Precision Guided missiles
  - SPIKE ER
  - SPIKE LR
  - SPIKE NLOS
  - Sea Breaker
- Missile upgrade kits
  - Electro-optical Precision Integration Kit (EPIK)
- Active Protection System
  - TROPHY an active armor protection system, "Windbreaker" (Hebrew: מעיל רוח)
- Remote-controlled weapon station
  - Rafael OWS (nicknamed "MAG Rafael" by the IDF)
  - Samson RCWS (Israeli name: Katlanit (קטלנית, "lethal")
  - Typhoon Weapon Station for naval applications and military ships
- Demining Systems
  - Rafael Carpet

== 2026 partial privatisation and IPO ==
The long-standing debate over the state’s role in Israel’s defense industry reached a turning point in January 2026, when the government formalized a timeline to partially privatize Rafael Advanced Defense Systems through an initial public offering (IPO) on the Tel Aviv Stock Exchange. This transition represents a significant evolution for this company, as it began as a national laboratory, and was only incorporated as a state-owned enterprise in 2002. The decision follows years of internal pressure from Rafael’s leadership, who argued that its fully state-owned status created a "bureaucratic glass ceiling," making it harder to compete for elite engineering talent and respond to global market shifts as nimbly as its publicly traded rivals, Elbit Systems and IAI.

=== Implementation and valuation challenges ===
The roadmap for this transition became clear on 12 January 2026, when Roi Kahlon, director of the Government Companies Authority, confirmed that the government would seek to float a 25% to 30% minority stake as early as the second quarter of 2026.

Unlike other defense firms, Rafael’s path to the stock market is uniquely complicated by its deep integration with the Ministry of Defense and the highly classified nature of its flagship technologies. Establishing a public valuation has historically been stalled by the difficulty of sharing detailed financial data for "proprietary" systems, such as the Iron Dome and the newly deployed Iron Beam laser interceptor, without compromising national security.

Supported by a record-high order backlog of $18 billion, Rafael’s valuation at the time of the announcement was estimated at approximately $10 billion. This financial strength is largely a result of the global "battle-proven" reputation of its air defense portfolio, which has seen increased demand from international partners like Germany and Finland. To balance the needs of private investors with the imperatives of the state, the Israeli government intends to retain a controlling interest and release shares in a series of small, staggered tranches through 2027, ensuring that Rafael remains a strategic asset while gaining the operational flexibility of a public company.

== See also ==
- Elbit (El-Op)
- Israel Aircraft Industries (IAI)
- Israel Military Industries
- Israel Shipyards
- Military equipment of Israel
- Soltam
