= Oster (surname) =

Oster is a surname. Notable people with the surname include:

- Adalbert Oster (born 1944), Romanian sports shooter
- Al Oster (1924–2017), Canadian singer
- Benedikt Oster (born 1988), German politician
- Bill Oster (1933–2020), American baseball pitcher
- Christian Oster (born 1949), French writer
- Dan Oster (born 1981), American actor and comedian
- Daniel Oster (1938–1999), French writer
- Eitan Oster (2001–2024), Israel Defense Forces officer
- Emily Oster (born 1980), American economist and academic, daughter of Sharon
- Ernst Oster (1908–1977), German pianist, musicologist and music theorist
- George Oster (1940–2018), American mathematical biologist
- Grigoriy Oster (born 1947), Russian author and screenwriter
- Hans Oster (1887–1945), German World War II general and resistance figure
- Harry Oster (1923–2001), American folklorist and musicologist
- Heinrich Oster (1878–1954), German chemist, businessman and war criminal
- Jack Oster (1902–1956), British rugby footballer
- Jeff Oster (born 1957), American New Age musician
- Jeffrey W. Oster, US Marine Corps lieutenant general
- Jennifer Oster (born 1986), German footballer
- Jerry Oster (1943–2020), American writer
- John Oster (born 1978), British football player and coach
- Josef Oster (born 1971), German politician
- Louis Oster (1928–2023), French lawyer
- Marcel Oster (born 1989), German luger
- Megan Oster (born 1989), American figure skater
- Pierre Oster (1933–2020), French poet
- Shai Oster, American journalist
- Sharon Oster (1948–2022), American economist and academic
- Stefan Oster (born 1965), German Catholic bishop

== See also ==
- Sara Mathilde Øster (born 1973), Danish artist
