= Light Blade =

Israeli laser weapon system

- Type: Laser air defense system
- Place of origin: Israel

Service history
- Used by: Israel Border Police
- Wars: Gaza–Israel conflict

Production history
- Designer: OptiDefense
- Designed: 2010–2015
- Manufacturer: OptiDefense

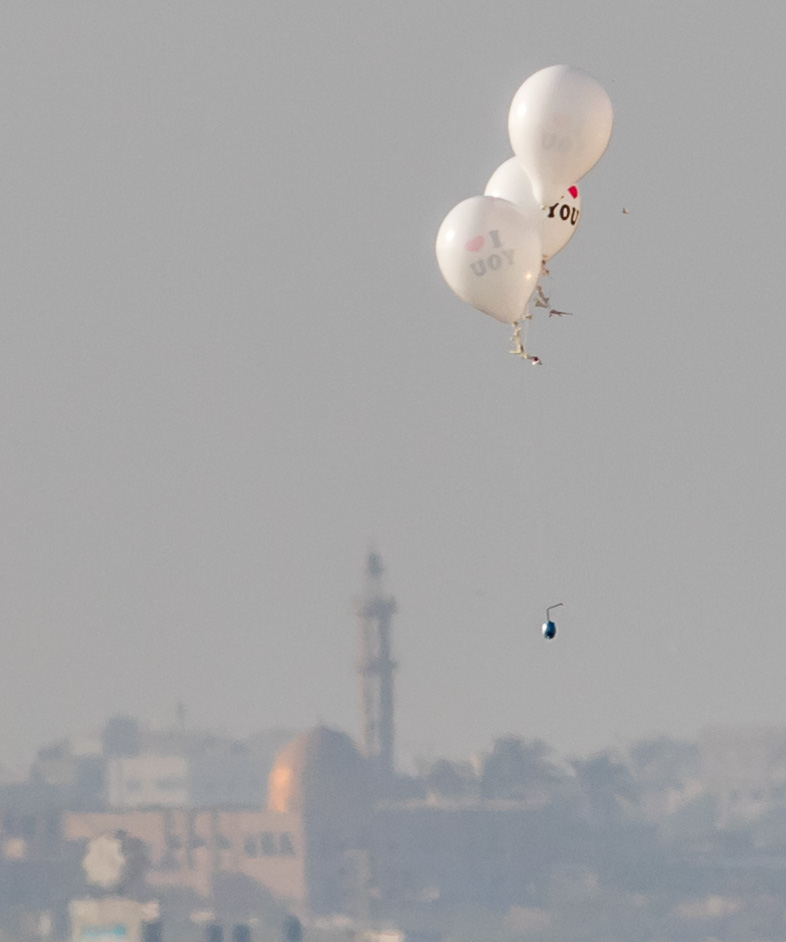
Helium balloons bearing flammable materials launched from Bureij in the Gaza Strip

Light Blade (Hebrew: להב אור, Lahav Or) is a laser-based air defense system intended to intercept airborne devices such as incendiary balloons, incendiary kites, and miniature UAVs such as quadcopters, and RAM (rocket, artillery, and mortar) threats. When first deployed in 2020, it was the first laser air defense system in the world.

== Development ==
Development was driven by the need for a cheaper missile defense alternative to the Iron Dome.

The system is based on research involving engineers from Ben-Gurion University, the Israel Police, and the Research and Development Directorate of the Israel Defense Forces. Israel Border Police commission Yaakov Shabtai oversaw the system's development. It was officially revealed in 2019, with a claimed effective range of 2 km (1.2 mi). Cost per interception is approximately US$3.50; cost per interception by Iron Dome was estimated at $100,000–150,000 in 2020.

== Operational history ==
Light Blade was deployed operationally for the first time in August 2020 by Israel Border Police in response to the launch of incendiary devices, such as explosive-laden balloons from parts of the Gaza Strip, that caused brush fires in southern Israel. The Sky Spotter system had been developed to spot and track balloons and kites and direct firefighters to their landing spots without delay, but there had been no way to intercept balloons. Light Blade succeeded with almost 100% of interceptions, but because of its short range balloons sent by Hamas from other areas of the Gaza Strip were not intercepted.

== See also ==
- DragonFire (UK, range classified)
- Iron Beam (Israel, range 7 km (4.3 mi))
