= Rafael Carpet =

- Type: Mine Breaching System
- Place of origin: Israel

Service history
- In service: 2006–present
- Used by: Israeli Army, French Army

Production history
- Designer: Rafael Advanced Defense Systems
- Manufacturer: Rafael Advanced Defense Systems

Specifications
- Mass: 3.5 tons (fully loaded)
- Diameter: 265 mm (rocket)
- Main armament: Up to 20 x 265 mm rockets

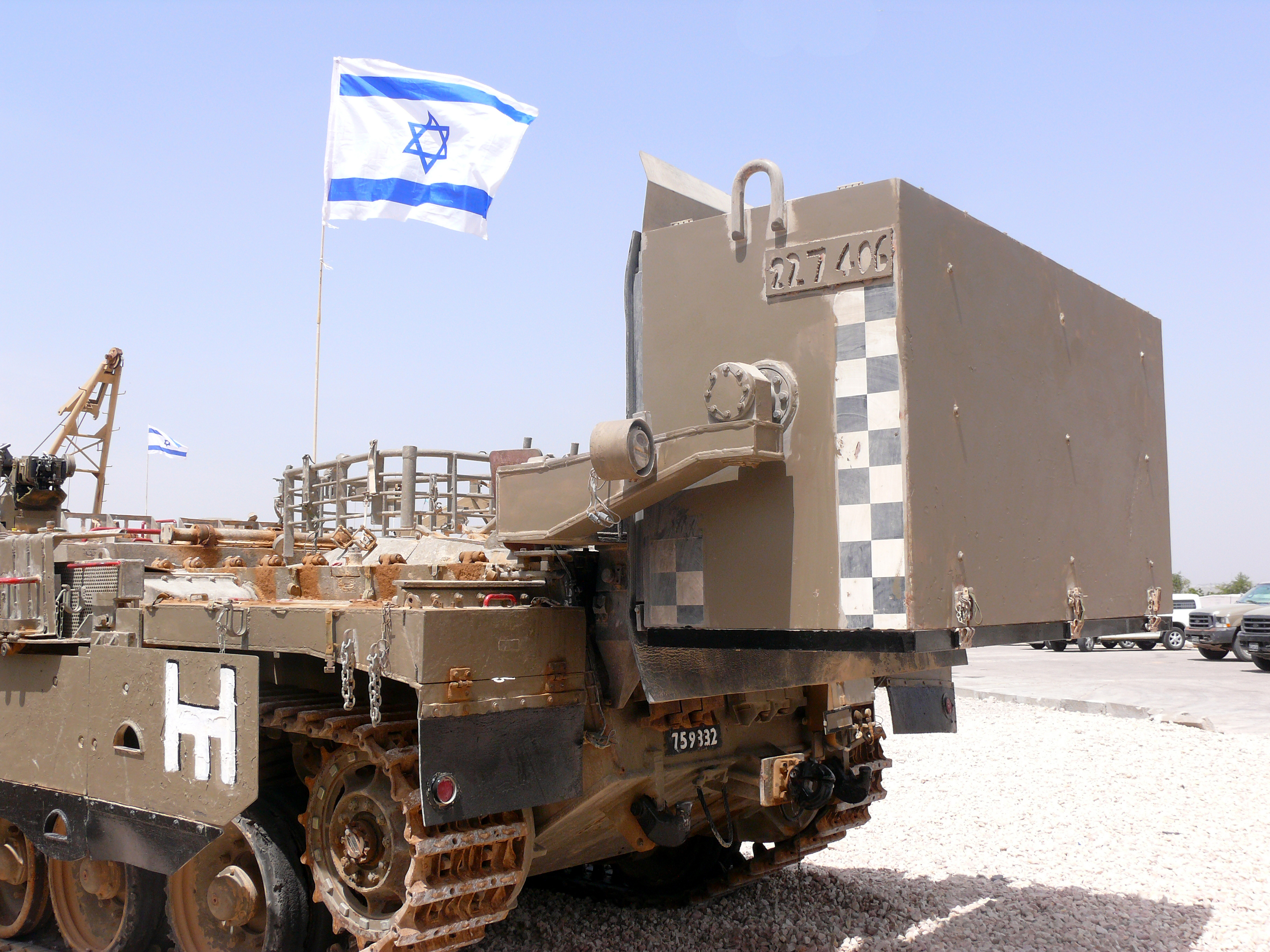
CARPET anti-mine rockets installed on IDF Puma

Rafael Carpet is a mine breaching system developed by Rafael Advanced Defense Systems, an Israeli weapon development company. First introduced in 2006, it has been adopted by the Israel Defense Forces and was scheduled to be fielded with the French Army by 2007. The system employs a unique implementation of fuel-air explosive (FAE) technology, offering an efficient and safe method for clearing minefields and neutralizing IEDs.

== Background ==
The primary function of Carpet is to clear a safe passage through minefields, enabling the safe movement of combat vehicles. It operates by firing a salvo of up to 20 rockets, which disperse a fuel spray over the target area. This creates a fuel-air explosive cloud that, upon detonation, generates a strong impulse over a wide area. This impulse is effective in triggering most mines, regardless of the terrain, foliage, or man-made obstacles. The explosion clears a path up to 100 meters long within one minute, providing a significant operational advantage in minefield clearance.

Rafael Carpet can be operated in various modes including automatic, semi-automatic, and manual, offering operational flexibility. It is designed to be remotely operated from within a vehicle, protecting the crew from enemy fire. This system can also be reloaded rapidly in forward areas, enhancing its utility in combat scenarios. Notably, the rockets used in Carpet contain only liquid fuel, which is flammable but not explosive under regular operating conditions, reducing the risk to the system, vehicle, and nearby troops.

The system is notable for its relatively lightweight design, with the fully loaded Carpet launcher weighing 3.5 tons. It can carry up to 20 x 265 mm rockets, each weighing 46 kg. Training rockets, which simulate the operation without the fuel-air explosion, are also available for safe training exercises. Carpet can be towed, mounted on the rear of armored fighting vehicles, or installed inside an armored personnel carrier (APC). It has been used by the Israeli Combat Engineering Corps mounted on an IDF Puma combat engineering vehicle.

One of the significant deployments of Rafael Carpet was by the IDF during the Second Lebanon War, where it was used for neutralizing and clearing Hezbollah strongholds near the Israeli-Lebanese border. It has also been used in the Gaza war. The French Army's plan to incorporate the Carpet system involves its installation on AMX-B2 EBG combat engineering vehicles, which are designed to deploy various mine clearing systems, adding versatility to their capabilities.
