= Sky Shield =

Israeli electronic warfare pod

Sky Shield is an advanced airborne electronic warfare system for fighter jets developed by Rafael Advanced Defense Systems of Israel.

Sky Shield Electronic Warfare System

The electronic warfare pod is an all-inclusive multi-purpose escort jammer and electronic attack system. Sky Shield engages enemy radars in hostile environments, providing comprehensive electronic countermeasures against enemy threats. The system creates a corridor for multiple attacking aircraft, thus increasing aircraft survivability in time and providing attack options. The Sky Shield pod covers the frequency spectrum range from D band to Ku band and includes a digital interferometer system for signal detection, a DRFM-based technique generator and a modular solid-state active electronically scanned array transmitter for jamming.

The system was purchased by the Brazilian Air Force in 2006 for its AMX A-1 fighter aircraft for SEAD missions.

In February 2022, Rafael announced finalization of the development and conduction of flight testing of a new generation of Sky Shield for an undisclosed customer.
