= Eitan Oster =

Israel Defense Forces officer

- איתן יצחק אוסטר
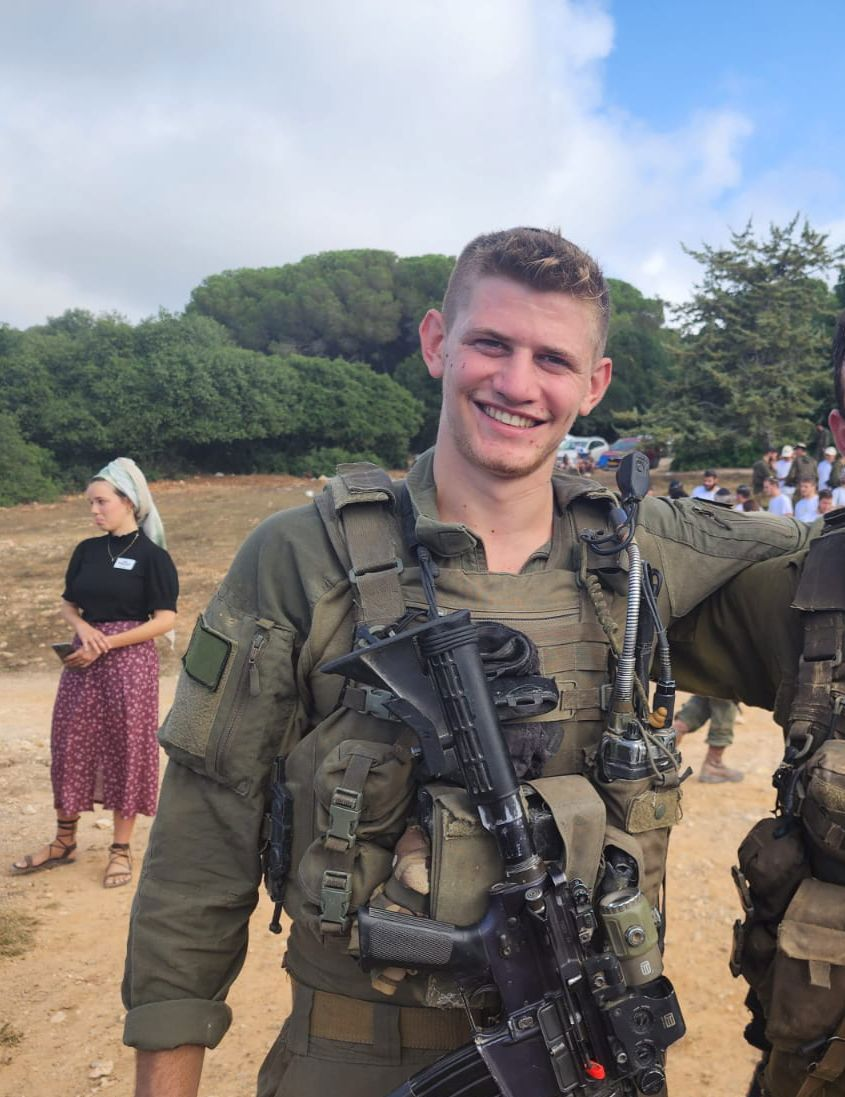
- Born: December 21, 2001; Modi'in-Maccabim-Re'ut, Israel
- Died: October 2, 2024 (aged 22); Adaisseh, Lebanon
- Burial place: Mount Herzl, Jerusalem
- Military career
- Allegiance: Israel
- Branch: Israel Defense Forces
- Service years: 2020–2024
- Rank: Captain
- Unit: Egoz unit
- Known for: Namesake of the Iron Beam laser defense system "Or Eitan"
- Conflicts: Israel–Hezbollah conflict
- Awards: Commendation Medal (Israel)

Eitan Yitzhak Oster (איתן יצחק אוסטר; December 21, 2001 – October 2, 2024) was an Israel Defense Forces officer in the Egoz reconnaissance unit of the Commando Brigade. He was killed in action during the Battle of Al-Aadaissah in southern Lebanon and became the first Israeli casualty during the ground operation in Lebanon during the Israel–Hezbollah conflict.

Following his death, Israel's Ministry of Defense named its laser air defense system "Or Eitan" ("Eitan's Light") in his memory.

== Early life and education ==
Oster was born in Re'ut, a neighborhood of Modi'in-Maccabim-Re'ut, the seventh of eight children. He attended the Netiv Zvulun elementary school and the Amit Modiin religious high school. After graduation, he studied for a year at the Machanayim Hesder Yeshiva in Gush Etzion. As a youth, he was a member and counselor in the Bnei Akiva youth movement.

== Military service ==
Oster was drafted into the Israel Defense Forces in November 2020, joining the Egoz reconnaissance unit of the Commando Brigade. During his training, he was recognized as an outstanding cadet.

In 2022 he attended the IDF Officers' Course and graduated in February 2023 from the Lahav track with honors. He subsequently served as a platoon commander for new recruits in Egoz and later commanded an operational team. In August 2023, he received the Commando Brigade's Outstanding Officer Award.

Throughout 2024, Oster took part in several covert operations in southern Lebanon, near the village of Al-Aadaissah. On September 30, 2024, the IDF launched a ground maneuver in Lebanon as part of Operation Northern Arrows, with Oster's team among the first to cross the border.

On the night of October 2, 2024, while leading his team to secure an observation position in Adaisseh, they encountered a Hezbollah cell, sparking close-quarters combat. Oster was wounded in the chest but continued to command and evacuate his men under fire. He was later evacuated to Misgav Am and then by helicopter, where he was pronounced dead due to blood loss. He was the first Israeli soldier killed in the Lebanon ground operation of the war.

== Commemoration ==
After his death, Oster's family established the nonprofit organization Ruach Eitan ("Eitan's Spirit"), which promotes his values of leadership, excellence, and responsibility among Israeli youth and soldiers.

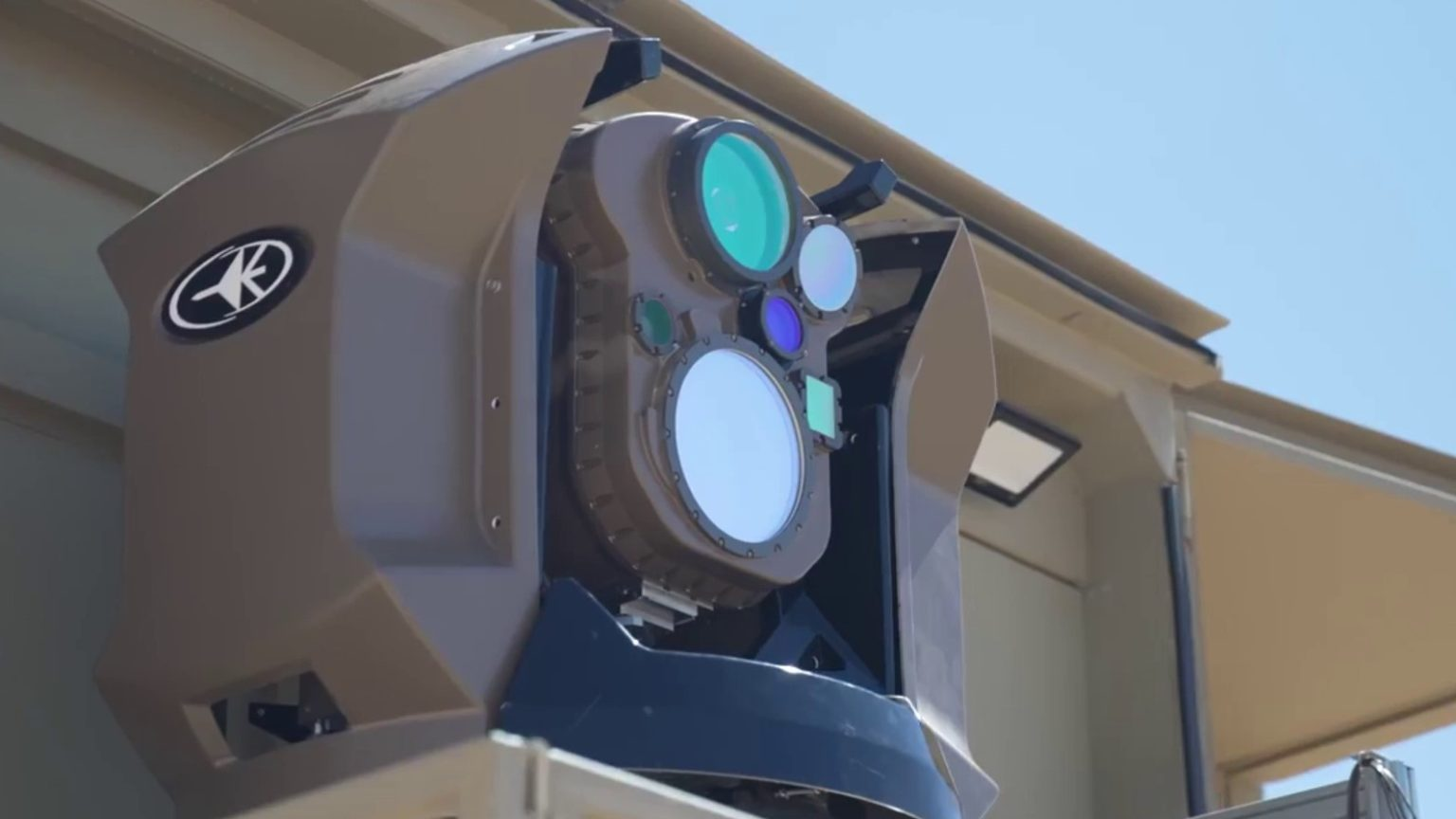
Or Eitan, the Israeli Laser air defense system

In January 2025, a path in Modi'in-Maccabim-Re'ut was named in his memory.

A lookout point in Neve Daniel was also inaugurated in his honor.

In September 2025, the Israeli Ministry of Defense unveiled the advanced laser interception system "Or Eitan", named after him, developed partly by his father, engineer Dov Oster.
