= SkySonic =

Israeli missile interceptor for hypersonic threats

SkySonic (also written Sky Sonic; Hebrew: קלע חד) is a two-stage missile interceptor under development by Israeli defense company Rafael Advanced Defense Systems. It is designed to intercept maneuvering hypersonic weapons, including hypersonic glide vehicles, hypersonic cruise missiles and maneuvering ballistic missiles. The system was first unveiled in June 2023 at the Paris Air Show.

== Development ==
On 14 June 2023, Rafael announced the development of Sky Sonic, a dedicated interceptor intended to counter maneuvering hypersonic missiles. The announcement preceded the system's presentation at the Paris Air Show, held later that month at Paris–Le Bourget Airport in France.

According to Rafael, development had begun around 2020 as an internally funded project in response to the growing threat posed by hypersonic weapons. The company described the interceptor as a system specifically intended to address the challenges of detecting, tracking and intercepting high-speed targets capable of changing their flight trajectories. The project was also presented to the United States Missile Defense Agency with the approval of the Israeli Ministry of Defense.

In September 2025, Rafael published an updated technical brochure detailing SkySonic's two-stage configuration, propulsion system, maneuverability and intended target types. The company also described its compatibility with existing radar and tracking systems, allowing integration into established air defense infrastructure.

In October 2026, Rafael displayed a full-scale model of Sky Sonic at the Association of the United States Army (AUSA) Annual Meeting and Exposition in Washington, D.C., alongside other air and missile defense systems developed by the company.

== Design and capabilities ==
=== Interceptor design ===
SkySonic is designed as a two-stage interceptor consisting of a rocket booster and a smaller, highly maneuverable terminal interception vehicle, commonly referred to as a kill vehicle. According to Rafael, the latter is equipped with a solid-propellant rocket motor and uses advanced energy management and guidance algorithms to pursue and intercept high-speed targets.

The interceptor is designed to maneuver at high altitudes within the atmosphere using aerodynamic control surfaces. Its guidance and maneuvering capabilities are intended to allow it to adjust its flight path in response to changes in the trajectory of an incoming hypersonic threat.

Rafael states that the system is intended to counter several categories of maneuvering threats, including hypersonic glide vehicles, hypersonic cruise missiles, and maneuvering short-range and medium-range ballistic missiles. The company has also described the interceptor as capable of engaging threats traveling at speeds of around Mach 10.

SkySonic is designed to operate with existing radar and tracking systems rather than requiring a dedicated radar. According to Rafael, this compatibility is intended to simplify integration into existing missile defense networks and reduce the costs associated with deploying the system.

=== Interception method ===
According to reporting published in 2023, Sky Sonic was designed to intercept hypersonic threats at altitudes of approximately 20–70 km, where the effectiveness of conventional air defense and higher-altitude missile interception systems may be limited.

The interceptor is intended to destroy incoming missiles either through a direct impact with the target or through the detonation of a warhead in its vicinity. Following separation from the booster, the terminal interception vehicle is designed to maneuver toward a calculated interception point, using its guidance and control systems to engage the incoming threat.

Rafael's 2025 technical brochure describes maneuvering hypersonic threats as typically operating at altitudes of 30–70 km. The interceptor is intended to operate in this high-altitude environment, combining maneuverability, propulsion and targeting capabilities to engage threats following non-ballistic flight paths.

== See also ==
- David's Sling
- Arrow (missile family)
- Missile defense
- Hypersonic weapon
