= SS Oster =

1908 Norwegian steamship

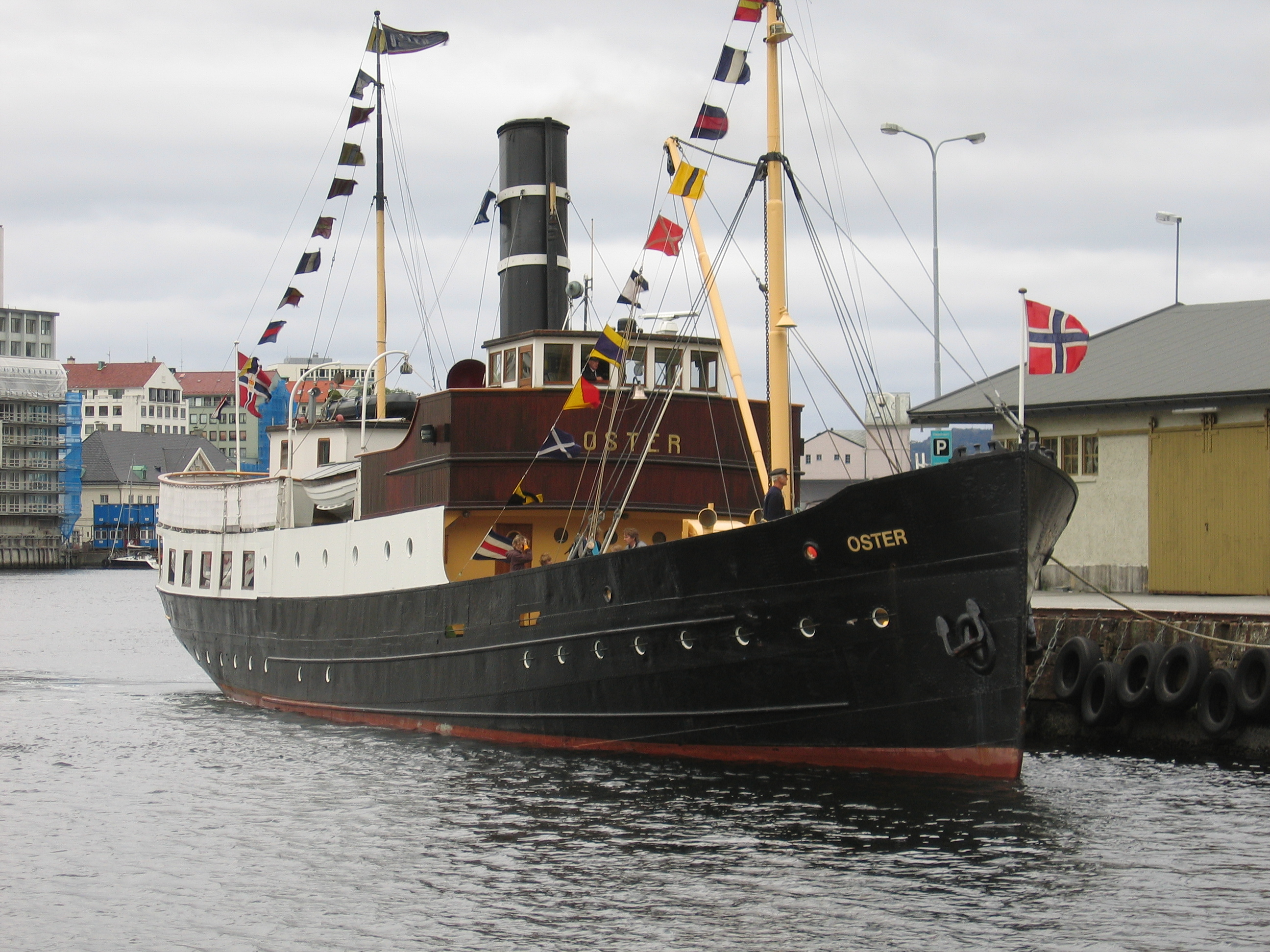
- SS Oster in Bergen, 2005

History
- Name: 1908 to May 1940, Oster; May 1940 to 1945, Marder; 1945 to 1965, Oster; 1965 to March 1996, Vaka; March 1996 to July 2000, Gamle Oster; July 2000 onwards, Oster
- Owner: 1908 to 1923, Indre Nordhordlandske Dampskibsselskab (INDS); 1923 to 1939, Indre Nordhordland Dampbåtlag AS (INDL); Requisitioned: 1939 to May 1940, Royal Norwegian Navy; Requisitioned: May 1940 to 1945, Deutsche Kriegsmarine (the German Navy); 1945 to 1964, Indre Nordhordland Dampbåtlag AS; 1964 to June 1974, Berge Sag & Trelast Forretning (Brødrene Berge Ølensvåg); June 1974 to August 1998, Oddmund Tjoflot; August 1988 to March 1996, Partrederiet Kristoffersen & Gundersen, March 1996 to present Nordhordland Veteranbåtlag
- Operator: Owner
- Port of registry: Norway
- Builder: Christianssands Mekaniske Værksted
- Yard number: 131
- Laid down: 1908
- Launched: 1908
- Christened: Oster
- Completed: 1908
- Identification: IMO number: 5266386; MMSI number: 257282500; Callsign: LEPF
- Status: Operational

General characteristics
- Type: Passenger / cargo ship
- Tonnage: 167 GRT as built
- Length: 106.1 ft (32.3 m) as built; 118.6 ft (36.1 m) after being lengthened in 1915
- Installed power: Coal-fired steam (1908–1964); Diesel (1964–c.1996); Steam (c.1996–)
- Speed: 10 knots (19 km/h; 12 mph)
- Capacity: 100 passengers

SS Oster is a Norwegian steamship built in 1908 by Christianssands Mekaniske Værksted for the Indre Nordhordlandske Dampskibsselskab to provide a combined passenger and cargo service between Bergen and Osterfjorden in Norway. During World War II she served as a guard ship with both the Royal Norwegian Navy and later with the German Kriegsmarine. Following the war she returned to civilian service and is still in service providing pleasure cruises from Bergen. In 1963 the Bergen deaf priest Ragnvald Hammer wrote the poem " Dar kjem dampen" in honor of the ship. Norwegian folksinger Ivar Medaas later added a tune to this poem.

== Construction ==
In 1906 the residents of the municipality of Modalen in Hordaland in Norway sent a letter to the steam company in charge of the route into Modalen asking if they could provide a service that would go as far as possible north so that local people would not be isolated from the world, particularly during winter when the fjord was iced up. In response the Indre Nordhordland Dampskipsselskap of Bergen (which subsequently changed its name in 1923 to Indre Nordhordland Dampbaatlag LL) commissioned in early 1908 Christianssands Mek. Verksted of Kristiansand to build the steel-hulled 167 gt Oster. Upon her launch in November 1908 she was 106.1 ft (32.3 m) long and had a beam of 21.7 ft (6.6 m)and a depth of 9.7 ft (3.0 m) She could accommodate 265 passengers and was fitted with a 54 bhp coal-fired triple-expansion steam engine.

== Service history ==
Following her launch she sailed to Bergen, arriving on 29 November 1908, from where she soon commenced a service between Bergen and Osterfjorden with passengers and cargo. The first captain was Tobias Andersen Hordvik. While designed to take 265 passengers, during the summer holiday she often carried over 300.

In 1915 she was rebuilt and lengthened to 118.6 ft (36.1 m) by Mjellem & Karlsen in Bergen which allowed her to take 312 passengers. This change increased her gross tonnage to 191 gt. The rebuilding also saw her fitted with electric lighting, making her one of the first ships in the Northern part of Norway to have this feature. The Oster was rebuilt between 1928 and 1932. Oster continued providing a passenger and cargo service along the Norwegian coast until 1939.

=== World War II ===
Following the onset of World War II in September 1939 she was requisitioned by the Royal Norwegian Navy who installed a 76 mm gun on her front deck and assigned her to the 2 sjøforsvarsdistrikt, 13 bevokningsdivisjon (2nd maritime defence district, 13 guarding division) with a crew of 18 under a command of Captain L. Sommer. On the evening of 8 April 1940 she was ordered to patrol the southern part of Hjeltefjord, between Ramsøy and Kalvanes.

On 9 January 1940 while patrolling between Ramsøy and Kalvanes under the command of Reidar Fladmark she was heavily damaged in a collision with the cargo ship Ek. Oster was able to return to Bergen at slow speed for repairs.

Following the commencement of the German invasion of Denmark and Norway in April 1940 the Oster was sent to Blomvåg to operate in an intelligence and communication role. She was then dispatched to Telavåg on 6 May 6, where she was abandoned by the navy.

Following the Nazi Germany occupation of Norway the German Kriegsmarine took her over in Telavåg on 22 May 1940, painted her grey and renamed her Marder, assigning her the pennant number NB04. She formally entered Kriegsmarine service on 24 May. By December 1940 the Kriegsmarine had fitted her with more guns and assigned her to patrol duties with the HafenschutzFlottille Bergen.

On 17 January 1941 at 12:00 am, the Marder ran aground on Kjeøfluen on the east side of Hjelma bear Alvø, a small island south of Fedje. She remained stranded until the 22 January when she was towed off and taken to Bergen where she was repaired at the Evje & Andersens Slip at Verftet.

On the 5 June 1941 she proceeded to rescue the crew from a Dornier Do 18 flying boat which had made an emergency landing at Holmengraa and took the aircraft in tow until passing the towing duties over to a Luftwaffe ship.

On 5 June 1943 the Marder responded to an attack by Norwegian Fairmile D class MGBs 620 and 626 in Korsfjord on the 8,132 gt cargo ship Altenfels carrying iron ore from Kirkenes south bound to Germany and escorted close astern by the German M-Class minesweeper M468. Hit by two torpedoes fired by MGB 626 the Altenfels was sinking by the time the Marder arrived to support M468 and the shore batteries to fire 55 shells from its 20 mm gun as it pursued the departing MGBs. MGB 626 escaped with her sister ship reaching its base at Lerwick in Scotland with two killed and five wounded.

During the spring of 1944 she was modified by removing her aft and front mast and installing a new "Unit mast" on the bridge. Her armament was also increased which saw her returning to service with a single 76 mm gun on the foredeck; a 37 mm gun on the cargo hatch; a 20 mm Madsen gun on the roof of the charthouse; a MG 34 machine gun on the bridge; and four depth charges. She was also given the new pennant number V5504, and assigned to the 55 Vorposten-Flottille whose headquarters was based at Stutzpunkt Florvaagbucht.

=== Post war service ===
At the end of the war she was abandoned by the Germans at Telavåg and subsequently returned to her owners, but was by then in very poor condition. With her original name restored to her, the Oster underwent an extensive maintenance and modernization at Storemollens Mek Verksted, in Sandviken, Bergen. She was again rebuilt in 1950. As the only coal-powered steamer left in Bergen, Oster became a symbol of the old fjord steamers on the western coast.

In 1964 Oster's passenger certificate expired when the boiler started to crack, by which time she was the last locally built coal-fired vessel operating in Norway. At the time a proposal was made to preserve the ship however it would have cost NOK 50,000 which was too expensive for people who wanted to preserve her. Their efforts inspired the Bergen deaf priest Ragnvald Hammer to write the poem " Dar kjem dampen" 1963 in honour of the ship. Norwegian folksinger Ivar Medaas subsequently wrote a melody for the poem.

With preservation unfeasible, the ship was sold to Berge Sag & Trelast Forretning (Brødrene Berge Ølensvåg) in April 1964. They converted her at their shipyard in Ølensvåg into a freighter by removing most of her top deck to leave only the aft end of the boat deck. On top of this a used wheelhouse was mounted. The steam engine was replaced with a modern 300 bhp Caterpillar diesel engine. These changes increased her weight to 199gt.

Now bearing the name Vaka she entered coastal service in 1966. In June 1974 the ship was sold to Oddmund Tjoflot of Vikebygd in Sunnhordland, for use in the local sand trade. In August 1988 she was sold again, this time to Partrederiet Kristoffersen & Gundersen (Thor Åge Kristoffersen) of Flekkerøy, in Kristiansand, who employed her to transport cargo.

=== Restoration ===
In March 1996 she was purchased by the Nordhordland Veteranbåtlag (NHVL) association and renamed Gamle Oster ("Old Oster"), which was subsequently shortened to Oster in August 2000. They commenced a three-year-long restoration in Bergen to bring her back to her original state as a steam-driven passenger ship. the restoration resulted in her diesel engine being replaced by a triple-expansion oil-fired steam engine built by Alexander Hall in Aberdeen in 1927 for the dredger Clearway. On 11 June 2005 the Oster was declared fully restored at a ceremony in Bergen at "Skur 11", the dock from which the ship had operated during her early career.

Today the Oster offers pleasure cruises carrying up to 100 passengers around Bergen's harbour.
