= European Sky Shield for Ukraine =

Military air protection plan

European Sky Shield for Ukraine was a proposed European-led air protection strategy designed to defend western and central Ukraine from Russian missile and drone attacks during the Russian invasion of Ukraine. Known formally as "SkyShield", the plan envisions an Integrated Air Protection Zone (IAPZ) operated by a coalition of willing NATO member states, but independent of formal NATO command. The mission would involve combat air patrols (CAPs) flown by up to 120 European fighter jets over uncontested Ukrainian territory, coordinated with the Ukrainian Air Force (UAF).

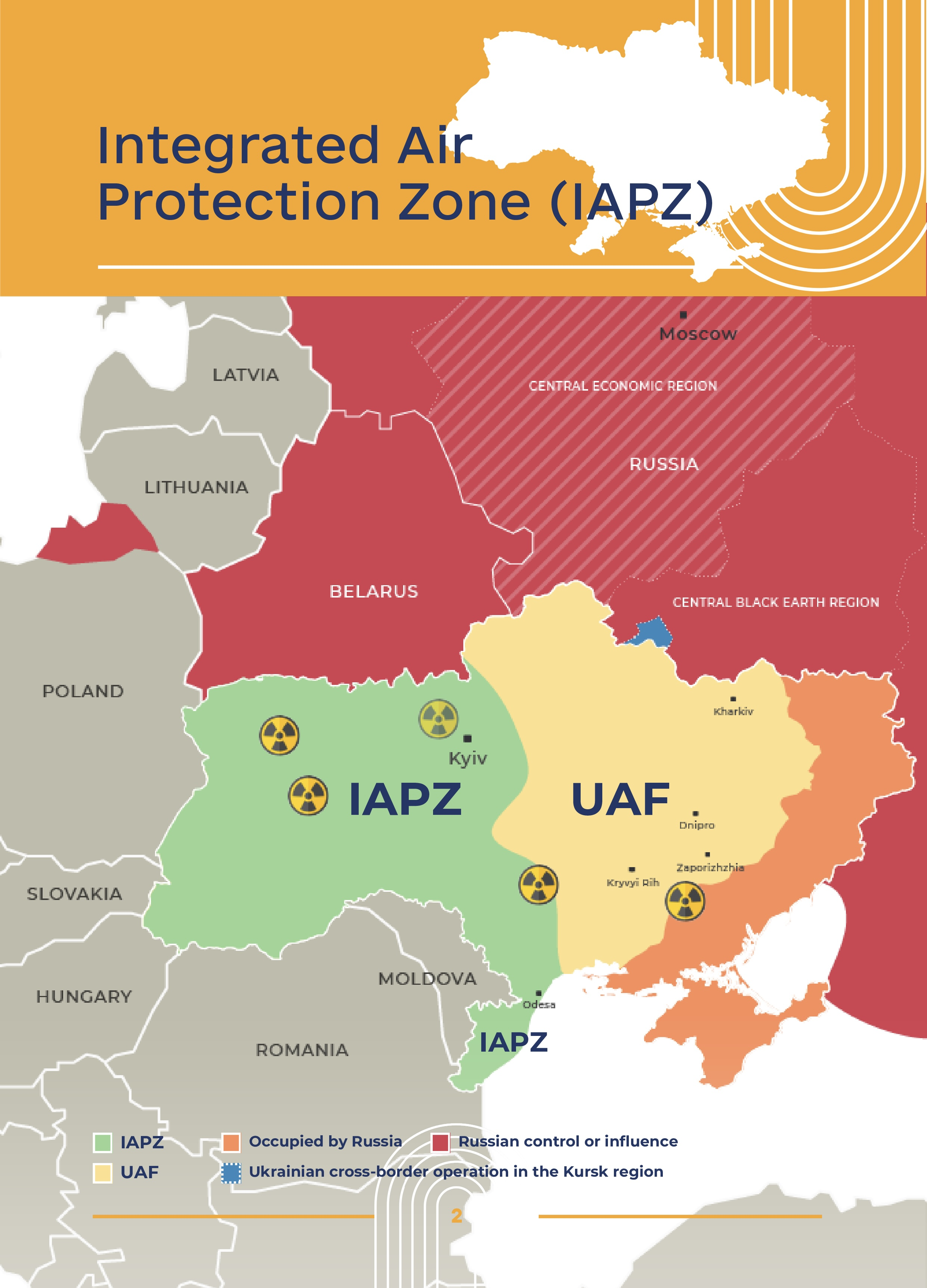
Integrated Air Protection Zone (IAPZ) map from the Sky Shield Initiative report, 2025.

SkyShield aims to protect critical infrastructure, including Ukraine’s operational nuclear power plants, major cities like Kyiv, Lviv, and Odesa, and vital economic corridors. The plan would not include operations in eastern parts of Ukraine. The plan is not directly related to the similarly named European Sky Shield Initiative, although defence analyst Stuart Crawford has drawn a connection between the two.

Supporters of the plan include former NATO commanders General Philip Breedlove and General Sir Richard Shirreff, as well as former Polish President Aleksander Kwaśniewski. Former Lithuanian Foreign Minister Gabrielius Landsbergis described the initiative as "an important component of Europe’s stepping up, guaranteeing Ukraine’s security effectively and efficiently."

== Background ==
Since the beginning of Russia’s full-scale invasion of Ukraine in February 2022, Ukrainian cities and civilian infrastructure have been subject to missile and drone attacks.

As of winter 2024–2025, Ukraine’s energy infrastructure remained a key target of Russian attacks, with repeated strikes on power plants and grid systems. These efforts aimed to destabilize the country by triggering widespread outages. Despite repairs and international support, the energy system faces immense strain.

Discussions on protecting Ukraine’s airspace began with the onset of Russia’s full-scale invasion in February 2022 but initially made little progress. The initiative gained renewed momentum following a tense meeting between Ukrainian President Volodymyr Zelenskyy and U.S. President Donald Trump in Washington.

== Overview of the SkyShield Proposal ==
The European Sky Shield was developed by former RAF planning specialists working together with the Ukrainian armed forces, and was proposed to European ministries of defense proposed in April 2024. However, the several ministries showed little willingness to sanction the patrolling of Ukraine's skies while the war is ongoing.

The proposal centers on the creation of an Integrated Air Protection Zone (abbreviated as IAPZ) covering western and central Ukraine. This zone would be patrolled by European fighter aircraft, providing a protective umbrella against cruise missile and drone attacks launched by Russian forces. The IAPZ would operate in parallel with the Ukrainian Air Force and remain more than 200 kilometers from the frontlines to minimize the risk of engagement with Russian combat aircraft.

The proposed initiative is designed to avoid direct confrontation with Russian forces by maintaining distance from the frontlines. Proponents argue that the initiative could achieve a greater military, political, and socioeconomic impact than the deployment of 10,000 European ground troops. They also contend that it carries a lower risk of escalation compared to not providing support. Such risks, they argue, can be mitigated through clear rules of engagement for the deployed air forces.

Modern Western fighters—120 F-16s or "operational equivalent" of F35s, Gripens, Rafales, and Eurofighters—would be deployed on a rotational basis from NATO territory, supported by airborne early warning (AEW&C), tanker, electronic warfare, and intelligence platforms. Unlike NATO's Article 5 commitments, this mission would be conducted by a coalition of willing states under a separate legal and command framework.

== 2025 developments ==
=== September ===
Interest in the proposal surged again after the events of September 10, 2025, when more than twenty Russian drones entered Polish airspace during strikes on Ukraine. The incident was described by officials and analysts as a test of NATO defenses, and it marked a significant escalation in Russian incursions into NATO airspace. In an interview days later, Poland’s foreign minister Radosław Sikorski said opinion was shifting toward allowing Western forces to shoot down drones over western Ukraine. In parallel, a petition launched in France by the Sky Shield France collective for Ukraine, composed by MP Frédéric Petit, communications professor Philippe Moreau-Chevrolet, and aviation analyst Xavier Tytelmann calling for a Sky Shield-type mission gathered nearly 60,000 signatures in France. Following these developments, the Sky Shield for Ukraine concept was updated to address growing drone threats to Europe. The update calls for a European-led air corridor over western Ukraine, integrating allied fighter jets, early-warning platforms and command networks to stop missiles and loitering munition before they reach NATO airspace.

=== October ===
According to the website Intelligence Online, on october 9, the Sky Shield France collective for Ukraine was received at the Élysée Palace by Emmanuel Macron's advisors to "discuss the technical feasibility of deploying military aircraft to protect Ukrainian airspace".

== Reactions and debate ==
=== Concerns ===
Stuart Crawford, a defence analyst, admitted there are some concerns regarding the plan in an interview with Deutsche Welle. He noted that the main challenge is not the deployment of fighter jets, but rather issues related to command, control, and rules of engagement. According to him, the plan is perfectly doable but those rules of engagement are especially important to ensure mechanisms for avoiding escalation, because mistakes do happen.

He also emphasized a key question—whether the United States would support the European defence effort and he is adding:

“If Russia chooses to escalate in response, that risk becomes very real.”

Some European officials have also expressed concern that a confrontation between Russian and European pilots could escalate the conflict further.

“If one European plane falls and a pilot is killed, it will be very difficult for a European government to explain it,” Konstantinos Zikidis of the Hellenic Air Force told Al Jazeera. “For a Greek pilot to go and get killed in Ukraine could bring the government down,” he added.

=== Support ===
General Sir Richard Shirreff, one of the signatories of the proposal stated that the plan deserves wide support. Reason is that it would not only send a powerful signal to Russia, but also to President Donald Trump, indicating that while he might reach a deal with Vladimir Putin, Europe remains committed to properly supporting Ukraine.

Two months later, general Shirreff also argued that the Sky Shield plan differs from the no-fly zone proposed in 2022, as it would involve only intercepting drones and missiles, without engaging Russian aircraft. He compares the concept to British and U.S. forces shooting down Iranian missiles over Israel, suggesting that, in the case of Ukraine, such action is even more important.

Supporters generally consider any risk of escalation as low because Russia has not flown its combat jets beyond the existing front lines since early 2022. Gabrielius Landsbergis, former Lithuanian foreign minister, said:

The implementation of Sky Shield would be an important component of Europe's stepping up, guaranteeing Ukraine's security effectively and efficiently.

== Signatories ==
According to SkyShield plan proposal, the initiative was signed by 73 individuals, including former and current politicians, military officials, and diplomats. Notable signatories include:

- Pavel Fischer – Chair, Committee on Foreign Relations, Security and Defence, MP, Czech Republic
- Jukka Kopra – Chair of Defence Committee, Finland
- Frédéric Petit – Deputy Chair of European Affairs Committee, French National Assembly, France
- Michael Gahler – Member of the European Parliament, Germany
- Gabrielius Landsbergis – Former Foreign Minister, Lithuania
- Aleksander Kwaśniewski – Former President, Poland
- Phil Brickell – MP, Foreign Affairs Select Committee, United Kingdom
- Greg Bagwell – Air Marshal (ret.), Royal Air Force, United Kingdom
- Iain Duncan Smith – MP, former party leader, United Kingdom
- Adam Kinzinger – Former Congressman; Lt. Col. in Air National Guard (ret.), United States
- Ben Hodges – Lt. General (ret.), US Army; former Commanding General, United States Army Europe

The following countries have individuals who signed the European Sky Shield Initiative for Ukraine, with the number of signatories from each:

- Canada – 6 signatories
- Czech Republic – 1 signatory
- Denmark – 1 signatory
- Estonia – 6 signatories
- Finland – 3 signatories
- France – 5 signatories
- Germany – 5 signatories
- Hungary – 1 signatory
- Italy – 3 signatories
- Latvia – 4 signatories
- Lithuania – 5 signatories
- Montenegro – 1 signatory
- Netherlands – 4 signatories
- Poland – 2 signatories
- United Kingdom – 20 signatories
- United States – 6 signatories
