= Incendiary kite =

Improvised weapon

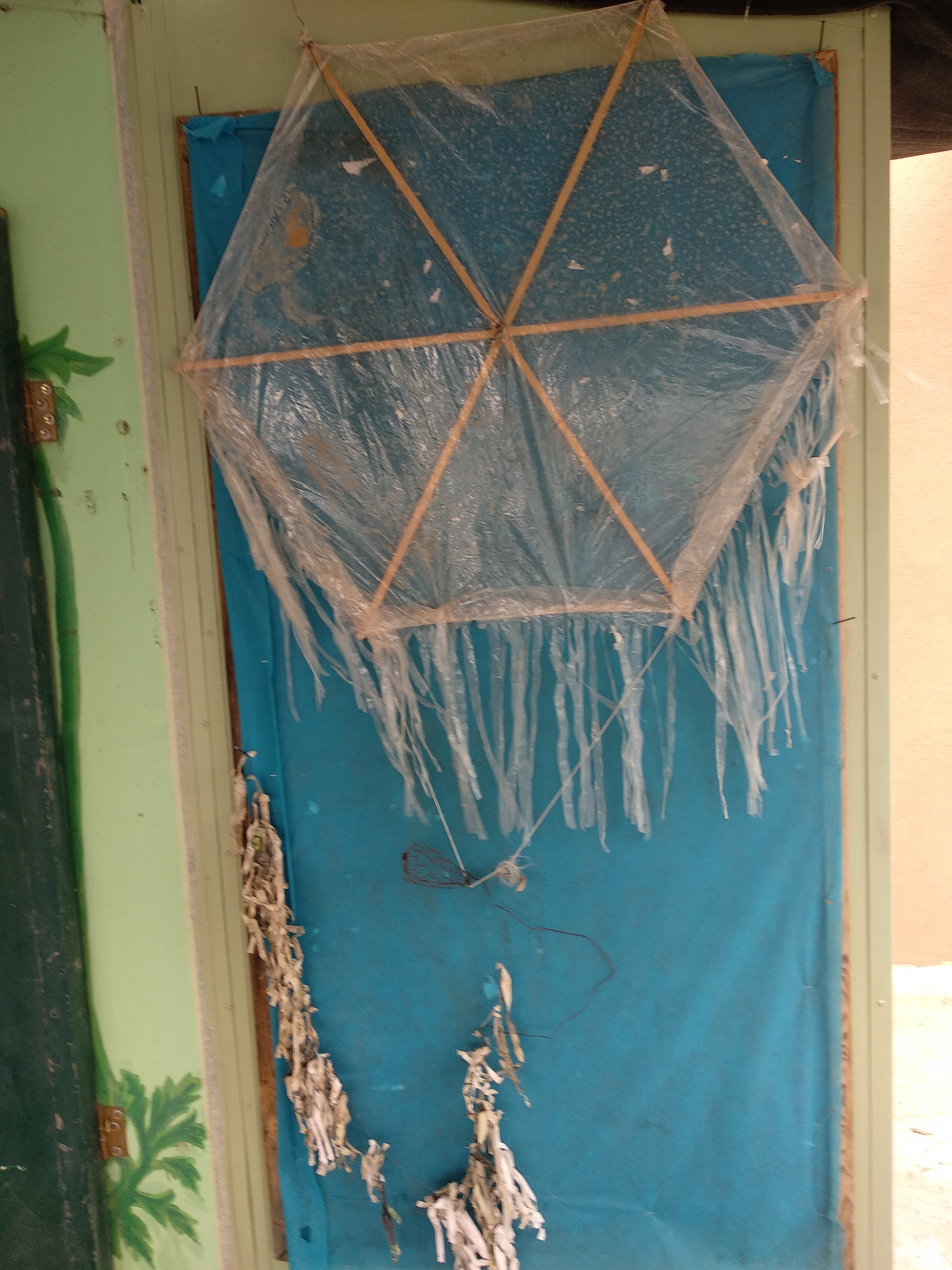
Firebomb kite with burning object attached to the end of its tail, sent from Gaza to cause fires in the fields of the Eshkol Regional Council.

An incendiary kite(also firebomb kite, flaming kite, fire kite) is a kite with a bomb, incendiary device, or Molotov cocktail attached.

== Historical use ==
Kites were first used in warfare by the Chinese. During the Song dynasty the Fire Crow, a kite carrying incendiary powder, a fuse and a burning stick of incense, was developed as a weapon. Walter de Milemete's 1326 De nobilitatibus, sapientiis, et prudentiis regum treatise depicts a group of knights flying a kite laden with a black-powder-filled firebomb over the wall of a city. According to Samguk Sagi, in 647 Kim Yu-sin, a Korean general of Silla, rallied his troops to defeat rebels by using flaming kites which also scared the enemy. In the 17th century, the forces of Thai king Phetracha tied gunpowder barrels to kites used for airborne assault.

== Gaza Strip use ==
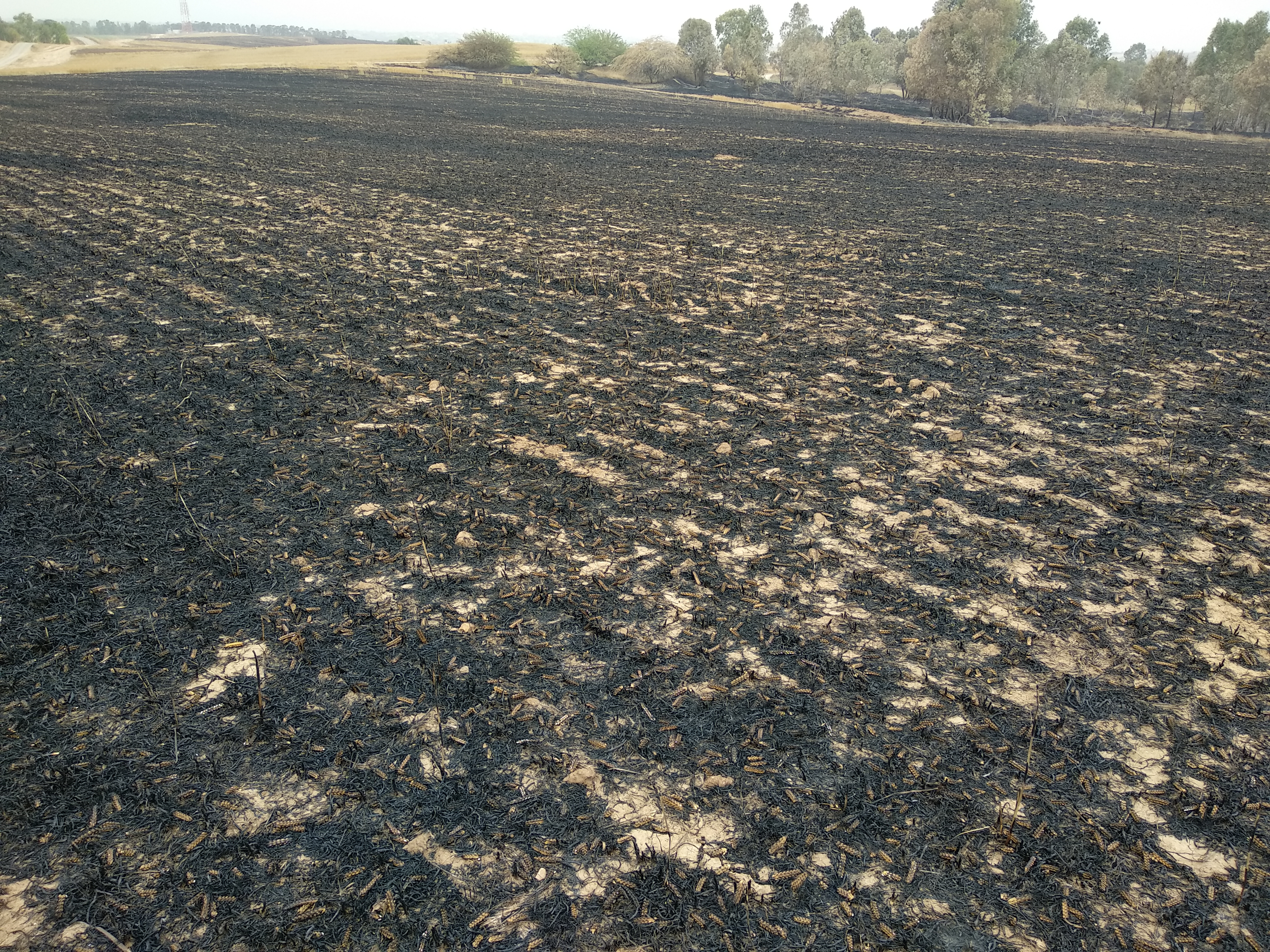
Burned fields by arson kite near Kibbutz Be'eri

During the 2018 Gaza border protests Palestinians from the Gaza Strip have flown fire bomb kites over the Israel–Gaza barrier, setting fires on the Israeli side of the border, Since the beginning of May 2018, longer range helium filled incendiary balloons, devised from party balloons and condoms, have been used alongside the kites. In one instance, a falcon outfitted with a harness with flaming material at the end was utilized as well.

As of 10 July 2018, incendiary kites and balloons have started 678 fires in Israel, destroying 2,260 acres (910 ha) of woodland and 1,500 acres (610 ha) of agricultural fields as well as causing additional damage to open fields..

On 25 August 2026 during the Gaza war, Israel warned Hamas that it will increase strikes on Gaza following concern over launches of kites, drones and balloons from the territory.as several kites were found in an Israeli community near the border with Gaza over the weekend, local media reported, threatening that "A balloon is treated like a kite, and a kite is treated like a drone, with or without explosives." , While hamas dismissed the accusations as pretext to break the ceasefire.

== See also ==
- Incendiary balloon
