= European Sky Shield Initiative =

Air defense system project

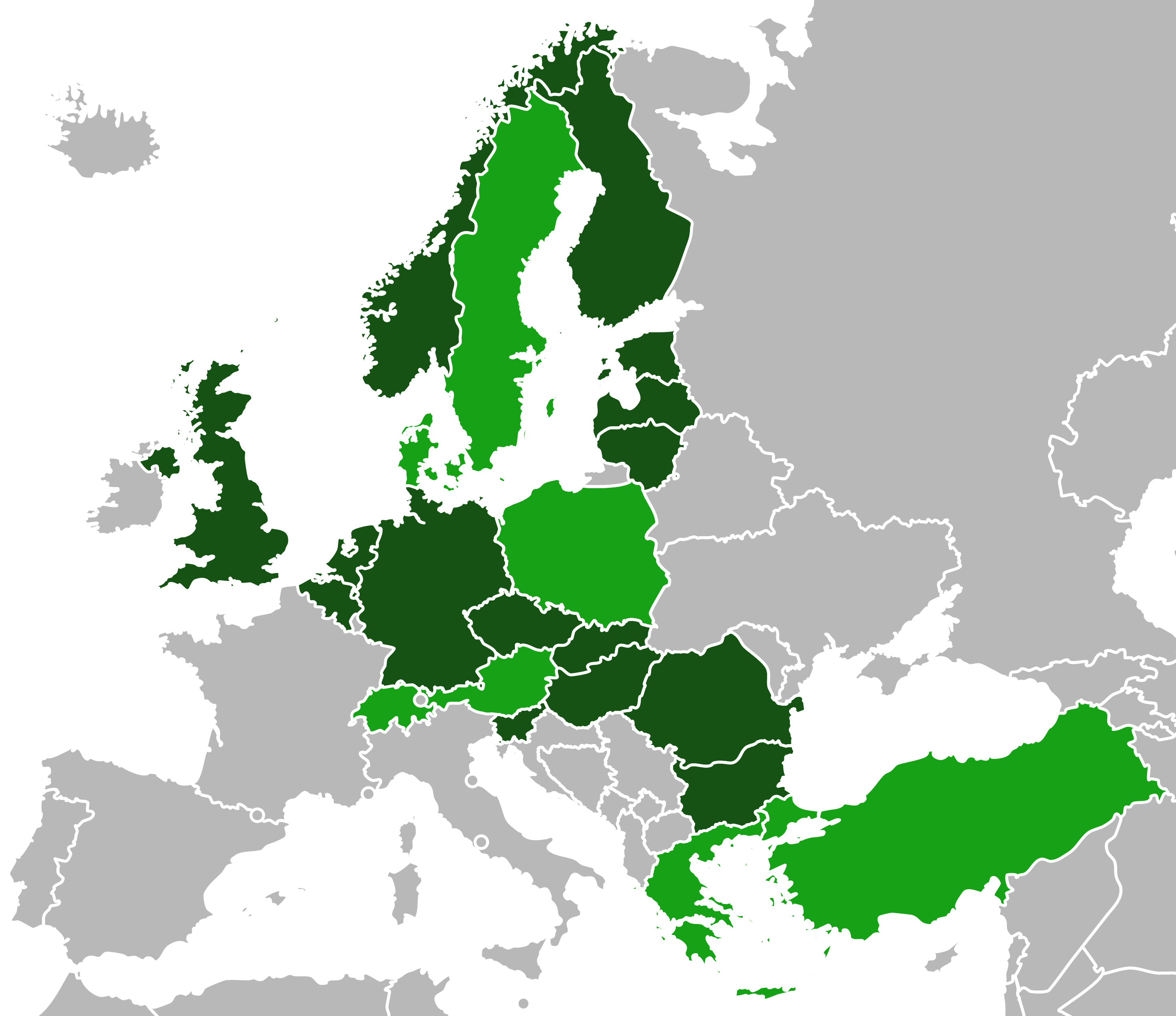
- Membership in 2024
- Type: Regional Military Initiative
- Established on: 13 October 2022; 4 years ago
- Members: 23 countries: Albania; Austria; Belgium; Bulgaria; Czech Republic; Denmark; Estonia; Finland; Germany; Greece; Hungary; Latvia; Lithuania; Netherlands; Norway; Portugal; Romania; Slovakia; Slovenia; Sweden; Switzerland; Turkey; United Kingdom
- Area: 3,697,779.6 km^{2} (1,427,720.7 sq mi)
- Population: 382,234,470

The European Sky Shield Initiative (ESSI) is a framework overseen by Germany to build a ground-based integrated European air defence system which includes anti-ballistic missile capability. As of 2025, 24 European states participate in the initiative.

A related but separate proposal is European Sky Shield for Ukraine, which would deploy a European-led Integrated Air Protection Zone covering western Ukraine using NATO member combat air patrols.

== Background ==
The initiative was originally proposed by the chancellor Olaf Scholz in August 2022. The proposal was made during the 2022–2023 Russian strikes against Ukrainian infrastructure and amid increased concerns about the limited European capability to defend against such threats as the Russian 9K720 Iskander ballistic missile systems deployed in Kaliningrad.

In October 2022, fifteen European states (Belgium, Bulgaria, the Czech Republic, Estonia, Finland, Germany, Hungary, Latvia, Lithuania, the Netherlands, Norway, Slovakia, Slovenia, Romania, the United Kingdom) signed a declaration to join the German-led initiative. It would involve joint procurement of the air defence systems. As of 2024, all founding states are members of NATO, with Finland's accession into the alliance occurring in 2023. The initiative also aims to strengthen the NATO Integrated Air Defence System.

In February 2023, Denmark and Sweden joined the project. In July 2023, neutral states Austria and Switzerland signed the declaration to join the initiative, they later passed the application with supplement in October 2024, raising questions about the future and practicalities of their policy of neutrality. In February 2024, the German government announced that Greece and Turkey would join the initiative; and that Poland would in April that year. In February 2025, Albania and Portugal officially joined the initiative.

France has been challenging the initiative, citing too much reliance in current plans on non-European equipment and technology. It was suggested that the French government had been dissatisfied that the French-Italian SAMP/T system had been excluded from ESSI. (Till Denmark chose SAMP/T NG in October 2025.) In June 2023, France made a counter-proposal and has been calling for other countries to examine the alternatives. As of July 2026, three major European states, namely France, Italy, and Spain did not make a decision to join the ESSI.

Germany's announced procurement of the Israeli Arrow 3 Missile System in May 2025 is considered a critical long-term element of its contribution to the European Sky Shield Initiative. Arrow 4, which is currently under development, will provide a high-altitude defense layer that complements existing systems like IRIS-T SLM and MIM-104 Patriot.

== Capability ==
The ESSI will use multi-layered defence, with the following systems planned:

- Close range: Skyranger 30 and Tridon Mk2
- Short range (0–10 km): IRIS-T SLS
- Medium range (10–70 km): IRIS-T SLM and NASAMS
- Long range (70–150 km): MIM-104 Patriot and SAMP/T
- Very long range (100+ km exoatmospheric): Arrow 3

In December 2022, the German Chancellor expressed a hope that the system will be developed in the next five years. In June 2023, the German Bundestag authorized nearly €4 billion for the acquisition of Arrow 3 anti-ballistic missile system from Israel. The contract was signed in November 2023. In February 2025, the construction of Arrow 3 started, with the intent to establish the initial capability in 2025 and full operational capability by 2030.

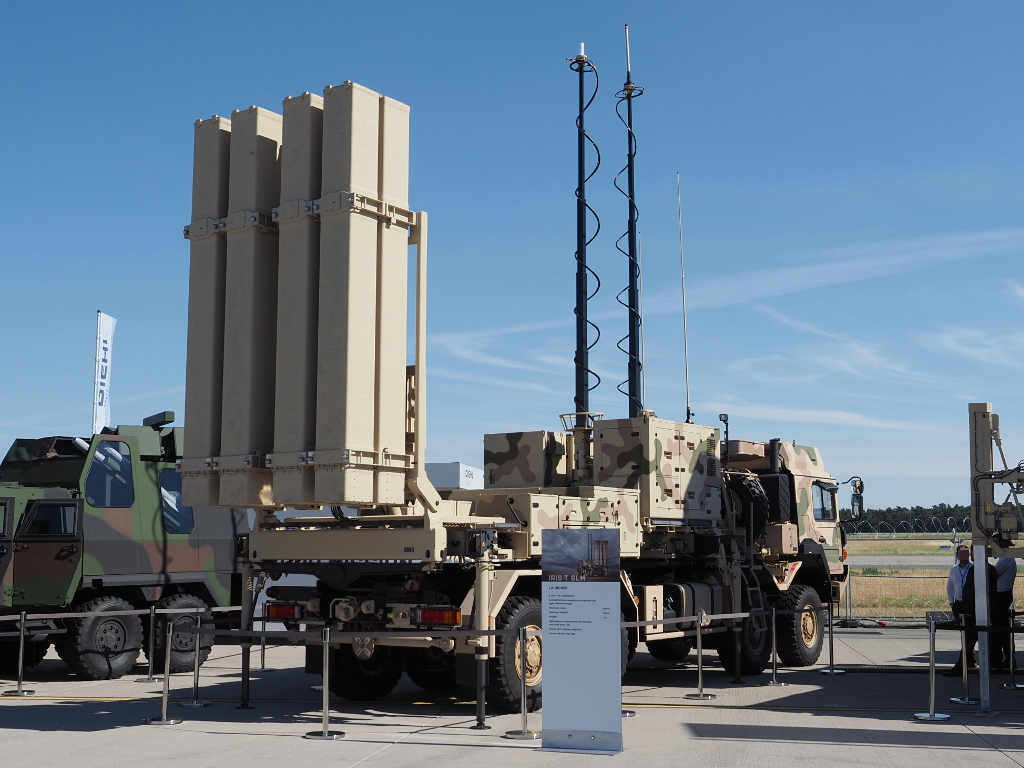
Diehl IRIS-T SLM launcher

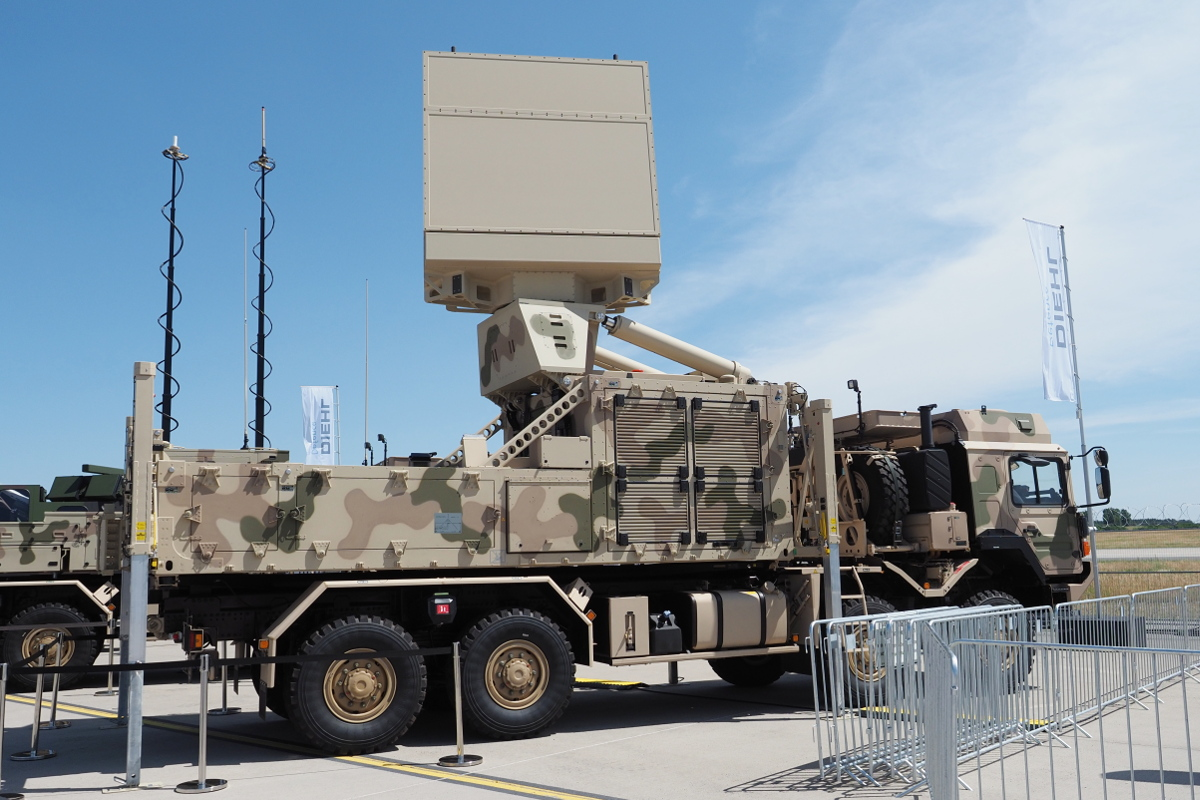
Hensoldt TRML-4D radar for IRIS-T SLM

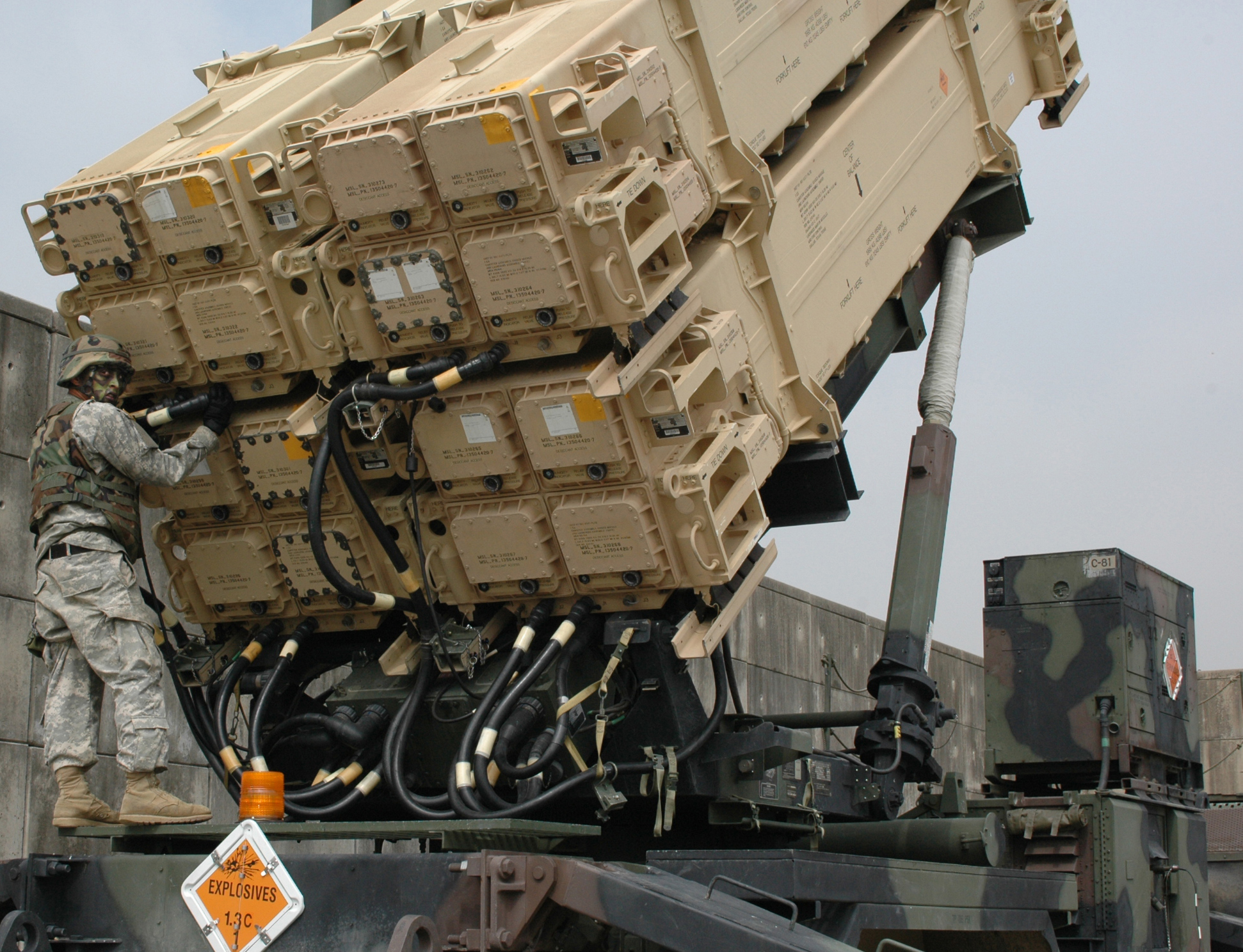
MIM-104 Patriot launcher with PAC-3 MSE missiles

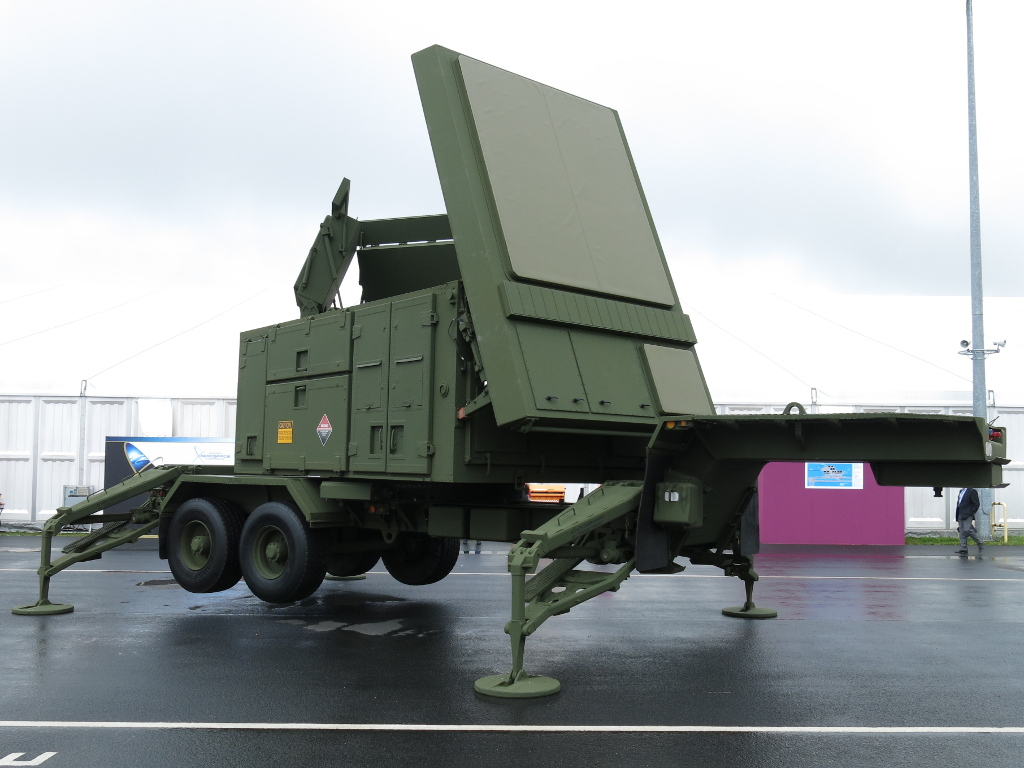
Raytheon LTAMDS radar for MIM-104 Patriot

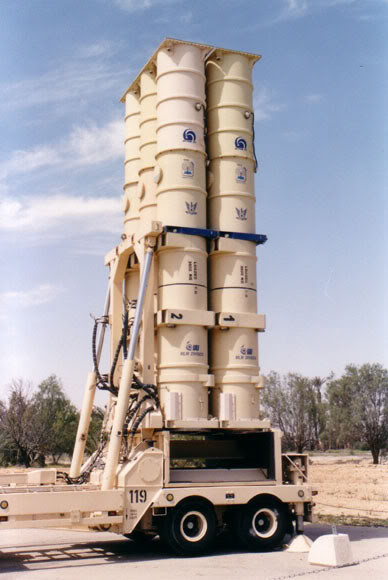
IAI Arrow 3 launcher

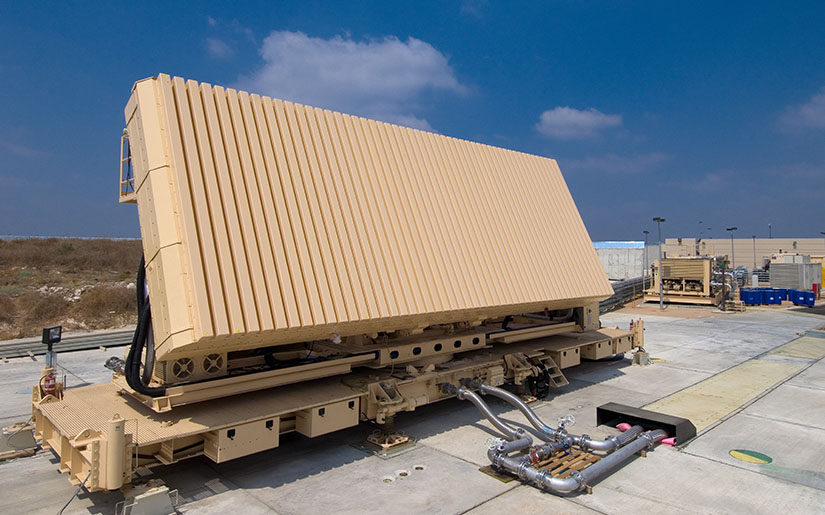
EL/M-2080 Green Pine radar for Arrow 3

== Membership ==
Membership progresses through three sequential steps: a non-binding Letter of Intent, a Cooperative Procurement Framework Memorandum of Understanding, and explicit multi-year Programme Agreements.

== See also ==
- Aegis Ballistic Missile Defense System
- Iron Dome
- Strategic Defense Initiative
- Security Action for Europe
- National Missile Defence
- NATO missile defense system
- 2020s European rearmament
