= Iron Beam =

Laser Dome
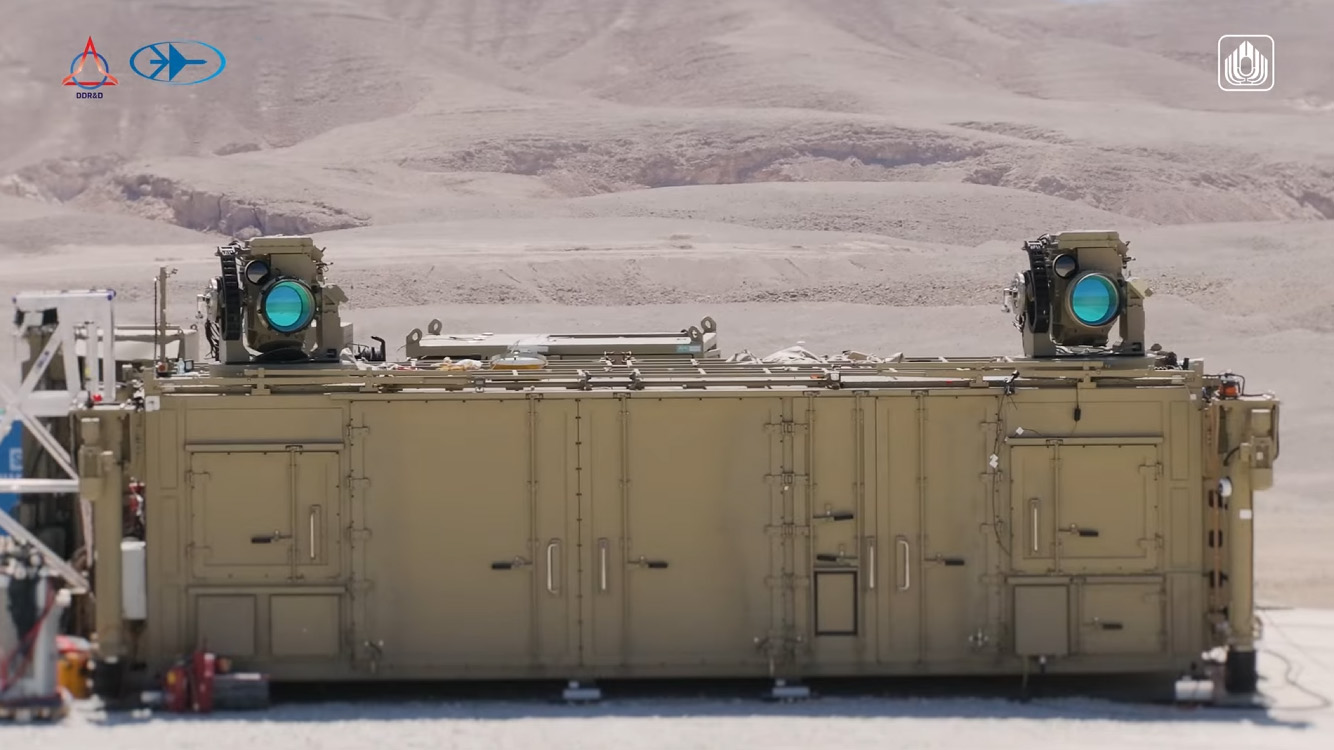
- Type: Directed-energy weapon, Laser weapon
- Place of origin: Israel

Service history
- In service: 28 December 2025
- Used by: Israel

Production history
- Designer: Rafael Advanced Defense Systems, Directorate of Defence Research & Development
- Designed: 2010–2025
- Manufacturer: Rafael Advanced Defense Systems (system) and Elbit Systems (laser source)
- Unit cost: $10s million for a system, few dollars per interception
- Variants: Iron Beam, Naval Iron Beam, Iron Beam-M, Lite Beam

Iron Beam, officially Laser Dome in English and Eitan's Light (Hebrew: אור איתן) in Hebrew, is a laser directed-energy weapon system developed by Israeli defense contractor Rafael Advanced Defense Systems. It was unveiled at the Singapore Airshow on 11 February 2014.

The system is designed to destroy short-range rockets, artillery, and mortar bombs, and officially began deployment in December 2025. It has a range of up to 10 km (6.2 mi), complementing the Iron Dome system which was designed to intercept missiles launched from a greater distance. In addition, the system could also intercept unmanned aerial vehicles (UAVs; drones) at a cost of US$3 per interception. Iron Beam will constitute the fifth element of Israel's integrated missile defense system, in addition to Arrow 2, Arrow 3, David's Sling and Iron Dome.

== Name ==
The system's original name was "Iron Beam". It was later renamed "Magen Or" ("Shield of Light"). In September 2025, it was decided that the system's Hebrew name would be "Or Eitan" ("Eitan's Light") in memory of Captain Eitan Oster, an officer and combat soldier in the Egoz reconnaissance unit who was killed during the ground maneuver in Lebanon in the Gaza war. He was the son of Dov Oster, one of the system's key designers and developers. In English, the system is officially called "Laser Dome" but commonly retains its original name.

== Characteristics ==
Iron Beam uses a fiber laser to generate a laser beam to destroy an airborne target. Whether acting as a stand-alone system or with external cueing as part of an air-defense system, a threat is detected by a surveillance system and tracked by vehicle platforms in order to engage.

The problem for laser weapons is that air density disperses laser energy, with larger beams facing more atmospheric interference. Iron Beam's solution is to shoot hundreds of small, coin-sized beams at a target, which individually face less dispersion. When a beam is detected through a telescopic reflection to have hit the target, more beams are redirected to the spot to concentrate energy until it is destroyed.

== Variants ==
=== Iron Beam ===
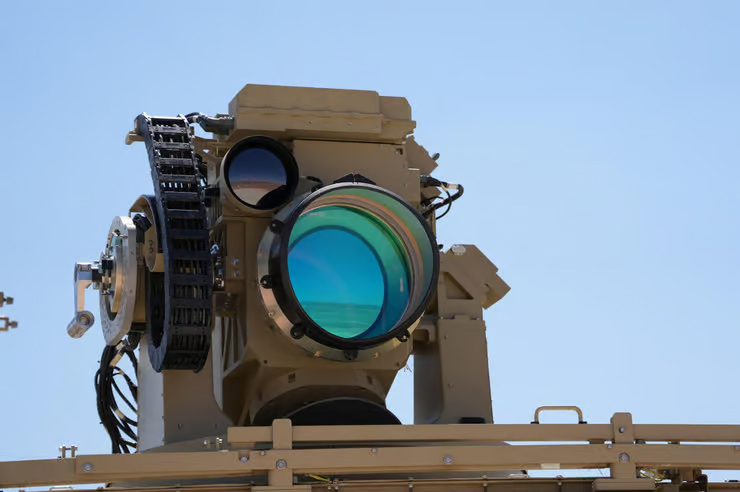
Iron Beam 450 laser beam director

The latest iteration of the ground-based air defense battery, referred to as Iron Beam 450, is a 100 kW-class system that has a larger 450 mm aperture beam director compared to previous designs. Revealed in June 2025 at the Paris Air Show, Rafael claimed the new system “delivers longer range, higher accuracy, and faster engagement...". It is designed to intercept UAVs, mortars, rockets, artillery, and cruise missiles.

An Iron Beam battery is composed of an air defense radar, a command and control (C2) unit, and two high-energy laser weapon system (HELWS) beam directors. Initially intended to be mobile and able to be used standalone, it was later rendered non-mobile to address weight and power availability concerns and integrated into Iron Dome to reduce complexity. Earlier designs were stated to be capable of 100kW of power focused on a coin-sized area at a distance of 10 km (6.2 mi).

=== Naval Iron Beam ===
At the International Maritime Defense Exhibition (IMDEX) in May 2023 Rafael presented a proposed naval variant of the Iron Beam. The 100 kW-class system would be based on the land battery but adapted for operation at sea, focussed on achieving stability over the duration of an engagement. Naval Iron Beam is proposed to be either integrated directly into a ship's superstructures or operate standalone as a pair of 20-foot containers mounted on deck. At IMDEX 2025 the company confirmed sea trials are planned aboard an unspecified navy vessel. A few months later it was reported by Aviation Week that industrial work to develop the Naval Iron Beam variant had begun.

=== Iron Beam-M ===
Iron Beam-M is 50 kW-class mobile truck-mounted variant with a 250 mm aperture, capable of shooting down rockets, mortars and drones.

=== Lite Beam ===
A smaller adaptation called Lite Beam was displayed at an Association of the United States Army (AUSA) event in October 2024. It can be mounted on light vehicles and destroy drones, rockets, mortars, and IEDs. The 10 kW beam has a range of 2,000 metres (1.2 miles). Lite Beam is combined with 30 mm (1.2 in) Samson Remote Controlled Weapon Station (RCWS) to provide multiple force protection options.

== History ==
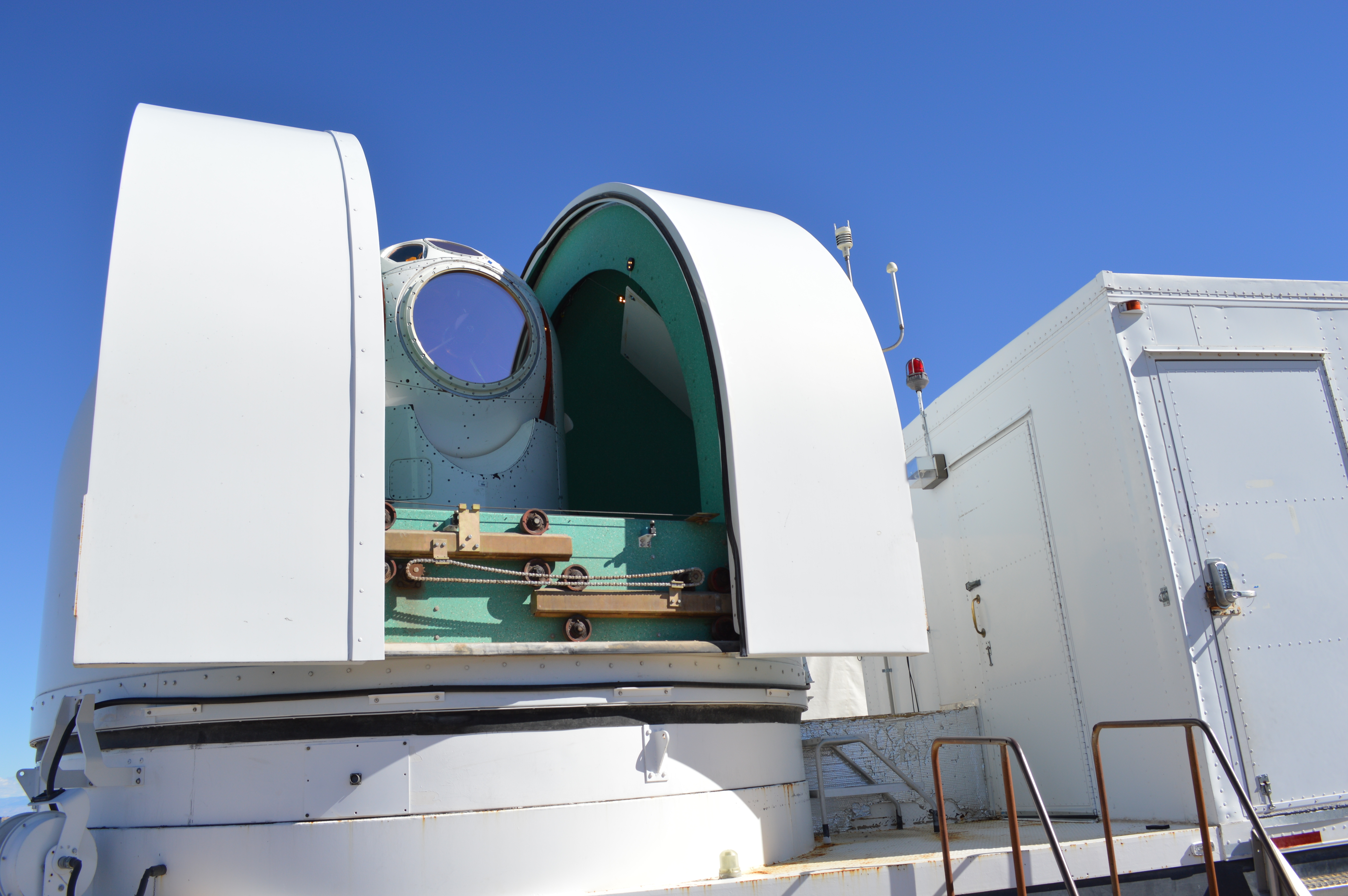
Demonstrator Laser Weapon System, White Sands, 2017

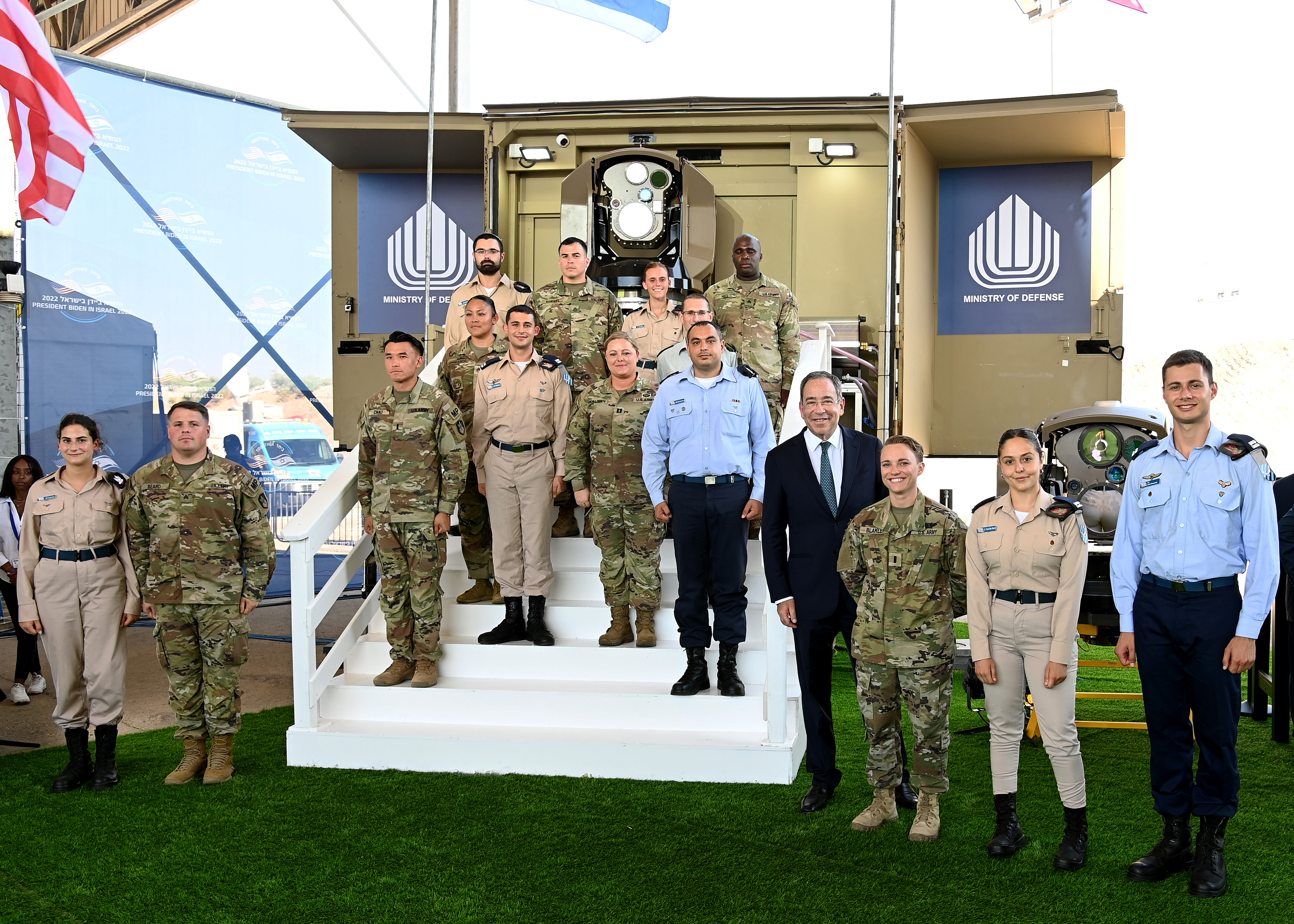
Ambassador Tom Nides with IDF and US Defense personnel before the aerial defense system at Ben Gurion Airport, 13 July 2022

On 18 July 1996, the United States and Israel entered into an agreement to produce a cooperative Tactical High Energy Laser (THEL), called the Advanced Concept Technology Demonstrator, which would utilize deuterium fluoride chemical laser technologies. THEL conducted test firing in FY1998, and Initial Operating Capability (IOC) was planned in FY1999. However, this was significantly delayed. In 2000 and 2001 THEL shot down 28 Katyusha artillery rockets and five artillery shells. On 4 November 2002, THEL shot down an incoming artillery shell. In 2005, the US and Israel decided to cancel the THEL after the project budget had surpassed $300 million. The decision came as a result of "its bulkiness, high costs and poor anticipated results on the battlefield."

In 2007, Ehud Barak requested to reconsider project Skyguard (the next phase of THEL) in order to fight Qassam attacks.

As of 2016, the Iron Beam had been funded mainly by the Israeli Ministry of Defense (MoD), with Rafael pursuing increasing the range of the system and partnering with other companies to further develop the prototype. In December 2022, Rafael and Lockheed Martin announced a joint effort to develop a laser defense system based on the Iron Beam project. The aim is to produce a system made up of a pair of solid-state lasers that, when combined, could boost power up to 300 kW, and to use more than one beam to simultaneously attack multiple targets.

Based on 14 years of research and development in solid-state lasers as of 2024, the new Iron Beam system is under development by Rafael (in collaboration with Lockheed Martin for the US market) and funded by the Israeli Ministry of Defense. The Iron Beam concept, as a part of a multi-layered defense, was announced at the Singapore Airshow in 2014. A demonstrator Laser Weapons System was operating by 2017.

In April 2022, the Israeli Ministry of Defense and Rafael announced that in a series of experiments the system successfully shot down drones, rockets, mortar bombs, and antitank missiles at White Sands Missile Range. The military pushed for an earlier deployment, possibly due to concerns that there would not be sufficient Iron Dome projectiles to combat attacks; Prime Minister Naftali Bennett said in February 2022 that Israel would deploy the system within the year. However, in October 2022 Rafael said it expects to take "two to three years" to deploy the 100-kW weapon operationally.

In May 2023, Rafael unveiled the Naval Iron Beam meant for installation on ships. The system is designed to emit 100 kW out to "several kilometers" to protect vessels against drone swarms and anti-ship missiles. The naval version maintains the same turret external dimensions and can be configured to be integrated onto ship superstructures or in containerized modules to be embarked when needed. The Naval Iron Beam is planned to be operational within four to five years and first be fitted to the Israeli Navy's Reshef-class corvette.

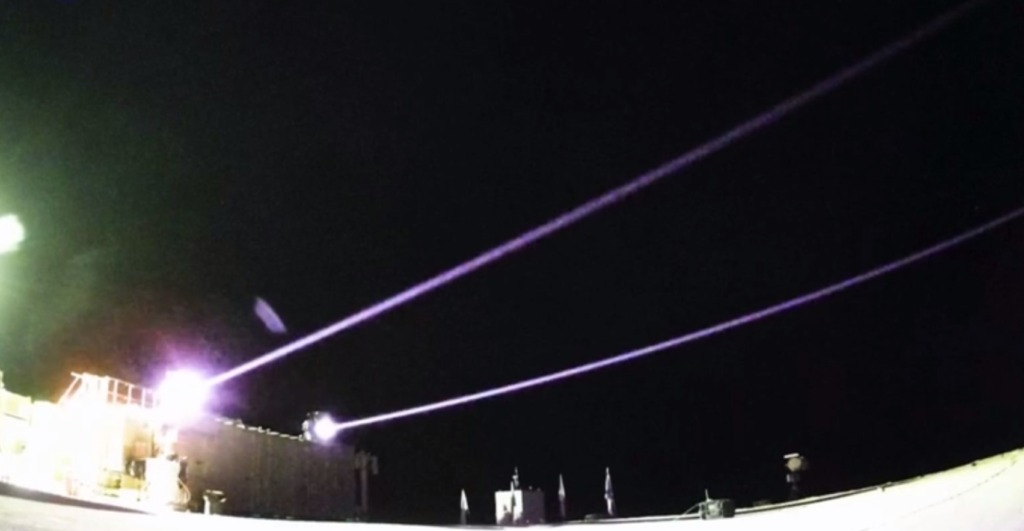
Iron Beam shooting laser in its final test, 2025.

In October 2023, the Ministry of Defense and Rafael announced that they would deploy Iron Beam to the southern border with the Gaza Strip to test against rocket barrages fired by Hamas during Gaza war.

On 28 May 2025, Rafael Advanced Defense Systems announced the world's first-ever combat use of high-power laser systems to intercept aerial threats. The engagements happened in October 2024 during the Gaza War; 40 Hezbollah UAVs were intercepted. MOD said that no Iron Beam components were involved, and Israeli media described it as a "scaled-down version" of the definitive system. This led to speculation that Lite Beam or Iron Beam-M was used instead. As of January 2026, it had been officially integrated into Israel's armed forces.

In October 2026, local Cypriot paper I Simerini reported two Lite Beam units were being purchased by the government.

== Advantages and disadvantages ==
The main benefits of using a directed energy weapon over conventional missile interceptors are lower costs per shot, unlimited number of firings, lower operational costs, and less manpower. There is also no interceptor debris to fall on the area protected. It has been argued, since 2014 at least, that a directed energy weapon could be the missing element to Israel's existing layered defense strategies.

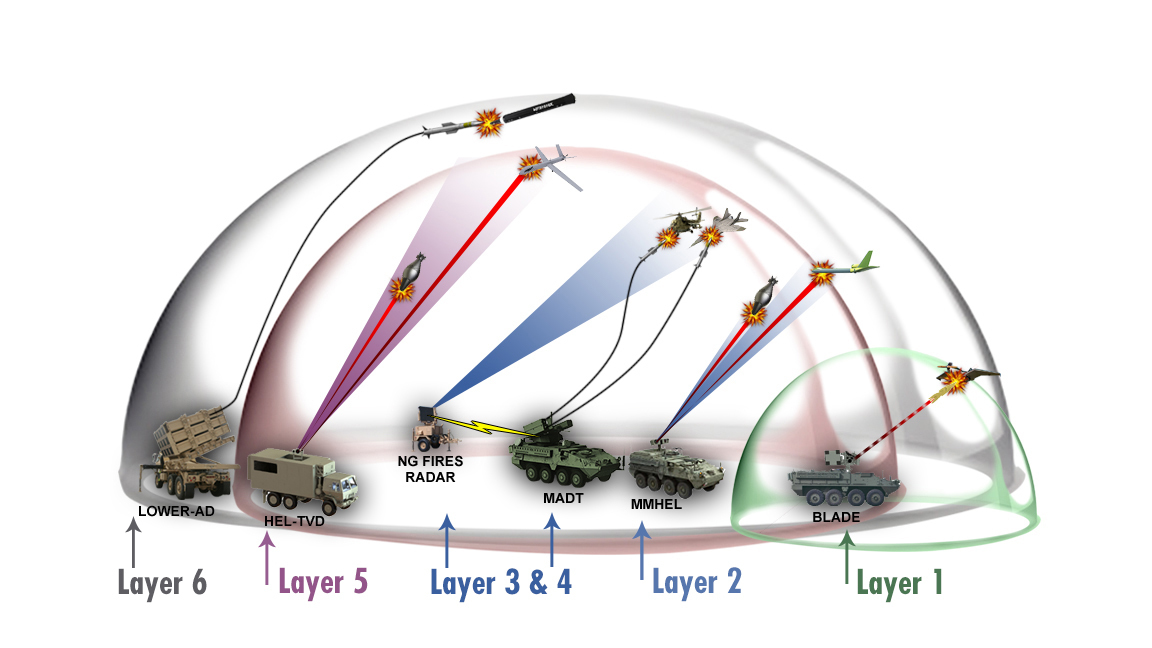
A tiered defense concept, involving Multi-Mission High Energy Laser and High Energy Laser Tactical Vehicle.

Disadvantages of energy weapons include the requirement for the beam to penetrate the atmosphere; clouds, rain, battlefield smoke or a high concentration of sand dust in the air (not atypical in the Middle-East conditions) may prevent its use. The beam must be held on the target, which may be spinning, for several seconds (the "dwell time") before enough energy is delivered to destroy or severely damage it. This makes it difficult to stop a barrage of several missiles even if the system is effective, so that volley fire of interceptors continues to be required. There is also the possibility of rockets being sheathed in heat-resistant material to withstand an energy beam for longer. Energy weapons may be more effective against slower-flying drones, with relatively delicate rotors, control flaps, and guidance systems vulnerable to shorter laser attack, than fast rockets. This technology may also prove effective against paratroopers.

The cost of each interception is negligible, unlike expensive missile interceptors – a few dollars direct cost per shot, and around US$2,000 to cover all costs, against $100,000 to $150,000 per interceptor firing. However, setting up and deploying an energy weapon such as Iron Beam is costly; despite the low cost per firing, it may not be the most cost-efficient defense.

== Operators ==
Israel

== See also ==
- Tactical High Energy Laser (THEL), a previous laser system designed by the United States and Israel for similar purposes that was cancelled in 2005.
- DragonFire, a similar UK weapon expected to be operational in 2027.
- Light Blade, a simpler Israeli air defense laser system, deployed to shoot down balloons.
