= MPrest Systems =

mPrest Systems
- Company type: Private
- Industry: Software, Aerospace, Defence, IT
- Founded: 2000; 26 years ago
- Headquarters: Petah Tikva, Israel
- Key people: Natan Barak (CEO)
- Products: C4I, mCore, mClient
- Number of employees: 51–200
- Website: mprest.com

mPrest Systems is a private Israeli company, producing C4I applications. It serves commercial companies as well as military and law enforcement agencies.

It is the developer of the Battle Management Control (BMC) system in Israel's Iron Dome system, a mobile air defense system designed to intercept all kinds of short-range rockets, and of its weapons control system. The BMC is informally known as "Iron Glow". mPrest is 50% owned by Rafael Advanced Defense Systems, the prime contractor of Iron Dome. Its chief executive officer is Natan Barak, a former director of C4I for the Israel Navy.

mPrest Systems has also used the technology behind its Iron Dome command and control platform to enable natural disaster management.
