= EL/M-2084 =

Ground-based mobile 3D AESA multi-mission radar

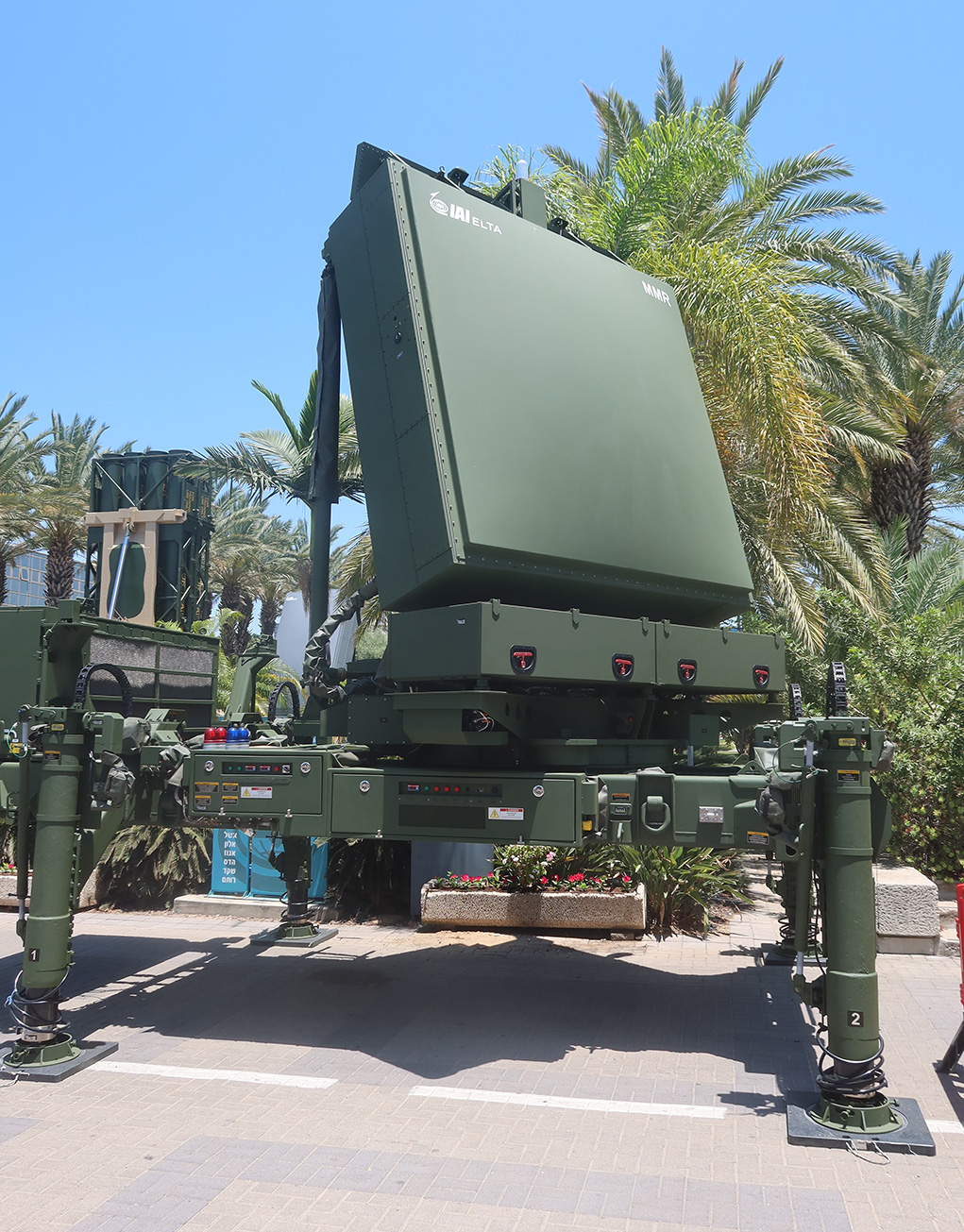
ELM-2084 Multi Mission Radar from IAI ELTA Systems

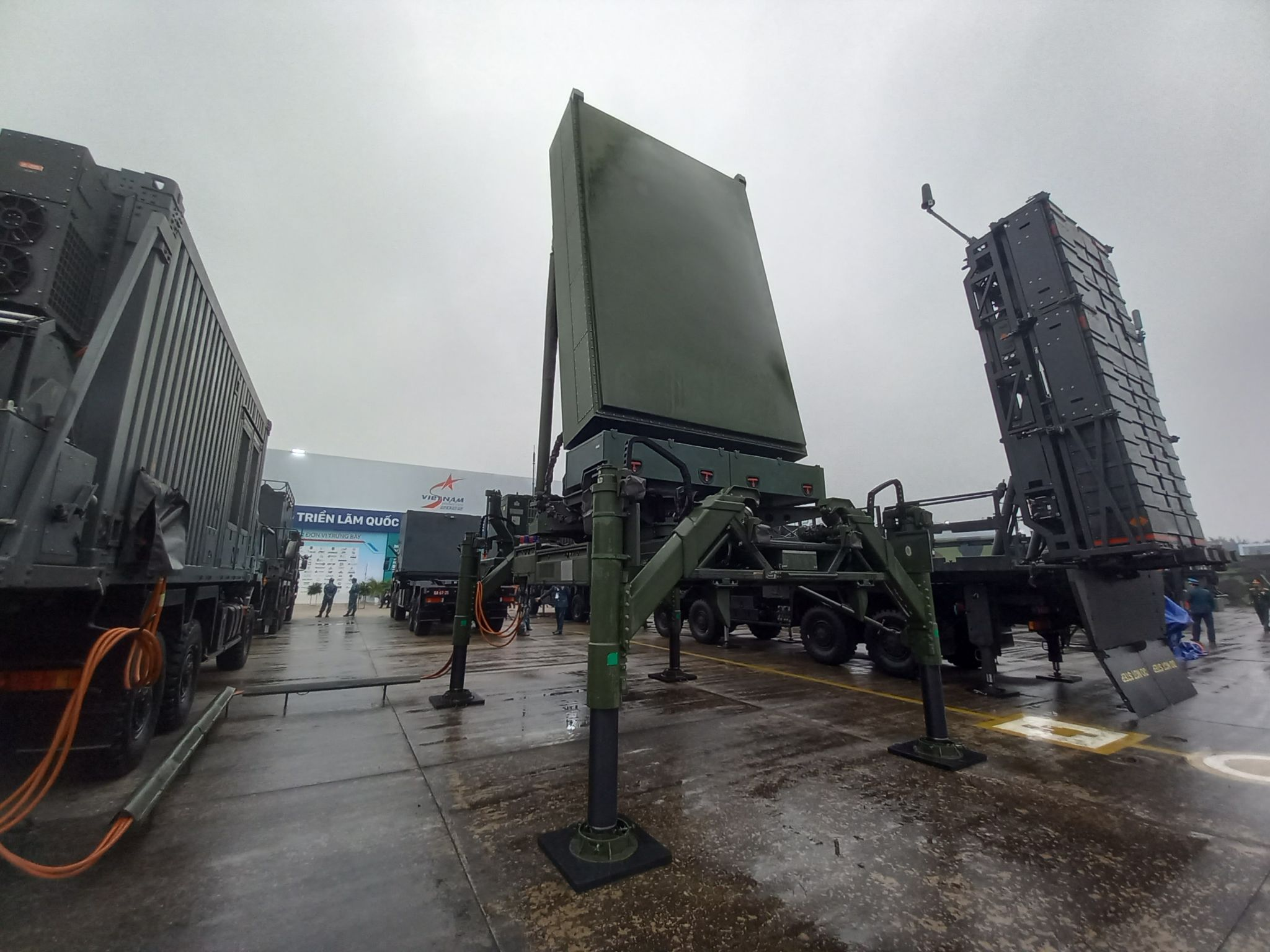
An ELM-2084 antenna of the Vietnamese Air Defence Force. It exhibited alongside a SPYDER-MR battery, which the ELM-2084 acts like a fire-control radar for the respective SPYDER system.

The ELM-2084 is an Israeli ground-based mobile 3D AESA multi-mission radar (MMR) family produced by ELTA, a subsidiary of Israel Aerospace Industries.

The radar is capable of detecting and tracking both aircraft and ballistic targets and providing fire control guidance for missile interception or artillery air defense.

Several versions of the radar were purchased and are operated by a number of armies, including the Israel Defense Forces, Canadian Army, Republic of Singapore Air Force, Army of the Czech Republic, Slovak Armed Forces.

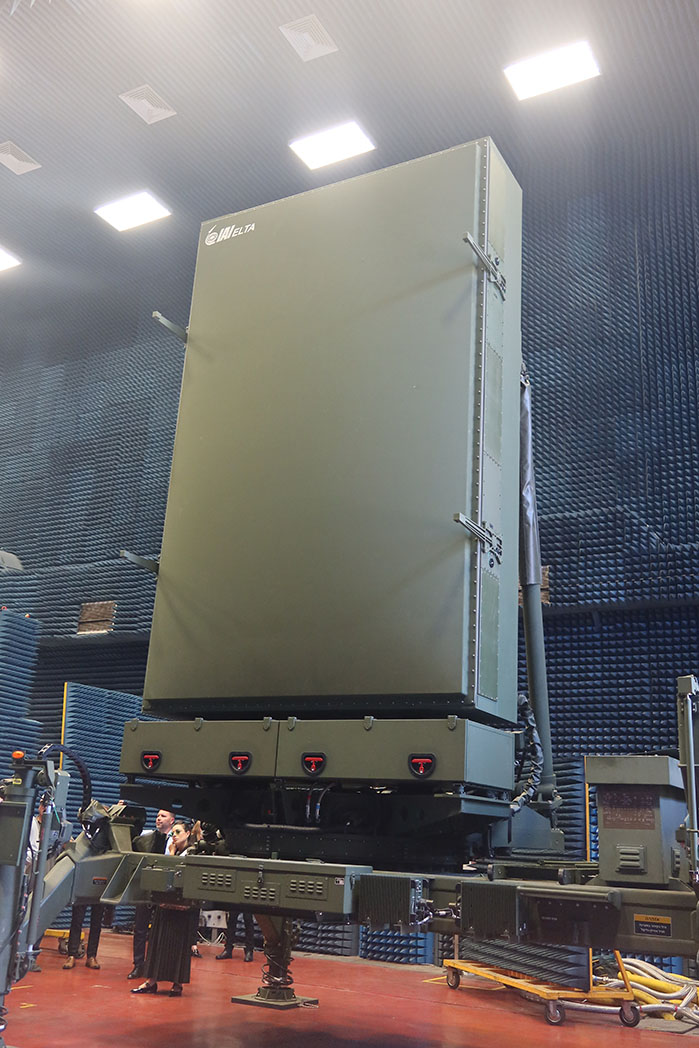
ELM-2084 MMR radar being tested in one of ELTA System's unechoic chambers before its delivery. In June 2025 ELTA delivered the 250th radar of the MMR family.

== System development ==
The MMR's development was launched by Elta and the Administration for the Development of Weapons and Technology (Hebrew abbreviated Maf'at) in 2002 as a response to the growing ballistic threat to Israel.

A prototype of the system was used during IDF operation "Cast Lead" in 2008 as an early warning radar, detecting HAMAS artillery fire and providing an accurate alert for the Israeli home front.

The first successful interception using the MMR as a firing control unit took place on April 7, 2011, with the Iron Dome intercepting a rocket fired from the Gaza Strip towards Ashkelon, a city in southern Israel. In June 2025 ELTA Systems delivered the 250th radar of the MMR family.

== Description ==
As a tactical radar, the ELM-2084 is a mobile system comprising a radar unit, a control module, a cooling unit, and a power generator. It can be mounted on various transportation platforms.

The radar was designed to meet medium-range operational needs on the battlefield, encompassing detection, classification, and tracking of targets.

The Radar's main missions are:

- Hostile weapon location – detection and tracking of hostile ballistic projectiles, calculating enemy launchers or artillery positions.
- Early warning – impact point calculation for warning the civil population and military rear units.
- Friendly fire ranging – tracking of friendly artillery and providing corrections to the firing unit.
- Aerial surveillance – detecting and tracking aircraft, maintaining a continuous aerial picture.
- Fire control radar – for various air defense systems, including Barak MX, Iron Dome, David's Sling, Skyhunter, and SPYDER-MR (Medium Range).

Notable features of the radar:

- Advance technology Active electronically scanned array (AESA) radar
- Extensive operational experience, due to participation in large number of interceptions
- Interoperability with modern battle management systems and several different interceptor missiles.
- The radar is advertised as capable of processing all types of threats – aerial and ballistic including low radar cross-section (RCS) targets.

== Variants ==
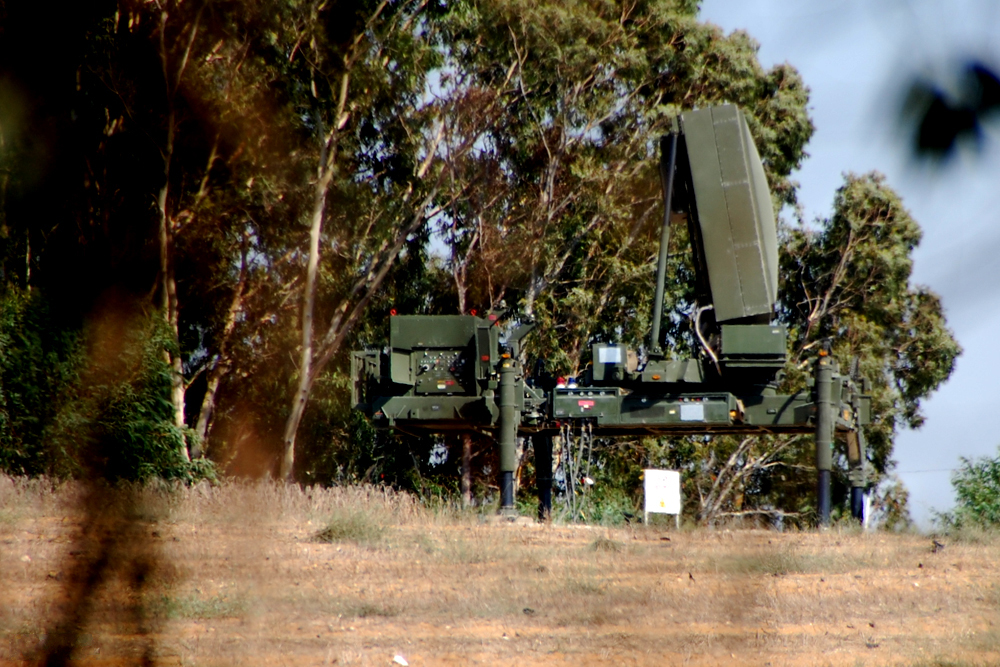
A M-MMR deployed as the FCR of an IRON DOME battery in Israel. Noticeable in this picture is the smaller antenna size

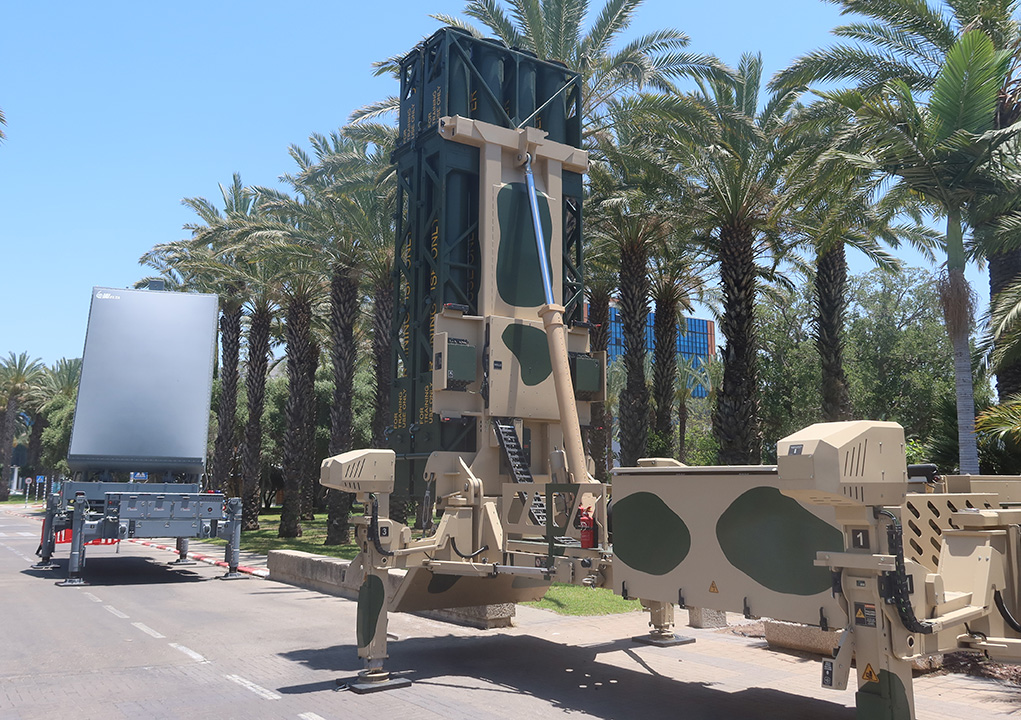
IAI Barak MX air defense fire unit shown with associated ELTA Systems' ELM-2084 MMR radar.

=== ELM-2084 ===
This variant is the most prominent member of the family, with two sub variants, distinguished by antenna size and range capabilities: The MMR is capable of air surveillance, hostile weapon locating and fire guidance for the medium range.

==== ELM-2084 Mini MMR ====
The M-MMR is a scaled down MMR variant for Medium range threats.

=== ELM-2311 ===
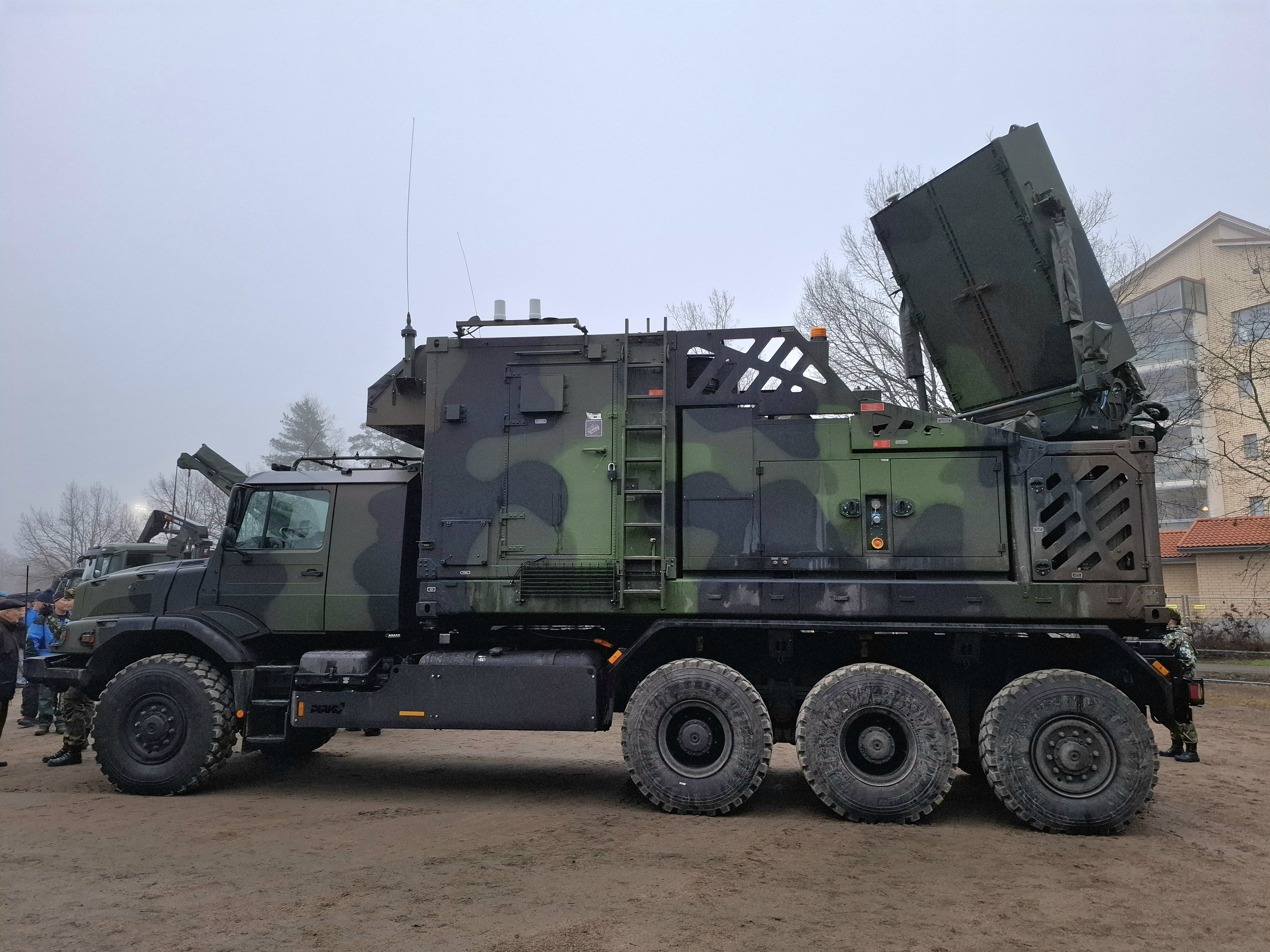
An ELM-2311 of the Finnish Defence Forces installed on a Mercedes-Benz Zetros off-road truck.

The ELM-2311 is a C-band tactical C-RAM radar built for the battalion level. It is designed for a single vehicle platform, with a small operational crew.

The Radar is designed to operate in Artillery fire ranging and hostile weapons locating roles.

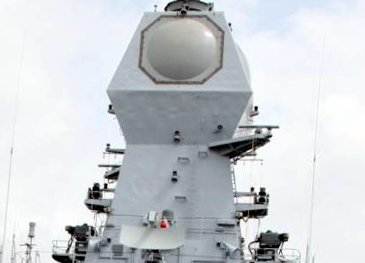
ELM-2248 MF-STAR radar onboard INS Kolkata (D63) of the Indian Navy

=== ELM-2248 MF-STAR ===
The MF-STAR Radar is a naval implementation of The MMR, made up of four MMR modules mounted around a pyramid shaped mast. The radar provides full 360º coverage for air surveillance, hostile weapons locating and fire guidance capabilities naval platforms. The ELM-2248 is in service in the Israeli and Indian navies. The ELM-2248 is the fire control radar for the Barak 8 system.

==== ELM-2248 LB ====
The MF-STAR LB is a land based variant, consisted of a single rotating module. It is believed to work with a ground version of the Barak-8 Surface to Air missile system.

== Operators ==
Israel

The IDF employs several variants of the MMR as an air defense and artillery detection radar, and Fire Control Radar for its air defense systems. Quantity unknown.

The Radar was declared operational in 2010 and is operated as the main Fire ranging component of the Israeli Artillery Corps' spotting battalion.

The ELM 2084 is an essential component in the Israeli Hostile Weapon Locating, Aerial Surveillance and Early Warning architecture – providing a constant coverage of the Israeli borders both In peacetime and in Israel's recent conflicts.

ELM 2084 Radars are used on the IDF's Iron Dome and David's Sling air defense systems as Fire Control Radars, with an advertised capability to process dozens of threats simultaneously. A notable success rate of 90 percent of over 1000 interceptions is reported for the Iron Dome system.

Azerbaijan

Azerbaijan has employed ELM-2084 since at least 2019.

Canada

Canada has purchased ten ELM-2084 Multi-Mission Radars. They are expected to enter operational service late 2020 with the designation AN/MPQ-504.

ELM-2084 MMR radar of the Cyprus National Guard (on Tatra T815 10x10 truck).

Cyprus

ELM-2084 MMR radars in operation with the Cyprus National Guard as part of the Barak MX missile defence system.

Czech Republic

Czech Army purchased 8 radars, the first ELM-2084 MMR was delivered in April 2022. After difficulties with the system and lack of delivered manuals for the system by ELTA it passed the army tests on 21 April 2023. 5 radars are stationary and 3 mobile as a back-up. Additional 4 mobile radars serve as part of SPYDER LR batteries.

Finland

Finland has purchased a "significant" number of ELM-2311 radars for mainly counter-battery use in 2019, with deliveries scheduled for 2021. They are to be used also for secondary air surveillance purposes. The radar system was tested in summer 2018, and was deemed the best of the systems which FDF had selected for the competition.

Hungary

On December 11, 2020 the Hungarian government announced they have ordered multiple (5+6) ELM-2084 radar systems from Israel Aerospace Industries with Rheinmetall's Canadian subsidiary providing sales and integration and Rheinmetall Canada also establishing assembly and future manufacturing as well as system development in Hungary. The unknown number of various M-MMR and F-MMR configuration are expected to start replacing Soviet-made but modernized P-37, PRV-17 and ST-68U locators from 2022, serving as both augmenting the RAT-31DL-based backbone of NATO airspace surveillance and Hungary's national air defense network, as well as providing state-of-the-art counter-battery capabilities for artillery regiments of the Hungarian Defence Forces.

India

India operates the MF-STAR naval radar, quantity unknown.

Singapore

ELM 2084 are used by the Singapore Armed Forces for air surveillance and air defense roles. Quantity unknown.
ELM 2311 are mounted on Bronco ATTC as the 'SAFARI' radar.

Vietnam

Acquired with SPYDER air-defense systems, sources claim that they are the ELM-2084 MMR variant. Publicised pictures showed that there was at least one system was commissioned and operated.
