= Missile farm =

Type of ballistic missile site

A missile farm is a type of ballistic missile site where many launch platforms and their associated logistics are gathered in a single cluster dispersed over a large area. The idea was initially explored by the United States for housing and protecting many LGM-30 Minuteman ICBMs during the Cold War, but the concept was abandoned for more dispersed launch locations. The idea has since been proposed a few more times in the US and put into practice by a few other nuclear-armed and non-nuclear nations.

== Background ==
One of the primary objectives of a nuclear first strike is the destruction of a sufficient amount of an enemy's nuclear capabilities to limit their ability to respond in kind. Because of this, one of the most important aspects of nuclear warfare is the protection of missile silos, mobile launchers, and other launch platforms like ballistic missile submarines. For land-based ICBMs, there are various methods to defend missile silos, not all of which are equally effective.

=== Active defense ===
Active methods of ballistic missile defense include kinetic and explosive ground-based interceptors (GBIs), which are a safer method of destroying incoming missiles but are difficult and expensive to deploy in large numbers. For example, as of 2024, Israel's Iron Dome air-defense system costs US$40,000-50,000 per interception, and more advanced systems can cost in the millions per interception. Kinetic interceptors also suffer issues of accuracy due to needing to directly impact the incoming missile, and they aren't any cheaper than their explosive counterparts. For instance, the canceled US Kinetic Energy Interceptor program was estimated to cost US$75 million per unit. Another commonly-proposed method of active ballistic missile defense is by using high-energy lasers to destroy missiles in-flight. However, these also suffer from the more unique issue of electricity consumption and overheating as well as the issue of deploying such a system en-masse. However, shorter-range laser systems such as Israel's Iron Beam have shown promise in effectiveness and cost efficiency.

A video showing Israel's Iron Dome air-defense system intercepting incoming rockets.

=== Passive defense ===
Passive methods of ballistic missile defense include aspects of the design, location, arrangement, and other factors around a missile silo's construction. Most missile silos and their command centers are constructed as 'hardened' bunkers located underground to reduce the damage caused by indirect missile strikes.

For example, the Cheyenne Mountain Complex in Colorado, United States serves as the defensive headquarters of the North American Aerospace Defence Command (NORAD) and United States Northern Command (USNORTHCOM). The complex is located within the granite Cheyenne Mountain and is expected to withstand a nuclear electromagnetic pulse and a 30-megaton nuclear explosion as close as 1.2 miles away.

The Soviet Union also employed hardened, dispersed silos, some of which could be operated unmanned.

== Overview ==
The concept behind a missile farm is one of passive defense. Typically, missile launch platforms are spread throughout different areas of a country to make it more difficult for them to be destroyed simultaneously. For instance, the United States has hardened silos located across five separate states in the midwest, and Russia has ICBM silos spanning their entire territory. However, a missile farm configuration involves large amounts or all of a country's land-based nuclear capabilities in one area.

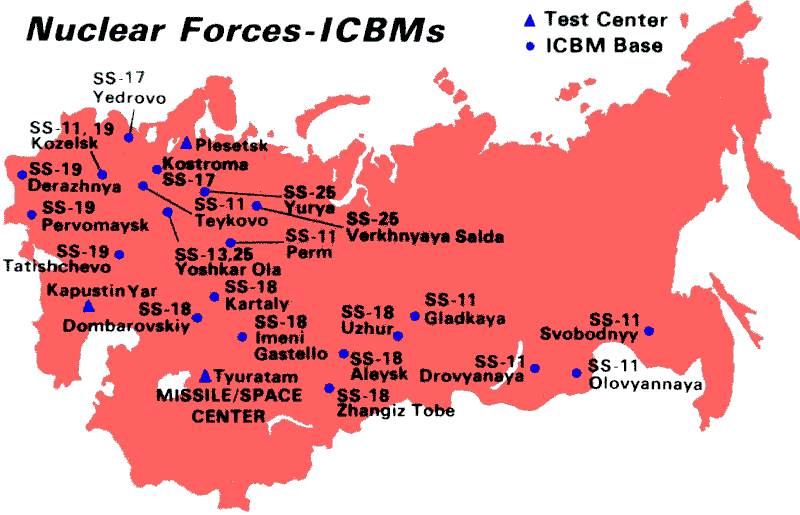
Soviet-era missile silos are spread throughout Russian territory and in the former Soviet Republics. Map c. 2000.

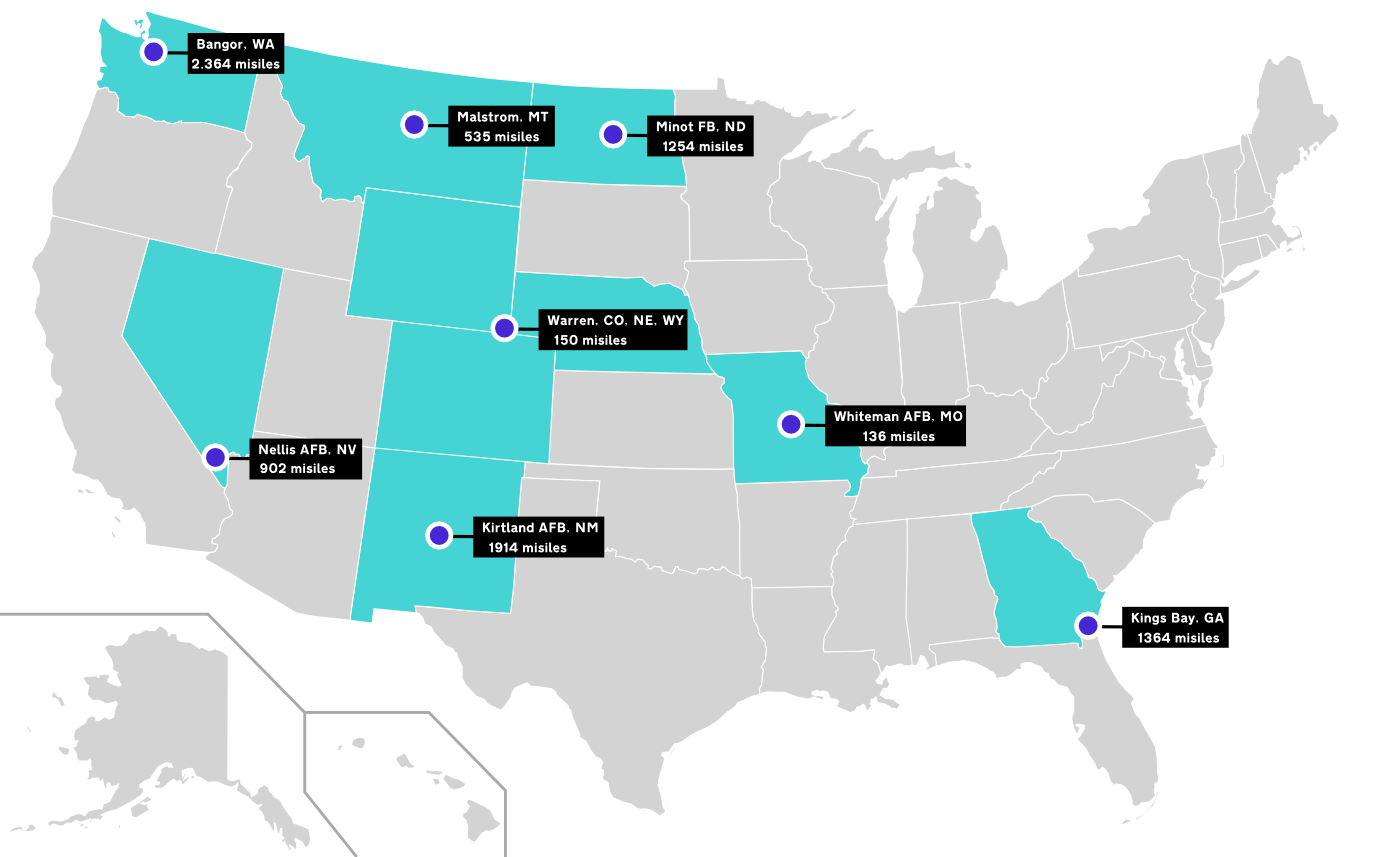
The United States has missile silos and other launch platforms spread across multiple states, many of which are in the northwest. This location reduced the range to the Soviet Union while protecting them from enemy missile submarines off the coast.

== By country ==
=== United States ===
The United States Air Force considered the idea of using a missile farm first during the deployment for their Minuteman and Peacekeeper ICBMs in the early 1960s. The proposal involved concentrating up to 1,500 missiles in one area, however it was quickly rejected in favor of limiting missile concentration to around fifty missiles in one area with launch sites dispersed across five states.

=== Iran ===
In July 2020, during the Great Prophet XIV military exercise, Iran unveiled a new launch platform called the "Missile Farm" that maintained missiles in a ready-to-launch state, buried to decrease the threat of enemy preemptive strikes, similar to the U.S. LGM-118A Peacekeeper platform. Increased cost effectiveness was claimed by maintaining launch sites that functioned without additional storage facilities, equipment, and personnel. Employing the platform reduced the risk of detection by an enemy's ISTAR systems, and demonstrated enhanced Iranian air defenses and strike capabilities, using camouflage.

Since 2015 Iran has touted its construction of subterranean missile assembly and launch sites for foreign and domestic propaganda. Iranian officials have been quoted as calling these sites "missile farms" and "missile cities". These silos reportedly house Iranian ballistic missiles like the Qiam 1, Fateh-110, Shabab, Ghadr, and possibly the Zolfaghar and Dezful as well. Missiles from these silos were used in the 2024 operations True Promise I and True Promise II against Israel. In 2025, it was reported that Iran maintains hidden missile farms.

== See also ==
- LGM-30_Minuteman
- Missile guidance
- Missile launch facility
