= Iron Dome =

Israeli air defense system

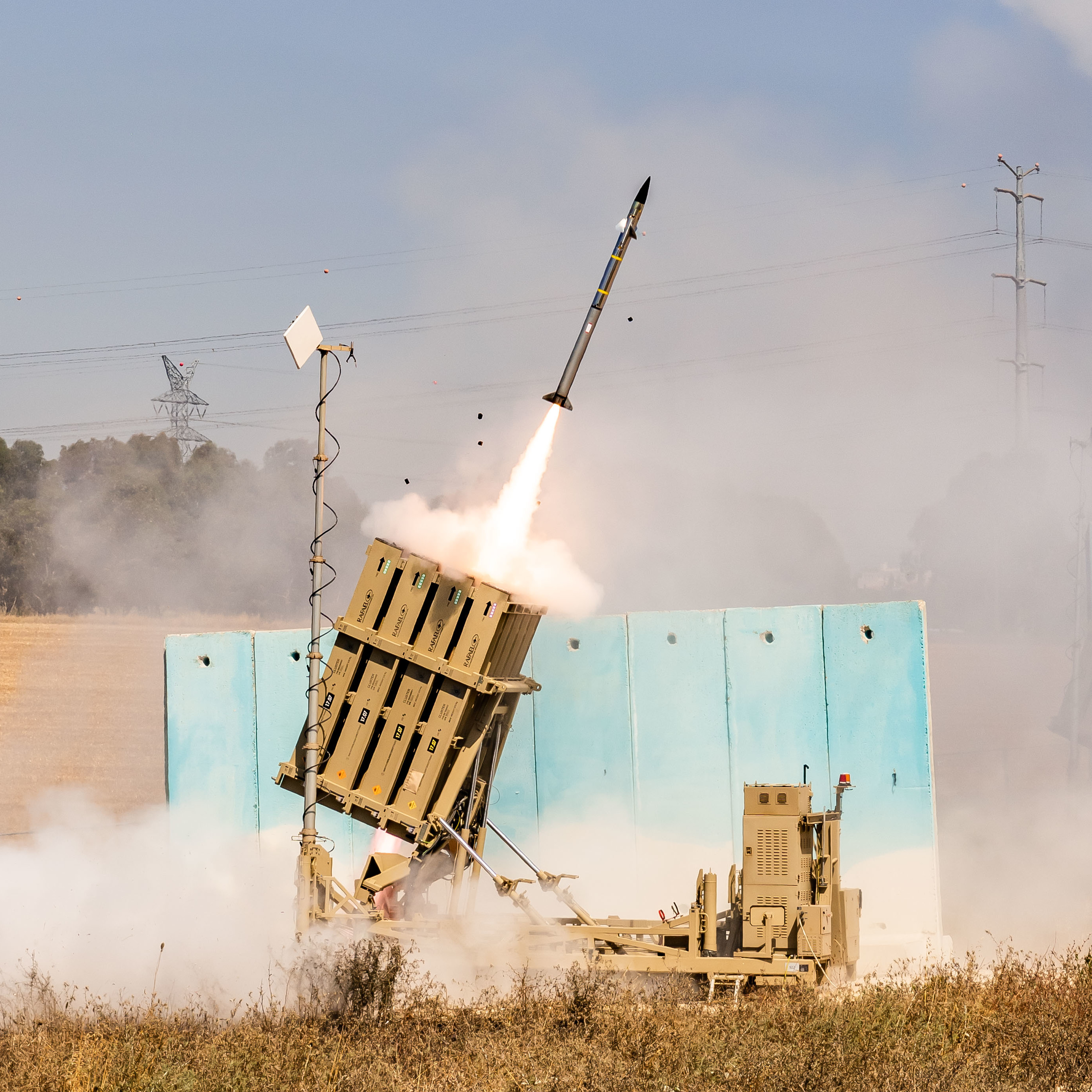
- Iron Dome launches an interceptor, 2021.
- Type: Counter rocket, artillery, and mortar (C-RAM) and short range air defence system
- Place of origin: Israel

Service history
- In service: 2011–present
- Used by: Israel Defense Forces
- Wars: Gaza–Israel conflict (2011, 2012, 2021); Operation Pillar of Defense; Operation Protective Edge; Sinai insurgency; 2021 Israel–Palestine crisis; Operation Breaking Dawn; Operation Shield and Arrow; Gaza war; 2024 Iran–Israel conflict; Twelve-Day War; 2026 Iran war

Production history
- Designer: Rafael Advanced Defense Systems; Israel Aerospace Industries
- Designed: 2005
- Manufacturer: Rafael Advanced Defense Systems; Israel Aerospace Industries
- Unit cost: $50 million per battery $100,000–150,000 per interception
- Produced: 2011–present
- No. built: 10 batteries deployed (planned deployment is 15)

Specifications
- Mass: 90 kg (200 lb)
- Length: 3 m (9 ft 10 in)
- Diameter: 160 mm (6.3 in)
- Detonation mechanism: Proximity fuze
- Maximum speed: Mach 2.2
- Launch platform: Three/four launchers, each carrying 20 interceptors.

Short video about Iron Dome from the Israeli News Company

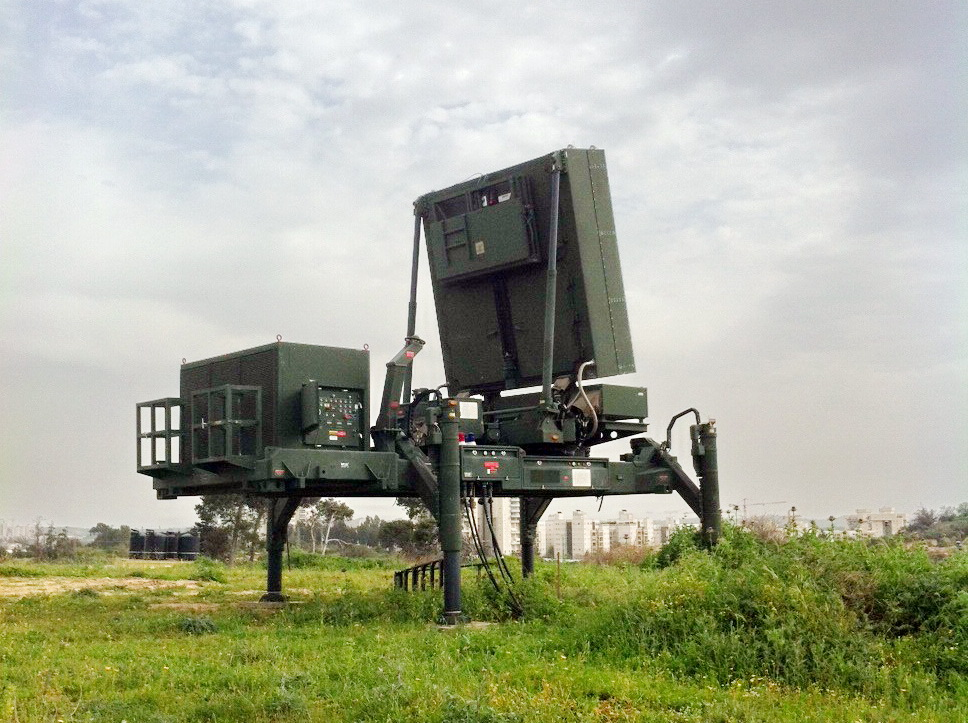
The EL/M-2084 active electronically scanned array scaled down derivative radar of the Iron Dome

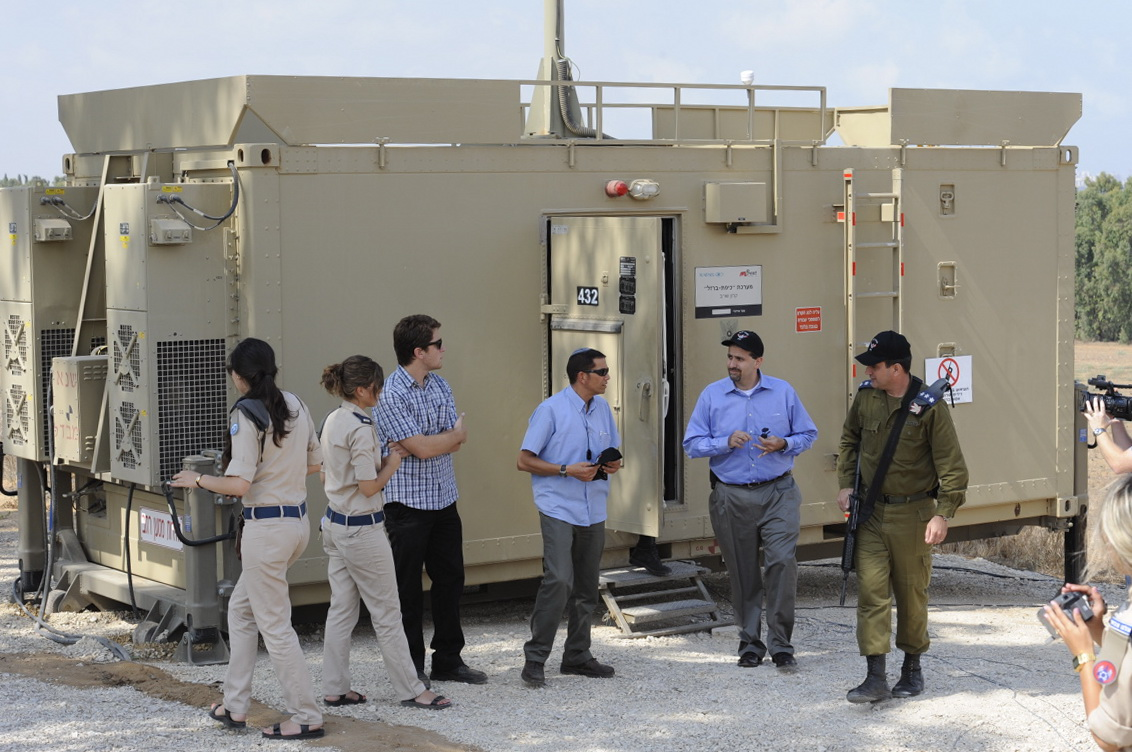
US Ambassador Dan Shapiro visits the Battle Management & Control (BMC) unit of the Iron Dome in 2011.

The Iron Dome (Hebrew: כִּפַּת בַּרְזֶל, romanized: Kippat Barzel) is an Israeli mobile all-weather air defense system, developed by Rafael Advanced Defense Systems and Israel Aerospace Industries. The system is designed to intercept and destroy short-range rockets and artillery shells fired from distances of 4 to 70 kilometres (2–43 mi) away and whose trajectory would take them to an Israeli populated area. From 2011 to 2021, the United States contributed a total of US$1.6 billion to the Iron Dome defense system, with another US$1 billion approved by the US Congress in 2022.

Iron Dome was declared operational and initially deployed on 27 March 2011 near Beersheba. On 7 April 2011, the system successfully intercepted a rocket launched from Gaza for the first time. On 10 March 2012, The Jerusalem Post reported that the system shot down 90% of rockets launched from Gaza that would have landed in populated areas. In late 2012, Israel said that it hoped to increase the range of Iron Dome's interceptions, from a maximum of 70 to 250 kilometres (43–155 mi) and make it more versatile so that it could intercept rockets coming from two directions simultaneously.

In November 2012, official statements indicated that it had intercepted over 400 rockets. By late October 2014, the Iron Dome systems had intercepted over 1,200 rockets. In addition to their land-based deployment, it was reported in 2017 that Iron Dome batteries would in future be deployed at sea on Sa'ar 6-class corvettes, to protect offshore gas platforms in conjunction with Israel's Barak 8 missile system. On 11 May 2026, US Ambassador to Israel Mike Huckabee disclosed that Israel has sent Iron Dome batteries and "personnel to help operate them" to the UAE to counter Iranian assaults.

== Background ==
Hezbollah, based in Lebanon, fired rockets into northern Israeli population centers in the 1990s, posing a security challenge for the Israel Defense Forces. In the years following Israel's Ministry of Defense's Research and Development department floating the idea of a short-range antimissile system until its later U.S. September 2009 assessment, Iron Dome was met with unanimous skepticism by U.S. defense officials due to their country's cheaper and more accurate (Note: The Phalanx system had a probability of hit of 70–80% compared to the prior to the end of 2007 assessment in the Iron Dome review process of low teens.) Vulcan Phalanx system and near-unanimous skepticism by Israeli top counterparts.

In 2004, the idea for Iron Dome gained momentum with the installation of Brig. Gen. Daniel Gold as the head of the research and development bureau of the Israel Defense Forces (IDF). Gold was a strong backer of the antimissile project, even skirting army contracting regulations to secure financing. He also helped persuade key politicians to support the project.

During the 2006 Second Lebanon War, approximately 4,000 Hezbollah-fired rockets (the great majority of which were short-range Katyusha rockets) landed in northern Israel, including on Haifa, the country's third largest city. The rocket barrage killed 44 Israeli civilians and caused some 250,000 Israeli citizens to evacuate and relocate to other parts of Israel while an estimated 1 million Israelis were confined in or near bomb shelters during the conflict.

To the south, more than 8,000 projectiles (estimated at 4,000 rockets and 4,000 mortar bombs) were fired indiscriminately into Israel from Gaza between 2000 and 2008, principally by Hamas. Almost all of the rockets fired were Qassams launched by 122 mm Grad launchers smuggled into the Gaza Strip, giving longer range than other launch methods. Nearly a million Israelis living in the south were within rocket range, posing a serious security threat to the country and its citizens.

In February 2007, Defense Minister Amir Peretz selected Iron Dome as Israel's defense against this short-range rocket threat. Since then, the $210 million system has been developed by Rafael Advanced Defense Systems working jointly with the IDF.

In May 2021 it was estimated that Palestinian militant groups had an arsenal of about 30,000 rockets and mortar bombs in Gaza, all of which could be potential targets for Iron Dome if fired. Range varies widely, and guidance systems are lacking, but accuracy has improved over the years.

== Name ==
Project leader Colonel S. and his team in the Administration for the Development of Weapons and Technological Infrastructure (Maf'at) needed an appropriate name for the system. According to Colonel S.

The first name I thought of was 'Anti-Qassam', but when the project started to move forward I realized it was problematic... I sat down with my wife, and together we thought of suitable names. She suggested the name 'Tamir' (Hebrew acronym for טיל מיירט, Til Meyaret, 'interceptor missile') for the missile, and for the system itself we thought of 'Golden Dome'. The following Sunday, 'Tamir' was immediately approved, but there was a problem with 'Golden Dome'—it could be perceived as ostentatious. So it was changed to 'Iron Dome'.

== Specifications ==
The system is designed to counter short-range rockets and 155 mm artillery shells with a range of up to 70 kilometers (43 mi). According to its manufacturer, Iron Dome will operate day and night, under adverse weather conditions, and can respond to multiple threats simultaneously.

Iron Dome has three central components:

- Detection & Tracking Radar: the radar system is built by Elta, an Israeli defense company and subsidiary of Israel Aerospace Industries, and by the IDF.
- Battle Management & Weapon Control (BMC): the control center is built for Rafael by mPrest Systems, an Israeli software company.
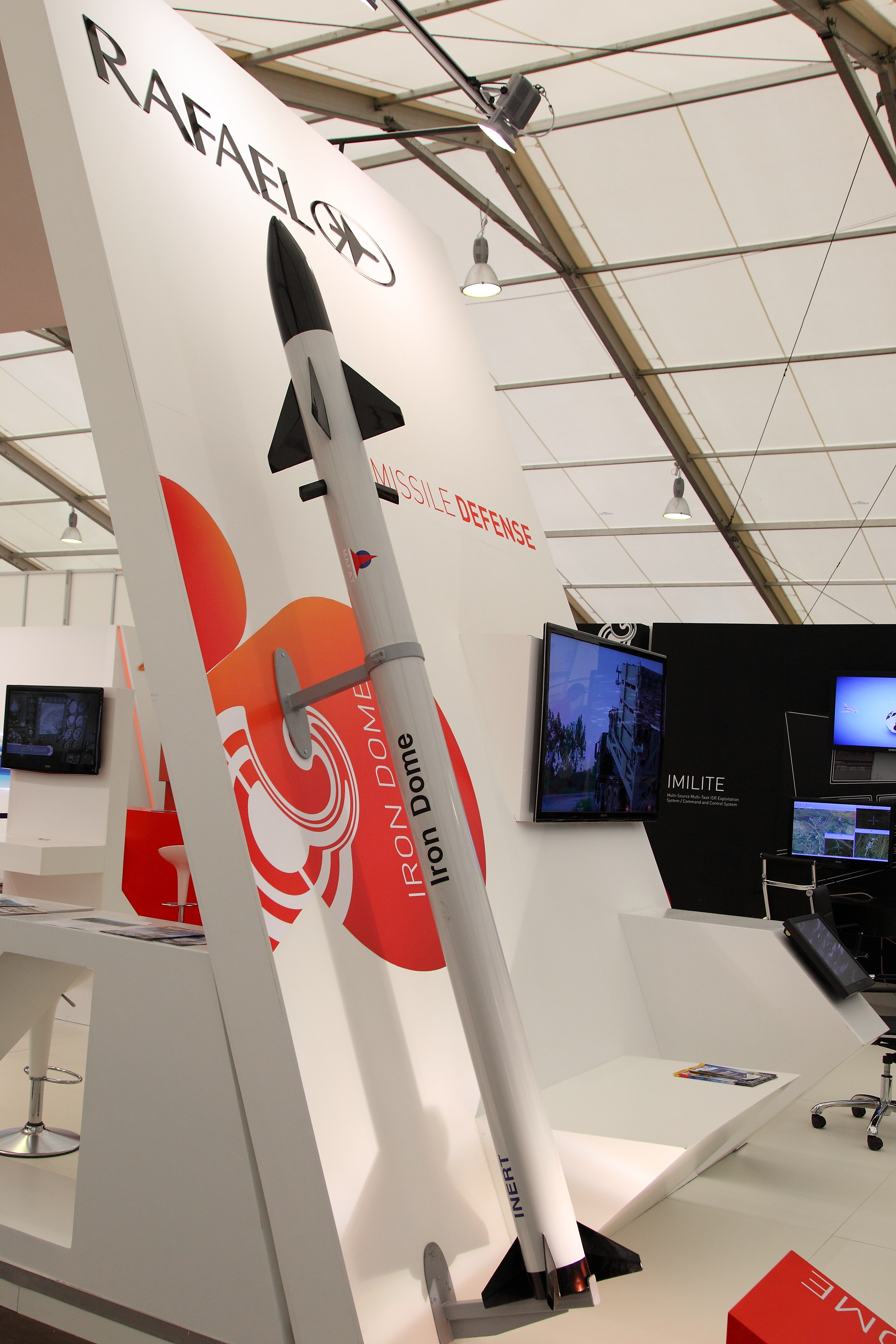
- An example of an interceptor missile used by Iron Dome
  Missile Firing Unit: the unit launches the Tamir interceptor missile, equipped with electro-optic sensors and several steering fins for high maneuverability. The missile is built by Rafael. A typical Iron Dome battery has 3–4 launchers (20 missiles per launcher).

The system's radar is referred to as EL/M-2084. It detects the rocket's launch and tracks its trajectory. The BMC calculates the impact point according to the reported data, and uses this information to determine whether the target constitutes a threat to a designated area. Only when that threat is determined, an interceptor missile is fired to destroy the incoming rocket before it reaches the predicted impact area.

=== Comparison to a typical battery ===
The typical air defense missile battery consists of a radar unit, missile control unit, and several launchers, all located at the same site.

Conversely, Iron Dome is built to deploy in a scattered pattern. Each launcher, containing 20 interceptors, is independently deployed and operated remotely via a secure wireless connection. Reportedly, each Iron Dome battery is capable of protecting an urban area of approximately 150 square kilometres (58 sq mi).

== Funding ==
The initial funding and development of the Iron Dome system was provided and undertaken by Israel. This allowed for the deployment of the first two Iron Dome systems. Subsequently, funding for additional Iron Dome systems—along with repeated funding for the supply of the interception missiles—has been provided by the United States. From 2011 to 2021, the US contributed a total of US$1.6 billion to the Iron Dome defense system, with another US$1 billion approved by the US Congress in 2022.

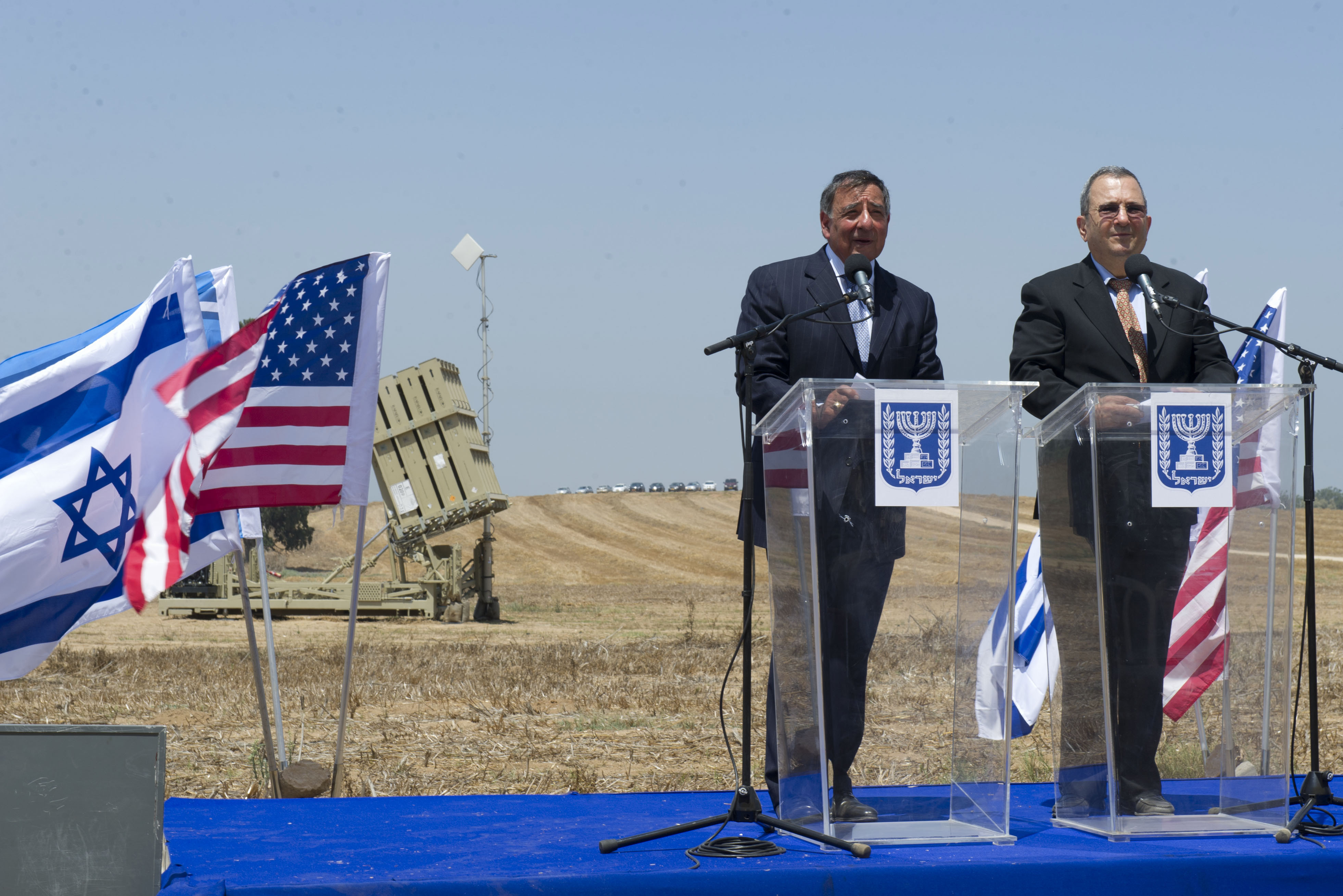
Panetta at the Iron Dome on 1 August 2012

Funding for the production and deployment of these additional Iron Dome batteries and interceptor missiles was approved by the United States Congress, after being requested by President Barack Obama in 2010. In May 2010, the White House announced that Obama would seek $205 million from Congress in his 2011 budget, to spur the production and deployment of additional Iron Dome batteries. White House spokesman Tommy Vietor stated, "The president recognizes the threat missiles and rockets fired by Hamas and Hezbollah pose to Israelis, and has therefore decided to seek funding from Congress to support the production of Israel's short range rocket defense system called Iron Dome." This would be the first direct U.S. investment in the project. Such financial assistance could expedite the completion of the defensive system, which has long been delayed by budgetary shortfalls. A few days later, on 20 May 2010, the U.S. House of Representatives approved the funding in a 410–4 vote. The bill, the United States–Israel Missile Defense Cooperation and Support Act (H.R. 5327), was sponsored by Representative Glenn C. Nye of Virginia. This money was expected to be included in the 2011 budget. Once the money was received in 2011, it still took a further 18 months before the additional batteries were delivered to the air force.

On 9 May 2011, Haaretz published that Defense Ministry director general Maj. Gen. (res.) Udi Shani said that Israel plans to invest nearly $1 billion in the coming years for the development and production of Iron Dome batteries. "We are no longer approaching this in terms of initial operational capabilities but are defining the final target for absorbing the systems, in terms of schedule and funds. We are talking about [having] 10–15 Iron Dome batteries. We will invest nearly $1 billion on this. This is the goal, in addition to the $205 million that the U.S. government has authorized," Shani said.

On 4 April 2012, Reuters reported that a senior Israeli official, during a briefing to a small group of journalists on condition of anonymity, predicted an increased interception range of up to 250 kilometres (160 mi), as well as more flexible aiming of Iron Dome units, thus lowering the number of batteries needed for full deployment in Israel. That would help Israel to cope with the prospect of reduced funding from the United States, while a "new round" of talks about missile-defense funding would be completed in two to three months, he anticipated. While praising American largesse, the official said US planners have asked Israel to "point out honestly where the upper limit is in terms of what can be implemented" with the Iron Dome. He said the US is "deep in (fiscal) challenges itself", so it does not want to "give money for the sake of it".

In exchange for the second tranche of deployment funding, the United States asked Israel for access to, and a stake in, elements of the system's technology.

On 17 May 2012, when Israeli Defense Minister Ehud Barak met with U.S. Secretary of Defense Leon Panetta, the Pentagon issued a statement from the Secretary saying in part, "I was pleased to inform Minister Barak that the President supports Israel's Iron Dome system and directed me to fill the $70 million in assistance for Iron Dome that Minister Barak indicated to me Israel needs this fiscal year."

On 18 May 2012, the House of Representatives passed the Fiscal Year 2013 National Defense Authorization Act, H.R. 4310, with $680 million for Iron Dome in Section 227. The report accompanying the bill, 112–479, also calls for technology sharing as well as co-production of Iron Dome in the United States in light of the nearly $900 million invested in the system since 2011.

Section 227, Iron Dome Short-range Rocket Defense Program, would authorize $680.0 million for the Iron Dome system in fiscal years 2012–15 in PE 63913C for procurement of additional batteries and interceptors, and for operations and sustainment expenses. This section would also require the Director, Missile Defense Agency to establish within MDA a program office for cooperative missile defense efforts on the Iron Dome system to ensure long-term cooperation on this program. The committee is aware that National Defense Authorization Act for Fiscal Year 2011 (Public Law 111-383) included $205.0 million for the Iron Dome short-range rocket defense system for the State of Israel. The committee notes that the Iron Dome system has proven very effective at defeating threat rockets launched at protected targets. The committee also notes that if the full $680.0 million is used on the program, the total U.S. taxpayer investment in this system will amount to nearly $900.0 million since fiscal year 2011, yet the United States has no rights to the technology involved. The committee believes the Director should ensure, prior to disbursing the authorized $680 million for Iron Dome, that the United States has appropriate rights to this technology for United States defense purposes, subject to an agreement with the Israeli Missile Defense Organization, and in a manner consistent with prior U.S.–Israeli missile defense cooperation on the Arrow and David's Sling suite of systems. The committee also believes that the Director should explore any opportunity to enter into co-production of the Iron Dome system with Israel, in light of the significant U.S. investment in this system.

On 4 June 2012, the U.S. Senate Armed Services Committee included $210 million for Iron Dome, in its version of the National Defense Authorization Act for 2013, S.3254. The bill has been reported out of committee and is waiting to be assigned a date for consideration by the full Senate.

Sec. 237, Availability of Funds for Iron Dome Short Range Rocket Defense Program, said that of the amounts authorized to be appropriated for fiscal year 2013 by section 201 for research, development, test, and evaluation, defense-wide, and available for the Missile Defense Agency, $210,000,000 may be provided to the Government of Israel for the Iron Dome short-range rocket defense program as specified in the funding table in section 4201.

On 17 January 2014, Obama signed the fiscal year 2014 Consolidated Appropriations Act. The bill provides $235 million for Israel to procure the Iron Dome system. The Israeli government has also agreed to spend more than half the funds the United States provides for the Iron Dome system in the United States. Funds going to U.S. contractors will increase to 30 percent in 2014 and 55 percent in 2015 from 3 percent previously, according to a U.S. Missile Defense Agency report to Congress.

On 1 August 2014, Congress approved a measure to deliver an additional $225 million in aid to Israel, with the aim of replenishing funds for the Iron Dome system in the midst of the conflict between Israel and Hamas. Following the signing of bill, for which "the Senate and House of Representatives as well as Republicans and Democrats set[ting] aside differences to advance Israel's emergency request," the White House stated that "The United States has been clear since the start of this conflict that no country can abide rocket attacks against its civilians" and that it "supports Israel's right to defend itself against such attacks." Senate Report 113-211 from the U.S. Government Publishing Office, which accompanied text H.R. 4870, recommended an increase in funding for the program for FY2015. The report calculates "U.S. investment in Iron Dome production since fiscal year 2011" to be over $1 billion.

Until the 2021 war in Gaza, the US had contributed a total of US$1.6 billion to the Iron Dome defense system. After the end of the 2021 conflict, Israel asked the US for another US$1 billion for replenishing the Iron Dome batteries, which was approved by the US Congress in 2022.

== Co-production with the United States ==
With the United States on track to greatly increase funding for Iron Dome, there have been calls for technology transfer and co-production of Iron Dome in the United States. In fact by August 2011 the joint-venture (JV) was announced to market a variant of this system. The JV is known as Area Protection Systems. Just as the US and Israel share co-production of the Arrow 3 missile system, with Boeing manufacturing 40–50 percent of the production content, there was support in the U.S. Congress, media and think tanks in favor of co-production. The U.S. House of Representatives included report language in its FY-2013 Defense Authorization Act supporting Iron Dome with $680 million but also instructing that the Director of the U.S. Missile Defense Agency, Lt. Gen. Patrick O'Reilly, "should explore any opportunity to enter into co-production of the Iron Dome system with Israel, in light of the significant U.S. investment in this system." There were media reports that the Pentagon was requesting similar language in the Senate Defense Authorization Act as well as the respective House and Senate defense appropriations bills for 2013. Adding Iron Dome to the list of high-tech military programs built jointly by both nations would help further strengthen ties between Israel and the United States.

In July 2014 it was announced that Raytheon would be the major U.S. partner in co-production of major components for the Iron Dome's Tamir intercepting missile. The U.S. firm was to supply components through various subcontractors. Rafael and Raytheon had teamed to offer the Iron Dome launcher and Tamir interceptor, known as SkyHunter in the U.S., to the U.S. Army as part of its Indirect Fires Protection Capability (IFPC) system, but Dynetics was instead chosen offering a launcher based on the Multi-Mission Launcher firing the AIM-9X Sidewinder.

In September 2014 Raytheon was awarded a $150 million contract to produce parts for the Tamir. Plants in Tucson and Huntsville, Alabama were to benefit, along with two other Arizona companies.

By July 2015 the Arizona plant had entered full production.

In August 2020 the JV partners agreed to make a plant investment, in Tucson.

On 12 October 2023 the US loaned Israel some units in consequence of the October 7 attacks. Two weeks later the JV partners announced a new Tamir missile plant investment of value $33 million in East Camden, Arkansas, to serve the US Marine Corps, in what was known as the Medium Range Intercept Capability programme. In February 2024 the JV partners broke ground on this investment.

== Development ==
=== Design ===
In 2005, Brig. Gen. Danny Gold, then head of Maf'at, decided to start the program that would include the system's research and a demonstration of the intercepting system. In 2007, Israel commissioned the development of Iron Dome, choosing Israeli contractor Rafael over the American giant Lockheed Martin. Israeli company mPrest Systems was put in charge of programming the core of Iron Dome's battle management system. Iron Dome went from the drawing board to combat readiness within less than four years, a remarkably short period of time for a weapons system designed from scratch, according to military experts.

There was no system like this, anywhere in the world, in terms of capabilities, speed, accuracy. We felt like a start-up.

— Eyal Ron, a manager at mPrest

According to the leading developers of Iron Dome, due to schedule and low-cost settings constraints, some of the missile components have been taken from a toy car sold by Toys "R" Us.

=== Testing ===
- July 2008: the Tamir interceptor missile underwent successful testing.
- March 2009: Israel successfully tested the missile defense system, though without yet actually intercepting an actual projectile.
- July 2009: the system successfully intercepted a number of rockets mimicking Qassam and short-range Katyusha rockets in a Defense Ministry test.
- August 2009: the IDF completed the establishment of a new battalion that will operate the Iron Dome system. The battalion is a part of the Israel Air Force's Air Defense Division. The system was to be first deployed along the Gaza border and then along the border with Lebanon. The system was slated to start operating in mid-2010.
- January 2010: Iron Dome successfully intercepted multiple rocket barrages mimicking Qassams and Katyushas. Defense Ministry Director-General Pinhas Buchris stated that the system would ultimately "transform" security for the residents of southern and northern Israel.
- July 2010: The system successfully intercepted multiple rocket barrages mimicking Qassams and Katyushas. During the test, Iron Dome successfully distinguished rockets which were threats from those that would not land in designated areas and did not need to be intercepted.
- March 2011: Iron Dome was declared operational by the IDF, and Defense Minister Ehud Barak authorized deployment.

During the first stage of Iron Dome's operational duty, the Israeli Air Force included many soldiers from Sderot, citing high motivation among the city's pre-army youth to be part of the project. The 947th "Marksmen" Stinger Battalion of the Israeli Air Defense Network was chosen as the first unit to become familiar with and operate Iron Dome.

=== Energy weapons ===
Although Iron Dome has proven its effectiveness against rocket attacks, Defense Ministry officials are concerned it will not be able to handle more massive arsenals possessed by Hezbollah in Lebanon should a conflict arise. Although in Operation Protective Edge it had a 90 percent hit rate against only rockets determined to be headed for populated areas, 735 intercepts were made at a cost of $70,000–100,000 per interceptor; with an estimated 100,000 rockets possessed by Hezbollah, Iron Dome systems could be fiscally and physically overwhelmed by dozens of incoming salvos. In 2014 directed-energy weapons were being investigated as a complement to Iron Dome, with lower system cost and lower cost per shot. Solid-state lasers worldwide have power levels ranging from 10 to 40 kW; to destroy a rocket safely from 15–20 km (9.3–12.4 mi) away, several low-power beams could coordinate and converge on one spot to burn through its outer shell and destroy it. Because laser beams become distorted and ineffective in foggy or heavy cloud conditions, any laser weapon would need to be complemented by Iron Dome.

In 1996, the Israelis developed the Nautilus prototype and later deployed it in Kiryat Shmona, Israel's northernmost city along the Lebanese border. It used a collection of components from other systems and succeeded in keeping a beam on the same point for two continuous seconds using an early prototype of the Green Pine radar. Nautilus succeeded in its goal to prove the concept was feasible, but it was never deployed operationally, as the government believed that sending in ground troops to stop rocket fire at source was more cost-effective.

At the 2014 Singapore Air Show, Rafael unveiled its Iron Beam laser air-defense system. Iron Beam is a directed-energy weapon made to complement the Iron Dome system by using a high-energy laser to destroy rockets, mortar bombs, and other airborne threats. Development of the system began some time after the joint United States and Israel Nautilus laser development program ended.

In December 2014, former Israeli Air Force chief and head of Boeing Israel David Ivry showed interest in the American Laser Weapon System (LaWS). Earlier that month, the U.S. Navy had revealed that the LaWS had been mounted on the USS Ponce and locked onto and destroyed designated targets with near-instantaneous lethality, with each laser shot costing less than $1.

In February 2022, Israeli Prime Minister Naftali Bennett announced that a ground-based laser system would begin deployment within a year, first as a trial and then operationally. The system will first be deployed to the south of the country to areas most under threat from rockets fired from the Gaza Strip; the ultimate goal is for Israel to be surrounded by a "laser wall" to protect from rockets, missiles, and UAVs. While lasers are cheaper to fire per shot, they can be impacted by weather, have a slow rate of fire, and have less range. Therefore, they will be used in conjunction with Iron Dome in situations where they can reduce overall interception costs. A procurement contract for the Iron Beam system was signed the next month, however the schedule for fielding was revealed to be delayed for several years.

=== C-Dome ===
In October 2014, Rafael unveiled a naval version of the Iron Dome called C-Dome. It is designed to protect vessels in blue and littoral waters from ballistic trajectory and direct attack weapons fired in saturation attacks. C-Dome includes a 10-round canister loaded with vertically launched Tamir interceptors for 360-degree coverage, a feature not supported by the land-based Iron Dome system; the ship's own surveillance radar is used to negate the need for a dedicated fire control radar. The system has a small footprint to enable installation on small ships like offshore patrol vessels, corvettes, and even stationary oil rigs. In the very early stages of concept development, Rafael estimated that it could take less than a year to build a prototype C-Dome system. Preliminary discussions with potential users have already been launched. The C-Dome will be used on the Israeli Navy's Sa'ar 6-class corvettes. On 18 May 2016 Col. Ariel Shir, head of Israeli Naval operation systems announced that the system had successfully intercepted and destroyed a salvo of short range missiles while deployed on a naval vessel at sea. On 27 November 2017, the Israeli military declared initial operational capability for the C-Dome, completing more than 18 months of integration and design work.

=== Counter-UAV ===
The Iron Dome has been pitched to the IDF as a more cost-effective anti-aircraft system to intercept unmanned aerial vehicles. Some estimates of the cost of a Tamir interceptor are around $100,000, but it is still 95 percent cheaper than using a MIM-104 Patriot, the primary Israeli interceptor, costing $2–3 million. Although the Patriot has broader coverage, the low cost of UAVs and operational scenarios they would be encountered in would make Iron Dome equally effective against them. No material upgrades would be needed to optimize the system for drone-killing missions, as this role and capability has been publicized from its inception.

In July 2015, Rafael released video footage of Iron Dome interceptors destroying several low and high-flying UAVs in a test. Although some targets were destroyed by proximity-operated warheads, in others the interceptor achieved a kinetic hit. The company says the system is capable of destroying armed UAVs before they can get close enough to release their munitions, and most medium-altitude reconnaissance UAVs before they are close enough to survey an area.

=== Other uses ===
In June 2016, it was revealed that the Iron Dome had been tested to successfully intercept salvos of artillery shells, which are typically difficult to destroy because of the need to penetrate the thickness of their metal casings to get to the warhead, and "multiple" air-to-ground precision guided munitions (PGMs) similar to the Joint Direct Attack Munition (JDAM).

== Deployment ==
The Iron Dome system began operating in early 2011, initially deployed at air force bases in southern Israel. It was designated to be set up in other areas, such as the town of Sderot, during significant escalations along the Gaza border.

=== 2011 ===
On 27 March 2011, Al Jazeera English reported that Iron Dome had been deployed for the first time. Brigadier-General Doron Gavish, commander of Israel's air defense corps, said Iron Dome had passed a series of tests and reached its "evaluation phase" in the field. It was stationed near Beersheba, following two rocket attacks on the area that month.

On 7 April 2011, after deployment as an "operational experiment" on 3 April, the Iron Dome system in the area of Ashkelon successfully intercepted a Grad rocket fired at the city, the first time a short-range rocket fired from Gaza had been intercepted. According to reports from the area, the interception could be seen in Israeli towns near northern Gaza. Immediately afterwards an IAF aircraft successfully attacked the squad that had fired the rocket. Later that day the IDF stressed that the system, though operational, was still under evaluation. On 8 April the system successfully intercepted another four rockets.

On 12 April, the IDF announced it would accelerate the introduction of a third Iron Dome battery. According to Haaretz, IDF officials indicated that the security establishment intended to ensure that the third battery would become available in six months, instead of the expected 18 months. According to the new plan, launchers from existing systems would be combined with other components that had already been manufactured to speed up the battery's production. In that way, the first operational Iron Dome battalion would come into being within six months, with batteries that could be deployed in the south or in other arenas.

Also according to Haaretz, the IDF was to finalize its long-term Iron Dome acquisition program—nicknamed "Halamish"—within a few months (from April 2011), which would indicate the final number of systems to be introduced into the military. Israel Air Force officials estimated the number of Iron Dome systems needed to cover threatened areas as thirteen. According to Meir Elran, a scholar at the Institute of National Security Studies in Tel Aviv, Israel would need a total of 20 batteries to provide adequate defense for its borders with Gaza and Lebanon. Such a deployment would require financial assistance from the United States, but he said that even in the original limited form, officially designated a trial period, the system was important.

On 5 August 2011, the IDF redeployed the Iron Dome system near Ashkelon following days of heightened rocket fire from Gaza into Israel. The deployment came a day after Ashkelon mayor Benny Vaknin sent Prime Minister Benjamin Netanyahu and Defense Minister Ehud Barak a letter asking them to redeploy the system.

On 18 August 2011, four rockets were fired from Gaza at Ashkelon. The system determined that two were a threat and intercepted them, ignoring the other two which were directed at non-populated areas. No injuries or damage were reported. Defense officials said that Iron Dome would be re-deployed in Beersheba.

On 20 August 2011, while engaging with a volley of seven rockets fired almost simultaneously at Be'er Sheva from Gaza, one was not intercepted by the defense system, exploding in a residential area and killing one person. Brig. Gen. Doron Gavish, commander of the IAF's Air Defense Corps, said on the following day that "we said in advance that this wasn't a hermetic system," adding that the air defense units were learning on the fly and improving the performance of Iron Dome while operating it. "This is the first system of its kind anywhere in the world; it is in its first operational test; and we've already intercepted a large number of rockets targeting Israeli communities, saving many civilian lives," Gavish said.

On 21 August 2011, Ynetnews reported that the success of the Iron Dome system against Gazan rocket fire had southern city mayors battling over the right to be the next to have it deployed in their area. The IDF stressed that "no system can offer airtight protection" and that the system positioned in Ashkelon was incapable of extending its defense to Ashdod, but this did not stop the mayors from pressuring the Defense Ministry and the IDF to position Iron Dome batteries within their city limits. Ashdod, Ofakim, Netivot, Beersheba, and Ashkelon have all pursued the system, but the IDF had only two batteries available.

On the same day, The Jerusalem Post reported that Defense Minister Ehud Barak announced that a third Iron Dome battery would be installed in the region "within weeks", and estimated that nine more batteries would be positioned within the next two years. In attacks shortly before, the Iron Dome system had successfully intercepted about 85% of the rockets identified as threats to populated areas by the Battle Management Control (BMC) system launched at Israel from Gaza.

On 23 August 2011, Globes reported that Rafael would invest tens of millions of shekels in the following months to open a second production line for the Iron Dome's Tamir interceptor missiles. Future operational needs, as well as the plan to build two more Iron Dome batteries by the end of the year, necessitated the increase of missile production.

On 31 August 2011, the IAF deployed a third Iron Dome battery outside Ashdod. Defense Minister Ehud Barak, who had said earlier in the week that it would take 10 days until the battery was deployed near Ashdod, praised the IDF and the IAF Air Defense Division for beating the deadline and beginning the deployment before the opening of the school year.

On 1 December 2011, Brig. Gen. Gavish said that a fourth battery of the system would be deployed in the "coming months". He spoke to The Jerusalem Post ahead of the Air Defense Division's largest-ever draft of soldiers needed to fill the ranks of its increasing number of units and battalions. "The numbers will continue to grow and another battery will become operational in the beginning of the year," he said. On 8 December, "outstanding" officer Capt. Roytal Ozen began to command the battery's unit in preparation for its deployment, the first woman to be in charge of the system.

On 6 December 2011, Matan Vilnai, the Israeli Minister of Home Front Defense, said that the Defense Ministry was considering a permanent deployment of an Iron Dome battery in the Haifa Port to protect the oil refineries there against future Hezbollah rocket attacks. "The continued work of the oil refineries is critical for the Israeli economy during a time of war," he said. During the Second Lebanon War in 2006, a number of Katyusha rockets struck Haifa but did not hit the refineries. Officials were concerned that a direct hit on one of the refineries could cause numerous casualties as a result of leakage of dangerous chemical substances. The port was also the site of a chemical terminal that included containers of ammonia and ethylene gas.

On 30 December 2011, The Jerusalem Post reported that a performance analysis it had obtained shows that Iron Dome was successful in downing rockets from Gaza 75% of the times it fired. It said two interceptors are usually fired at each rocket. In April 2011, for example, the system succeeded in intercepting eight of 10 rockets. Following the October violence, the IDF conducted an inquiry into the Iron Dome's performance and discovered that a radar failure caused some of the interceptors to miss their targets, a problem since corrected. An officer told the Post that "seventy-five percent is impressive, but we would still like to see it perform better."

==== Response by Palestinian militants ====
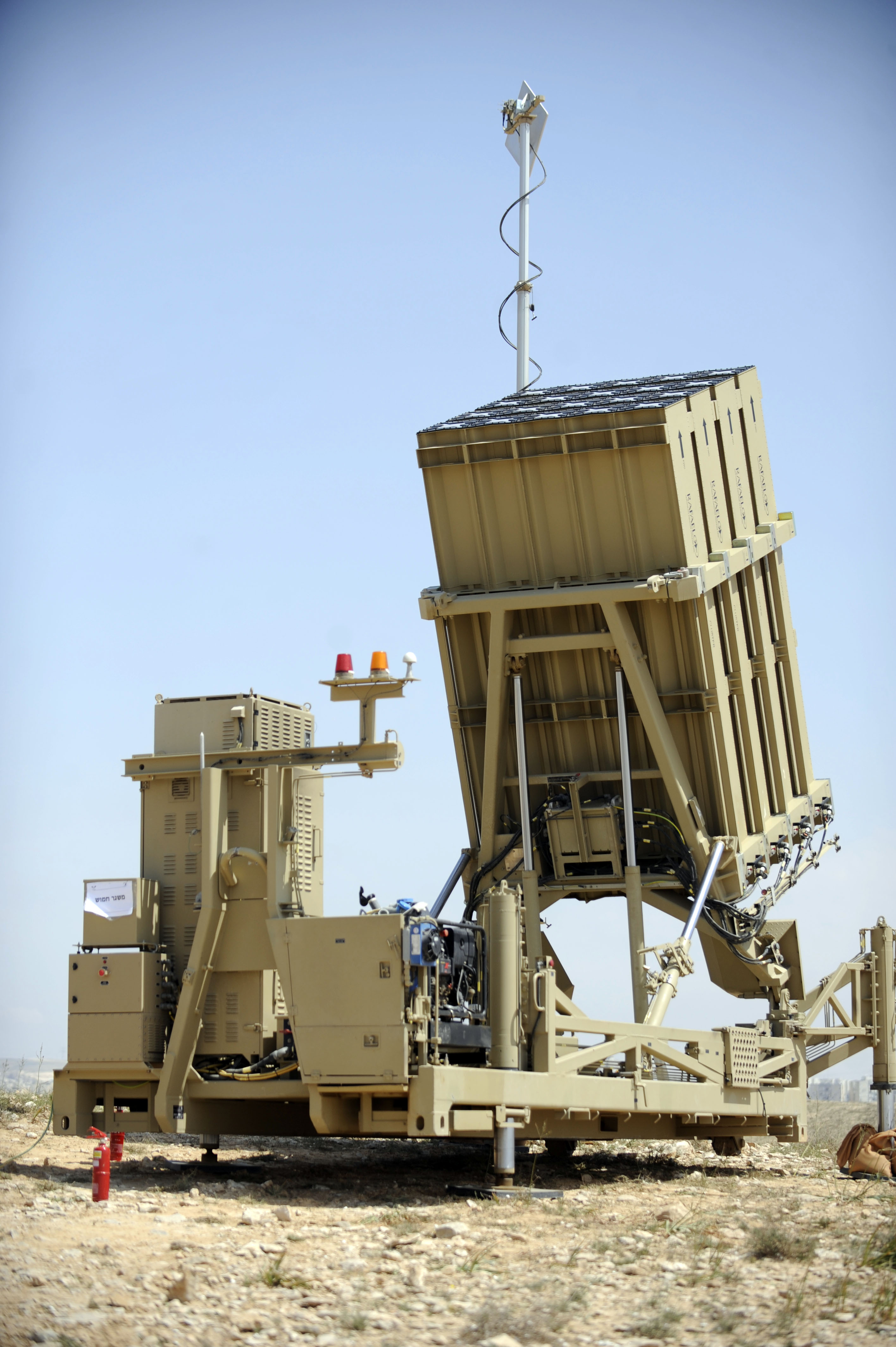
Iron Dome launcher deployed near Ashkelon

On 22 August 2011, Haaretz reported that according to Israeli security sources, Palestinian militants changed their rocket-launching tactics in an attempt to evade the two Iron Dome batteries deployed in southern Israel. The new tactics included aiming more frequently at areas beyond the Iron Dome protection range. After the Palestinian launch teams realized that the systems deployed in the previous two weeks around Ashkelon and Be'er Sheva provided near-perfect protection from rockets, they began firing more frequently at Ashdod and Ofakim. When they did target Beersheba on 21 August, they did not fire rockets individually as they had in the past, but rather a volley of seven rockets almost simultaneously. Iron Dome intercepted five of them successfully, but one penetrated the defense system, exploding in a residential area and killing a man.

==== August 2011 Supreme Court decision ====
On 8 August 2011, the Israeli High Court of Justice rejected a petition asking that the government be ordered to deploy the system in Gaza border communities. In rejecting the petition, Supreme Court President Dorit Beinisch and Justices Salim Joubran and Uzi Fogelman ruled that in balancing all relevant considerations including budgets, changing security realities and operational matters, the government's decision not to deploy the Iron Dome in the area was reasonable. The panel of justices also said that the court had no reason to intervene in operational decisions regarding where to deploy the Iron Dome system. "We believe the [government] will make the necessary decisions in accordance with the time and place requirements," they said.

In its petition, the Eshkol Regional Council argued that the government should be ordered to deploy the Iron Dome to protect communities between 4.5 and 7 kilometers from Gaza from rocket fire. Government-funded rocket-roof protection is in place for homes in communities within 4.5 km of Gaza, but not for structures further from the border.

The state said that the High Court should not intervene in the "military decision" regarding how and where to deploy the anti-rocket system. It also argued that if the court were to order it to deploy Iron Dome in a specific area, budgetary limitations would result in other communities not receiving protection, particularly as the range of Palestinian rockets had grown in recent years and therefore it was not possible to deploy Iron Dome to protect every community.

==== December 2011 accident ====
On 26 December 2011, an accident occurred during a maintenance drill involving one of the systems. While loading missiles into a launcher vehicle from a bunker at the Air Defense Network's school near kibbutz Mashabei Sadeh in the Negev, two soldiers caused twenty Tamir interceptors to fall from a height of four meters near soldiers and officers without detonating, causing no injury, but making them unserviceable. Ynetnews reported that the soldiers were never in danger because the interceptor missiles are equipped with a security mechanism that prevents premature explosions. The IDF Spokesperson's Unit said that the Air Force commander, Maj. Gen. Ido Nehushtan, appointed a committee to examine the accident and ordered an immediate stop to all Air Defense Network maintenance work until a preliminary investigation was concluded. It also said that during the following week actions would be taken to "improve skills and safety awareness". A security official told Reshet Bet that the failure was twofold in that the soldiers and their commander deviated from severely strict safety protocols, and 20 costly interceptors were lost. Walla! website reported that the soldiers made a mistake in loading the missiles and they fell backwards. The website calculated the damage at US$1 million (at $50,000 per missile). The missiles were transferred back to Rafael to determine whether they could be repaired.

On 1 January 2012, those soldiers were sentenced to punishment by the school's commanding officer following an inquiry into their conduct regarding the incident. The lieutenant in charge of the loading crew was given 21 days in mahbosh, while the sergeant in charge of the technician crew was given 14 days.

=== 2012 ===
==== March 2012 intensive attacks ====
After the IDF killing of Zohair al-Qaisi, the secretary general of the Popular Resistance Committees in Gaza on 9 March 2012, more than 300 rockets were fired on Israel. Some 177 fell on Israeli territory. The Iron Dome system had successfully intercepted at least 56 rockets (directed at population centers) in 71 attempts.

==== July 2012 first Eilat deployment ====
On 11 July 2012, Ynetnews reported that on that day the Iron Dome system was deployed in the greater Eilat area as a part of an IDF survey meant to test it in various areas across Israel. The IDF published on its website that the Iron Dome battery will be temporarily stationed there as part of an effort to test and prepare different sites across the country for the possibility of permanently stationing there additional batteries. "Since the system continues to grow and improve, it is important to test potential sites," said a commander from the Air Defense Formation. "After stationing Iron Dome batteries in numerous regions in southern Israel, including Ashkelon, Ashdod, Netivot and Gush Dan—it is time to test the southernmost region in the country, Eilat." Haaretz reported that an official, speaking on condition of anonymity, said the interceptors were set up on 9 July. Three weeks beforehand, two Katyhusha rockets were fired into southern Israel, and according to The Jerusalem Post the IDF believes that they originated from the Sinai. According to the report, IDF assessments are that they were either fired by a Palestinian rocket cell from Gaza—affiliated either with Hamas or Islamic Jihad—or by Bedouin freelancers who work for them. The launches followed an earlier one in April 2012, when at least one Katyusha rocket was fired from the Sinai to Eilat. Ynetnews reported that according to a military source, following these rocket attacks, the IDF decided not to take any chances and calibrated the system to the region's topography, before finally deploying it. The system's deployment was coordinated with local communities and the City of Eilat, to prevent public panic.

==== November 2012 Operation Pillar of Defense ====
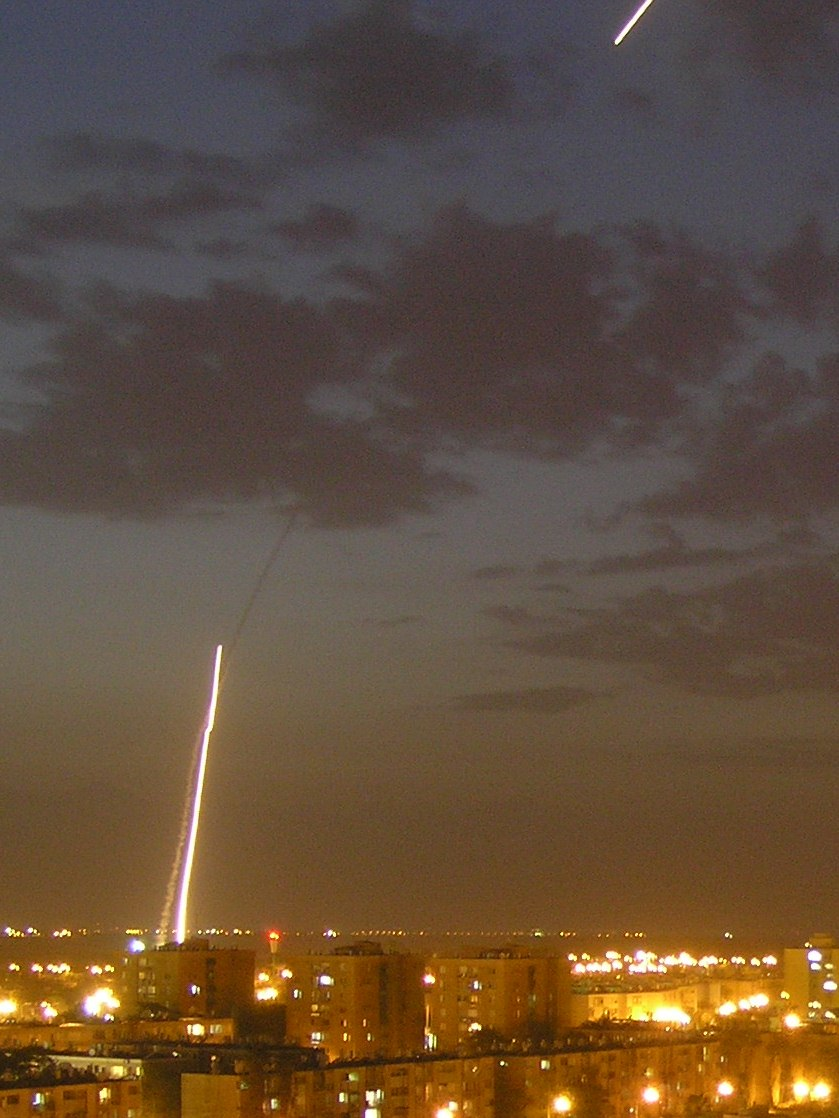
Iron Dome launches during Operation Pillar of Defense, November 2012

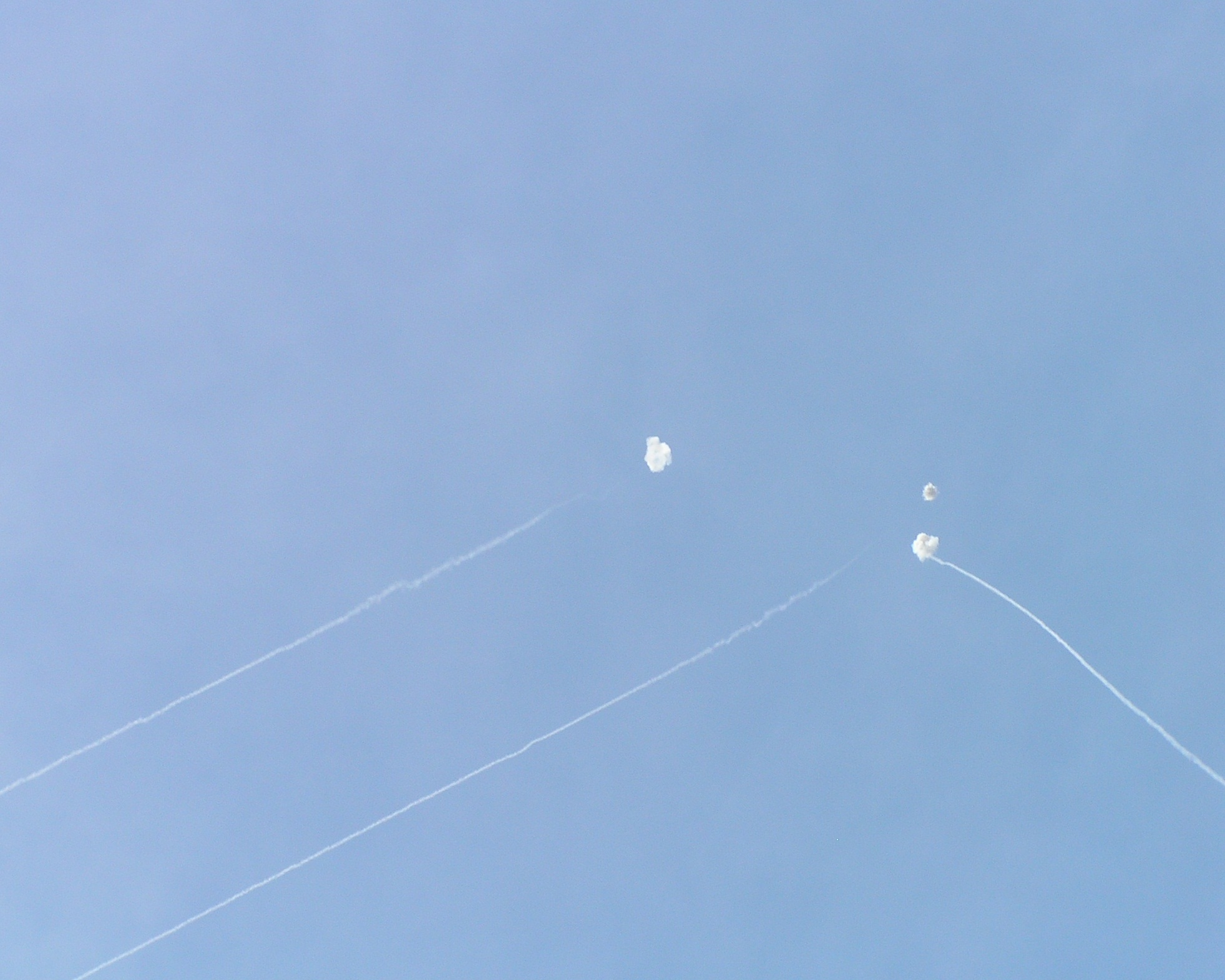
Iron Dome intercepting rockets during Operation Pillar of Defense, 2012

According to the Israeli Air Force, during operation "Pillar of Defense" (14–21 November 2012) Iron Dome made 421 interceptions. On 17 November, after two rockets targeted Tel Aviv during the operation, a battery was deployed in the area. Within hours, a third rocket was intercepted by the system. This fifth battery had not been scheduled to come into service until early 2013.

CNN relayed an estimate that Iron Dome's success rate in Pillar of Defense was about 85%.

=== 2014 ===
==== July 2014 Operation Protective Edge ====
The system was employed during operation "Protective Edge", intercepting rockets launched from Gaza towards southern, central and northern parts of Israel. As of August 2014, ten Iron Dome batteries had been deployed throughout Israel. During the 50 days of the conflict 4,594 rockets and mortars were fired at Israeli targets; Iron Dome systems intercepted 735 projectiles that it determined were threatening, achieving an intercept success rate of 90 percent. Only 70 rockets fired at Israel from Gaza failed to be intercepted. One civilian was killed and three others and nine servicemen were wounded by mortar bombs, but they were not in areas protected by Iron Dome. Only 25 percent of rockets fired were determined to be threatening due to the low accuracy and unstable trajectory of the poor-quality rockets fired. Six systems had been deployed prior to hostilities, and three more were rushed into service for a total of nine batteries used during the conflict; a tenth system was delivered, but not deployed due to a shortage of staff.

=== 2018 ===
==== May 2018 Israel–Iran incidents ====
On 10 May 2018, the Islamic Revolutionary Guard Corps of Iran allegedly launched 20 rockets from Syria toward Israel in retaliation for recent Israeli airstrikes against IRGC facilities. According to an IDF spokesperson, 16 of the rockets fell short of the Israeli border, and Iron Dome intercepted the other four. Israel reported no casualties or damage.

==== Gaza-Israel clashes ====
The Iron Dome system intercepted 100 rockets that were launched from the Gaza Strip in mid-November 2018.

=== 2019 ===
==== Mount Hermon video ====
On 21 January 2019, the IDF released footage online of a Syrian Arab Army rocket attack on the Golan Heights being intercepted by Iron Dome. The video was shot by skiers at Mount Hermon ski resort; Israeli authorities announced that the resort was closed until further notice. The attack was in response to Israel's launching of nine rockets at SAA targets in western Damascus.

=== 2021 ===
==== 2021 Israel–Palestine crisis ====
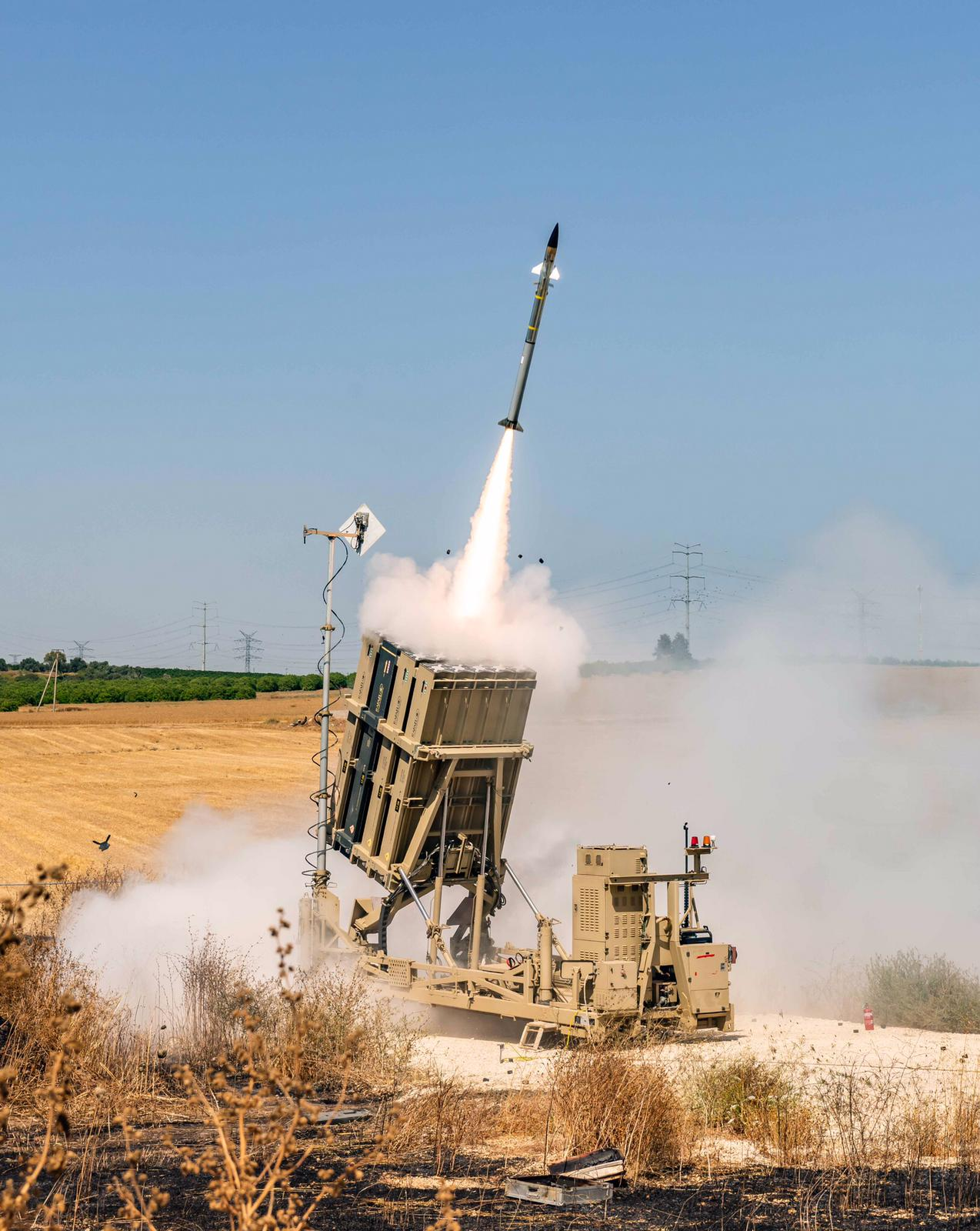
Iron Dome launching a Tamir interceptor during Operation Guardian of the Walls, May 2021

During the 2021 Israel–Palestine crisis, over 4,300 rockets were fired at Israel by Hamas from Gaza from 11 to 21 May. In the first 24 hours of the conflict 470 rockets were fired, a much higher rate than had been attained in previous conflicts. Of the rockets, 17% were long-range attacks on Tel Aviv, again more than previously. About 680 of the rockets fired during hostilities fell short and landed in Gaza; the Iron Dome system intercepted about 90% of the rockets heading to populated areas within Israel. During the operation Iron Dome shot down a bomb-laden drone.

On 15 May 2021, Israel destroyed the 12-story al-Jalaa tower building, which housed the Gaza offices of Associated Press (AP) and Al Jazeera, with an air strike, giving one hour's notice for evacuation. Israel said that Hamas was carrying out signals intelligence (SIGINT), electronic signals intelligence (ELINT), and electronic warfare (EW) operations, including the development of an electronic system to jam the Iron Dome, from within the building.

=== 2024 ===
During the April 2024 Iranian strikes against Israel, the Iron Dome was deployed and intercepted attacks from Iran.

By October 2024, anti-air missiles in Israel used to supply the Iron Dome were running low, resulting in American forces being deployed into Israel with a THAAD missile system.

=== Iron Dome in the 2025 Twelve-Day War ===
In June 2025, amidst the airstrikes between Iran and Israel, Iranian ballistic missiles successfully evaded Israeli missile defense systems and struck significant targets. An Israeli military representative highlighted that no defense system achieves a flawless success rate, suggesting that certain Iranian missiles managed to penetrate the defenses. Dr. Marion Messmer, a senior fellow in security studies at Chatham House, stated that the public perception of Iron Dome exceeds its actual effectiveness; however, she noted that "no air defense system is entirely invulnerable."

=== 2026 ===
Amid the 2026 Iran war, Israel sent an Iron Dome battery along with IDF troops to the United Arab Emirates at the request of President Mohamed bin Zayed Al Nahyan. This marked the first time the system was sent out of Israel and the first deployment outside Israel or the U.S. US Ambassador to Israel Mike Huckabee later officially confirmed it.

== Deployment at sea ==
In 2017 it was reported that Israel was planning to deploy Iron Dome batteries at sea to protect off-shore gas platforms, working in conjunction with Israel's Barak 8 missile system. Two Iron Dome batteries were to be deployed on each of the Israeli Navy's Sa'ar 6-class corvettes, which are in charge of guarding the natural gas platforms off Israel's coast and its shipping lanes. During a military exercise in February 2022, an advanced model of the Iron Dome installed on the Sa'ar-6 corvettes was able to shoot down rockets, drones and cruise missiles at sea.

On 8 April 2024, the C-Dome battery of the Sa'ar 6-class corvette INS Magen scored the first operational interception of the system when it shot down a UAV drone near Eilat.

== Foreign sales ==
Some Iron Dome systems have been exported. A weakness for most potential markets is that each Iron Dome system protects no more than 100–150 square kilometres (39–58 square miles); this is effective in a small country like Israel, but not for larger states. Even in Israel, the batteries have to be moved around according to perceived risk of attack. Singapore, a sovereign island city-state, is reported to have purchased the Iron Dome, and the US Army has bought two batteries to protect overseas bases.

On 17 December 2016, Azerbaijan Defense Industry Minister Yavar Jamalov told reporters that Azerbaijan had reached an agreement with Israel to purchase Iron Dome batteries in the first confirmed foreign sale of the system. The country's acquisition of the system is believed to be related to neighboring Armenia's purchase of Russian Iskander short-range ballistic missiles.

On 23 November 2012, The Economic Times reported that Indian Defense planners were considering the possibility of India acquiring an indigenous version of Iron Dome, keeping a close watch on the performance of Iron Dome during the 2012 Operation Pillar of Defense. Several months earlier, the military scientists in the Defense Research and Development Organisation (DRDO) had suggested that India look at a joint development program with Israeli firms to develop an Indian version of Iron Dome. They believed Israel's short range missile defense requirements have several parallels to the Indian threat from Pakistan, which includes a "battlefield range" quasi-tactical ballistic nuclear weapon delivery system, called Nasr, which some Indian defense sources say the Iron Dome might be an effective deterrent against, as well as the vulnerability of its cities to attacks from militants.

The Israeli team comes and works in our laboratories. Our team goes and works in their laboratories and industries. There is a learning that is taking place which was not there when we buy things and integrate with existing products... we have started discussions about Iron Dome for co-development (in India)

— W. Selvamurthy, Chief Controller looking after international cooperation

On 8 February 2013, Marshal Norman Anil Kumar Browne, commander of the Indian Air Force, told reporters that Iron Dome is not suitable for the service. The announcement came after two years of discussions. In August 2013, India resumed attempting to acquire the Iron Dome system after Israel agreed to transfer system technology. Iron Dome could complement the domestic long-range Indian Ballistic Missile Defence Programme air defense system.
In 2017, Israeli Prime Minister Benjamin Netanyahu and his Indian counterpart Narendra Modi signed a series of agreements on defense and technology worth around $2 billion, including a deal to buy the "Iron Dome" system.

In May 2018, it was reported that Romania's Romaero signed a deal to for the production of the Iron Dome system. In 2025, Rafael was declared winner of Romania's SHORAD/VSHORAD program tender. The Iron Dome was part of the company's offer along with the SPYDER system.

On 16 August 2011, Raytheon Company announced that it had teamed with Rafael to lead marketing in the United States for the Iron Dome system. "Iron Dome complements other Raytheon weapons that provide intercept capabilities to the US Army's Counter Rocket, Artillery, and Mortar initiative at forward operating bases," said Mike Booen, vice president of Raytheon Missile Systems' Advanced Security and Directed Energy Systems product line. "Iron Dome can be seamlessly integrated with Raytheon's C-RAM systems to complete the layered defense."
On 10 November 2011, The Jerusalem Post reported that the US Army had expressed interest in acquiring the system, to be deployed outside forward bases in Iraq and Afghanistan that could potentially be targeted by artillery rockets. The US military had discovered 107 mm rockets in Iraq in the past. Yossi Druker, head of Rafael's Air-to-Air Directorate, said that the initial deal was valued at $100 million, but could reach several hundred million dollars over a number of years. In April 2016, Iron Dome's Tamir interceptor successfully shot down a UAV during a test firing in the United States, the system's first trial on foreign soil.
In January 2019 it was reported that the United States would purchase two Iron Dome batteries for 373 million dollars. The batteries were to be deployed to protect US armed forces in hostile areas of operation. The order was for two command posts and radars, 12 launchers, and 480 missiles and was finalized in August 2019. Rafael announced the first battery's delivery on 30 September 2020. On 13 November 2020, Iron Dome was activated at Fort Bliss to test if it could be connected into the Army's air and missile defense network, to serve as an interim capability to intercept cruise missiles.
In 2020, the service decided against purchasing any more Iron Dome systems, ostensibly over issues integrating it with the new Integrated Battle Command System (IBCS) network architecture. The Israeli MOD announced the delivery of the second battery on 3 January 2021.
The Army conducted a live-fire test in August 2021, successfully engaging eight cruise missile surrogates.
On 8 October 2021, it was reported by The War Zone magazine that the 94th Army Air and Missile Defense Command announced that week that it was following the 2019 National Defense Authorization Act, which required the deployment of an Iron Dome system to an operational theater by the end of 2021, by the temporary and experimental deployment of a system to Andersen Air Force Base in Guam. The battery was to be operated by the 2nd Battalion of the 43rd Air Defense Artillery Regiment. It also stated that there was no plan to conduct a live fire test there. The War Zone added that the Army's 38th Air Defense Artillery Brigade, then forward-based in Japan, was also to support this deployment. On 9 November 2021, the Wall Street Journal reported that the system was being tested in Guam, and speculated that it would likely be part of an array designed to protect the area against possible attacks by China. On 16 May 2023 US Lt. Gen. Daniel Karbler testified to the US Congress that the US has two Iron Dome batteries, and that one is ready for deployment, and that one battery is wrapping up its training.
In 2025, President Donald Trump called for what was initially termed an "Iron Dome for America", later renamed "Golden Dome". The called-for system would be inspired by the Iron Dome system and given the country's large size, could take many years to implement.

=== Possible foreign sales ===
In August 2022, it was reported that Cyprus had signed an agreement with Israel to purchase the Iron Dome for the Cypriot National Guard to counter the threat of Turkish drones.

On 10 March 2010, The Jerusalem Post reported that the Israeli Ministry of Defense was in talks with a number of European countries about the possible sale of the system to protect NATO forces deployed in Afghanistan and Iraq.

Singapore is believed to have at least one battery, but the government has never commented on its existence. Singapore was reported to be the main, albeit secret, funder of the research and development behind the Iron Dome project. Two Iron Dome radars EL/M-2084 were used in a Singapore military exercise in Thailand in 2016, but was first publicly displayed two years later in the Singapore Airshow 2018, without the launcher nor the battle command unit.

During a visit to Israel in the summer of 2011, Kwon Oh-bong, vice commissioner of the Defense Acquisition Program Administration in Seoul, expressed interest in purchasing the system to counter the threat posed by North Korean artillery, rockets, and missiles. By 2014, South Korea was considered unlikely to buy the Iron Dome system due to the number of artillery pieces it would face, the coverage it would need to provide around Seoul, and the high cost of interceptors; instead, effort was to be focused on disrupting the "Kill Chain" to immediately detect and destroy artillery and missile units. However, in August 2014, South Korea publicly stated it was still interested in buying the Iron Dome system for protection against rocket attacks. In October 2017, South Korea announced it would develop its own Iron Dome-type C-RAM system using hit-to-kill interceptors. Although they had considered buying Iron Dome, they determined the system had been developed primarily to counter mortar shells, and so was unsuited against the more powerful artillery rockets they would have to defend against.
Saudi Arabia
On 14 September 2021, it was revealed by Breaking Defense that Saudi Arabia is considering adding the Iron Dome missile defense system to its inventory after the US withdrew the THAAD and the MIM-104 Patriot out of Prince Sultan Air Base.

== Effectiveness ==
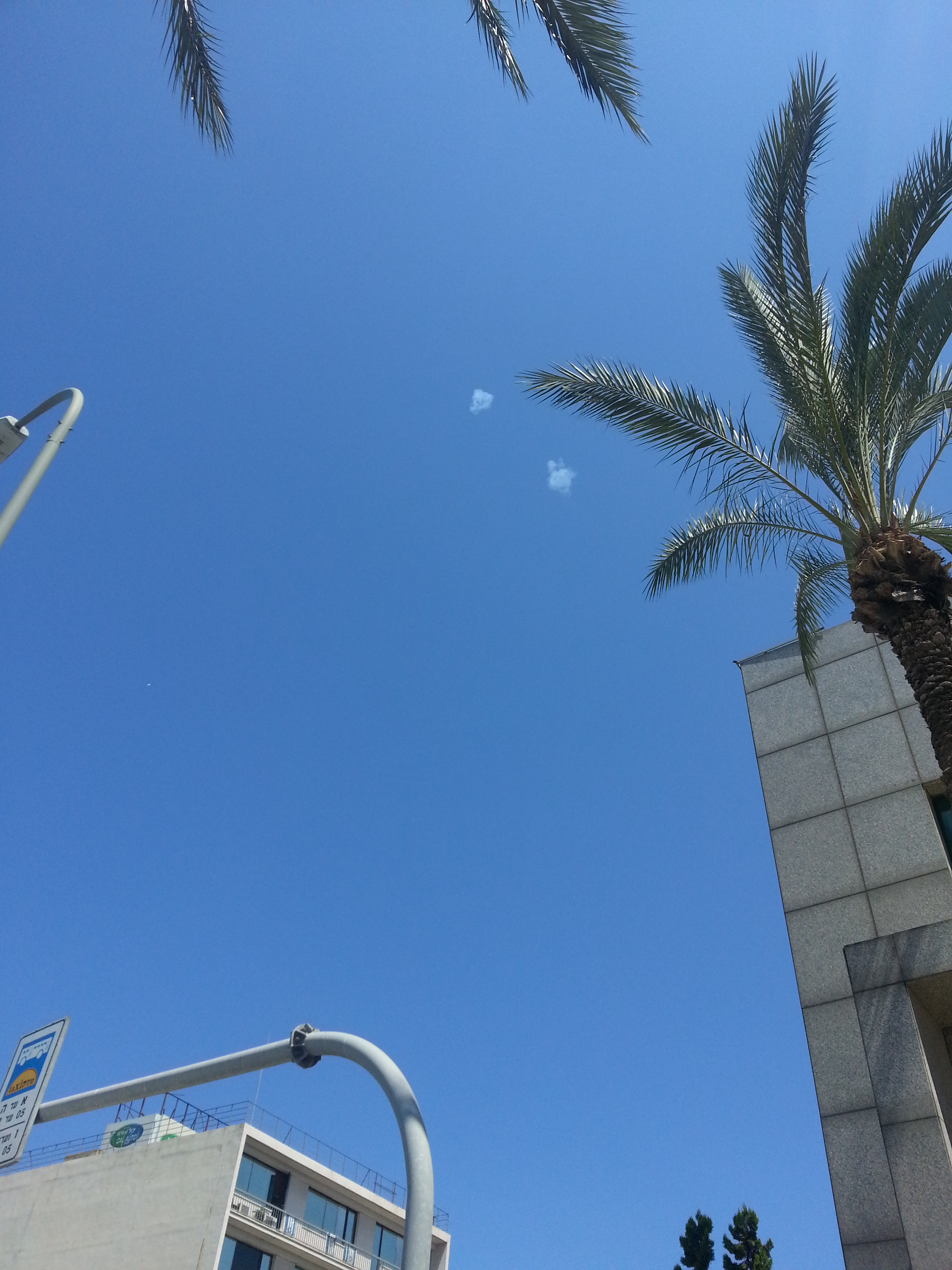
Iron Dome intercepting two rockets over Tel Aviv during Operation Protective Edge, 2014

Following the system's deployment in April 2011, Iron Dome was used to successfully intercept Katyusha rockets fired by Palestinian militants. In August that year, Iron Dome intercepted 20 missiles and rockets fired into Israel. However, in one instance the system destroyed four rockets fired at the city of Beersheba but failed to stop a fifth, which killed one man and injured several others.

In November 2012, during Operation Pillar of Defense, the Iron Dome's effectiveness was estimated by Israeli officials at between 75 and 95 percent. According to Israeli officials, of the approximately 1,000 missiles and rockets fired into Israel by Hamas from the beginning of Operation Pillar of Defense up to 17 November 2012, Iron Dome identified two-thirds as not posing a threat and intercepted 90 percent of the remaining 300. During this period the only Israeli casualties were three individuals killed in missile attacks after a malfunction of the Iron Dome system.

In comparison with other air defense systems, the effectiveness rate of Iron Dome is very high. Defense consultant Steven Zaloga stated that Iron Dome's destruction of 90 percent of missiles it targeted is "an extremely high level", above that usually expected for air defense systems. Slate reported that the effectiveness rate is "unprecedented" in comparison with earlier systems such as the Patriot missile defence system.

Defense reporter Mark Thompson wrote that, the "lack of Israeli casualties suggests Iron Dome is the most-effective, most-tested missile shield the world has ever seen."

During Operation Protective Edge, Iron Dome's interceptors were claimed to have struck down 87–90% of their targets, totaling 735 successful interceptions.

In the 2006 war with Hezbollah, prior to Iron Dome's development, during 34 days of fighting, 4,000 rockets landed and 53 Israelis were killed. However, in the 2014 war with Gaza, the 50-day conflict and 3,360 rockets resulted in just two rocket-related deaths. In 2006, about 30,000 insurance claims for rocket-related damage were filed, while in 2014, there were just 2,400.

On 25 March 2019 a J-80 rocket fired from Gaza hit a house in Mishmeret, Israel. According to Hamas the J-80 travels on a nonlinear path and cannot be intercepted by Iron Dome.

=== Cost ===
In 2010, before the system was declared operational, Iron Dome was criticized by Reuven Pedatzur, a military analyst, former fighter pilot and professor of political science at Tel Aviv University for costing too much compared to the cost of a Qassam rocket (fired by Palestinian forces), so that launching very large numbers of Qassams could essentially attack Israel's financial means. Rafael responded that the cost issue was exaggerated since Iron Dome intercepts only rockets determined to constitute a threat, and that the lives saved and the strategic impact are worth the cost.

The estimated cost of each Tamir interceptor missile was cited in 2014 as from US$20,000 to 50,000; a 2020 analysis estimated a total cost of $100,000 to $150,000 for each interception. In contrast, a crudely manufactured Qassam rocket costs around $800 and the Hamas Grad rocket costs only several thousand dollars.

Other anti-rocket systems, such as the Nautilus laser defense system, were argued to be more effective. From 1995 to 2005, the United States and Israel jointly developed Nautilus but scrapped the system after concluding it was not feasible, having spent $600 million. The US Navy continued research and development on the system.

American defense company Northrop Grumman proposed developing a more advanced prototype of Nautilus, Skyguard. Skyguard would use laser beams to intercept rockets, with each beam discharge costing an estimated $1,000–$2,000. With an investment of $180 million, Northrop Grumman claimed it could possibly deploy the system within 18 months. Israeli defense officials rejected the proposal, citing the extended timeline and additional costs.

In a 2012 op-ed in Haaretz, Jamie Levin suggested that the success of the Iron Dome system was likely to increase demands to field additional systems across Israel. Budget shortfalls meant that Israel would be forced to weigh spending on missile defenses against other expenditures. Such funds, he argued, would probably come from programs intended to help the most vulnerable sectors of society, such as social welfare.

=== Vulnerabilities ===
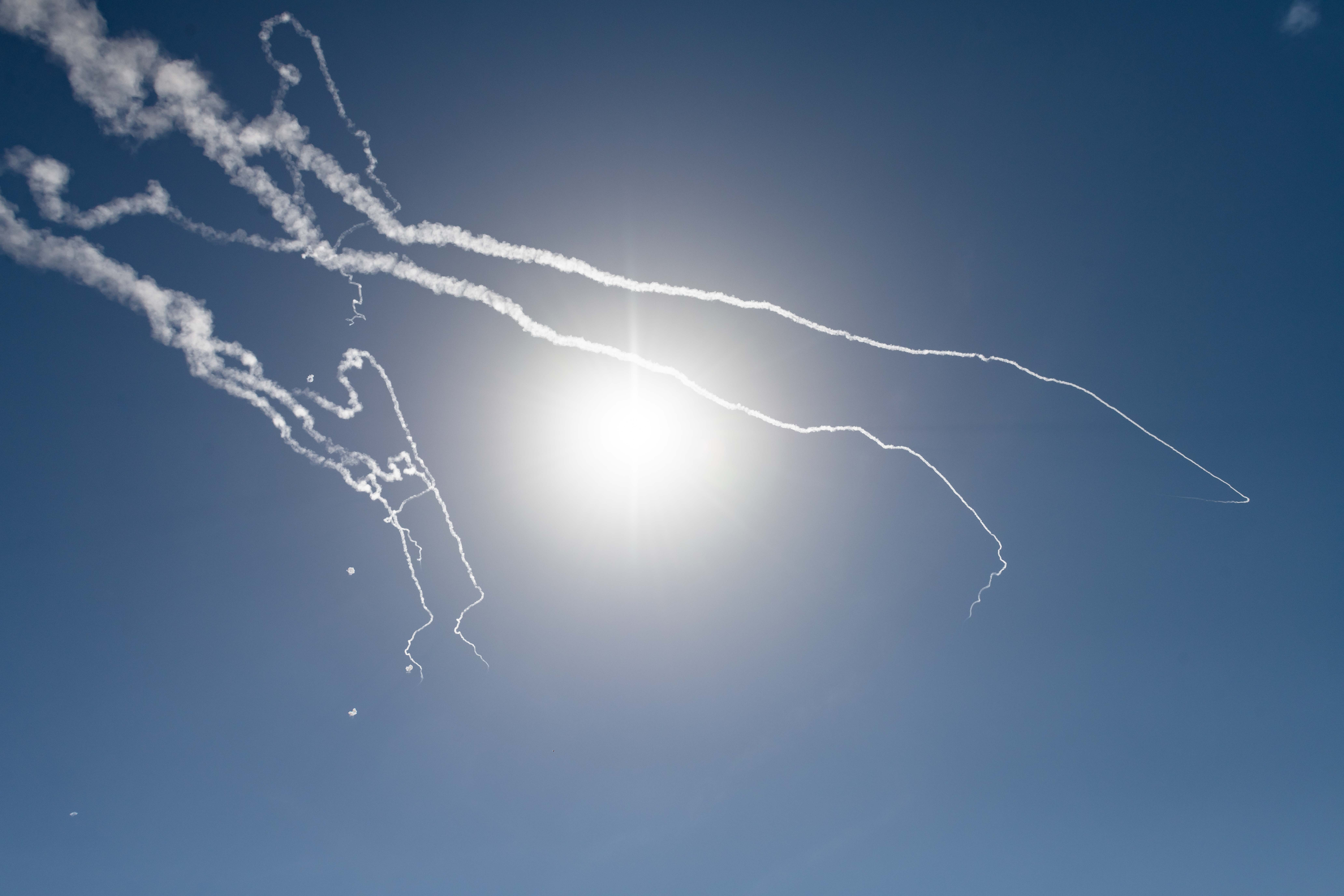
Iron Dome launch during Operation Guardian of the Walls, May 2021

Iron Dome can potentially be overcome by swarms of many missiles that exceed its capability to intercept them, and by sheer numbers of attacking missiles during a campaign if not enough interceptors are available to counter them. Also, the cost of each interception is high, while attacking rockets can be relatively inexpensive. These are among the reasons encouraging the development of the Iron Beam energy weapon to complement Iron Dome, which is cheap to fire, has unlimited "ammunition", and is effective at short range. Iron Dome is also significantly less effective against very short-distance saturation strikes. Hamas is aware of these vulnerabilities. In addition to having very large numbers of rockets and using saturation strikes, they consistently fire rockets at low trajectories to make them harder to intercept.

According to Ronen Bergman, in 2012, during Operation Pillar of Defense, Israel agreed to an early cease-fire "for a reason that has remained a closely guarded secret: The Iron Dome anti-missile defense system... had run out of ammunition." Bergman says that as a result of the experience, Israel had tried to prepare larger stocks of interceptors for future rounds of fighting.

During the 2021 Israel–Palestine crisis, Israel said that Hamas had been developing an electronic system to jam the Iron Dome; Israeli aircraft destroyed a building said to have been used for this purpose. The Ukrainian Defence Minister Oleksii Reznikov has explained the flaws in Iron Dome, if deployed to Ukraine: "We all know the example of Israel, which protects the sky quite well. We all know the name Iron Dome, but even it does not give 100% protection. In fact, I've been to Israel and talked to their manufacturers and state enterprises. Iron Dome was built [for protection] against slow, low-altitude, low-impact missiles that were basically made in garages. Iron Dome does not protect against cruise and ballistic missiles."

During a hearing before the US Senate's Senate Armed Services Subcommittee on Strategic Forces, Assistant Secretary of Defense for Space Policy John F. Plumb was asked why an Iron Dome system had not been deployed to Ukraine, given that the US had contributed some $2.6 billion to its development. Secretary Plumb explained that Ukraine had been supplied with "things we can supply from our own stock", such as the Patriot missile system. US Army Space and Missile Defense commander, Lt.-Gen. Daniel Karbler, further explained that the US only has two systems, one of which is being used for testing. According to Secretary Plumb the second can be deployed to Ukraine: "the army does have one [Iron Dome battery] available for deployment if we get a request from it".

Ukrainian Defence Minister Oleksii Reznikov noted that the system does not protect "against cruise and ballistic missiles." Further there were an estimated 10 batteries protecting Israel, which is still not enough to protect the country. Amir Peretz, the Israeli Defense Minister who pushed through the implementation of Iron Dome, told The Washington Post that the system was no more than a stopgap measure, and that "In the end, the only thing that will bring true quiet is a diplomatic solution."

During Iran's 2025 strikes (Operation True Promise III), Iron Dome was found to have intercepted 20-30% of ballistic missiles.

During the 2026 Iranian strikes on Israel about half of the missiles launched from Iran were equipped with warheads carrying multiple cluster bombs. This tactic exposed a vulnerability in the Israeli defenses, forcing the defenders to either ignore the dispersing cluster bombs or waste large amounts of expensive missiles to intercept each one individually.

=== Analysis ===
==== Prior to deployment ====
Prior to its deployment, the Iron Dome was criticized as ineffective in countering the Qassam threat for the southern city of Sderot, given the short distance—840m, half a mile, from the closest point in Sderot to Gaza—and flight time between the much-attacked city and the rocket launching pads in the Gaza Strip. Israeli defense officials insisted in 2008 that with recent improvements to Iron Dome, the system was fully able to intercept Qassams.

==== Analysis based on YouTube video footage ====
An unpublished 2013 report by Theodore Postol, Mordechai Shefer and Richard Lloyd, argued that the official effectiveness figures for Iron Dome during Operation Pillar of Defense were incorrect. Although Postol had earlier lauded Iron Dome's effectiveness, after studying YouTube videos of the warhead interceptions as well as police reports and other data, he argued that "Iron Dome's intercept rate, defined as destruction of the rocket's warhead, was relatively low, perhaps as low as 5%, but could well be lower." Postol reached this conclusion mainly from an analysis of non-official footage of interceptions taken by civilians and published on YouTube.

The Israeli Institute of National Security Studies published a detailed rebuttal to Postol's claims, labeling it "dubious research without access to credible data". The rebuttal stated:

The report's claims appear puzzling, to say the least, particularly the contention that Iron Dome did not succeed in causing the rocket's warhead to explode... These clips were not filmed during sophisticated trials; they were taken by civilians who photographed them using their smartphones and uploaded them to YouTube. In general, it is not possible to know where they were filmed or the direction in which the person filming was looking. It is very difficult to conduct precise analyses, and it is generally difficult to learn from the film about the geometry of the missile's flight. The researchers also looked for double explosions and failed to find them. This is not surprising, since such explosions are very close to each other both in distance and in time—less than a thousandth of a second. There is no way that a smartphone camera could distinguish between a double and a single explosion.

Uzi Rubin writes:

So how did Postol reach such a radical conclusion? He made a series of assumptions on Iron Dome performance, most of them very wrong, and examined public domain video clips shot from smartphones and media cameras that showed the wind-sheared smoke trails of Iron Dome interceptors, but in which the engaged rockets remained invisible. From this half-blind sky picture, he guessed interception geometries that, when matched with his own gross underestimation of Iron Dome performance, yielded an intuitive estimate of a 5 percent to 10 percent success rate... Postol's estimates are simply wrong.

==== Analysis of damage reports ====
Postol additionally used the amount of claims filed by the Property Tax Authority and the number of Israeli Police Reports (taken from the Israeli Police website) relating to rockets to support his argument. In relation to Postol's argument based on the number of reports the Israeli Police received, Israeli Institute of National Security Studies wrote: "However, Israel Police reports on calls from citizens, and these include reports on falling fragments, rocket parts, and duds."

==== Analysis of losses per rocket ====
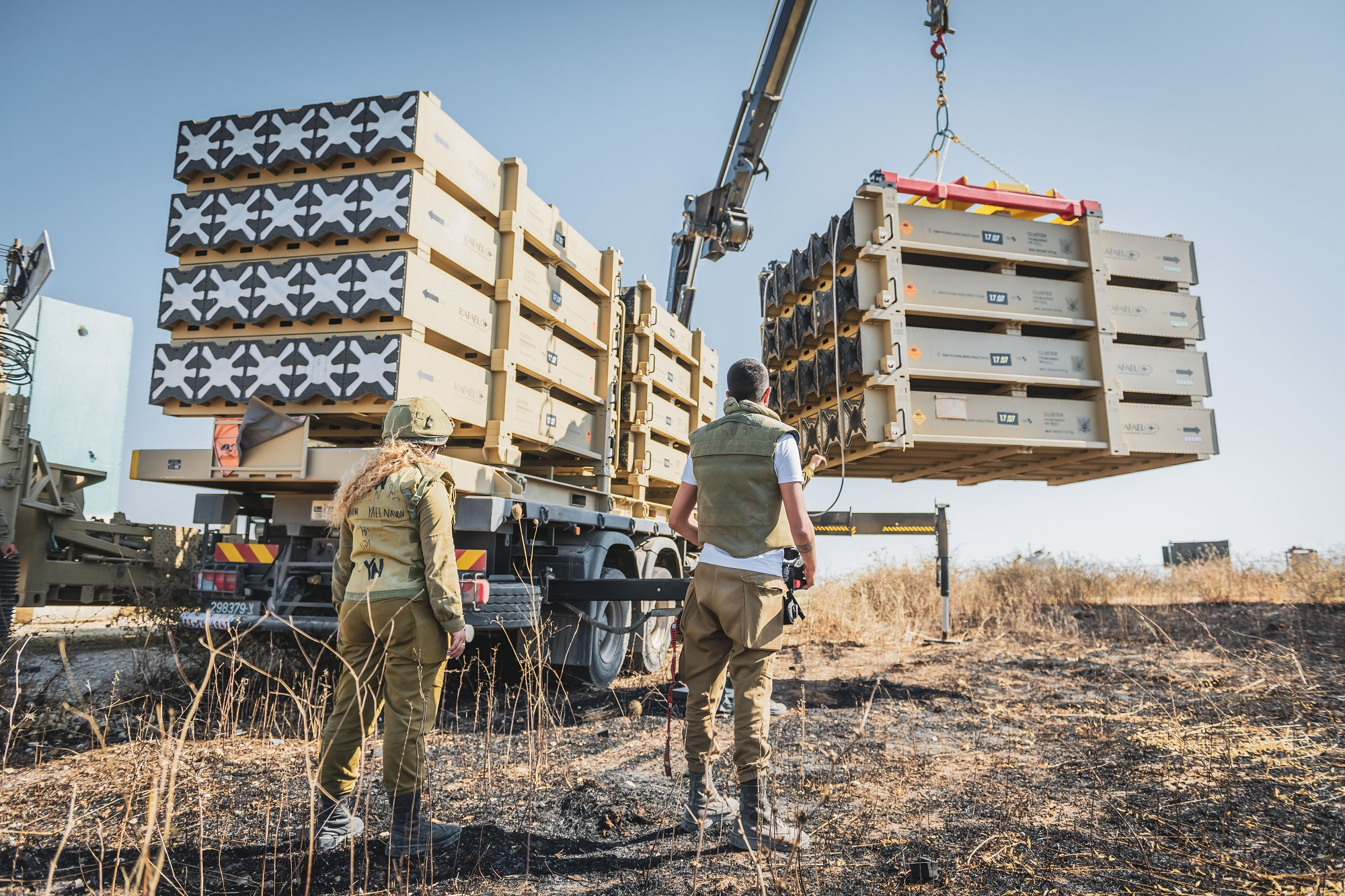
IDF Air Defense personnel operate the Iron Dome, May 2021

Research published in 2018 analyzed the numbers of deaths, injuries, and property damage claims per rocket fired for four conflicts. These were the Second Lebanon War of 2006, Operation Cast Lead in 2008–2009, Operation Pillar of Defense in 2012, and Operation Protective Edge in 2014. By comparing the loss rates per rocket of the latter two operations (which had Iron Dome batteries) to the first two (which did not), it estimated the interceptor batteries' overall effectiveness at reducing Israeli losses from rockets.

Those estimates suggest Iron Dome intercepted 59 to 75 percent of all threatening rockets during Protective Edge. "Threatening" means the rockets struck populated areas or were intercepted beforehand. The interceptions likely prevented $42 to $86 million in property damage, three to six deaths, and 120 to 250 injuries. Since those percentages include rockets anywhere in Israel, the high interception rates claimed for only the areas that batteries were defending seem plausible.

By contrast, Iron Dome apparently intercepted less than 32 percent of threatening rockets during Pillar of Defense, perhaps much less, preventing at most two deaths, 110 injuries and US$7 million in damage. The research also implies the number of rocket hits on populated areas was understated. Conversely, the number of threatening rockets seems overstated. The effective interception rate for Pillar of Defense therefore may have been markedly less than reported.

The study further estimated that improvements in Israeli civil defenses, such as warning sirens and hardened shelters, were at least as good as Iron Dome at reducing civilian deaths and injuries from rockets.

These results partly support critics (like Theodore Postol) of Iron Dome's effectiveness during Pillar of Defense. However, they also partly support proponents (like Uzi Rubin) of the system's effectiveness during Protective Edge.

==== Effects on Israeli society ====
Yoav Fromer of Tel Aviv University argued that the success of Iron Dome provided "both a physical and a psychological solace that enables Israelis to go about their business," which in the long term would reduce the urgency of establishing a broader regional political and diplomatic solution.

== See also ==
- Iron Spade - (Israel)
- Multi-Mission Launcher - (United States)
- Missile farm
