= Iron Spade =

Israeli tunnel defense system

Iron Spade and Iron Wall are the codenames given to Israel's effort to prevent offensive tunnels being built from the Gaza Strip into Israel. It is reported to be based in part on the Iron Dome project. The primary developer of the project is Elbit Systems, with Rafael, developers of Iron Dome also involved in the project.
