= Dov Raviv =

Israeli engineer

Dov Raviv (Hebrew: דב רביב; born in Romania in 1937) is an Israeli engineer, who was the director of the MLM plant of the Israel Aerospace Industries (between the years 1978–1991). Raviv is a Technion graduate in aeronautical engineering. Raviv is considered the father of Israel's interceptor missile programs (the "Arrow") and launchers.
