= April 2024 Israeli strikes on Iran =

Israeli limited strike against Iran

2024 Israeli strikes on Iran
- Part of the 2024 Iran–Israel conflict and the Middle Eastern crisis (2023–present)
- Type: Airstrike
- Location: Isfahan, Iran; Daraa and As-Suwayda Governorates, Syria; Babil and Baghdad Governorates, Iraq
- Planned by: Israel
- Objective: Retaliation for Iranian strikes on Israel
- Date: 19 April 2024; 05:23 IRST (UTC+03:30)
- Executed by: Israeli Air Force
- Outcome: Per US: Iranian air defense radar site protecting the Natanz nuclear facility destroyed; Per satellite imagery: Iranian S-300PMU2 surface-to-air missile battery 30N6E radar damaged or destroyed; There was no extensive damage on an Iranian airbase believed to be the main target.; Per Iran: No damage or casualties, Iranian air defense downed three Israeli UAVs and/or missiles over Isfahan.; In Syria: 1+ radar installation(s) destroyed (per Israel)

On 19 April 2024 at 5:23 a.m. IRST, the Israeli Air Force launched airstrikes targeting an air defense facility within Iran. The limited airstrikes targeted an air defense radar site at an airbase near Isfahan, in central Iran. Israeli missiles appear to have hit their target directly. Satellite images suggest that a surface-to-air missile battery was damaged or destroyed. There was no extensive damage to the base itself. The attack was launched in response to the Iranian drone and missile strikes in Israel, which itself was an Iranian retaliation for the Israeli airstrike on the Iranian consulate in Damascus.

Iranian media and social media reported minor explosions near Isfahan, where Iran has nuclear facilities, a drone manufacturing facility, and a major airbase. Iranian state media said that Israeli drones flying over the region were shot down by the Iranian Air Defense Force. Three Iranian officials confirmed to The New York Times that Israel was involved. US officials confirmed that at least three missiles from Israeli aircraft had struck Iran. No strikes were reported on Iran's nuclear sites.

According to a senior US official speaking to ABC News, Israeli aircraft, operating beyond Iran's borders, launched three missiles targeting an air defense radar site guarding the Natanz Nuclear Facility. The official further stated that the assessment indicated the successful destruction of the targeted site. He also said that the objective of the strike was to communicate Israel's capabilities to Iran without escalating tensions further. An Iranian official told Reuters that the explosions were from Israeli drones being shot down, and claimed that there had been no missile attack on Iran.

== Background ==
=== Middle East escalation ===
On 7 October 2023, Hamas, an Islamic militant group supported by Iran, carried out an attack in southern Israel, resulting in the deaths of 1,200 individuals and the kidnapping of at least 253 other Israeli and international citizens. Israel responded by launching the ongoing Israeli invasion of the Gaza Strip.

After 7 October, the Iranian-backed proxy Hezbollah in Lebanon began attacking northern Israel. There have been over 4,400 violent incidents recorded between Hezbollah and Israel since the start of the war, and about 100,000 Israelis have been evacuated from northern Israel since the beginning of the conflict. The Iranian-backed Houthi movement has launched dozens of drones and ballistic missiles towards Israel, and have hijacked and attacked ships in the Red Sea, severely restricting the flow of trade through the Suez Canal.

=== Bombing of the Iranian consulate in Damascus ===
On 1 April 2024, the Iranian consulate annex building adjacent to the Iranian embassy in Damascus, Syria, was struck by an Israeli airstrike, killing 16 people, including a woman and her son, and Brigadier General Mohammad Reza Zahedi, a senior Quds Force commander of the Islamic Revolutionary Guard Corps (IRGC), and seven other IRGC officers, in addition to six other militants belonging to Hezbollah and other Iranian supported groups. Soon after the attack, Iran vowed to retaliate, with reports suggesting this as a potential motive for the airstrike. The Jerusalem Post reported the building was inside the Iranian diplomatic compound, adjacent to the main embassy building.

In the weeks following the attack on the consulate, the United States, France, Germany and the United Kingdom all warned Iran not to retaliate to Israel and escalate the situation.

=== Iranian strikes in Israel ===
On 13 April 2024, the Islamic Revolutionary Guards Corps (IRGC), a branch of the Iranian military, in collaboration with the Lebanese group Hezbollah, and the Yemeni Houthis, launched attacks against Israel using drones, cruise missiles, and ballistic missiles. Iran stated that the operation was done in retaliation for the Israeli airstrike on an Iranian consulate annex in Damascus, used by the IRGC, two weeks earlier. The operation was part of the Gaza war spillover and marked Iran's first direct attack on Israel since the start of their proxy conflict.

Israel stated that 99 percent of the drones and missiles were destroyed by a coalition during Operation Iron Shield, most before entering Israeli airspace, while a US official said that at least nine Iranian missiles had struck two Israeli airbases, causing minor damage. The missiles caused minor damage to the Nevatim Airbase in southern Israel, which remained operational. An international coalition, including the US, UK, France and Jordan assisted Israel in intercepting Iranian projectiles and in radar coverage. In Israel, a 7-year-old Israeli Bedouin girl was seriously wounded, and thirty-one other people either suffered minor injuries while rushing to shelters or were treated for anxiety. Jordan reported some shrapnel falling on its territory, causing no significant damage or injuries.

Iran's attacks drew criticism from the United Nations, several world leaders, and political analysts, who warned that they risk escalating into a full-blown regional war. In the following days, Iran intensified its threats, promising a strong retaliation to any strikes from Israel. Moreover, on 18 April, Iran said that it might expedite its nuclear program if its nuclear installations come under attack.

== Strikes ==
=== Iran ===
Reports from Iranian media and on social media platforms indicated that there were explosions near Isfahan, in a province known for nuclear sites, a major airbase, and a drone manufacturing facility. Specifically, the state-operated Islamic Republic News Agency (IRNA) reported that air defenses were activated at Shekari air base in Isfahan, which hosts Iran's fleet of American-made F-14 Tomcats, which had been acquired prior to the Iranian Revolution in 1979. Additionally, air defense systems were activated in various provinces after unidentified aerial objects were spotted. IRNA reported that its journalists did not observe any significant damage or explosions throughout the nation, and no disturbances were recorded at any of Iran's nuclear sites. Three Iranian officials told The New York Times that the strike hit the airbase. US officials later stated that a missile from Israel struck Iran.

According to a senior US official speaking to ABC News, Israeli aircraft, operating beyond Iran's borders, launched three missiles targeting an air defense radar site guarding the Natanz nuclear facility. The official further stated that the assessment indicated the successful destruction of the targeted site. He also said that the objective of the strike was to communicate to Iran Israel's capabilities without escalating tensions further.

Satellite imagery obtained by Umbra revealed damage sustained by an Iranian S-300PMU2 surface-to-air missile system 30N6E radar in Isfahan. According to The Economist, satellite imagery indicates that the Iranians attempted to preserve their reputation after the Israeli attacks by replacing the destroyed air-defense radar with a new one.

=== Possible related strikes ===
==== Syria ====
SOHR reported that Israeli strikes hit Syrian Army radar positions in As-Suwayda Governorate and Daraa Governorate in southern Syria. In a statement, Syria's defense ministry confirmed the strikes, stating that Israel carried out an attack using missiles, targeting air defense sites in the southern region and causing material damage. A former senior US defence official said this was compatible with Israel "clearing the air corridor in Syria for a stand-off strike on Iran" and the discovery of spent missile boosters in Iraq.

==== Iraq ====
Explosions were also reported in the morning in Baghdad governorate and Babil Governorate. Fighter jets were heard in Erbil and Mosul. The booster of an Israeli air-launched ballistic missile was discovered south of Baghdad, indicating that Israeli aircraft had launched their missiles at Iran within Iraqi airspace. The Financial Times reported experts identifying the missile from the booster remnants as most likely the Blue Sparrow or possibly the ROCKS.

== Aftermath ==
Iran subsequently announced the suspension of commercial flights in Tehran and in the country's western and central areas. At Imam Khomeini International Airport in Tehran, loudspeakers reportedly informed passengers of the situation. Normal flight operations were later restored, according to Iranian authorities. Several airlines diverted their aircraft away from Iranian airspace; at least eight flights were rerouted. State media in Iran announced the temporary suspension of flights across the country, a restriction lifted later that morning. Details regarding the scope and impact of the attack remain unclear.

Iranian media reported that no casualties or damage had occurred. Iran's semi-official Tasnim News Agency posted a video of a nuclear facility in Isfahan which did not show any damage or signs it had been hit. The International Atomic Energy Agency confirmed that no damage has occurred to Iran's nuclear sites.

Iran is the third-largest producer in oil cartel OPEC and therefore there were concerns about the rise in oil prices. Andy Lipow, president of Lipow Oil Associates, said that "Any attack on oil production or export facilities in Iran would drive the price of Brent crude oil to $100, and the closure of the Strait of Hormuz would lead to prices in the $120 to $130 range."

== Analysis ==
According to an analysis by The Jerusalem Post, the attack, strategically close to a nuclear site, was designed to send a deliberate message: that Israel has the capability to target more critical sites but chose restraint at this time. This approach demonstrated Israel's readiness to defend its interests whilst also signaling to Iran the potential for more severe action, thereby maintaining a balance of deterrence without provoking an immediate escalation into a broader conflict.

The BBC likewise noted that a calculated strike on military targets associated with Iran's previous attack on Israel demonstrated the IDF's capabilities, including the capability of not using them in full. The attack was so calibrated that the Iranian regime "downplayed, dismissed and even mocked that anything of consequence happened at all".

Haaretz opined that the strike was lackluster and muted, a placeholder measure demonstrative of Netanyahu's lack of strategy, and a diversion from the primary issue of the Israel-Gaza War and the rescue of Hamas' hostages.

The New York Times gauged the limited strike as smaller than expected, and that while Iranian officials downplayed it, and indeed did not even ascribe it to Israel, there was still room for miscalculation. The Wall Street Journal also noted that while the immediate escalatory spiral had been stopped, the fundamental dynamic between Israel and Iran remained, and that its new situation had unclear red lines.

In his assessment of the Israeli attack, David Ignatius of The Washington Post observed that Israel demonstrated dominance by initiating and concluding strikes at will, reflecting what experts term 'escalation dominance' by delivering the first and last blow. He also discussed Israel's leadership in a regional coalition against Iran, emphasizing its focus on long-term strategies over immediate retaliation. Ignatius noted also Israel's consideration of the interests of coalition partners Saudi Arabia, the United Arab Emirates, and Jordan, which supported Israel's action against Iran quietly.

According to an analysis by The Economist, following the Israeli attack, the Iranians replaced the destroyed tombstone radar with a different "cheese board" radar in the same spot. It pointed out that while "Iran is unlikely to fool America or Israel, both of which have high-end satellites and will know that the battery is kaput," the new radar enables the country's propagandists to assert that everything is under control, potentially averting a larger crisis.

== Reactions ==
In his first comment on the strikes on 21 April, Iran's Supreme Leader Ayatollah Ali Khamenei said that "debates by the other party" on the aspects of the strikes "secondary importance".

The Israel Defense Forces told CNN that they "do not have a comment at this time." A senior United States official confirmed that Israel had conducted a strike and noted that the US was notified by Israel in advance of the operation. An Iranian official told Reuters that the explosions were due to the activation of Iran's air defense systems, and added that there had been no missile attack on Iran.

Israel minister of national security Itamar Ben-Gvir described the attack as "feeble" or "lame" on Twitter. BBC security correspondent Frank Gardener labeled the attack as "limited, almost symbolic".

Australia advised its citizens to leave Israel and the Occupied Palestinian Territories given that the security situation could deteriorate quickly, and the US limited the travel of its embassy personnel to metropolitan regions for similar reasons.

On 5 May 2024, two weeks after the attacks, Israeli transportation minister and member of cabinet Miri Regev confirmed Israeli responsibility for the strikes.

On 22 October 2024, Aziz Jafari, the former commander of the Islamic Revolutionary Guard Corps, admitted for the first time to Israel's "missile attack" on Iran. He said Israel fired "several missiles" at the Isfahan airbase with "advanced American aircraft" and permission from some countries to use their airspaces.

On 10 November 29, 2024, Mohammad Jafar Asadi, one of the IRGC commanders, admitted to damaging one of Iran's military equipment. Israel "hit a car that was not very expensive, no casualties" he said.

== See also ==
- 2023 Iran drone attacks
- Gaza war
- Israel–Hezbollah conflict (2023–present)
- Iran–Israel proxy conflict
- Iranian seizure of the MSC Aries
