= ROCKS (missile) =

ROCKS Autonomous Extended Stand-Off Range Air-to-Surface Missile
- Type: Air-to-surface missile
- Place of origin: Israel

Service history
- In service: 2019–present
- Used by: Israeli Air Force

Production history
- Designer: Rafael Advanced Defense Systems
- Manufacturer: Rafael Advanced Defense Systems

Specifications
- Warhead: Penetration or blast fragmentation warhead
- Operational range: 250–300 km (160–190 mi)
- Maximum speed: Supersonic
- Guidance system: INS/GPS; EO/Anti-Radiation seeker
- Launch platform: Fighter Aircraft

ROCKS is an autonomous extended stand-off range air-to-surface missile developed by Rafael Advanced Defense Systems. Designed to engage high-value stationary and relocatable targets, the missile is particularly effective in GPS-denied environments. It incorporates technologies from Rafael's existing systems such as Popeye and SPICE, and uses a Sparrow target missile booster.

The missile offers several key features, such as high accuracy with a Circular Error Probable of 3 metres (9.8 ft), day and night operation in all weather conditions, and resistance to electronic jamming. It is equipped with either a penetration or blast fragmentation warhead and can be deployed well outside of enemy air defense coverage.

For navigation and target acquisition, ROCKS uses a combination of inertial navigation system, Global Positioning System (GPS), and an electro-optical seeker. The terminal guidance employs scene-matching technology or anti-radiation homing to ensure target destruction, even in scenarios where GPS is compromised.

The ROCKS can be launched from an F-16 or F-35.

The missile was first revealed at the 2019 Aero India show in Bangalore. The Financial Times reported that the missile was possibly used in the 2024 Israeli strikes on Iran.
