= Escalation dominance =

Strategic concept of controlling the escalation of a conflict

Escalation dominance refers to a nation's ability to control the escalation ladder in a conflict, ensuring that it can escalate or de-escalate the situation to its advantage.

== Examples ==
After the April 2024 Israeli strikes on Iran, David Ignatius of The Washington Post argued that Israel was demonstrating escalation dominance by initiating and concluding the strikes in a measured fashion.

== See also ==
- Conflict escalation
- De-escalation
