= Sparrow (target missile) =

Israeli air-launched ballistic missile

The Sparrow (Hebrew: אנקור, pronounced [anˈkor]) target missile is an Israeli medium-range air-launched ballistic missile produced by Rafael Advanced Defense Systems.

The missile was used initially in 2013 as a target missile to test the Arrow anti-ballistic missile system. The missile has a modular warhead section and is capable of carrying a high-explosive warhead.

By 2024, air-to-surface versions of the missile were used in attacks on Iran: Blue Sparrow in 2024 and Black Sparrow in 2026, for the initial standoff attacks of the 2026 Iran War.

== Versions ==
There are three versions of the missile: Black Sparrow, Blue Sparrow, and Silver Sparrow, each with a different maximum range and maximum speed to simulate different ballistic missiles. Black Sparrow simulated Scud missiles. The Silver Sparrow version is designed to simulate Iranian Shahab-3 class ballistic missiles with a 1,500–2,000 km range. The Blue Sparrow has a total length of 6.51 metres (21.4 ft), weight of 1,900 kilograms (4,200 lb) and a range of 2,000 kilometres (1,200 mi) on a high ballistic trajectory.

The Rafael ROCKS stand-off range air-to-surface missile is a conversion of the Sparrow target missile into an offensive weapon.

The "Golden Horizon" missile might be another Sparrow derivative, possibly designed to target underground bunkers. It was reported in February 2026 that Golden Horizon had been offered to the Indian Air Force as a long-range air-launched ballistic missile to be integrated on upgraded Sukhoi Su-30MKI platforms.

== Operational history ==
The Silver Sparrow version was first tested on September 2, 2013. The launch from the Mediterranean was detected by a Russian ballistic missile early warning radar at Armavir, followed by Israeli acknowledgement of the test over an hour later.

The Financial Times reported experts identifying the Blue Sparrow, from its booster remnants, as the missile used in the April 2024 Israeli strikes on Iran.

The New York Times reported that the Israeli Air Force utilized the Black Sparrow variant to destroy Iranian surface-to-air missile batteries during the 2026 Iran war. The Times of India further reported that a Blue Sparrow was used to kill Iran's supreme leader Ali Khamenei.
