= Arrow (missile family) =

Israeli anti-ballistic missile family

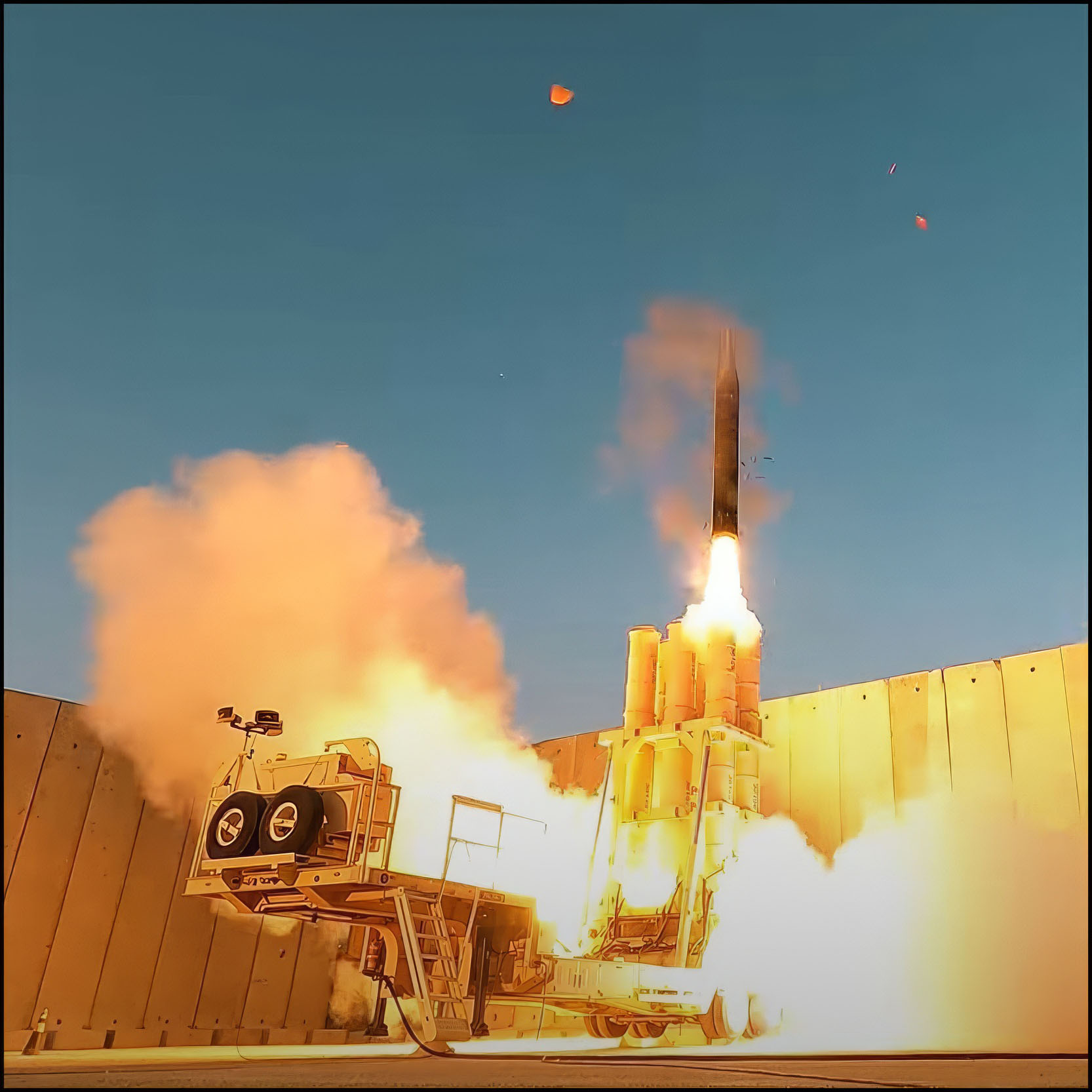
- Arrow 3 launched during Operation Rising Lion, 2025.
- Type: Anti-ballistic missile
- Place of origin: Israel; United States

Service history
- In service: 2000–present
- Used by: Israel
- Wars: March 2017 Israel–Syria incident; Gaza war; 2024 Israel–Iran conflict; Iran–Israel war

Production history
- Designer: Israel Aerospace Industries, Boeing
- Designed: 1994–present
- Manufacturer: Israel Aerospace Industries, Boeing Defense, Space & Security
- Unit cost: US$3 million (as of 2003)
- Produced: 1994–present

Specifications
- Mass: 1,300 kg (2,900 lb) – "missile itself"; 2,800 kg (6,200 lb) – officially; 3,500 kg (7,700 lb) – sealed canister
- Length: 6.8 m (22 ft) – 7 m (23 ft): 3.45 m (11.3 ft) – booster section; 0.75 m (2.5 ft) – sustainer section; 2.75 m (9.0 ft) – kill vehicle section
- Diameter: By stage: 800 mm (31 in) – 1st stage; 500 mm (20 in) – 2nd stage
- Wingspan: 820 mm (32 in)
- Warhead: Directed high explosive fragmentation
- Warhead weight: 150 kg (330 lb)
- Detonation mechanism: Proximity fuze
- Engine: Two-stage
- Propellant: Solid propellant
- Operational range: 90 km (56 mi) – 150 km (93 mi)
- Flight ceiling: Endo-exo atmospheric
- Maximum speed: Arrow 2: Mach 9, means 3 km/s (1.9 mi/s), Arrow 3: classified, mach 12-17
- Guidance system: Dual mode: passive infrared seeker and active radar seeker
- Steering system: Thrust vectoring and four aerodynamic control moving fins
- Accuracy: Within 4 m (13 ft) of the target
- Launch platform: Six canisters per trailer-mounted erector–launcher

The Arrow or Hetz (Hebrew: חֵץ, pronounced [ˈχet͡s] or pronounced [ˈħet͡s]) is a family of anti-ballistic missiles designed to fulfill an Israeli requirement for a missile defense system that would be more effective against ballistic missiles than the MIM-104 Patriot surface-to-air missile. Jointly funded and produced by Israel and the United States, development of the system began in 1986 and has continued since. Undertaken by the MALAM division of the Israel Aerospace Industries (IAI) and Boeing, it is overseen by the Israeli Ministry of Defense's "Homa" (Hebrew: חומה, pronounced [χoma], "rampart") administration and the U.S. Missile Defense Agency. It forms the long-range layer of Israel's multi-tiered missile defence system, along with David's Sling (at medium-to-long range) and Iron Dome and Iron Beam [experimental] (at short ranges).

The Arrow system consists of the joint production supersonic Arrow anti-missile interceptors, Arrow 2 and Arrow 3, the Elta EL/M-2080 "Green Pine" and "Great Pine" early-warning AESA radars, the Elisra "Golden Citron" ("Citron Tree") C^{3}I center, and the Israel Aerospace Industries "Brown Hazelnut" ("Hazelnut Tree") launch control center. The system is mobile and can be moved to other prepared sites.

In recognition of its strategic importance and technological achievement, the Arrow system was awarded the Israel Defense Prize in 2003.

Following the construction and testing of the Arrow 1 technology demonstrator, production and deployment began with the Arrow 2 version of the missile. The Arrow is considered one of the most advanced missile defense programs in existence. It is the first operational missile defense system specifically designed and built to intercept and destroy ballistic missiles. The first Arrow battery was declared fully operational in October 2000 and is operated by the Protective Sword unit under the Air Defense Command of the Israeli Air Force (IAF). Although several of its components have been exported, the Air Defense Command is the sole user of the complete Arrow system.

The spaceflight upper-tier portion of Israel's missile defense, Arrow 3, was declared operational on January 18, 2017. Arrow 3 operates at greater speeds, greater range and at greater altitudes than Arrow 2, intercepting ballistic missiles during the space-flight portion of their trajectory. According to the chairman of the Israeli Space Agency, Arrow 3 may serve as an anti-satellite weapon, which would make Israel one of the world's few countries capable of shooting down satellites.

== Background ==
The Arrow program was launched in light of the acquisition by Arab states of long-range surface-to-surface missiles. It was chosen over RAFAEL Armament Development Authority's AB-10 missile defense system since the Arrow was judged to be a more complete concept and have greater range. The AB-10 system was criticized as being merely an improved MIM-23 Hawk, rather than a system designed from the outset for missile interception.

The United States and Israel signed a memorandum of understanding to co-fund the Arrow program on May 6, 1986, and in 1988 the United States Department of Defense Strategic Defense Initiative Organization (SDIO) placed an order with Israel Aircraft Industries for the Arrow 1 technology demonstrator. (Note: Over the years SDIO was renamed to Ballistic Missile Defense Organization (BMDO), and later to Missile Defense Agency (MDA), while Israel Aircraft Industries was renamed to Israel Aerospace Industries.) The Gulf War, which exposed the controversial performance of the Patriot missile against Iraqi "Al Hussein" missiles, gave further impetus to the development of the Arrow. It was initially designed to intercept missiles such as the SS-1 "Scud", its "Al Hussein" derivative, the SS-21 "Scarab" operated by Syria, and the CSS-2 operated by Saudi Arabia. The Arrow evolved also with an eye on the advanced missile programs of Iran. Yitzhak Rabin, then Defense Minister of Israel, viewed the emerging missile threat as one of the most dangerous future threats on Israel's security. He said of the program that:

I had the honor, during my term of office as Minister of Defense, in the National Unity Government, to vote in favor of Israel's participation in the Strategic Defense Initiative... introduced by President Reagan...

The Israeli Administration for the Development of Weapons and Technological Infrastructure, part of the Israeli Ministry of Defense, runs the Arrow development project under the "Homa" administration. The "Homa" administration, which is also commonly referred to as the IMDO – Israel Missile Defense Organization, is responsible for coordinating industrial activities of Israel's different defense companies involved in the development of the Arrow system.

=== Funding ===
The multibillion-dollar development program of the Arrow is undertaken in Israel with the financial support of the United States. When the development program began, the projection for the total cost of its development and manufacture, including the initial production of missiles, was an estimated $1.6 billion. The price of a single Arrow missile was estimated at $3 million. Between 1989 and 2007 some $2.4 billion had been reportedly invested in the Arrow program, 50–80 percent of which was funded by the United States. Israel contributes approximately $65 million annually.

U.S. contributions to Arrow 2 program by fiscal year. Figures in millions of U.S. dollars.
1990	1991	1992	1993	1994	1995	1996	1997	1998	1999
52	42	54.4	57.76	56.4	47.4	59.352	35	94.874	46.924
2000	2001	2002	2003	2004	2005	2006	2007	2008	2009
79.985	92.025	126.395	124.594	135.644	152.048	122.866	117.494	98.572	74.342
2010	2011	2012	2013	2014	2015	2016	2017	2018	2019
72.306	66.427	58.995	40.800	44.363	56.201	56.519	67.331	82.300	163.000
2020	2021	2022	2023	2024	2025	2026	2027	2028	2029
159.000	173.000								

=== Criticism and opposition ===
The Arrow program encountered opposition from the Israeli Air Force, whose traditional doctrine of deterrence and use of preemptive strikes stand in sharp contrast with the nature of the missile. In addition, the IAF feared that the procurement of the costly missiles would diminish the resources allocated towards offensive projects such as fighter aircraft.

A criticism of the concept of missile defense for Israel was aired by Reuven Pedatzur in a comprehensive study published in 1993 by the Jaffee Center for Strategic Studies. (Note: Forerunner of the Institute for National Security Studies (INSS).) The arguments made in the study conformed to the opinions of numerous defense officials and analysts, and echoed many of the arguments made by the Strategic Defense Initiative critics in the United States.

Pedatzur argued that it was exceedingly simple to fool an Arrow-type defensive system with simple, cheap, and easily installed countermeasures, which would render the Arrow system ineffective. He doubted Israel's defense industries could rise to the challenge of such a complex system, citing anonymous experts in the Israel Defense Forces (IDF) who predicted that the system would not be available before 2010. He envisaged enormous costs, around $10 billion, that would distort budgeting priorities and divert funds from the vital enhancement of the IDF's warfighting capability, thus forcing a profound revision of Israel's national security doctrine. He further argued that even if effective against missiles with conventional, chemical or biological warheads, the Arrow would not be relevant against future threats of missiles with nuclear warheads, since it would never be able to supply hermetic defense and the impact of even a single nuclear warhead in Israel's densely populated urban area would be an existential threat to Israel.

At the same time, John E. Pike, who worked then with the Federation of American Scientists, stated that "given technical problems with the systems radar and command system, coupled with its high development cost, the Arrow program may soon fall by the wayside". Victoria Samson, a research associate of the Center for Defense Information, also stated in October 2002 that the Arrow system cannot track an incoming missile that has split its warhead into submunitions.

In June 2003 a group of Israeli chief engineers, co-inventors, and project managers of IAI and subcontractors were awarded the Israel Defense Prize for the development and production of the Arrow system.

According to Uzi Rubin, the first Director of IMDO, over time, most of the pessimistic predictions have proven to be unfounded. Israel's defense industries overcame the technical challenge, the system's development was completed a full decade ahead of what was predicted, and there are no indications that the expenditures for the Arrow harmed other IDF procurement plans to any degree whatsoever. Rubin insists that Israel's missile defense is now an established fact and that most of the warnings issued by critics have failed to materialize. Pedatzur, however, remained unconvinced.

== Development ==
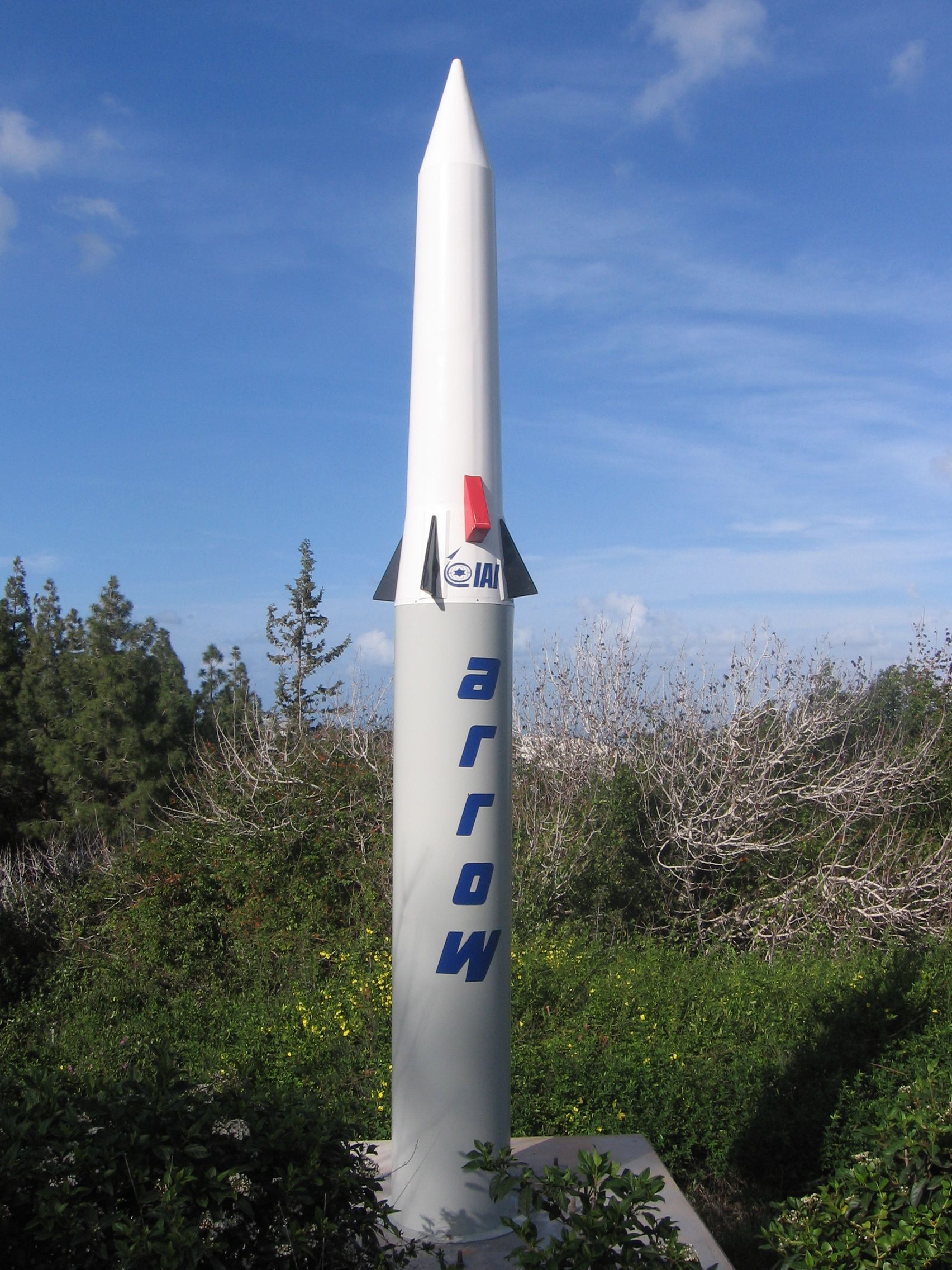
A mockup of the Arrow 1, near the Technion's Faculty of Aerospace Engineering.

=== Arrow 1 ===
The first launch of the Arrow interceptor took place on August 9, 1990, designed to test the missile's control and guidance systems. The test came to a halt seconds after takeoff, and the missile was intentionally destroyed due to fears it might go off track and hit a settled location. This was caused by the failure of the ground tracking radars to track the missile's trajectory. Test number two took place on March 25, 1991. Designed to check missile components during launch, it was conducted from a ship at sea. Once again, a missile malfunction resulted in the aborting of the experiment. A third test, designed to examine the Arrow's interception capabilities, was conducted on October 31, 1991. The missile was once again launched from a ship at sea, and was once more aborted because of a repeat of previous malfunctions.

On September 23, 1992, in another test of the missile components during launch, the systems finally operated as planned, and the Arrow reached its designated point in the sky, 45 seconds after launch. As planned, the missile was then destroyed. This successful experiment ended the system's preliminary testing phase. The fifth, sixth, and seventh tests took place on February 28, July 14, and October 14, 1993, respectively. During these, the Arrow managed to pass close to the target missiles, thereby proving its ability to intercept surface-to-surface missiles. During test number eight on March 1, 1994, the missile was not launched due to a ground computer failure. The ninth test launch on June 12, 1994, also known as ATD#1 (Arrow Demonstration Test 1), saw an Arrow 1 successfully intercepting a target missile launched from a ship anchored in the middle of the Mediterranean.

The Arrow 1 was reportedly a two-stage solid propellant missile, with an overall length of 7.5 m (25 ft), a body diameter of 1,200 mm (47 in), and a launch weight of around 2,000 kg (4,400 lb). It was estimated that the second stage had a length of 2.5 m (8.2 ft), and that it had inertial and command update mid-course guidance, with a terminal infrared focal plane array. The missile was described as being relatively high-speed and maneuverable, with thrust vectoring in both stages. The range capability has been described as around 50 km (31 mi). On the other hand, the Arrow 1 could be a single stage missile. Development of the "big and cumbersome" Arrow 1 then ceased and further research continued with the "smaller, faster and more lethal" Arrow 2.

=== Arrow 2 ===
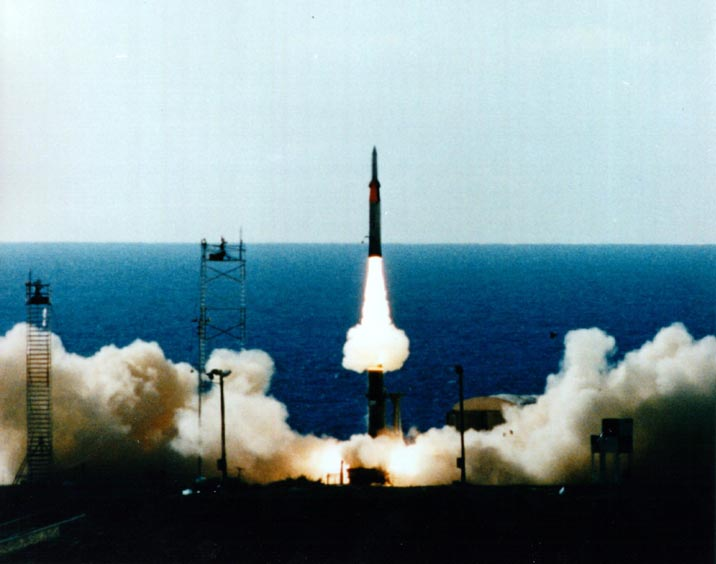
Arrow 2 launch in February 1996.

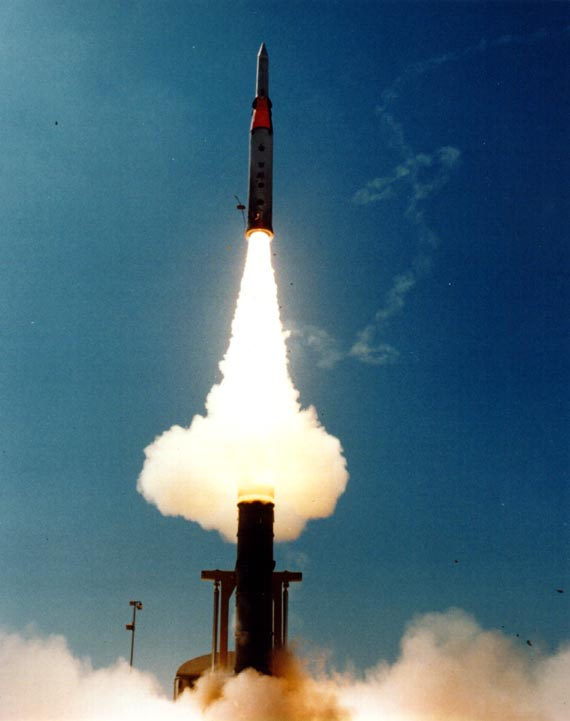
Arrow 2 launch in August 1996.

Two successful tests (designated IIT#21 and IIT#22) of the steering, control, and cruising systems were conducted without target missiles on July 30, 1995, and February 20, 1996. Two successful interceptions took place on August 20, 1996, and March 11, 1997, and were designated AIT#21 and AIT#22. Another interception test (AIT#23) was conducted on August 20, 1997, but the missile was destroyed when its steering system malfunctioned. The fault was corrected in time to ensure the success of AST#3, the first comprehensive test of the entire system. On September 14, 1998, all system components successfully countered a computer-simulated threat. On November 29, 1998, Israel Aerospace Industries delivered the first operational Arrow 2 interceptor to the Israeli Ministry of Defense.

A full system interception test (AST#4) was held on November 1, 1999. During this test, the Arrow system located, tracked, and intercepted a TM-91C target missile simulating a "Scud" missile, launched on a very steep trajectory from a ship located offshore. The IAI TM-91C target missile was itself based on the Arrow 1 interceptor. On March 14, 2000, the first complete Arrow 2 battery was rolled out in a ceremony at Palmachim Airbase. In his speech, then IAF commander Aluf Eitan Ben Eliyahu said:

This is a great day for the Air Defense Forces, for the Air Force, the defense establishment and, I would say, for the State of Israel. As of today, we have completed the acceptance of the only weapon system of its kind in the entire world. We are the first to succeed in developing, building and operating a defense system against ballistic missiles.

Another Arrow 2 test (AST#5) took place on September 14, 2000, this time with a new target missile, the Rafael Advanced Defense Systems "Black Sparrow". This airborne ballistic target missile, launched by an IAF F-15 towards Israel's coastline at a ballistic trajectory simulating an aggressor "Scud", was intercepted and destroyed. Consequently, the following month saw the Palmachim Arrow battery declared operational by the Israeli Air Defense Command. The "Black Sparrow" has since been used as the aggressor target in the AST#6, AST#9, and AST#10 tests. Reportedly, in June 2001 Arrow missiles were test-fired in the course of a joint American-Israeli-Turkish exercise code-named Anatolian Eagle, in the southeast of Turkey. On August 27, 2001 (AST#6), the Arrow system successfully intercepted its target at some 100 km (62 mi) from shore, the highest and farthest that the Arrow 2 had been tested to date. In October 2002 the second battery was declared operational.

In June 2003, a team of senior engineers, co-inventors, and project managers from Israel Aerospace Industries (IAI) and its subcontractors were awarded the Israel Defense Prize for the development and production of the Arrow missile defense system.

==== Block-2 ====
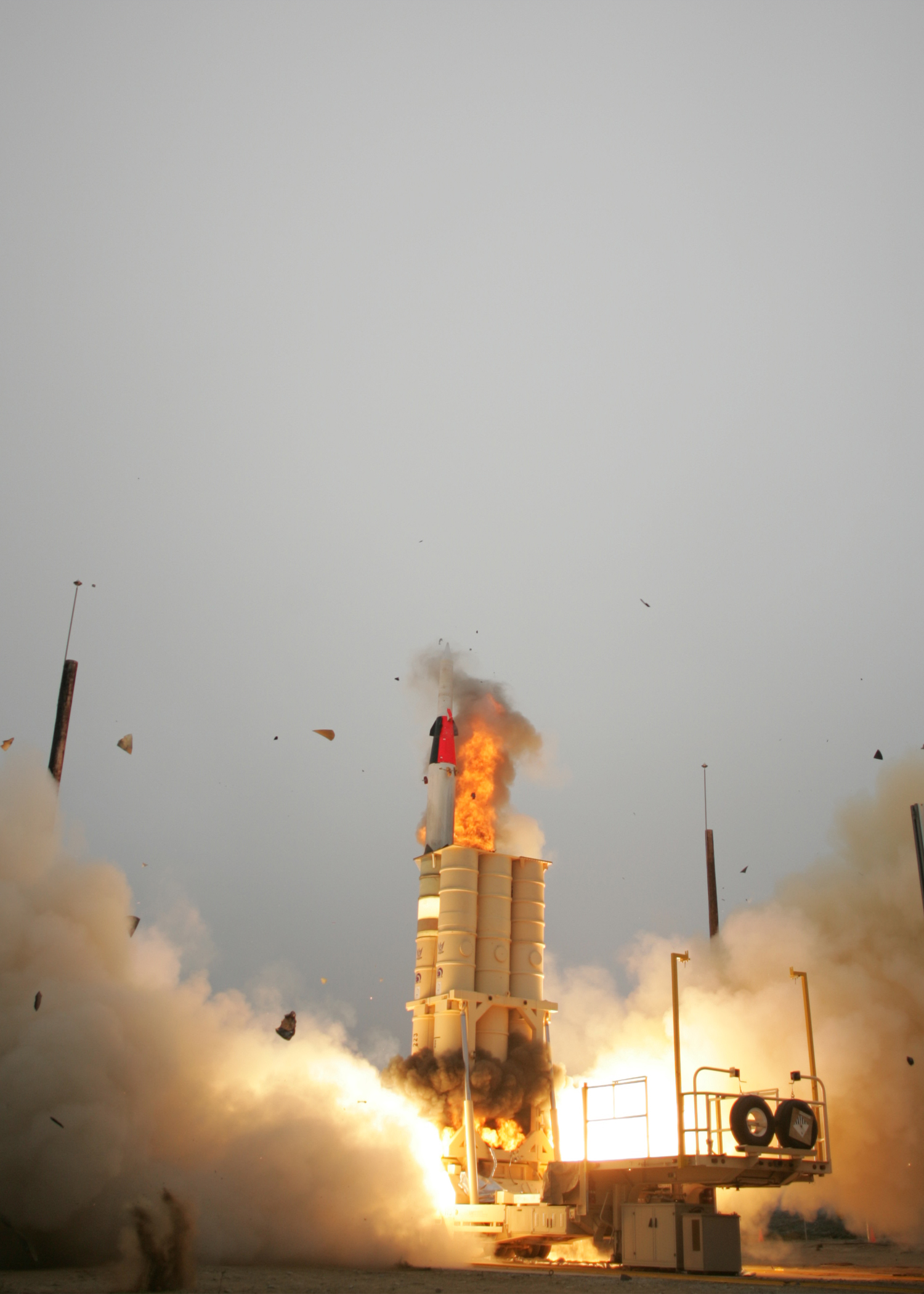
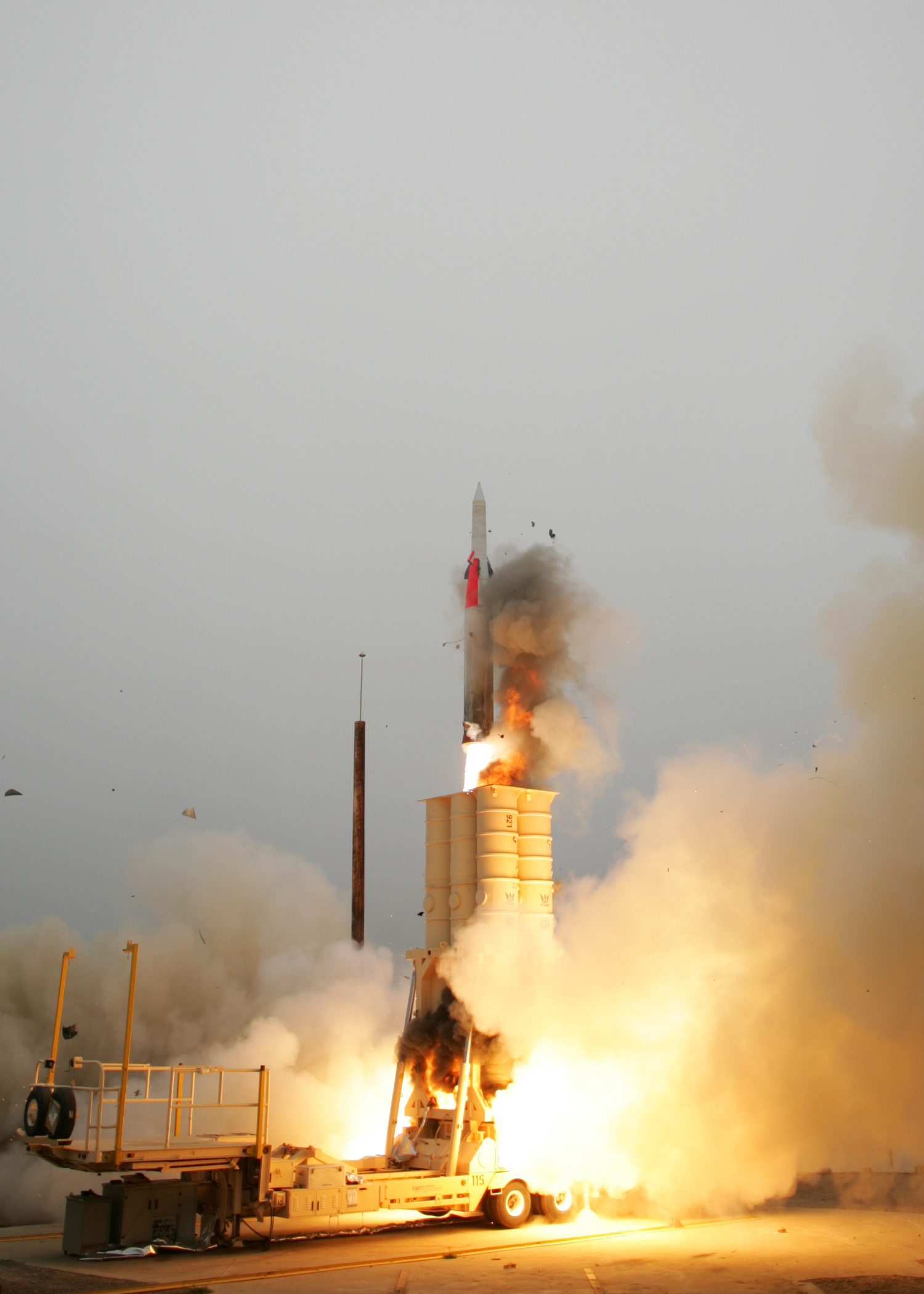
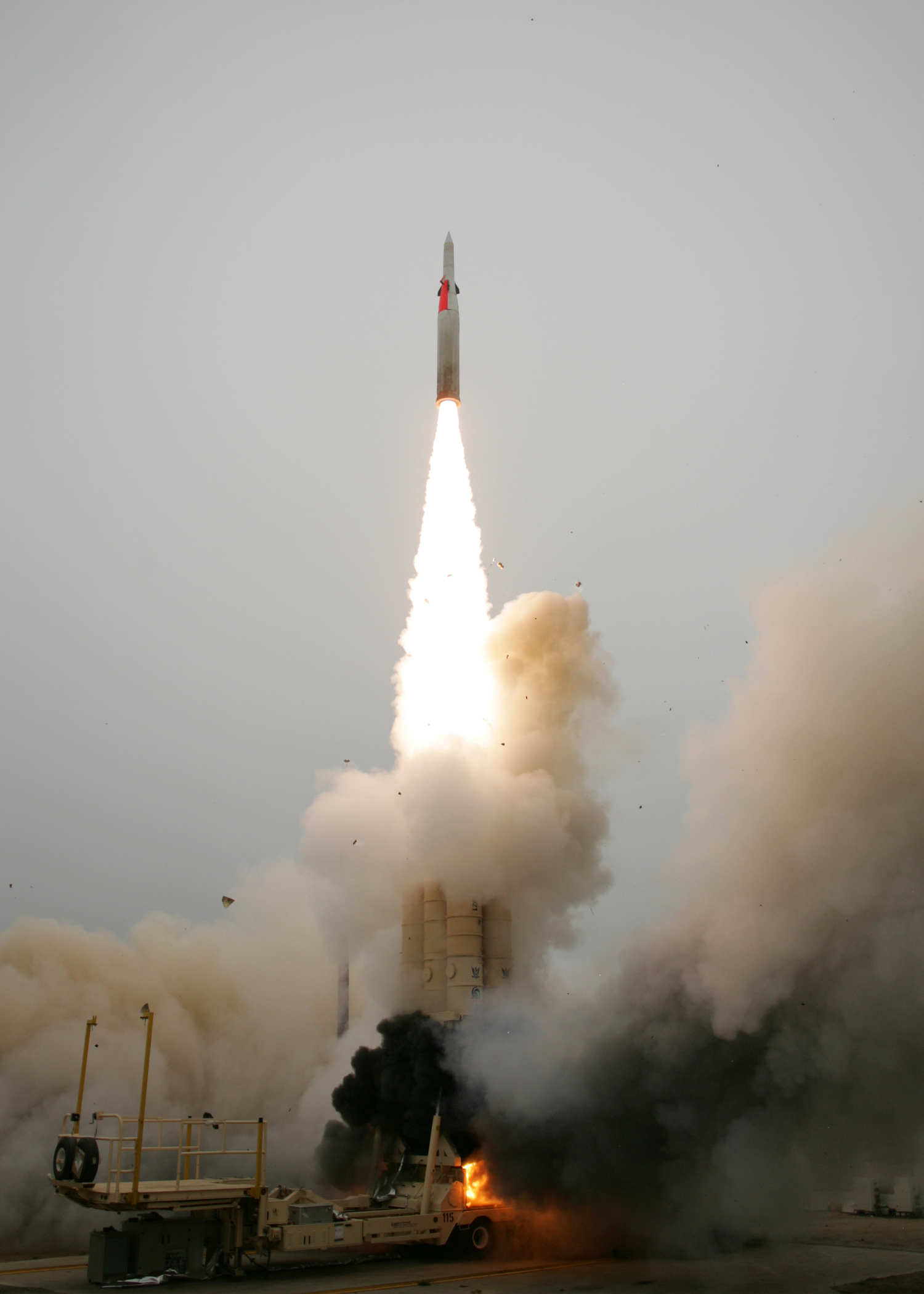
Arrow 2 launch on August 26, 2004, during AST USFT#2.

A successful test of the Arrow 2 Block-2 took place on January 5, 2003 (AST#8). Four missiles were launched towards four simulated targets in order to examine the interceptor's performance during special flight conditions as well as system performance during a sequence of launches. The test did not include actual interceptions. Another successful test held on December 16, 2003 (AST#9), examined the system's ability to intercept and destroy incoming missiles at significantly high altitudes, around 60 km (37 mi). Reportedly, AST#8 and AST#9 also tested integration of the Arrow with Patriot batteries.

On July 29, 2004, Israel and the United States carried out a joint test at the Naval Air Station Point Mugu (NAS Point Mugu) Missile Test Center in California, in which the Arrow interceptor was launched against a real "Scud-B" missile. The test represented a realistic scenario that could not have been tested in Israel due to test-field safety restrictions. To enable the test a full battery was shipped to Point Mugu. The "Green Pine" radar and command-and-control systems were deployed at the base, while the Arrow launcher was installed 100 km (62 mi) offshore on an island that forms part of the test range. The test was a success, with the interceptor destroying the "Scud" that flew a 300 km (190 mi) trajectory at an altitude of 40 km (25 mi), west of San Nicolas Island. This was the twelfth Arrow interceptor test and the seventh test of the complete system, the first interception of a real "Scud". This significant test became known as the AST USFT#1. Following this test, then Defense Minister of Israel, Shaul Mofaz, said:

We are in an age of uncertainty. Countries in the 'third circle' [Iran] are continuing their efforts to acquire non-conventional capabilities along with long-ranged launch capabilities. The Arrow is the best missile system of its kind in the world, and represents a force multiplier for our future force.

AST USFT#2 was conducted at NAS Point Mugu a month later, on August 26. This test was aimed at examining the Arrow's ability to detect a splitting warhead of a separating ballistic missile. It detected the true target, but a technical malfunction reportedly prevented it from maneuvering to strike it, leading to a suspension of testing. In March–April 2005 the ability of "Green Pine" and "Golden Citron" to work with Patriot system elements operated by U.S. Army was successfully tested against simulated "Scud"-type targets during regular series of U.S.–Israeli biennial exercises code-named "Juniper Cobra". Actual testing of the complete Arrow system was resumed in December 2005, when the system successfully intercepted a target at an unspecified but reported record low altitude. This test (AST#10) was the fourteenth test of the Arrow missile and the ninth test of the complete system.

==== Block-3 ====
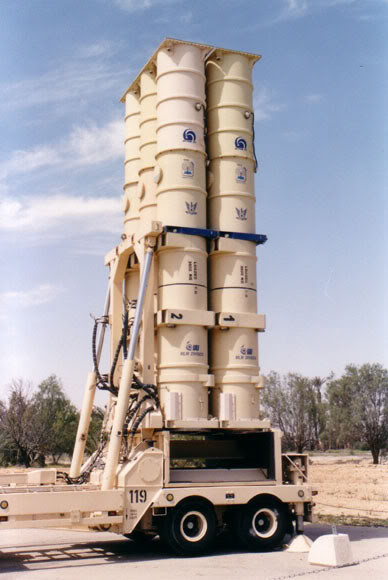
Arrow 2 launcher c. 2006–2007

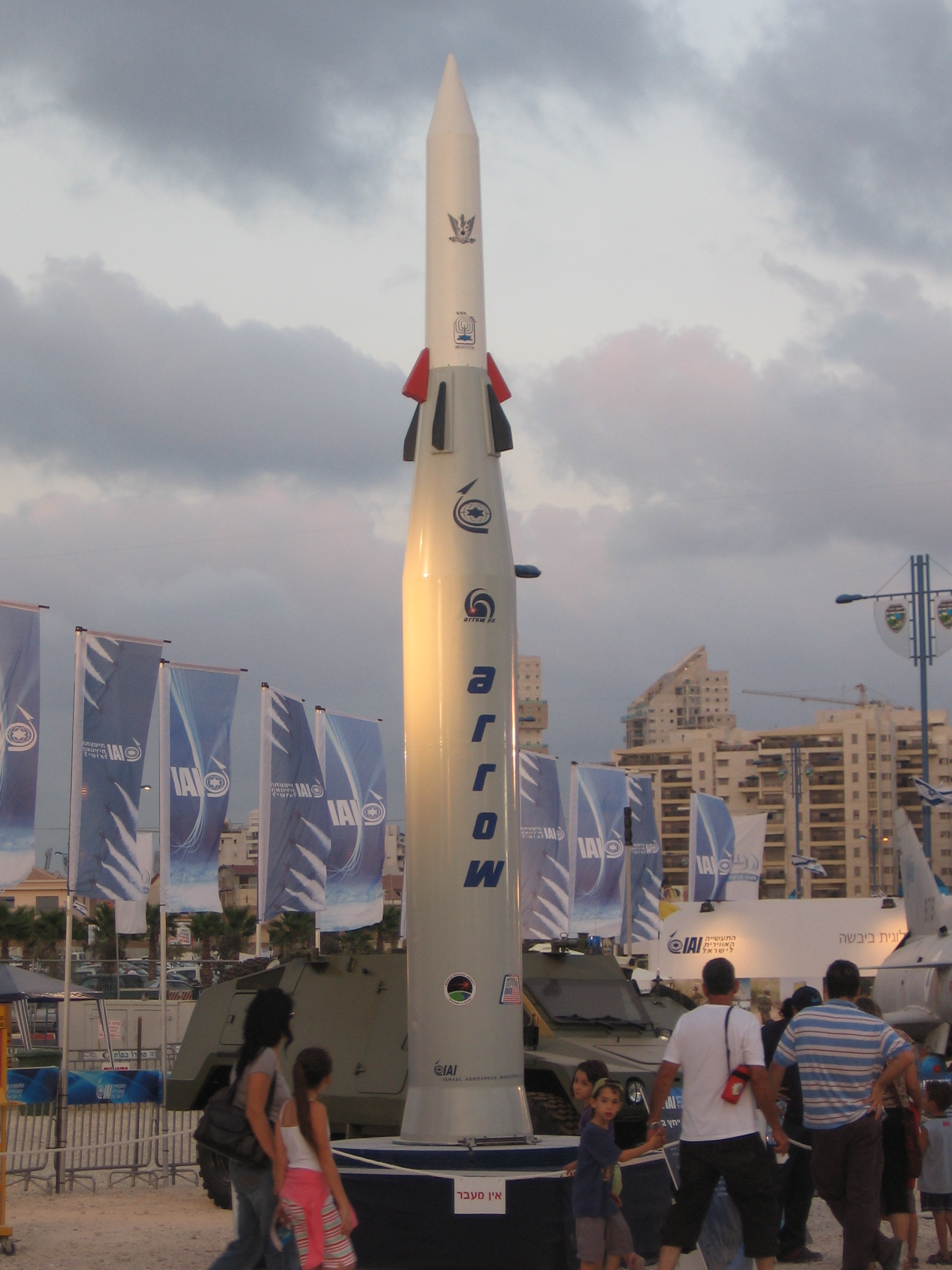
Arrow 2 on display at Rishon LeZion in September 2008

On February 11, 2007, an Arrow 2 block-3 successfully intercepted and destroyed a "Black Sparrow" target missile simulating a ballistic missile at high altitude. It was the first so-called distributed weapon system test conducted in Israel, which required two Arrow units deployed some 100 km (62 mi) apart to share data on incoming threats and coordinate launching assignments. It was also the first time the Link 16 data distribution system was used to connect two Arrow units, although the system had been used in previous tests to connect Arrow and Patriot batteries. Furthermore, an improved launcher was used. Another "Juniper Cobra" exercise ran from March 10 to 20, 2007. The computer simulation used for "Juniper Cobra 2007" was similar to the computer simulation used in "Juniper Cobra 2005".

A precursor of the next block was launched without a target on March 26, 2007, to gather information on its flight and performance, introducing unspecified modifications to its hardware and electronics and reduced manufacturing costs by some 20 percent. Arieh Herzog, then Director of IMDO, has said: "Our Arrow operational system can without a doubt deal with all of the operational threats in the Middle East, particularly in Iran and Syria."

==== Block-4 ====
On April 15, 2008, the Arrow weapon system successfully detected and made a simulated intercept of a new target missile, the "Blue Sparrow", a successor of the "Black Sparrow" capable of simulating "Scud-C/D" missiles and reportedly the Iranian Shahab-3 as well. During the test, a target missile was launched from an IAF F-15 at a height of 90,000 feet (27.5 km). The missile split into multiple warheads, making it harder to intercept. Nevertheless, "Green Pine" tracked the warhead, simulating an intercept. In September 2008 the IDF attempted a test of actual Arrow 2 block-4 missile against the "Blue Sparrow". The drill had to be aborted, however, when the target missile malfunctioned shortly after launch. Eventually the Arrow 2 block-4 was successfully tested against the "Blue Sparrow" on April 7, 2009.

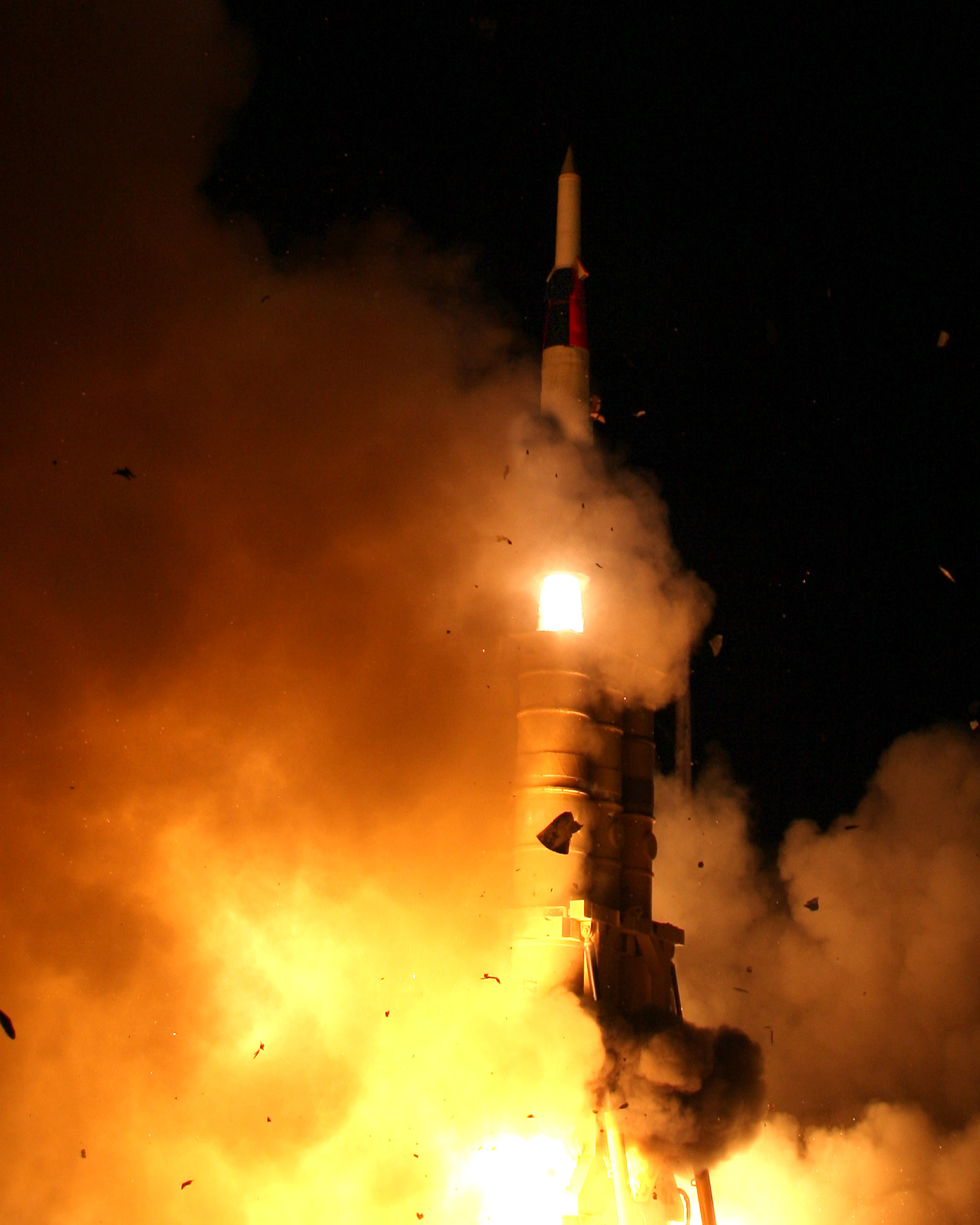
Arrow 2 launch in February 2011.

A July 22, 2009, joint test of the Arrow 2 block-4 against an airborne target missile with a range of over 1,000 km (620 mi) once again at the NAS Point Mugu, was reportedly aborted in the final second before launch after the missile failed to establish a communications link. A target had been released from a C-17 Globemaster III aircraft, the radar detected the target and transferred its tracks, but the interceptor was not launched. "Tracking of the target worked well, but tracking trajectory information that the radar transferred to the battle management center erroneously showed we would be out of the prescribed safety range, so the mission was aborted," a program source said. The aborted interception came after two earlier setbacks in the planned test, initially scheduled for July 17. The first try was scuttled due to a technical glitch in the C-17 aircraft, and a planned July 20 attempt was scrubbed due to a malfunctioning electric battery that was not providing enough power to a key element of the Arrow system. The test was widely referred to as a failure, however objectives of interoperability with other ballistic missile defense systems were achieved.

On February 22, 2011, the Arrow system successfully intercepted a long-range ballistic target missile during a flight test conducted at NAS Point Mugu. The target missile was launched from a mobile launch platform off the coast of California, within the Point Mugu test range. The test validated new block-4 versions designed to improve discriminating capabilities of the Arrow 2 interceptor. It was a body-to-body impact that completely destroyed the target.

On February 10, 2012, developers successfully conducted the final target-tracking test before the delivery of the Block-4 Arrow system. The Blue Sparrow target missile was detected and tracked by the radar, the intercept solutions were plotted by the battle management controller, and transferred to the launch units.

According to Arieh Herzog, block-4 upgrades "improve the process of discrimination of what happens in the sky and the transmission of target data for much better situational control." Block-4 upgrades also refine midcourse guidance, which, when coupled with improved target identification and discrimination capabilities, improves lethality.

Block-4.1 is expected to include a new Battle Management Center, armored launchers with high shooting availability, better communication with other missile systems, and wider ranges of interceptions. On September 9, 2014, an intercept test was conducted over the Mediterranean Sea with block-4.1 versions of the operational system. The outcome was inconclusive and remained so until the data was fully analyzed. In February 2015, an official at the IMDO acknowledged that a test was successfully acquired, but narrowly missed its target. The exact reason behind the failure was not provided, but officials initially attributed the glitch to easily correctable software issues.

==== Block-5 ====
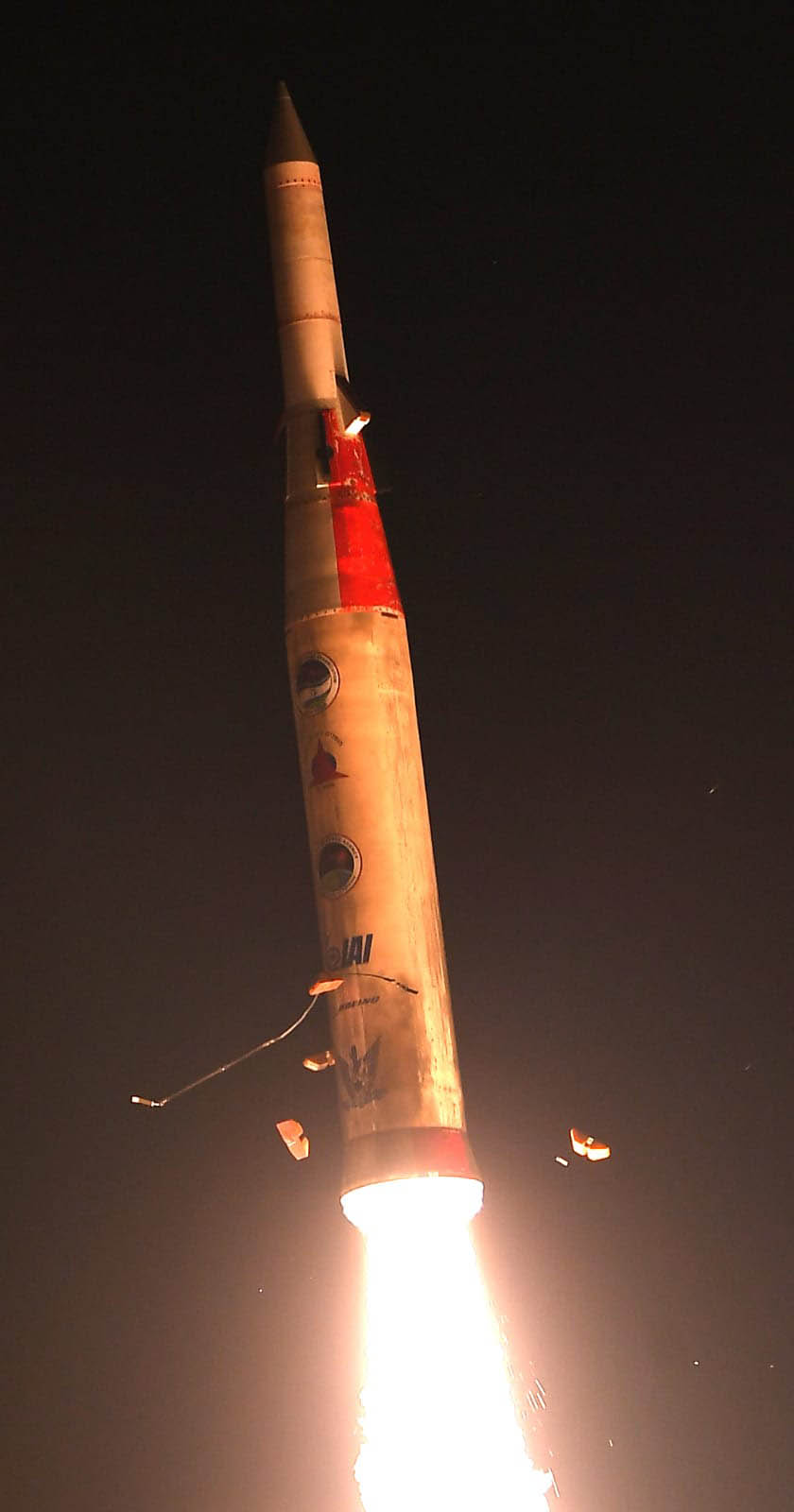
Arrow 2 launch in August 2020.

By April 2011, IMDO launched the initial definition of a new Block-5 upgrade to the complete Arrow system that will merge the lower-tier Arrow 2 and exoatmospheric Arrow 3 into a single national missile defense system. According to Arieh Herzog, the planned block-5 will include new ground- and airborne sensors, a command and control system, and a new target missile – the Silver Sparrow – to simulate potentially nuclear-capable delivery vehicles developed by Iran. According to the U.S. Missile Defense Agency, block-5 is expected to be able to deal with "more stressing regional threats" by increasing total defended area by some 50 percent.

The planned Block-5 will optimize the existing Super Green Pine radar to operate with the AN/TPY-2 radar as well as with radars commanding anti-ballistic missiles aboard United States Navy destroyers. U.S. radars will be used to support closed-loop operations if Israel and U.S. targets in the region come under attack.

Another successful Arrow 2 test (AST#18a) took place on August 12, 2020, over the Mediterranean Sea.

=== Arrow 3 ===
By August 2008, the United States and Israeli governments had initiated development of an upper-tier component to the Israeli Air Defense Command, known as Arrow 3. The development is based on an architecture definition study conducted in 2006–2007, determining the need for the upper-tier component to be integrated into Israel's ballistic missile defense system. According to Arieh Herzog, the main element of this upper tier will be an exoatmospheric interceptor, to be jointly developed by IAI and Boeing. Arrow 3 was declared operational on January 18, 2017.

Arrow 3 operates at greater speeds, greater range, and at greater altitudes than Arrow 2, intercepting ballistic missiles during the space-flight portion of their trajectory. According to the chairman of the Israeli Space Agency, Arrow 3 may serve as an anti-satellite weapon, which would make Israel one of the world's few countries capable of shooting down satellites.

=== Arrow 4 ===
Israel's Defense Ministry and industry developers have begun early work on what could evolve into the Arrow 4, an endo-exo missile which can intercept hostile missiles both in and out of the atmosphere, a new missile-intercepting system to defend against much more sophisticated future threats. In 2017, Boaz Levy, IAI executive vice president, said it was probably too early to call the effort Arrow 4. Nevertheless, he acknowledged that ongoing design studies are aimed at a future interceptor that will extend capabilities beyond Arrow 2 and Arrow 3.

In early 2021, Israel revealed that the development of the Arrow 4 interceptor was ongoing and that the system was targeting the interception of hypersonic threats such as hypersonic cruise missiles and hypersonic glide vehicles. Efforts to counter hypersonic threats took on new urgency following a November 2022 announcement by Iran that they had tested a hypersonic missile which can reach Israel within four minutes.

== Specifications ==
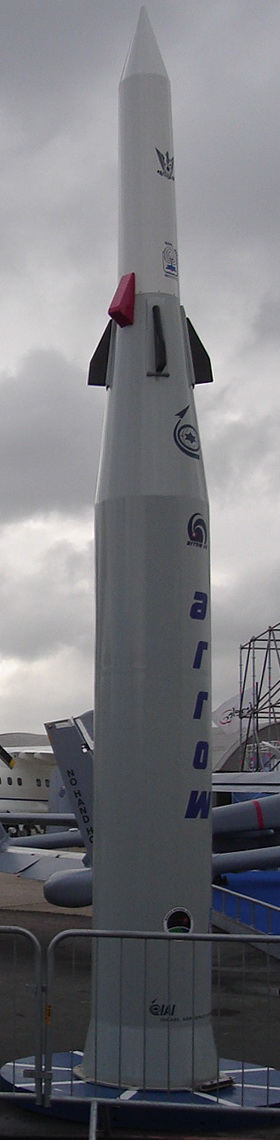
Arrow 2 at the Paris Air Show.

The Arrow system was originally designed and optimized to intercept short and medium-range ballistic missiles with ranges above 200 km (120 mi). It is not intended to intercept either military aircraft or artillery rockets, the second of which are relatively small and short ranged. In contrast to THAAD, RIM-161 Standard Missile 3, and MIM-104 Patriot PAC-3, that use kinetic, direct impact to destroy the target ("hit-to-kill") the Arrow 2 relies on explosive detonation. Arrow 2 can intercept its targets above the stratosphere, high enough so that any nuclear, chemical, or biological weapons do not scatter over Israel. The developers intended to perform the destruction sequence away from populated locations. According to Dr. Uzi Rubin, the missile was tested to determine whether chemical warfare agents would reach the ground should such a warhead be intercepted. The conclusion was that nothing would reach the ground if the warhead is destroyed above the jet stream, which flows from west to east and would therefore blow any chemical residue. (Note: Israel borders Jordan and the West Bank in the east, and Syria in the northeast.) Nevertheless, Arrow is also capable of low altitude interception, as well as multi-tactical ballistic missiles interception.

The two-stage missile is equipped with solid propellant booster and sustainer rocket motors. The missile uses an initial burn to carry out a vertical hot launch from the container and a secondary burn to sustain the missile's trajectory towards the target at a speed of Mach 9, or 2.5 km/s (1.6 mi/s). Thrust vector control is used in the boost and sustainer phases of flight. At the ignition of the second stage sustainer motor, the first stage assembly separates. The Arrow missile is launched before the threat missile's trajectory and intercept point are accurately known. As more trajectory data becomes available, the optimum intercept point is more precisely defined, towards which the missiles is then guided. The 500 kg (1,100 lb) kill vehicle section of the missile, containing the warhead, fusing and the terminal seeker, is equipped with four moving delta aerodynamic control fins to give low altitude interception capability. The dual mode missile seeker has a passive infrared seeker for the acquisition and tracking of tactical ballistic missiles and an active radar seeker used to home on air-breathing targets at low altitudes. The infrared seeker is an indium antimonide focal plane array. The kill vehicle is designed to achieve a hit-to-kill interception, but if this is not achieved, the proximity fuze will direct the warhead fragments at the target shortly before reaching the closest point to the target. The high explosive directed blast fragmentation warhead is capable of destroying a target within a 40–50 m (130–160 ft) radius. In this manner, Arrow also differs from Patriot PAC-3, THAAD, and Standard Missile 3, which rely purely on hit-to-kill technology in which the kinetic force of a precise impact causes the destruction of the threat.

According to Dov Raviv, a senior developer dubbed "the father of the Arrow anti-ballistic missile", (Note: As is Dr. Uzi Rubin: Dr. Uzi Rubin, "father" of Israel's Arrow Ballistic Missile Defense System, speaking, Jewish Institute for National Security Affairs Conference, archived from the original on January 5, 2009) a single Arrow interceptor has a 90 percent probability of destroying a target missile at the highest altitude possible. In case of failure two more interceptors can be launched towards the target at short time intervals. If the first of these destroys the target, the second can be directed to another target. Using this technique, three independent interception possibilities are provided which raise the interception probability from 90 percent to 99.9 percent, thus satisfying the leakage rate requirement. The Arrow can also simultaneously intercept a salvo of more than five incoming missiles, with the target missiles arriving within 30 seconds. Such capability is currently possessed only by the United States and Russia. According to Raviv, the Arrow can discriminate between a warhead and a decoy.

Each Arrow battery is equipped with typically four to eight erectors–launchers, its manning requires about 100 personnel. Each trailer-mounted erector–launcher weighs 35 tonnes (77,000 lb) when loaded with six launch tubes with ready-to-fire missiles. After firing the launchers can be reloaded in an hour. The system is transportable rather than mobile, as it can be moved to other prepared sites, but cannot be set up just anywhere.

Image of Arrow missile battery notional model.
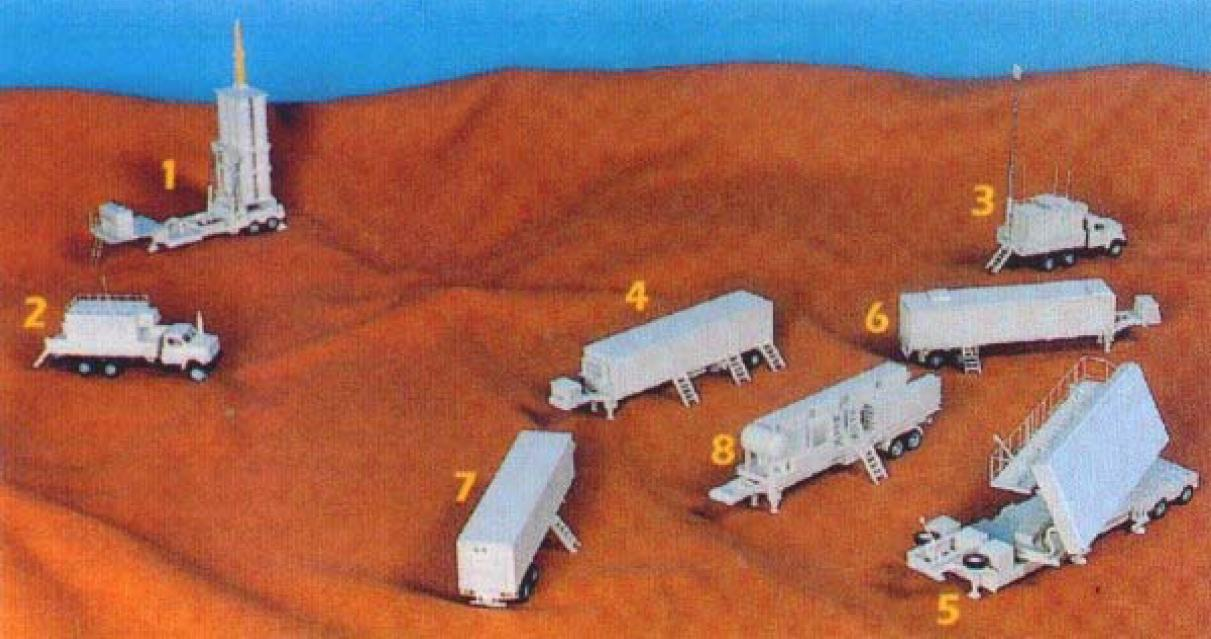
1. Single Arrow launcher (6 canisters). 2. "Golden Citron". 3. Communications center. 4. "Brown Hazelnut". 5. "Green Pine" radar antenna. 6. Radar control center. 7. Radar power unit. 8. Radar cooling unit.

=== Green Pine ===
"Super Green Pine" radar antenna.

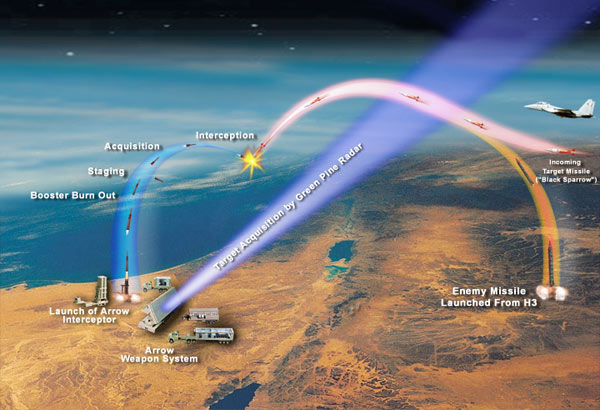
Stages of missile interception by the Arrow system. The picture shows a hostile missile trajectory and that of the "Black Sparrow" air-launched target missile used in firing tests.

The "Green Pine" is an active electronically scanned array (AESA) solid state radar operating at L band in the range 500 MHz to 1,000 MHz, or 1,000 MHz to 2,000 MHz. It operates in search, detection, tracking, and missile guidance modes simultaneously. It is capable of detecting targets at ranges of up to about 500 km (310 mi) and is able to track more than 30 targets at speeds over 3,000 m/s (10,000 ft/s). The radar illuminates the target and guides the Arrow missile to within 4 m (13 ft) of the target.

Super Green Pine

An advanced version of the radar, called "Super Green Pine", "Green Pine" Block-B, or "Great Pine" (Hebrew: אורן אדיר, pronounced [oʁen adiʁ]), is to take the place of the original "Green Pine. As of 2008 both versions were active. The "Super Green Pine" extends detection range to about 800–900 km (500–560 mi). An even more advanced upgrade of the Super Green Pine is under development.

=== Golden Citron ===
The "Golden Citron" (Hebrew: אתרוג זהב, pronounced [etʁoɡ zahav]) from Elbit Systems truck-mounted net-centric open systems architecture Battle Management Command, Control, Communication & Intelligence Center can control up to 14 intercepts simultaneously. As of 2007, it was one of the world's most advanced net-centric systems. The system provides fully automatic as well as Human-in-the-Loop options at every stage of battle operation management. It is also interoperable with other theater missile defense systems and C^{3}I systems. Notably Link 16, TADIL-J, communications were being altered to allow interoperability with Patriot fire control units. Assigned targets can be handed over to the Patriot's AN/MPQ-53 fire control radar. Tests carried out by the U.S. and Israel have successfully linked the Arrow with both U.S. and Israeli versions of the Patriot.

The "Citron Tree" has three banks of operator consoles laid out in a U shape. In the center sits the officer in command who oversees the engagement, but also has links to the other parts of the battery as well as to IAF headquarters. On the commander's right sits the engagement officer, who ensures that targets are assigned to other engagement officers sitting on the right-hand leg of the U. Each is assigned a geographical area to defend, and two of the officers are more senior as they have an overview of Patriot batteries. To the left of the commander is the resource officer, who monitors the status and readiness of the missiles. On the left of the U sits the sky picture officer, who is in contact with the Home Front Command and uses the center's ability to predict impact point to alert the civil authorities. Also at these consoles are an intelligence officer and an after-action/debrief officer, who uses recordings as it is impossible to absorb all the information during engagements. All in all, the "Golden Citron" is manned by 7–10 operators.

=== Brown Hazelnut ===
The "Brown Hazelnut" (Hebrew: אגוז חום, pronounced [eɡoz χum]) launch control center is located at the launch site, up to 300 km (190 mi) from the "Golden Citron" fire control center. It employs microwave and radio data and voice communications links to the "Green Pine" and "Golden Citron". The launch method is a vertical hot launch from a sealed canister, providing all-azimuth coverage. "Brown Hazelnut" also has missile maintenance and diagnostic capabilities.

== Production ==
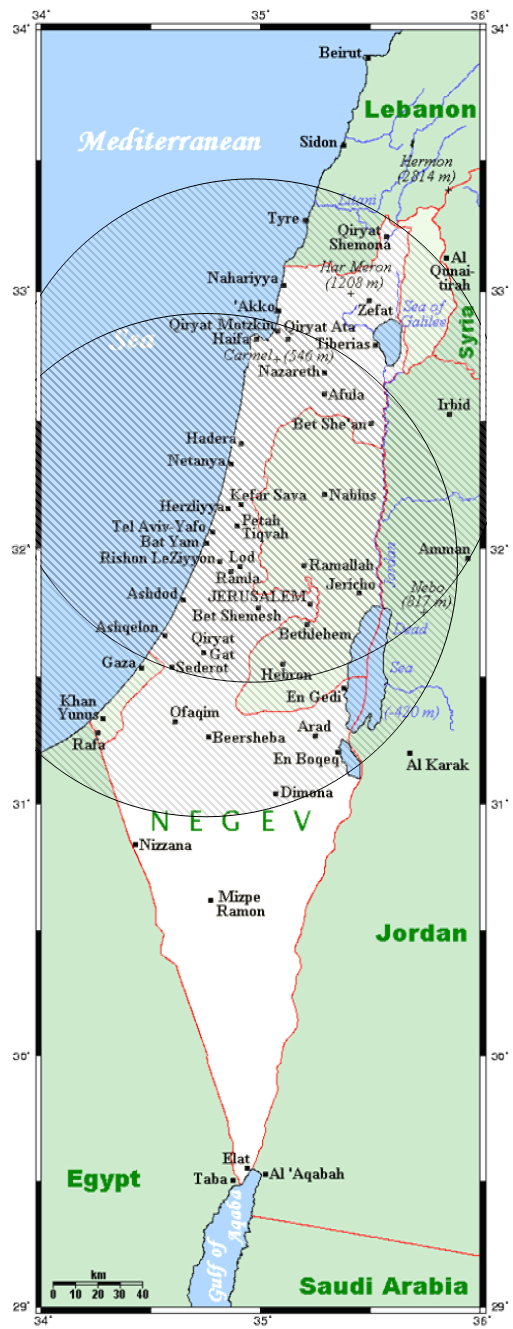
Coverage of Israel provided by two Arrow 2 batteries, derived from their published locations (Palmachim, Ein Shemer) and range (90–100 km).

Israel initially produced the Arrow system domestically, (Note: Except for Lockheed Martin's active radar seeker.) but on February 11, 2003, IAI and Boeing signed an agreement, valued at over $25 million for fiscal years 2003–2004, to establish production facilities for the manufacture of components for the Arrow missile in the United States. In March 2004, IAI awarded a $78 million production contract to Boeing; the total contract value could exceed $225 million through the second quarter of 2008. As a result of successful implementation of this contract Boeing is responsible for production of about 35 percent of Arrow missile components, including the electronics section, booster motor case and missile canister, at its Huntsville, Alabama, facilities. IAI, the prime contractor of the Arrow system, is responsible for integration and the final assembly of the Arrow missile in Israel. Boeing also coordinates the production of Arrow missile components manufactured by more than 150 American companies located in over 25 states. Boeing delivered its first Arrow 2 interceptor to Israel in 2005. Co-produced interceptors have been tested since February 12, 2007. Final deliveries to the Israel Air Force were planned by the end of 2010.

Other major contractors are:

- Elta – produces the "Green Pine" / "Super Green Pine" radar;
- Elisra – produces the "Golden Citron" C^{3}I Center;
- Rafael Advanced Defense Systems – produces the sustainer motor and the warhead;
- Israel Military Industries – produces the booster motor;
- Alliant Techsystems – produces the motor cases and the first stage nozzle;
- Lockheed Martin – produces the active radar seeker;
- Raytheon – produces the infrared seeker;
- Ceradyne – produces the ceramic radome.

== Deployment ==
According to its original 1986 schedule, the Arrow system was supposed to enter operational service in 1995. The first operational Arrow battery was deployed, however, in March 2000 in Palmachim Airbase, near the city of Rishon LeZion, south of the Tel Aviv metropolitan area. It was declared operational in October 2000 and reached its full capacity in March 2001. Deployment of the second battery at Ein Shemer Airfield, near the city of Hadera, Haifa District, northern Israel, was delayed by strong opposition from local residents who feared its radar would be hazardous to their health. The situation was eventually resolved, and Israel's second battery completed its deployment, turned operational, and linked up with the first battery in October 2002. In 2007, the IDF reportedly decided to modify its missile defense doctrine and to counter possible Syrian and Iranian missile barrages and has quietly modified its deployment of the Arrow in northern Israel.

The IDF planned to procure 50–100 interceptors for each battery. As of 1998, a battery was estimated to cost about $170 million. (Note: With four launchers.) As of 2012, reportedly one "Great Pine" radar is deployed alongside two "Green Pine" radars.

Israel had originally planned to deploy two Arrow 2 batteries but has since sought and won promises of funding for a third battery. Some reports stated that a third battery was already deployed, or in development in the south, while others claimed that a decision on deployment of a third battery has not yet been made, although it was under discussion for service entry in 2012. Another report stated that Israel planned to deploy not one, but two additional Arrow 2 batteries to defend the country's southern region, also covering sensitive sites such as the Negev Nuclear Research Center. However the decision about the third battery was taken in October 2010. The new battery was expected to be put into operational use in 2012 in the center of the country. According to Jane's Defence Weekly, some sources indicate that the new Arrow 2 battery became operational in 2012 in an Israeli Air Force facility at Tal Shahar, roughly halfway between Jerusalem and Ashdod, near Beit Shemesh.

=== Export ===
Apart from Israel, India had acquired and deployed three "Green Pine" radars by August 2005. The Indian government has sought to purchase the Arrow system since 1999, however in early 2002 the U.S. vetoed Israel's request to sell the Arrow 2 missiles to India, exercising its right as a major funding contributor. U.S. officials argued that the sale would violate the Missile Technology Control Regime (MTCR). Although the Arrow 2 could possibly achieve a range of 300 km (190 mi), it is designed for intercepts at shorter ranges, and it is unclear whether it could carry a 500 kg (1,100 lb) payload to this range specified in the MTCR. In 2011, once again, an Indian Army official said that the Arrow 2 might become part of India's missile defense solution. However, India would later go on to develop an indigenous BMD program in the early 2000s.

Turkey also planned to buy anti-missile air defense systems worth more than $1 billion. The Arrow was considered a potential contender, but was rejected on political grounds. In the past, the United Kingdom, Japan, and Singapore were mentioned as then potential foreign customers of the Arrow system. Netherlands reportedly expressed interest in the "Golden Citron" C^{3}I center in November 1999.

In the late 1990s, Jordanian officials expressed concern that any conflagration between Israel and Iraq or Iran would impact their territory. The problem becomes more difficult for Jordan when the warheads are not conventional. Therefore, Benjamin Netanyahu, during his first term of office as Prime Minister of Israel, reportedly offered Jordan "a defensive umbrella of Arrow 2". Without allowing Israel to forward deploy the Arrow launchers close to the Iraqi border, the other option is for Israel to sell Jordan the Arrow system. This is most likely what Prime Minister Netanyahu meant above. In May 1999, Israel reportedly requested U.S. approval for selling Arrow batteries to Jordan; however, no such approval has been given.

Armed with marketing approval by their respective governments, a U.S.–Israeli industrial team plans to offer the Arrow system to South Korea. The potential deal, estimated to exceed $1 billion.

For the United States, the Arrow has provided important technical and operational data. It remains a key element in the Missile Defense Agency's plan for a layered missile defense architecture, and an example of a successful, affordable program. At the moment, however, the United States does not have any plans to procure and deploy the Arrow. Nevertheless, in September 2009 the Arrow system was mentioned by then U.S. Secretary of Defense Robert Gates and then Vice Chairman of the Joint Chiefs of Staff General James Cartwright among the alternative to the proposed U.S. missile defense assets in Europe. The Arrow system is being incorporated into U.S. anti-ballistic capability in Europe, they said.

In a June 2011 interview, Lieutenant General Patrick J. O'Reilly said that Arrow 2 will be integrated into a regional defense array planned by the U.S. in the Middle East. According to the interview, it may also protect Arab countries that are allies of the U.S., but with which Israel has no diplomatic ties. By October 2015, the countries of the Gulf Cooperation Council (GCC) had become interested in procuring the Arrow system for themselves.

In the face of the Russian invasion of Ukraine, which began in February 2022, the German government is considering the purchase of the Arrow-3 system for the Bundeswehr. Since it is available on the market, it could be operational in Germany as early as 2025. For the missile protection shield, "Super Green Pine" missile radar systems would be installed at three locations in Germany, which would send their data to the Combined Air Operations Centre in Uedem. The German Arrow batteries could also cover Poland, Romania and/or the Baltic States. Neighbouring countries would then have to buy additional Arrow-3 missiles, whereas the radar image would be supplied by the German forces. According to a report in the newspaper "The Jerusalem Post" dated April 5, 2022, Israel and the United States have agreed in principle to sell the Arrow-3 system to Germany.

In June 2023, the German Bundestag approved the purchase of the Arrow 3 system for the German Air Force. The €4 billion deal was Israel's largest military export to date, with the first systems delivered in December 2025. In May 2025, the German government announced its intention to procure the Arrow 4 missile defense system, becoming the first international partner to signal acquisition plans for the system while it is still under development. Arrow 4 is being designed to intercept ballistic missiles in the upper atmosphere and exo-atmospherically, providing a strategic layer above the capabilities of Arrow 3. Germany plans to integrate Arrow 4 into the existing Arrow 3 infrastructure, including shared launchers and radar systems, to reduce procurement costs and streamline deployment. Initial deliveries are expected after 2030, contingent on development progress by Israel Aerospace Industries (IAI) and the U.S. Missile Defense Agency.

== Operational history ==
On March 17, 2017, the Arrow missile scored its first operational intercept when it shot down a Syrian S-200 missile fired at an Israeli aircraft. A senior IAF officer provided operational context to the unusual intercept of a surface-to-air missile. The officer said the S-200 missile "behaved like a ballistic threat" with "an altitude, range, and ballistic trajectory" that mimicked the Scud-class targets the Arrow 2 interceptor was designed to kill.

On October 31, 2023, an Arrow 2 missile intercepted a long-range ballistic missile launched at Israel from Houthis in Yemen. This was Arrow 2's first operational use during a war, and its first successful interception. On November 9, 2023, an Arrow 3 missile made its first successful interception of a Ghadr-110 missile heading for the country's southernmost city of Eilat.

On April 13, 2024, the Arrow missile defense system intercepted long-range ballistic missiles during Iran's Operation True Promise. Iran's attack included 120 ballistic missiles, 170 attack drones and 30 cruise missiles aimed at Israel. The successful interception of missiles by the Arrow system was part of a coordinated defense effort involving multiple other missile defense systems and international support from the U.S., Britain, and France which effectively prevented serious damage or casualties in Israel.

On October 1, 2024, the Arrow missile defense system intercepted long-range ballistic missiles during the October 2024 Iranian strikes against Israel. Iran's attack included 181 ballistic missiles deployed over two waves aimed at Israel.

On May 4, 2025, Israeli sources told the BBC that the Arrow missile defense system failed to intercept a missile fired from Yemen by Ansar Allah forces, which ended up impacting the ground near Ben Gurion Airport.

On June 18 2025, during the 2025 Iran–Israel war, The Wall Street Journal reported that, according to a US official, "Israel is running low on Arrow interceptors"

== See also ==
- European Sky Shield Initiative
- Terminal High Altitude Area Defense
- Aegis Ballistic Missile Defense System
- Taiwan Sky Bow Ballistic Missile Defense System
- Indian Ballistic Missile Defense Program
- Medium Extended Air Defense System
- S-300PMU
- S-300V
- S-300VM missile system
- S-400 missile system
- S-500 missile system
- Comparison of anti-ballistic missile systems

== Notes ==
=== References ===
https://www.janes.com/osint-insights/defence-news/weapons/idex-2025-iai-working-on-arrow-5-interceptor

=== Bibliography ===
- Cordesman, Anthony H.; Nerguizian, Aram; Popescu, Ionut C. (2008). Israel and Syria: the military balance and prospects of war. Greenwood. ISBN 978-0-313-35520-2.
- Bar-Joseph, Uri (2001). Israel's national security towards the 21st Century. Frank Cass Publishers. ISBN 0-7146-5169-9.
- Naveh, Ben-Zion; Lorber, Azriel (2001). Theater ballistic missile defense. American Institute of Aeronautics and Astronautics. ISBN 1-56347-385-2.
- Stav, Arieh (2004). The threat of ballistic missiles in the Middle East: active defense and countermeasures. Sussex Academic Press. ISBN 1-84519-001-7.
