= List of ships of the Israeli Navy =

The following is a list of vessels that have served in the Israeli Navy since 1948.

"INS" stands for "Israeli Navy Ship".

== Missile corvettes ==
Class	Ship name	Meaning	History	Fate	Status
Reshef-class corvettes (Israel)	INS (??)				Planned
Reshef-class corvettes (Israel)	INS (??)				Planned
Reshef-class corvettes (Israel)	INS (??)				Planned
Reshef-class corvettes (Israel)	INS (??)				Planned
Reshef-class corvettes (Israel)	INS (??)				Planned
Sa'ar 6-class corvettes (German-Israeli design, built in Germany)	INS Magen	Shield or Defender	Launched on May 23, 2019. Taken delivery in 2020.		Active
Sa'ar 6-class corvettes (German-Israeli design, built in Germany)	INS Oz	Courage	Launched on August 24, 2019. Taken delivery in 2021.		Active
Sa'ar 6-class corvettes (German-Israeli design, built in Germany)	INS Atzmaut	Independence	Launched in 2019. Taken delivery in 2021.		Active
Sa'ar 6-class corvettes (German-Israeli design, built in Germany)	INS Nitzachon	Victory	Launched in 2019. Taken delivery in 2021.		Active
Sa'ar 5-class corvettes (Israeli design, built in United States)	INS Eilat (501)	Eilat	Launched on February 9, 1993. Commissioned on May 24, 1994.		Active
Sa'ar 5-class corvettes (Israeli design, built in United States)	INS Lahav (502)	Blade	Launched on August 20, 1993. Commissioned on September 23, 1994.		Active
Sa'ar 5-class corvettes (Israeli design, built in United States)	INS Hanit (503)	Spear	Launched on March 4, 1994. Commissioned on February 7, 1995.	Damaged by a C-802 ASM fired by Hezbollah during the 2006 Lebanon War. Repaired.	Active

== Missile boats ==
Class	Ship name	Meaning	History	Fate	Status
Sa'ar 4.5-class missile boats Hetz-subclass (Israel)	INS Romach	Lance	Launched and commissioned in October 1981.	Modernized in the early 1990s to match some up-to-date specifications of the Hetz-subclass.	Active
Sa'ar 4.5-class missile boats Hetz-subclass (Israel)	INS Keshet	Bow	Launched in October 1982. Commissioned in November 1982.	Modernized in the early 1990s to match some up-to-date specifications of the Hetz-subclass. Retired October 2026	Retired
Sa'ar 4.5-class missile boats Hetz-subclass (Israel)	INS Hetz	Arrow	Keel laid in 1984, launched in October 1990, commissioned in February 1991.		Active
Sa'ar 4.5-class missile boats Hetz-subclass (Israel)	INS Kidon	Javelin	Commissioned in February 1994, comprising various systems dismantled from older Sa'ar 4 INS Kidon hull.		Active
Sa'ar 4.5-class missile boats Hetz-subclass (Israel)	INS Tarshish	Tarshish	Commissioned in June 1995, comprising some systems dismantled from older Sa'ar 4 INS Tarshish hull.		Active
Sa'ar 4.5-class missile boats Hetz-subclass (Israel)	INS Yaffo	Jaffa	Commissioned in July 1998, comprising various systems dismantled from older Sa'ar 4 INS Yaffo hull.		Active
Sa'ar 4.5-class missile boats Hetz-subclass (Israel)	INS Herev	Sword	Commissioned in July 2002, comprising modern equipment and weapon systems.		Active
Sa'ar 4.5-class missile boats Hetz-subclass (Israel)	INS Sufa	Storm	Commissioned in May 2003, comprising modern equipment and weapon systems.		Active
Sa'ar 4.5-class missile boats Aliya-subclass (Israel)	INS Aliya	Aliyah	Launched in July 1980. Commissioned in August 1980.	Sold to Mexico in 2004 as ARM Huracán.	Sold
Sa'ar 4.5-class missile boats Aliya-subclass (Israel)	INS Geula	Salvation	Launched in October 1980. Commissioned in December 1980.	Sold to Mexico in 2004 as ARM Tormenta.	Sold
Sa'ar 4-class missile boats (Israel)	INS Reshef	Flash	Launched in 1973. Commissioned in February 1973.	Sold to Chile in 1997 as LM-34 Angamos.	Sold
Sa'ar 4-class missile boats (Israel)	INS Keshet	Bow	Launched in 1973. Commissioned before October 1973.	Sold to Chile in 1981 as LM-31 Chipana.	Sold
Sa'ar 4-class missile boats (Israel)	INS Romach	Lance	Launched in 1974.	Sold to Chile in 1979 as LM-30 Casma.	Sold
Sa'ar 4-class missile boats (Israel)	INS Kidon	Javelin	Launched in 1974.	Disassembled. Various systems reassembled atop Sa'ar 4.5 hull in 1994. The old hull sunk as an underwater memorial.	Retired
Sa'ar 4-class missile boats (Israel)	INS Tarshish	Tarshish	Launched in 1975.	Disassembled. Some systems reassembled atop Sa'ar 4.5 hull in 1995. The old hull sold to Chile in 1997 as LM-35 Papudo.	Sold
Sa'ar 4-class missile boats (Israel)	INS Yaffo	Jaffa	Launched in 1975.	Disassembled. Various systems reassembled atop new Sa'ar 4.5-class missile boat hull in 1998.	Retired
Sa'ar 4-class missile boats (Israel)	INS Nitzachon	Victory	Launched in July 1978. Commissioned in September 1978.	Retired in 2014.	Retired
Sa'ar 4-class missile boats (Israel)	INS Atzmaut	Independence	Launched in December 1978. Commissioned in February 1979.	Retired in 2014. Used as a practice target for Harpoon missiles.	Retired
Sa'ar 4-class missile boats (Israel)	INS Moledet	Homeland	Launched in 1979.	Sold to Sri Lanka in 2000 as SLNS Suranimala.	Sold
Sa'ar 4-class missile boats (Israel)	INS Komemiyut	Rebellion	Launched in 1980.	Sold to Sri Lanka in 2000 as SLNS Nandimitra.	Sold
Sa'ar 3-class missile boats (German-Israeli design, built in France)	INS Sa'ar (331)	Tempest	Launched in 1969. Commissioned in 1970.		Retired
Sa'ar 3-class missile boats (German-Israeli design, built in France)	INS Sufa (332)	Storm	Launched in 1969. Commissioned in 1970.		Retired
Sa'ar 3-class missile boats (German-Israeli design, built in France)	INS Ga'ash (333)	Volcano	Launched in 1969. Commissioned in 1970.	In 1981 accidentally beached in Saudi Arabia. Repaired.	Retired
Sa'ar 3-class missile boats (German-Israeli design, built in France)	INS Herev (341)	Sword	Launched in 1969. Commissioned in 1970.		Retired
Sa'ar 3-class missile boats (German-Israeli design, built in France)	INS Hanit (342)	Spear	Launched in 1969. Commissioned in 1970.	Sold to Chile in 1988 as LM-32 Iquique	Sold
Sa'ar 3-class missile boats (German-Israeli design, built in France)	INS Hetz (343)	Arrow	Launched in 1969. Commissioned in 1970.	Sold to Chile in 1988 as LM-33 Covadonga	Sold
Sa'ar 2-class missile boats (German-Israeli design, built in France)	INS Mivtach (311)	Reliance	Converted from Sa'ar 1-class patrol boat in 1974.	Set in the Clandestine Immigration and Naval Museum.	Retired
Sa'ar 2-class missile boats (German-Israeli design, built in France)	INS Miznak (312)	Spring	Converted from Sa'ar 1-class patrol boat in 1974.		Retired
Sa'ar 2-class missile boats (German-Israeli design, built in France)	INS Misgav (313)	Stronghold	Converted from Sa'ar 1-class patrol boat in 1974.		Retired
Sa'ar 2-class missile boats (German-Israeli design, built in France)	INS Eilat (321)	Eilat	Commissioned in 1969.		Retired
Sa'ar 2-class missile boats (German-Israeli design, built in France)	INS Haifa (322)	Haifa	Commissioned in 1969.		Retired
Sa'ar 2-class missile boats (German-Israeli design, built in France)	INS Akko (323)	Akko	Commissioned in 1969.		Retired

== Submarines ==
Class	Ship name	Meaning	History	Fate	Status
Dakar-class submarines (German-Israeli design, to be built in Germany)	INS Dakar	Dakar			Planned
Dakar-class submarines (German-Israeli design, to be built in Germany)	INS (??)				Planned
Dakar-class submarines (German-Israeli design, to be built in Germany)	INS (??)				Planned
Dolphin-class (Batch-II) submarines (German-Israeli design, built in Germany)	INS Tanin	Tannin/Crocodile	Launched in February 2012. Commissioned on September 23, 2014.		Active
Dolphin-class (Batch-II) submarines (German-Israeli design, built in Germany)	INS Rahav	Rahab	Launched in April 2013. Commissioned on January 12, 2016.		Active
Dolphin-class (Batch-II) submarines (German-Israeli design, built in Germany)	INS Drakon	Dragon	Launched in August 2023; handed over to the Israeli Navy in July 2026		In delivery as of August 2026
Dolphin-class (Batch-I) submarines (German-Israeli design, built in Germany)	INS Dolphin	Dolphin	Launched on April 12, 1996. Commissioned on July 30, 1999.		Active
Dolphin-class (Batch-I) submarines (German-Israeli design, built in Germany)	INS Leviathan	Leviathan	Launched on April 25, 1997. Commissioned on November 15, 1999.		Active
Dolphin-class (Batch-I) submarines (German-Israeli design, built in Germany)	INS Tkuma	Revival	Launched on June 26, 1998. Commissioned on July 25, 2000.		Active
Gal-class submarines (German-Israeli design, built in UK)	INS Gal	Wave	Launched in December 1975. Commissioned in December 1976.	Set in the Clandestine Immigration and Naval Museum.	Retired
Gal-class submarines (German-Israeli design, built in UK)	INS Tanin	Tannin/Crocodile	Launched in October 1975. Commissioned in July 1977.	Retired in early or mid 2000s.	Retired
Gal-class submarines (German-Israeli design, built in UK)	INS Rahav	Rahab	Launched in 1977. Commissioned in December 1977.	Retired in early or mid 2000s.	Retired
T-class submarines (United Kingdom)	INS Leviatan (Tz-75)	Leviathan	Formerly HMS Turpin (P354). Purchased from UK in 1965. Commissioned in 1967.	Retired before 1978.	Retired
T-class submarines (United Kingdom)	INS Dakar (Tz-77)	Grouper	Formerly HMS Totem (P352). Purchased from UK in 1966.	Lost in sea in January 1968, before official commissioning. Wreckage found in May 1999.	Sunk
T-class submarines (United Kingdom)	INS Dolphin (Tz-79)	Dolphin	Formerly HMS Truncheon (P353). Purchased from UK in 1967. Commissioned in 1968.	Retired before 1977.	Retired
S-class submarines (United Kingdom)	INS Tanin (Tz-71)	Tannin/Crocodile	Formerly HMS Springer (P264). Purchased from UK in 1958. Commissioned in December 1959.	Retired before 1972.	Retired
S-class submarines (United Kingdom)	INS Rahav (Tz-73)	Rahab	Formerly HMS Sanguine (P266). Purchased from UK in 1958. Commissioned in May 1960.	Retired in 1968 and cannibalized for spare parts for INS Tanin.	Retired

== Support ships ==
Class	Ship name	Meaning	History	Fate	Status
Stollergrund-class utility ships (Germany)	INS Bat Yam	Bat Yam	Formerly Kalkgrund (Y865)		Active
Stollergrund-class utility ships (Germany)	INS Bat Galim 3	Bat Galim	Formerly Bant (Y867)	Passed as a research vessel to Israel's Oceanographic and Limnological Research Institution	Sold
General Frank S. Besson (United States)	INS Nahshon	Pioneer	Launched in 2024		Active
General Frank S. Besson (United States)	INS Komemiyut	Rebellion	Launched in 2024		Active

== WW2 gunships ==
Class	Ship name	Meaning	History	Fate	Status
Icebreaker (United States)	INS Eilat (A-16) and later INS Matzpen	Eilat Compass	Formerly USCGC Northland (WPG-49). Commissioned on May 21, 1948, becoming the first warship of the Israeli Sea Corps.	Served mainly for training, with limited combat capability. Renamed to INS Matzpen in 1957. Retired in 1962.	Retired
Flower-class corvettes (United Kingdom)	INS HaShomer and also INS Wedgwood (K-18)	Named after Josiah Wedgwood	Formerly HMCS Beauharnois (K540). Commissioned on 9 June 1948.	Retired in 1954	Retired
Flower-class corvettes (United Kingdom)	INS Haganah (K-20)	Haganah	Formerly HMCS Norsyd (K520). Commissioned on 18 July 1948.	Retired in the late 1950s	Retired
Revenue cutter (United States)	INS Hatikvah (K-22)	Hatikvah	Formerly USCGC Gresham (WPG-85). Launched in 1896. Acquired in 1948.	Retired in 1951	Retired
Converted patrol yacht (Germany, United States)	INS Maoz (K-24)	Stronghold	Formerly USS Cythera (PY-31) and Vita; Launched in 1931. Acquired in 1948.	Retired in 1956	Retired
PC-461-class submarine chaser (United States)	INS Nogah (K-26)	Venus	Formerly USS PC-1265 and ASPC Yucatán. Commissioned in October 1948.	Retired in 1952	Retired
PC-461-class submarine chaser (United States)	INS Nogah 2 (K-22)	Venus	Formerly USS PC-1188. Arrived in 1953.	Retired in late 1960s	Retired
River-class frigates (United Kingdom)	INS Mivtach (K-28)	Reliance	Formerly HMCS Orkney (K448). Purchased from Canada and commissioned in 1949.	Sold to Ceylon as HMCyS Mahasena.	Sold
River-class frigates (United Kingdom)	INS Misgav (K-30)	Stronghold	Formerly HMCS Strathadam (K682). Purchased from Canada and commissioned in 1950.	Retired in the late 1960s. Expended in 1970, used as a target in Gabriel missile trials.	Retired
River-class frigates (United Kingdom)	INS Miznak (K-32)	Jet branch	Formerly HMCS Hallowell (K666). Purchased from Canada in 1950. Commissioned in 1952.	Sold to Ceylon in 1958 as HMCyS Gajabahu.	Sold
Hunt-class destroyer (United Kingdom)	INS Haifa (K-38)	Haifa	Formerly HMS Mendip (L60). Captured from Egypt on 31 October 1956. Commissioned in 1957.	Expended in 1968, used as a target in Gabriel missile trials.	Retired
Z-class destroyers (United Kingdom)	INS Eilat (K-40)	Eilat	Formerly HMS Zealous (R39). Purchased from UK in 1955. Commissioned in July 1956.	Sunk by SS-N-2 Styx missiles fired from Egyptian missile boats, on 21 October 1967.	Sunk
Z-class destroyers (United Kingdom)	INS Yaffo (K-42)	Jaffa	Formerly HMS Zodiac (R54). Purchased from UK in 1955. Commissioned in July 1956.	Expended in 1970, used as a target in Gabriel missile trials.	Retired

== WW2 gunboats ==
Class	Ship name	Meaning	History	Fate	Status
Fairmile B motor launch (United Kingdom)	INS HaPortzim (M-17)	The Breachers	Purchased from British mandate government. Commissioned in July 1948.	Retired	Retired
Yacht (United Kingdom)	INS Palmach (M-19)	Palmach	Former HMS Moretta. Purchased from British mandate government. Commissioned in July 1948.	Sunk during a storm near the port of Yaffo.	Sunk
Harbour Defence Motor Launch (United Kingdom)	INS Dror (M-21)	Freedom	Purchased from British mandate government. Commissioned in July 1948.	Retired	Retired
Harbour Defence Motor Launch (United Kingdom)	INS Sa'ar (M-23)	Tempest	Purchased from British mandate government. Commissioned in July 1948.	Retired	Retired
Harbour Defence Motor Launch (United Kingdom)	INS Tirtza (M-35)		Purchased from Cyprus. Commissioned in August 1948.	Retired	Retired
R boat (Germany)	INS Galia (M-31)		Former German patrol boat, purchased from Italy. Commissioned in August 1948.	Retired	Retired

== Patrol boats ==
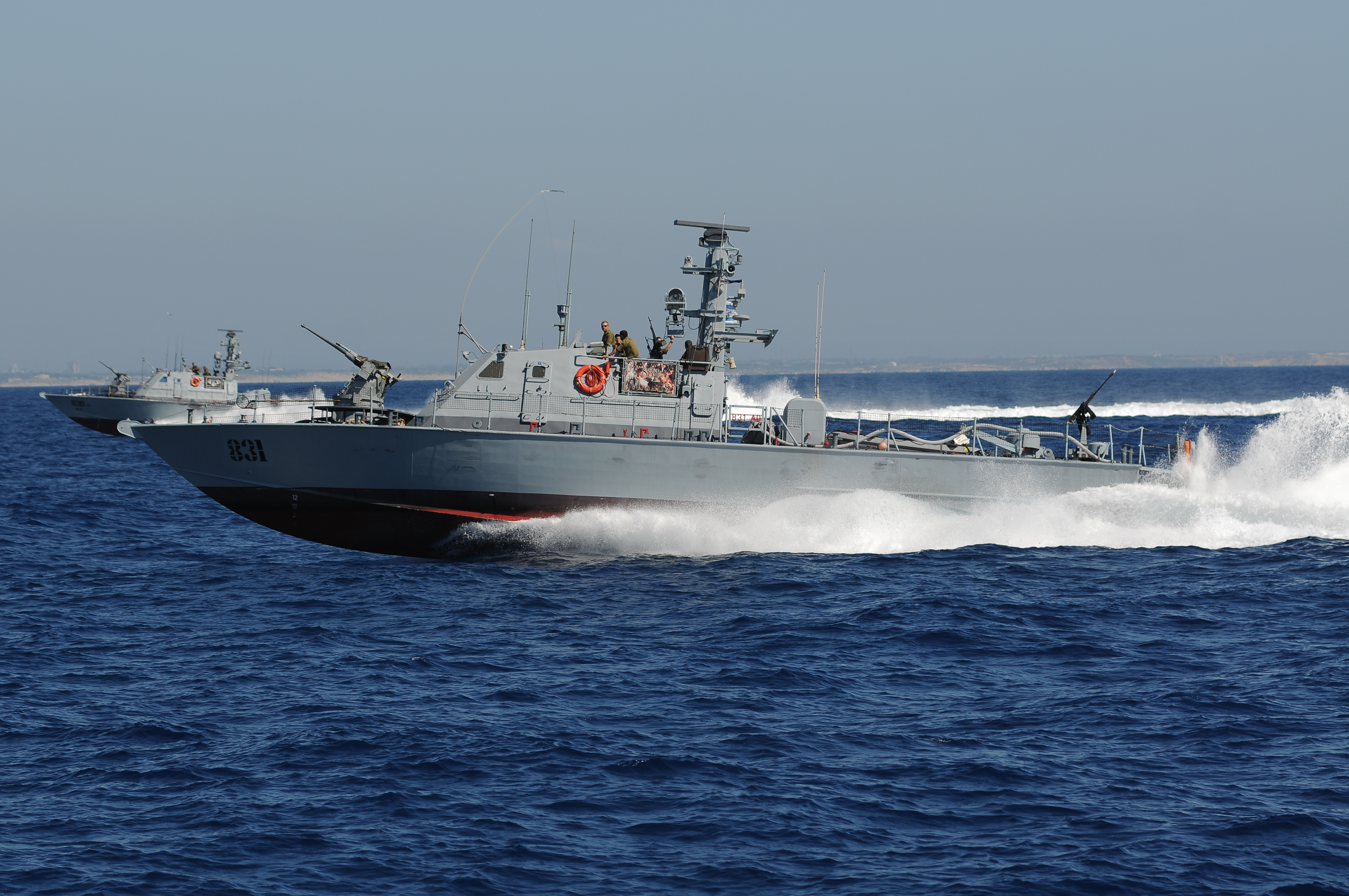
Shaldag class fast patrol boat

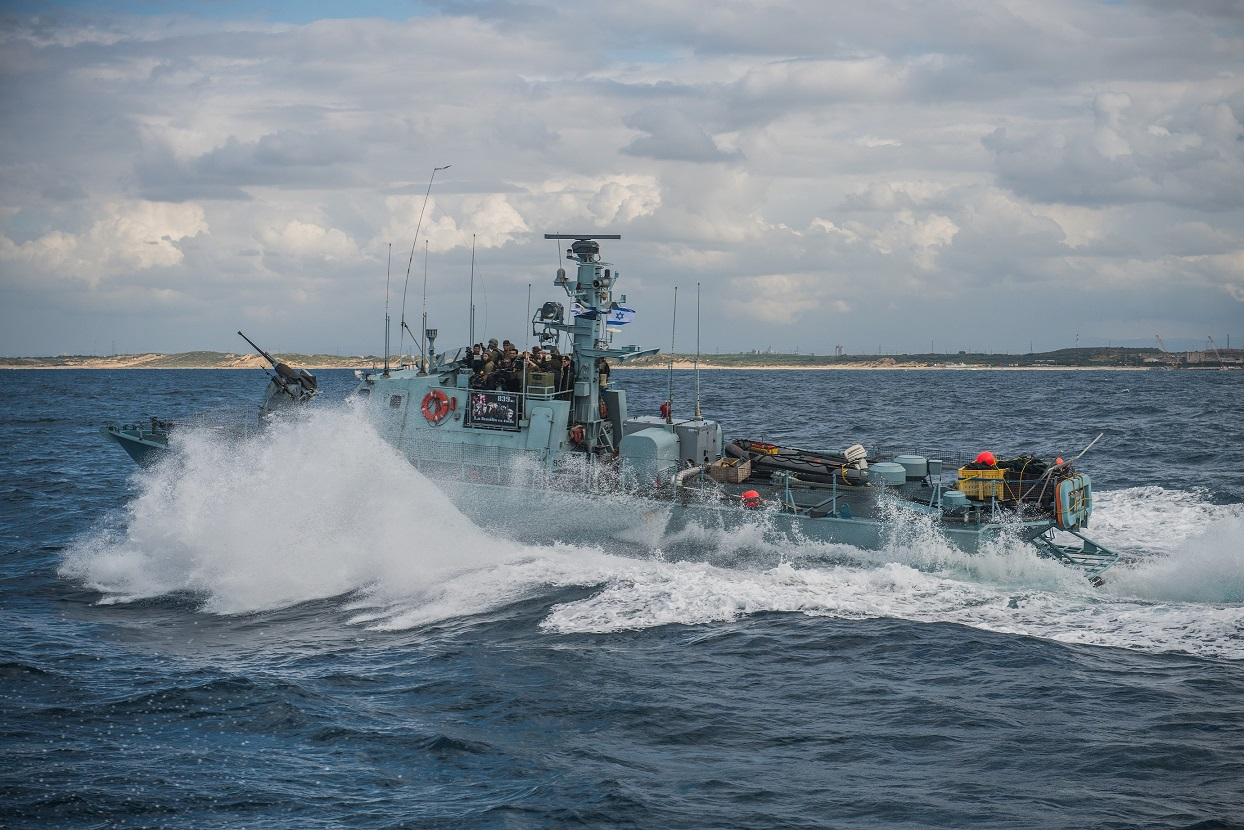
Dvora class fast patrol boat

- Netz-class boats – Retired
- Yatush-class patrol boats – Retired
- Bertram-class patrol boats – Retired
- Saar 1-class boats – based on German Jaguar-class fast attack craft, built in France
  - INS Mivtach (311) – Converted to Saar 2 class missile boat
  - INS Miznak (312) – Converted to Saar 2 class missile boat
  - INS Misgav (313) – Converted to Saar 2 class missile boat
- Dabur-class patrol boats – 12 built by Sewart Seacraft, the rest by IAI-Ramta – 34 adopted in 1973–77, decommissioned)
- Super Dvora-class fast patrol boats – built by IAI-Ramta
  - Dvora Mk I - 9 adopted from 1988, 9 active
  - Super Dvora Mk II - 4 adopted from 1996, 2 active
  - Super Dvora Mk III - 7 active
- Shaldag-class fast patrol boats
  - Shaldag Mk I - 5 active
  - Shaldag Mk II - 2 active
- Tzir'ah-class patrol boats – 3 active

== Hydrofoils ==
- Grumman M161 hydrofoil
  - INS Shimrit (Built by Grumman)
  - INS Shlomit (Built in Israel) Sold for scrap in September 1991.

== Landing ships ==
- P-25, P-33 – built in Germany
  - Purchased in Italy
  - Commissioned in 1948
  - Retired in 1957
- P-31
  - Purchased in Italy
  - Commissioned in August 1948
  - Retired after a brief service
- LCT class
  - INS Gush Etsion / Prato (P-39)
    - Purchased in Italy
    - Commissioned in July 1948
    - Retired in 1957
- LCI class
  - INS Ramat Rachel (P-51), INS Nitsanim (P-53)
    - Commissioned in December 1948 / January 1949
    - Retired in late 1950s
- INS Bat-Sheva (P-57)
  - Purchased in 1968-69
  - Retired in the 1990s, sunk during a missile trials
- LSM-1 class
  - INS Sheva (P-91), INS Ofir (P-93), INS Tarshish (P-95)
    - Purchased in 1970
    - Retired in 1973-74
- Kishon class landing ships – built in Israel
  - INS Etzion Gever (P-51), INS Shikmona (P-53), INS Caesarea (P-55)
    - Retired by 1991
- Ashdod class landing ships – built in Israel in 1966-67
  - INS Ashdod (P-61)
    - Retired in 2001
  - INS Ashkelon (P-63), INS Achziv (P-65)
    - Retired in 1999
- INS Nahshon, INS Komemiyut
  - Commissioned in 2024
  - Active

== Commando boats ==
- Dolphin type underwater craft
- Maiale (pig) type underwater craft
- Snunit boats
- Zaharon boats
- Moulit boats
- Morena rigid-hulled inflatable boats
