= INS Kidon =

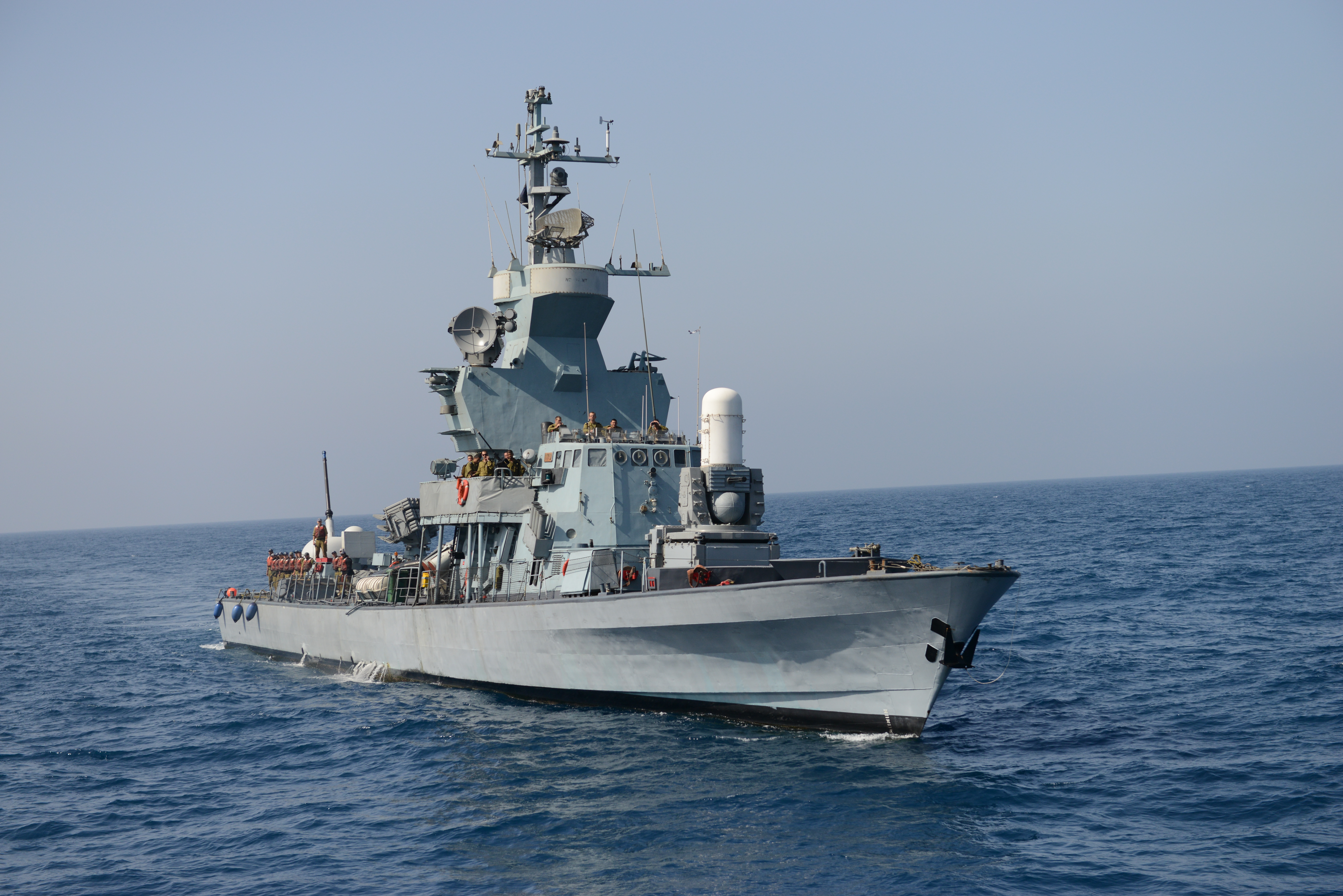
- INS Kidon underway, 2012

History

Israel
- Name: Kidon
- Namesake: Javelin
- Builder: Israel Shipyards Ltd.
- Commissioned: 1997
- Status: Active
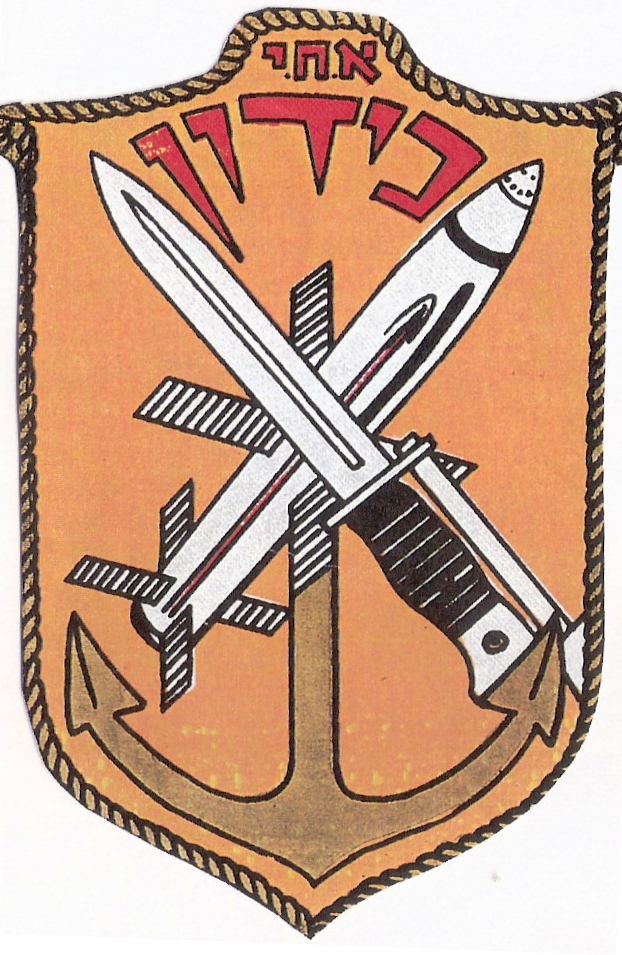
- Badge

General characteristics
- Class & type: Sa'ar 4.5-class missile boat
- Displacement: 488 tonnes (full load); 430 tonnes (standard)
- Length: 61.7 m (202 ft 5 in)
- Beam: 7.62 m (25 ft 0 in)
- Draft: 2.8 m (9 ft 2 in)
- Propulsion: 4 MTU 16V 396 TB91 diesel engines, four shafts, total of 16,000 shp (12,000 kW)
- Speed: 34 knots (63 km/h)
- Range: 4,800 nautical miles (8,900 km) at 19 knots (35 km/h) 2,200 nautical miles (4,100 km) at 30 knots (56 km/h)
- Boats & landing craft carried: 1 Rigid hull inflatable boat
- Complement: 53 officers and crewmen
- Sensors & processing systems: Elta EL/M-2218S air search radar; Elta EL/M-2221 fire-control radar
- Electronic warfare & decoys: Elbit chaff rocket launchers; Rafael RF corner reflector; Elisra NS-9003A/9005 RWR
- Armament: 8 x RGM-84 Harpoon anti-ship missiles; 16 x Barak 1 surface-to-air missiles; 1 x OTO Melara 76 mm naval gun; 2 x 0.5 in (12.70 mm) caliber M2 Browning machine guns; 3 x 7.62 mm FN MAG 58 general-purpose machine guns; 1 x 20 mm Phalanx CIWS

INS Kidon (Hebrew: אח"י כידון, lit. Javelin) is a Sa'ar 4.5-class missile boat of the Israeli Navy's Shayetet 3 Flotilla, built by Israel Shipyards Ltd. and commissioned in 1997.

The ship is not the first to use this name, named after the previous Sa'ar 4-class missile boat. The newer ship comprising various systems dismantled from older Sa'ar 4 INS Kidon hull.

== See also ==
- INS Herev
- INS Tarshish
