= Sa'ar 4.5-class missile boat =

Israeli missile boat

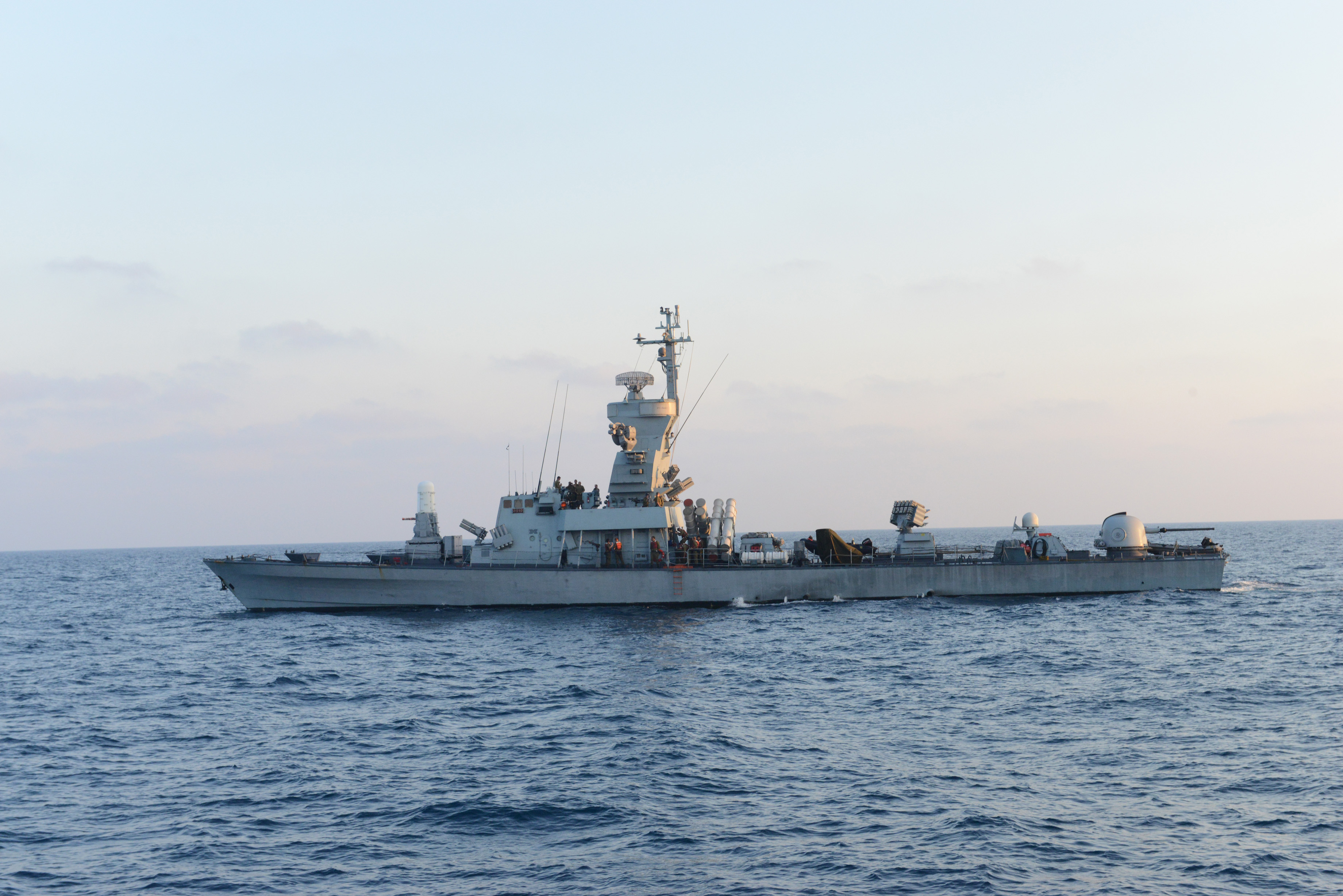
- INS Sufa in operation Protective Edge

Class overview
- Name: Sa'ar 4.5
- Builders: Israel Shipyards Ltd.
- Operators: Israeli Navy; Hellenic Coast Guard; Mexican Navy
- Preceded by: Sa'ar 4-class missile boat
- Succeeded by: Sa'ar 5-class corvette
- Subclasses: Aliya (Chochit); Hetz (Nirit)
- Completed: 2 Aliya subclass; 8 Hetz subclass
- Active: · Aliya subclass: INS Aliya, INS Geula; · Hetz subclass: INS Romach, INS Keshet, INS Hetz, INS Tarshish, INS Kidon, INS Yaffo, INS Herev, and INS Sufa

General characteristics
- Type: Missile boat
- Displacement: 498 tonnes (full load - Aliya subclass); 488 tonnes (full load - Hetz subclass); 430 tonnes (common standard)
- Length: 61.7 m (202 ft 5 in)
- Beam: 7.62 m (25 ft 0 in)
- Draft: 2.8 m (9 ft 2 in)
- Propulsion: 4 MTU 16V956 TB91 V16 diesel engines; 4,000 hp (3,000 kW) each
- Speed: 19 knots (35 km/h; 22 mph) (cruise speed); 33 knots (61 km/h; 38 mph) (top speed - Aliya); 34 knots (63 km/h; 39 mph) (top speed - Hetz)
- Range: 4,800 nautical miles (8,900 km) at 19 knots (35 km/h; 22 mph); 2,200 nautical miles (4,100 km) at 30 knots (56 km/h; 35 mph)
- Complement: 53 officers and crewmen
- Sensors & processing systems: Thales Neptune air & surface search radar; Selenia Orion fire-control radar (Aliya); EL/M-2258 ALPHA multifunction radar (Hetz); Elta EL/M-2221 fire-control radar (Hetz)
- Electronic warfare & decoys: Elbit chaff rocket launchers; Elisra NS-9003A/9005 RWR
- Armament: Aliya subclass: 4 Harpoon anti-ship missiles (in ISC); 4 Gabriel anti-ship missiles; 2 Oerlikon 20 mm cannons; Phalanx CIWS; 4 M2 Browning machine guns; Hetz subclass: 8 Harpoon anti-ship missiles; up to 6 Gabriel anti-ship missiles; or; up to 32 Barak 1 surface-to-air missiles; Otobreda 76 mm / Typhoon 25 mm naval gun; 2 Oerlikon 20mm cannon; Phalanx CIWS; up to 8 M2 Browning machine guns
- Aircraft carried: Eurocopter Panther in Aliya subclass (in ISC) or other helicopters
- Aviation facilities: Helipad and helicopter hangar in Aliya subclass

The Sa'ar 4.5-class missile boats (Hebrew: סער 4.5) is a class of Israeli Sea Corps missile boats designed and built by Israel Shipyards Ltd. for Shayetet 3 flotilla as an improved and stretched Sa'ar 4-class missile boat. There are two different subclasses that are both named Sa'ar 4.5. The first subclass was initially called Chochit (Hebrew: חוחית), but renamed to Aliya (Hebrew: עליה). Two Aliya-subclass boats are in service with the Mexican Navy. The second subclass was initially called Nirit (Hebrew: נירית) but renamed to Hetz (Hebrew: חץ).

== History ==
The original construction plan for Sa'ar 4.5-class missile boats included:

Two helicopter-equipped boats (Aliya subclass):

- INS Aliya
- INS Geula

Three ordinary missile boats (Hetz subclass):

- INS Romach (launched and commissioned in 1981),
- INS Keshet (launched and commissioned in 1982) and
- INS Nirit

The keel of INS Nirit was laid in 1984 but the construction ceased due to lack of funds and it was finally launched in 1990 and commissioned in 1991 with some modern equipment, eventuality renamed to INS Hetz. Consequently the older INS Romach and INS Keshet were upgraded to match INS Hetz's specifications.

INS Kidon, INS Tarshish, and INS Yaffo' commissioned in 1997, 1997, and 1998 respectively. Particularly INS Kidon and INS Yaffo were built comprising various older systems that were disassembled from Sa'ar 4-class boats with the same names, atop brand new Sa'ar 4.5-class hulls. INS Tarshish possibly also comprised some weapon systems dismounted from the Sa'ar 4-class missile boat with the same name, atop a new Sa'ar 4.5-class hull.

Another two further-upgraded Sa'ar 4.5 Hetz-subclass missile boats called INS Herev and INS Sufa were commissioned in 2002 and 2003, raising the number of Sa'ar 4.5 Hetz-subclass missile boats to eight.

== Subclasses ==
=== Aliya subclass ===
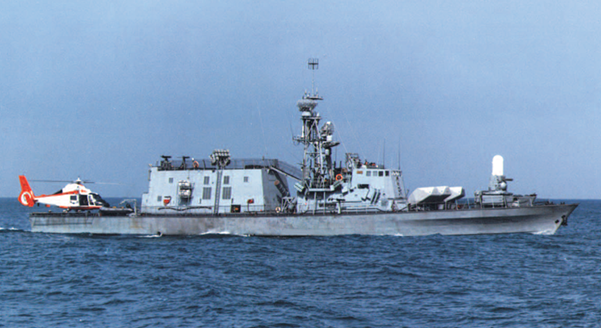
INS Aliya in 1985.

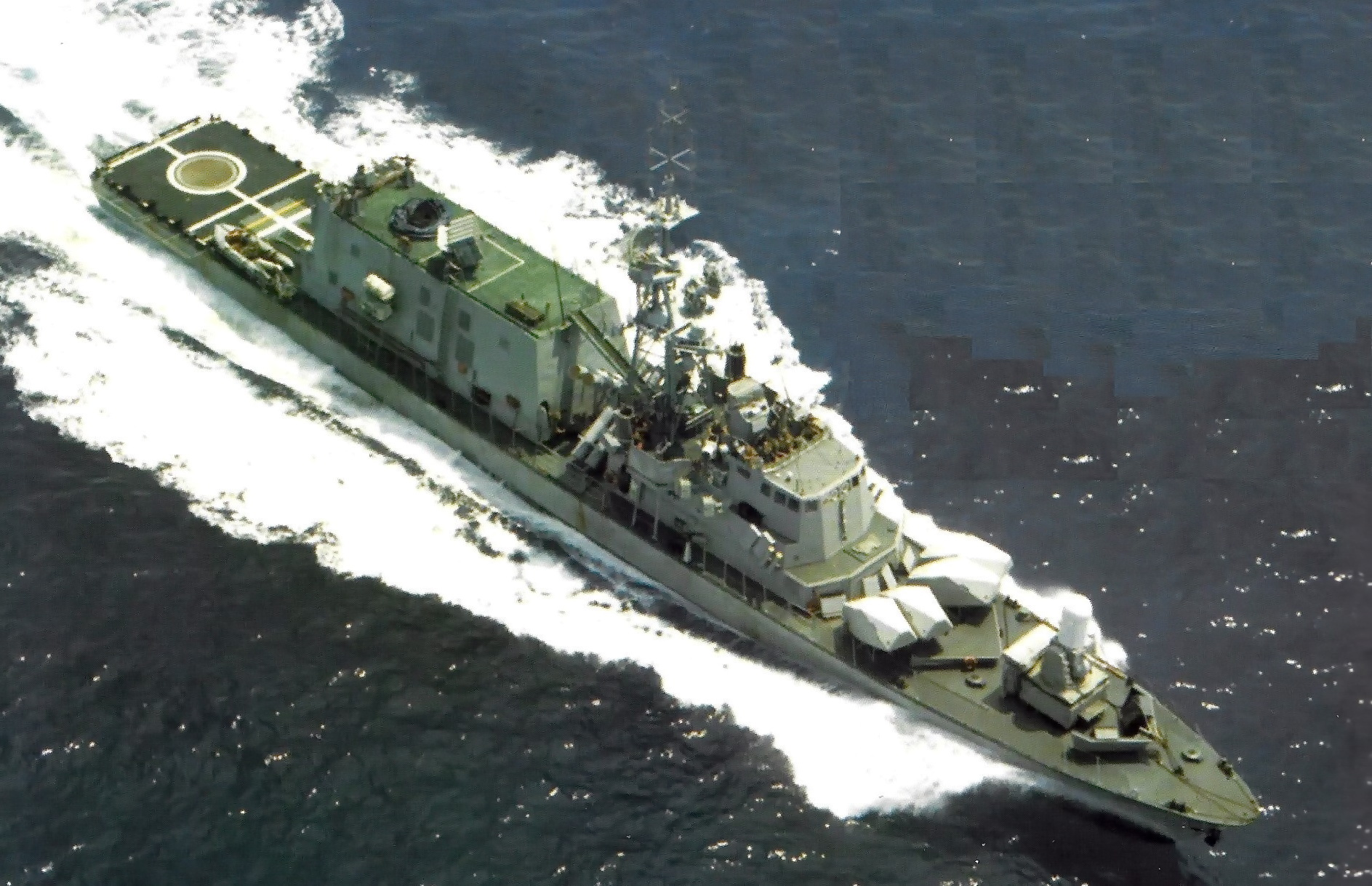
INS Geula in 1982.

The first two Sa'ar 4.5 boats were Aliya subclass. Two boats of this version were built and launched in 1980, the first one being INS Aliya, followed by INS Geula. Additionally to the anti-ship missiles, these missile boats were equipped with aviation facilities that could accommodate two (one on a regular basis) Bell 206, MD 500, or HH-65 helicopters. Eurocopter Panther was the last helicopter deployed on these boats in the Israeli Navy. The Aliya subclass are the smallest warships with a helipad and helicopter hangar.

In August 1984, INS Aliya and INS Geula were sent to destroy a terrorist facility in Nahr al-Bared, northern Lebanon. Two MD 500 Defenders from INS Aliya and another two from INS Geula successfully hit the target. In July 1985, INS Aliya and INS Geula carried out a similar mission near Nahr al-Bared.

=== Hetz subclass ===
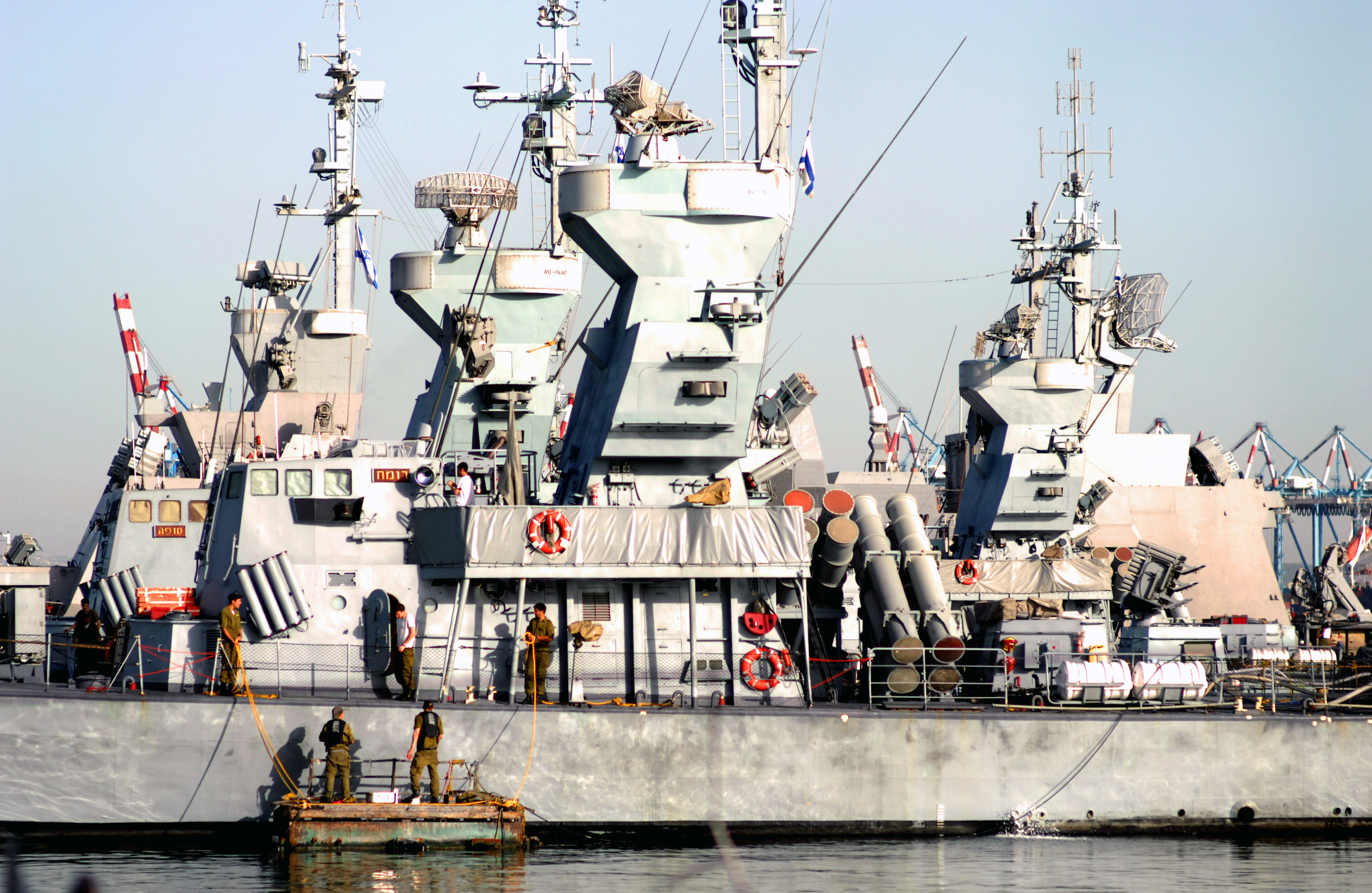
INS Romach in front, INS Sufa in back in 2008

Sa'ar 4.5 Hetz-subclass missile boats lack the helicopter facilities of the Aliya subclass, but have more weapon systems fitted. They are largely based on the Sa'ar 4-class missile boat with improvements in electronic systems: command and control, detection, classification and identification, fire control system, radar (EL/M-2258 active electronically scanned array), sonar, electronic warfare and communications. The engines and propulsion systems were also upgraded. The boat itself is 4 metres (13 ft) longer than the Sa'ar 4-class missile boats to accommodate the new systems.

== Future replacement ==
Beginning in the mid-2020s, the Israeli Navy plans to replace the Sa'ar 4.5 boats with the future Reshef-class corvettes. These vessels will be based on Israel Shipyards' Sa'ar S - 72 design. They will deploy advanced weaponry and defensive systems, including C-Dome.

== Users ==
=== Israel ===
As of 2019, eight Hetz-subclass boats are in service with the Israeli Navy.

=== Mexico ===
In January 2004 both INS Aliya and INS Geula were sold to Mexico for service in the Mexican Navy. On August 23, 2004 the boats were relaunched in Mexico renamed ARM Huracán and ARM Tormenta. Press reports indicate that Israel removed the Harpoon missile systems prior to the sale, however, the Gabriel anti-ship missile systems were included in the package.

=== Greece ===
The Hellenic Coast Guard bought three offshore patrol boats based on the Sa'ar 4.5 Nirit-class design, but armed only with a 30 mm gun. A crane is installed at the deck space normally reserved for missiles.

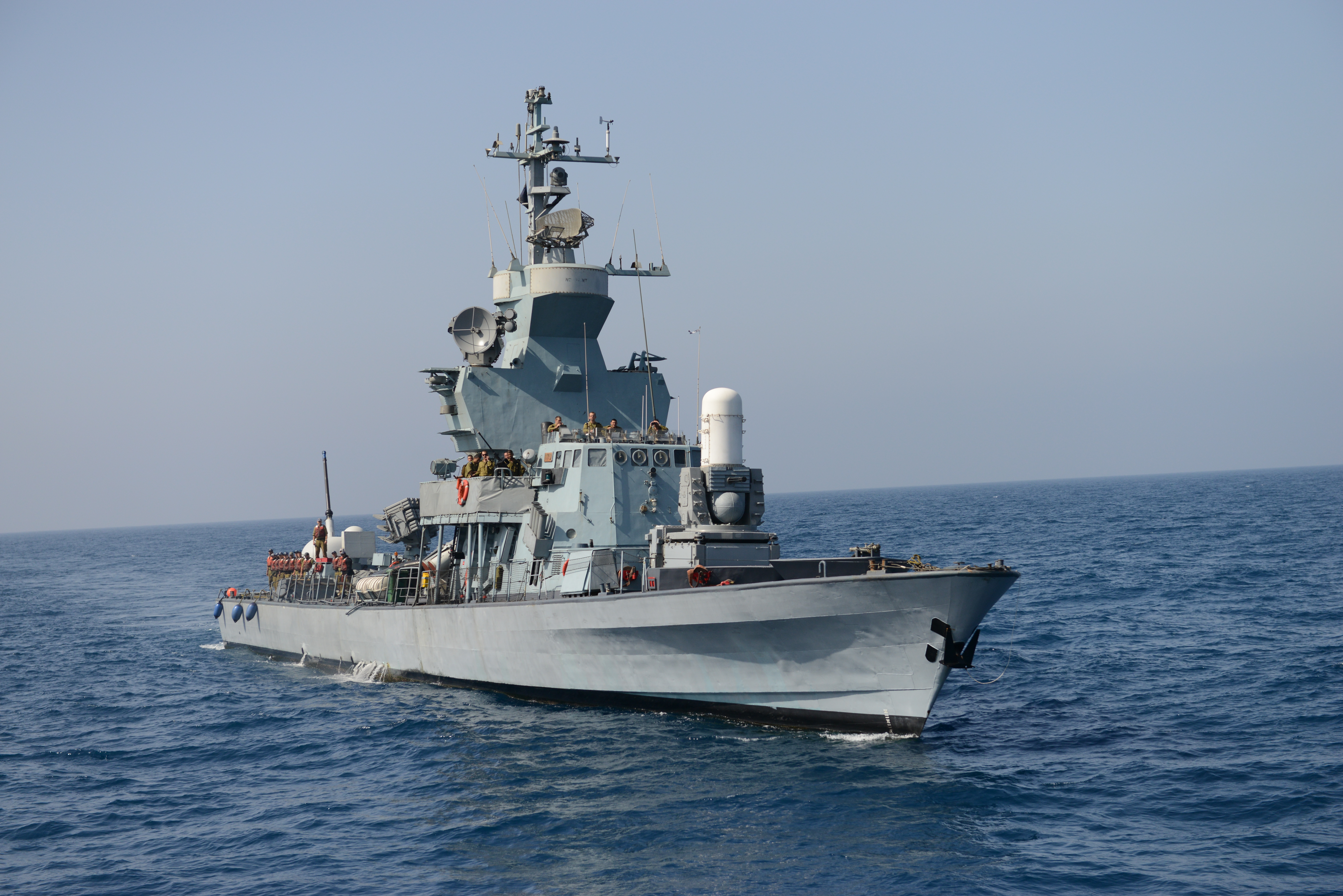
INS Kidon in 2012

== See also ==
- List of ships of the Israeli Navy
