= INS Sufa (2003) =

Sa'ar 4.5-class missile boat of the Israeli Navy

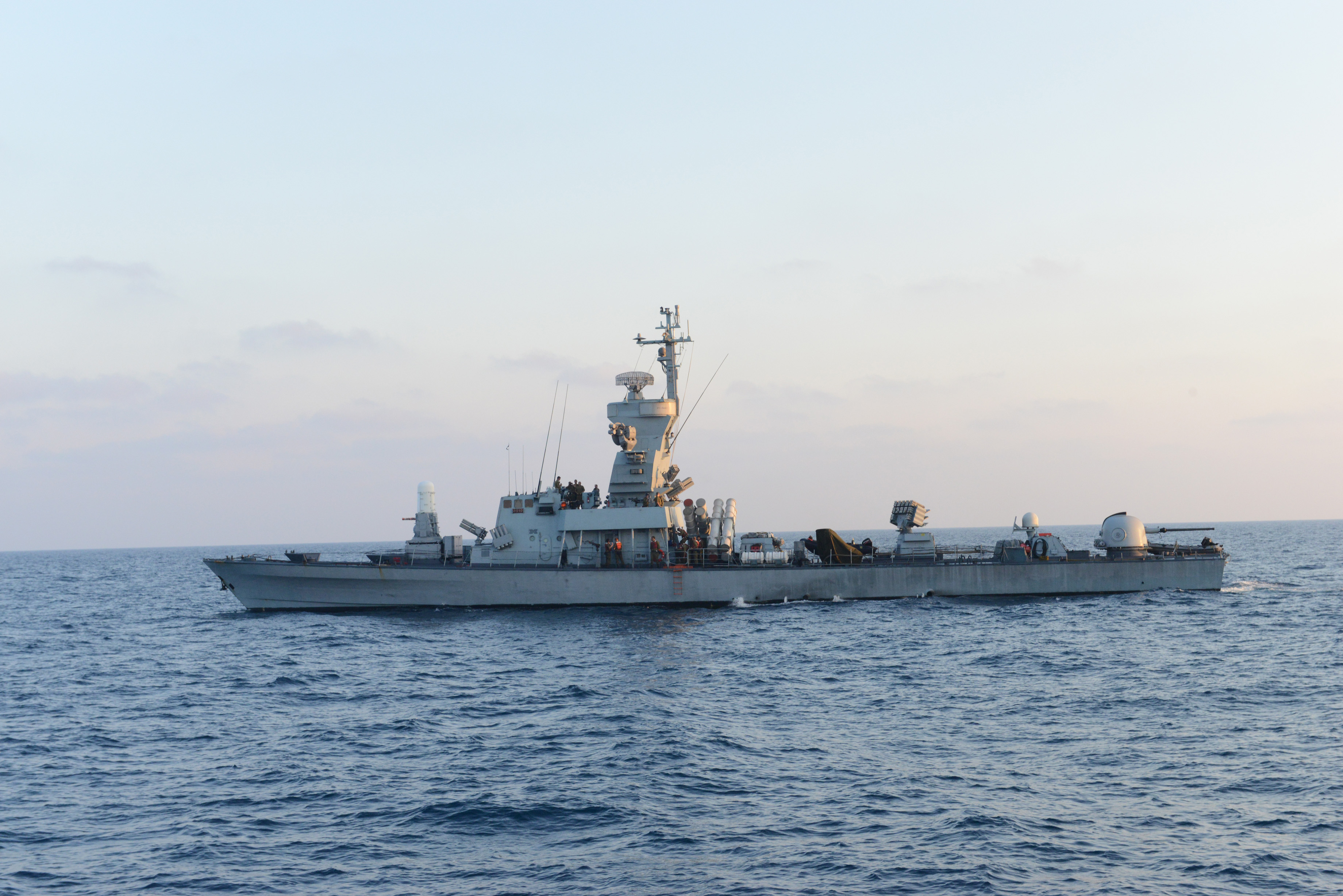
- INS Sufa during operation Protective Edge

History

Israel
- Name: Sufa
- Namesake: Storm
- Builder: Israel Shipyards Ltd.
- Launched: August 2002
- Commissioned: May 2003
- Status: Active
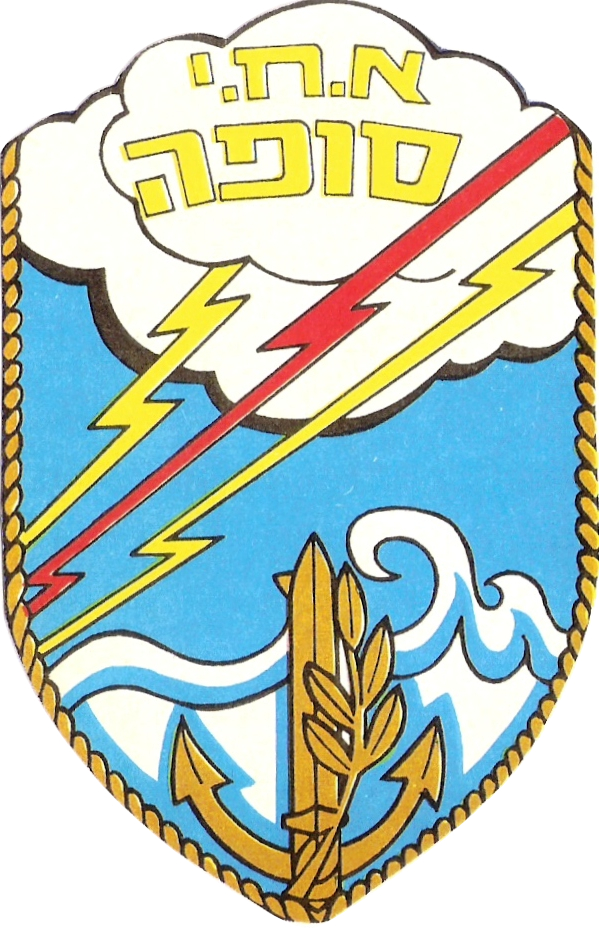
- Badge

General characteristics
- Class & type: Sa'ar 4.5-class missile boat
- Displacement: 488 tonnes (full load); 430 tonnes (standard)
- Length: 61.7 m (202.43 ft)
- Beam: 7.62 m (25.00 ft)
- Draft: 2.8 m (9.19 ft)
- Propulsion: 4 MTU 16V 396 TB91 diesel engines, four shafts, total of 16,000 shp (12,000 kW)
- Speed: 34 knots (63 km/h)
- Range: 4,800 nautical miles (8,900 km) at 19 knots (35 km/h); 2,200 nautical miles (4,100 km) at 30 knots (56 km/h)
- Boats & landing craft carried: 1 Rigid hull inflatable boat
- Complement: 53 officers and crewmen
- Sensors & processing systems: Elta EL/M-2218S air search radar; Elta EL/M-2221 fire-control radar
- Electronic warfare & decoys: Elbit chaff rocket launchers; Rafael RF corner reflector; Elisra NS-9003A/9005 RWR
- Armament: 8 x RGM-84 Harpoon anti-ship missiles; 16 x Barak 1 surface-to-air missiles; 1 x OTO Melara 76 mm naval gun; 2 x 0.5 in (12.70 mm) caliber M2 Browning machine guns; 3 x 7.62 mm FN MAG 58 general-purpose machine guns; 1 x 20 mm Phalanx CIWS

The INS Sufa (Hebrew: סופה, Storm) is a Sa'ar 4.5-class missile boat of the Israeli Navy's Shayetet 3 Flotilla, built by Israel Shipyards Ltd. and commissioned in May 2003.

The ship is not the first to use this name, which was also used by a previous Sa'ar 3-class missile boat which was the command ship at "Operation Noa" in which the remaining 5 boats (including itself) escaped from Cherbourg (France) during the French embargo in 1969.

== See also ==
- INS Herev
- INS Tarshish
