= ELS-8994 StarLight =

Defense analysis system

ELS-8994 StarLight is a cloud-based multi-intelligence (Multi-INT) analysis system developed by Israel Aerospace Industries (IAI) subsidiary ELTA Systems. Built as an application suite, combining databases, sensors, and networks, Starlight is designed to gather large amounts of data from various sources and transform it into actionable intelligence for defense and national security organizations to provide commanders, warfighters, and intelligence analysts with decision-support tools, by transforming large amounts of unstructured data gathered from various intelligence, surveillance, and reconnaissance (ISR) sensors into actionable intelligence and insights.

== Operational history ==
The StarLight system has been operational and demonstrated to several customers operating with special mission aircraft, and spy satellites. The system also operates with IAI's Heron UAS.
