= Israel Shipyards =

Israeli shipbuilding and repair company

Israel Shipyards Ltd

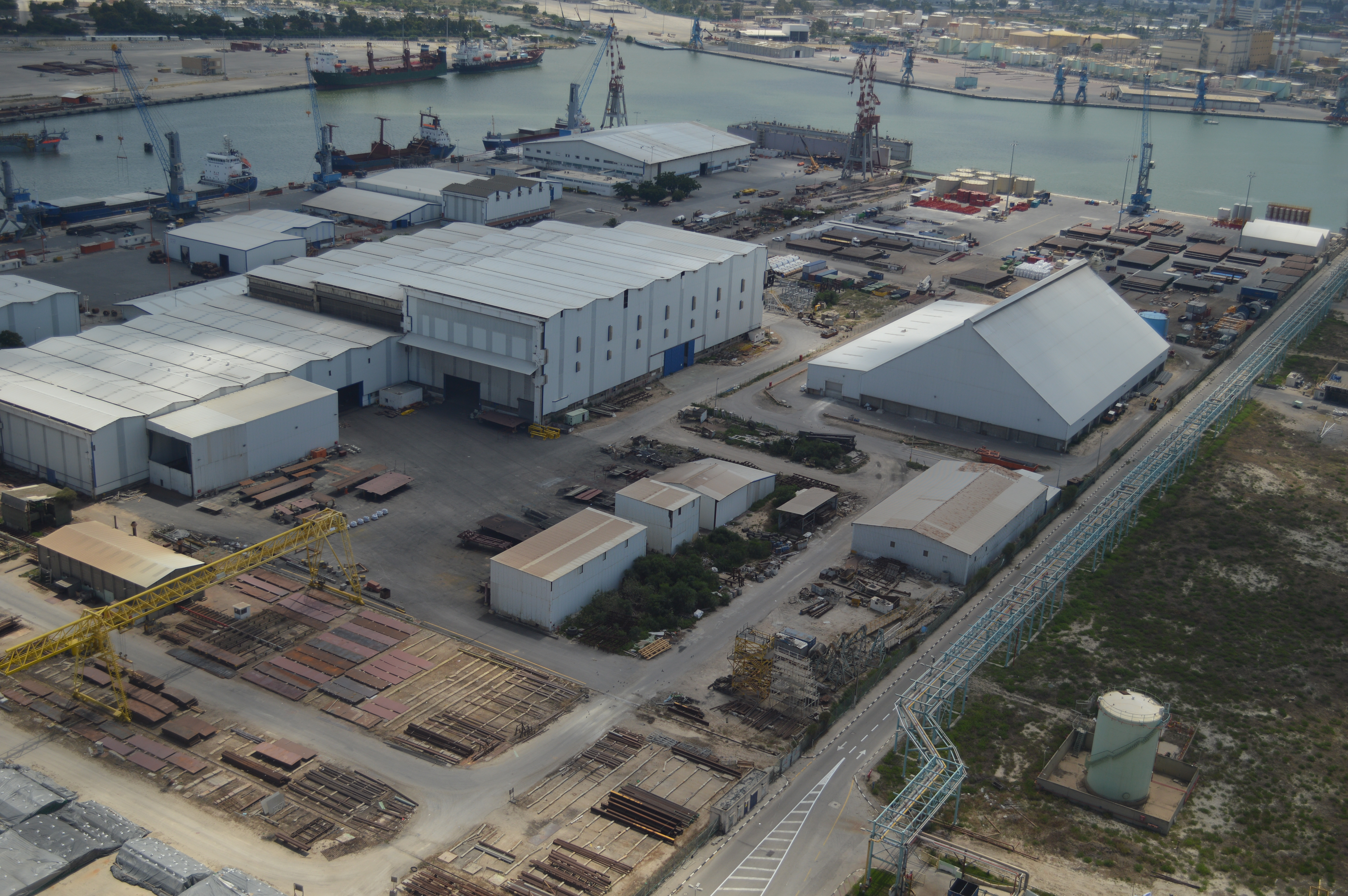
- Aerial view of Israel Shipyards in June 2013
- Native name: מספנות ישראל
- Type: privately held limited company (former government-owned corporation)
- Industry: Shipbuilding; Defense
- Founded: 1959; 67 years ago
- Founder: Government of Israel
- Headquarters: Kishon Port, Haifa, Israel
- Key people: Samy Katsav (Chairman); Eitan Zucker (general manager)
- Products: missile boats, patrol boats, tugboats, multipurpose boats and cranes
- Revenue: ₪ 599 million (2014)
- Number of employees: 378
- Website: www.israel-shipyards.com

Israel Shipyards is a large shipbuilding and repair facility in the eastern Mediterranean. The company also operates a privately owned port adjacent to the shipyard. The company's facilities are located at the Kishon Port (part of the Port of Haifa complex), next to Uri Michaeli Haifa International Airport.

The shipyard has 330,000 square metres (3,600,000 sq ft) of manufacture and repair space, with 45,000 square metres (480,000 sq ft) being roof-covered.

Facilities include a shiplift (Syncrolift), capable of lifting up to 3,000 tons, or 100-meter (330 ft) long and 18-meter (59 ft) wide ships. The yard has a total of 1,000 meters (3,300 ft) of quays with 12 meters (39 ft) of water depth.

== History ==
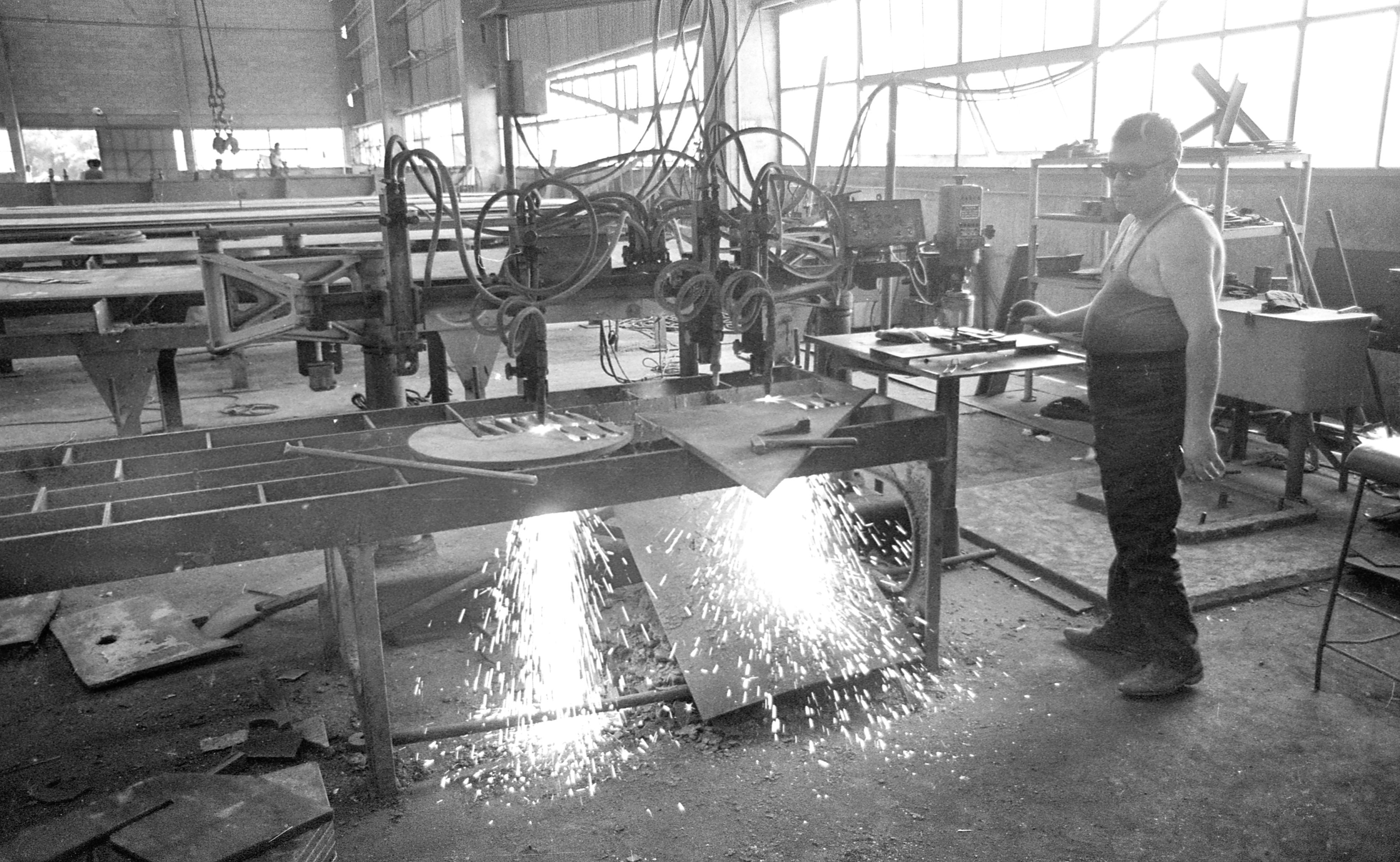
Work in Israel Shipyards, 1969

The company was founded in 1959 by the State of Israel to build both military and civilian ships, and to provide marine engineering upgrade, maintenance and repair services. In 1995, following years of underperformance and continued losses under state ownership, the company was privatized and sold to a group of local investors who, since 1998, have returned it to profitability.

Israel Shipyards is controlled by the Shlomo Group (TASE:SHLD), a holding group owned by businessman Shlomo Shmeltzer.

In May 2013 Israel Shipyard unveiled a new ‘Mini Corvette’ design, the Sa'ar S-72 class; to offer the Israeli Navy a new class, which fits between the Navy's existing Sa'ar 4.5-class missile boats, and Sa'ar 5-class corvettes. Through the years Israel Shipyards have built 40 Sa'ar-class missile boats; 20 were delivered to the Israeli Navy over the years. Last to be delivered were two upgraded Sa'ar 4.5 Hetz-subclass missile boats called INS Herev (2002) and INS Sufa (2003). With the new Mini Corvette the shipyard hoped to expand its offering to meet the evolving requirements, of the Israeli Navy, as well as of international customers overseas.

== Products and services ==
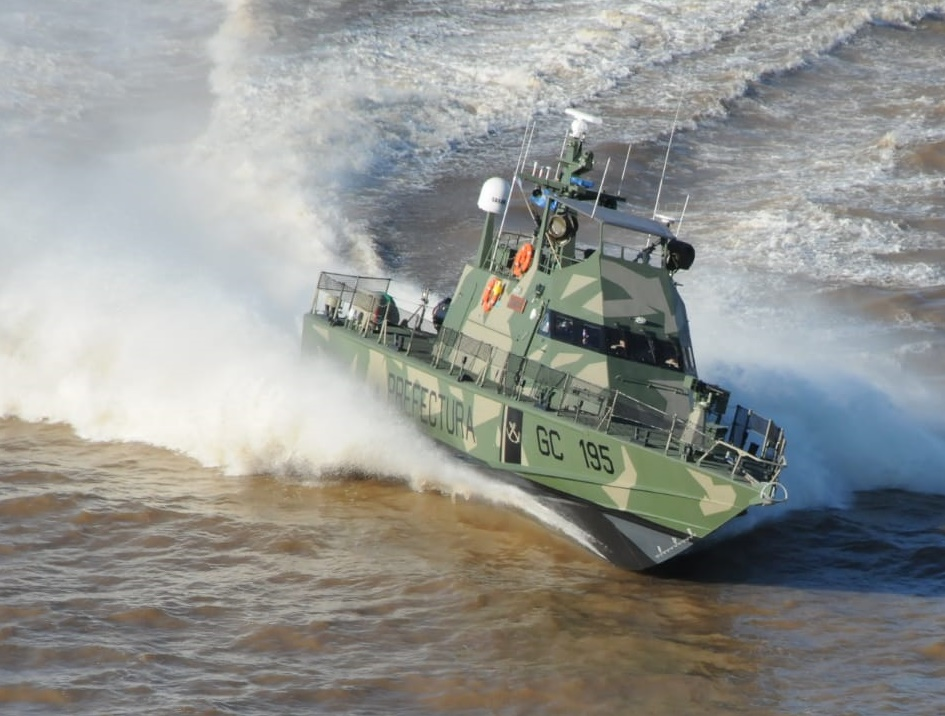
Shaldag MK II

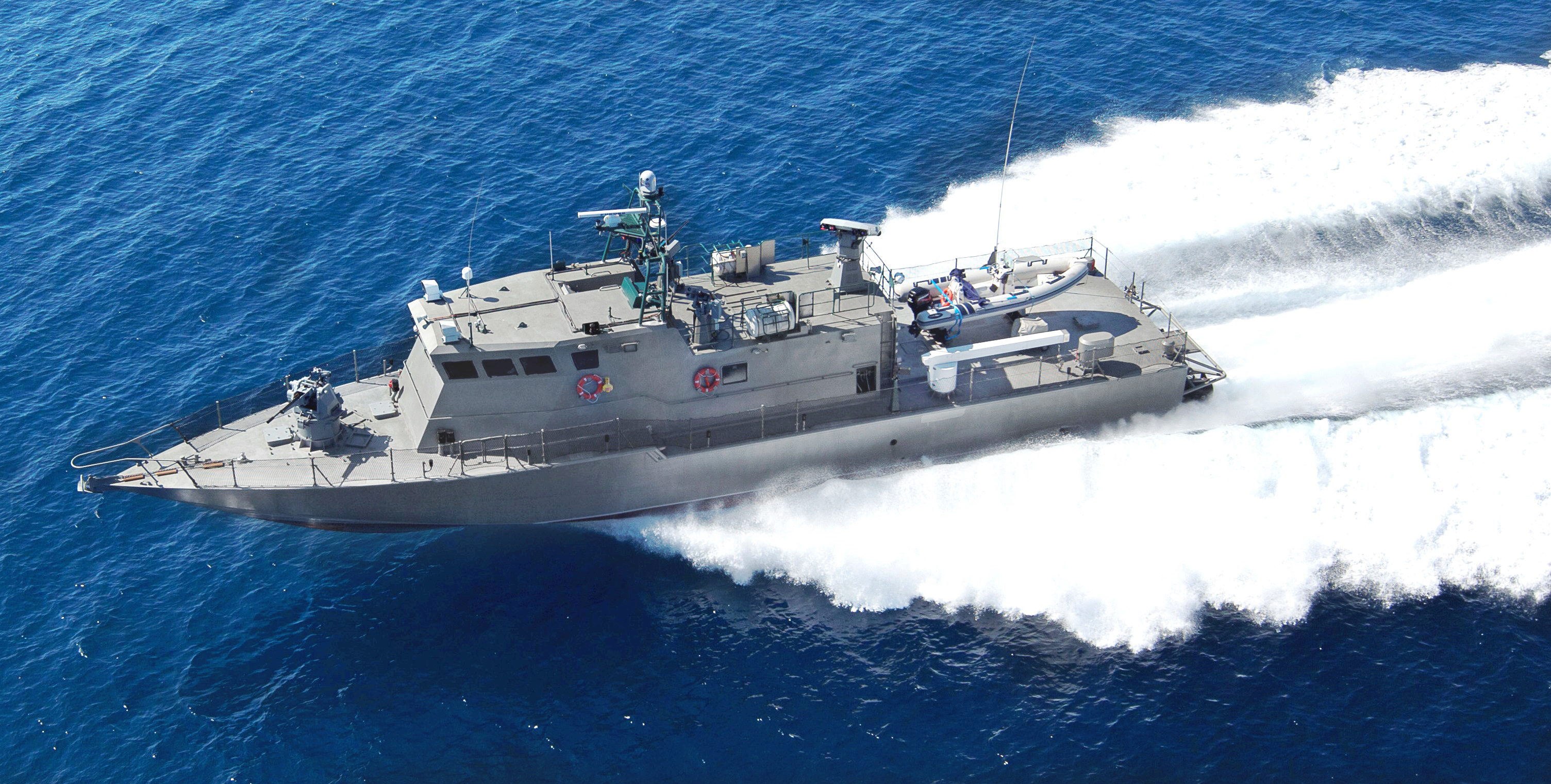
Shaldag MK V

OPV 45m

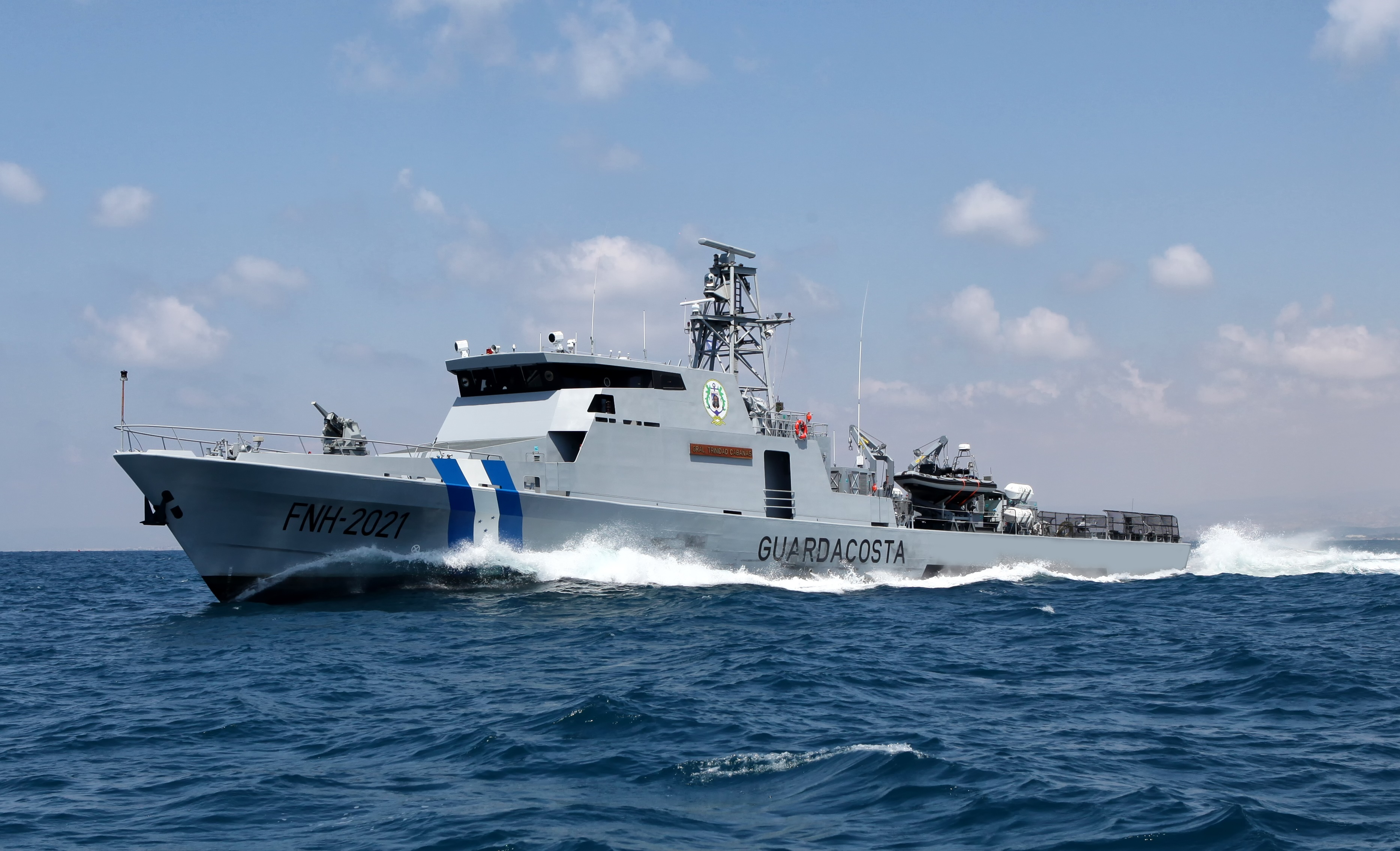
OPV 62m

=== Naval vessels ===
==== Corvettes ====
- Reshef-class corvette

==== Fast attack craft (FAC) ====
- Sa'ar 4-class missile boat
- Sa'ar 4.5-class missile boat

==== Offshore patrol vessels (OPV) ====
- OPV 58m
- OPV 62m
- OPV 45m

==== Fast patrol craft (FPC) ====
- Shaldag-class patrol boat
- Zivanit-class hydrofoil patrol boats

==== Landing craft ====
- 24m Landing Craft Mechanized (LCM)

=== Merchant vessels ===
- Tugboats
- Bulk freighters
- Floating dry docks

=== Ship repairs ===
The Shipyards has capability and experience to design and execute projects such as:

- Damage repair of merchant ships
- Jumboizing of container ships
- Conversion and modification of cargo vessels
- Repairs and maintenance of merchant and Naval vessels

=== Industrial structures ===
The company uses its facilities to build and deliver non-ship related commissions; recently completed projects include:

- Panamax and Post Panamax container cranes
- Harbor construction and cargo handling installations
- Coal unloading steel piers and cranes for the Orot Rabin power plant
- Industrial large pressure vessels
- Potash storage and loading installation
- Jet bridges for Ben Gurion International Airport's terminal 3
- Infrastructure components for offshore oil and gas production

=== Port and cargo services ===
The shipyard operates a private port which specializes in handling general and bulk cargoes. Some of the onsite facilities include:

- Grain elevator with total silo storage capacity of 65,000 m^{3} (expandable to 110,000 m^{3}) and pneumatic ship unloaders
- Dry cement silos with a storage capacity of 34,000 metric tons
- Railway freight terminal comprising a total of 1.5 km of railroad sidings connected to Israel Railways' network

== List of ships built by Israel Shipyards (partial list) ==
Name	Class	Built For	Launched	Fate	Image
INS Etzion Gever (P-51)	Kishon-class landing craft	Israeli Navy	January 1963	Sold for civilian use in 1984, used as a fishing boat in Eilat	
INS Reshef (Spark)	Sa'ar 4-class missile boat	Israeli Navy; Chilean Navy	February 1973	Sold to Chile in 1997 as LM-34 Angamos	
INS Keshet (Bow)	Sa'ar 4-class missile boat	Israeli Navy; Chilean Navy	October 1973	Sold to Chile in 1981 as LM-31 Chipana	
INS Romach (Lance)	Sa'ar 4-class missile boat	Israeli Navy; Chilean Navy	1974	Sold to Chile in 1979 as LM-30 Casma	
INS Kidon (Javelin)	Sa'ar 4-class missile boat	Israeli Navy	1974	Retired – The old hull sunk as an underwater memorial	
INS Tarshish	Sa'ar 4-class missile boat	Israeli Navy; Chilean Navy	1975	Sold to Chile in 1997 as LM-35 Papudo	
INS Yaffo (Jaffa)	Sa'ar 4-class missile boat	Israeli Navy	1975	Retired	
INS Nitzachon (Victory)	Sa'ar 4-class missile boat	Israeli Navy	July 1978	Redirected to anti-submarine warfare	
INS Atzmaut (Independence)	Sa'ar 4-class missile boat	Israeli Navy	December 1978	Redirected to anti-submarine warfare	
INS Moledet (Homeland)	Sa'ar 4-class missile boat	Israeli Navy; Sri Lanka Navy	1979	Redirected to anti-submarine warfare, sold to Sri Lanka in 2000 as SLNS Suranimala.	
INS Komemiyut (Sovereignty)	Sa'ar 4-class missile boat	Israeli Navy; Sri Lanka Navy	1980	Redirected to anti-submarine warfare, sold to Sri Lanka in 2000 as SLNS Nandimitra	
INS Aliya (Homecoming)	Sa'ar 4.5-class missile boat	Israeli Navy	July 1980	Refitted and sold to Mexico in 2004 as ARM Huracán	
INS Geula (Salvation)	Sa'ar 4.5-class missile boat	Israeli Navy	October 1980	Refitted and sold to Mexico in 2004 as ARM Tormenta	
INS Romach (Halberd)	Sa'ar 4.5-class missile boat	Israeli Navy	1981	Active	
INS Keshet (Bow)	Sa'ar 4.5-class missile boat	Israeli Navy	1982	Active	
INS Shlomit	Zivanit-class hydrofoil missile boat	Israeli Navy	1983	Sold for scrap metal in September 1991 due to technical unreliability	
INS Hetz (Arrow)	Sa'ar 4.5-class missile boat	Israeli Navy	1991	Active	
INS Tarshish	Sa'ar 4.5-class missile boat	Israeli Navy	1995	Sa'ar 4 class built in 1974 and converted to Sa'ar 4.5 class in 1994, Active	
INS Kidon (Lance)	Sa'ar 4.5-class missile boat	Israeli Navy	1995	Sa'ar 4 class built in 1974 and converted to Sa'ar 4.5 class in 1994, Active	
INS Yaffo (Jaffa)	Sa'ar 4.5-class missile boat	Israeli Navy	1998	Sa'ar 4 class built in 1974 and converted to Sa'ar 4.5 class in 1998, Active	
INS Herev (Sword)	Sa'ar 4.5-class missile boat	Israeli Navy	2002	Active	
INS Sufa (Storm)	Sa'ar 4.5-class missile boat	Israeli Navy	2003	Active	
ΛΣ-060	OPV 58m-class offshore patrol vessel	Hellenic Coast Guard	December 2003	Active	
ΛΣ-070	OPV 58m-class offshore patrol vessel	Hellenic Coast Guard	February 2004	Active	
ΛΣ-080	OPV 58m-class offshore patrol vessel	Hellenic Coast Guard	April 2004	Active	
ARM Huracán	Sa'ar 4.5-class missile boat	Mexican Navy	2004	Active	
ARM Tormenta	Sa'ar 4.5-class missile boat	Mexican Navy	2004	Active	
Shaldag MK II	Shaldag-class patrol boat	Navy of Equatorial Guinea	2005	Active. Two Shaldag Mk II fast patrol boats constructed in 2004 and delivered in 2005.	
	Bulk freighters	A commercial customer	2008	Active. A 90 m (300 ft) long, 15 m (49 ft) beam bulk freighters	
	Bulk freighters	A commercial customer	2009	Active	
	Bulk freighters	A commercial customer	2009	Active	
	Bulk freighters	A commercial customer	2010	Active	
Kié-Ntem	OPV 62m-class offshore patrol vessel	Navy of Equatorial Guinea	2011	Active	
Litoral	OPV 62m-class offshore patrol vessel	Navy of Equatorial Guinea	2011	Active	
Shaldag MK II	Shaldag-class patrol boat	Israeli Navy		Active	
Shaldag MK III	Shaldag-class patrol boat	Israeli Navy		Active	
Shaldag MK III	Shaldag-class patrol boat	Sri Lanka Navy		Active	
Shaldag MK II	Shaldag-class patrol boat	Nigerian Navy		Active	
Commodore Andreas Ioannides (P61)	OPV 62m-class offshore patrol vessel	Cyprus Navy	2017	Active	
Shaldag MK II	Shaldag-class patrol boat	Argentine Naval Prefecture	2018	Active	
General José Trinidad Cabañas (FNH-2021)	OPV 62m-class offshore patrol vessel	Honduran Navy	2019	Active	
Esperance (P2202)	OPV 45m-class offshore patrol vessel	Ivory Coast Navy	2023	Active	
Vaillance (P2203)	OPV 45m-class offshore patrol vessel	Ivory Coast Navy	2024	Active	
Fadioth	24m Landing Craft Mechanized (LCM)	Senegal Navy	2024	Active	
Yoff	24m Landing Craft Mechanized (LCM)	Senegal Navy	2024	Active	
	OPV 62m-class offshore patrol vessel	Cyprus Navy		Under construction	
INS (??)	Reshef-class corvette	Israeli Navy		Under construction	
