= INS Tarshish =

Israeli Sa'ar 4.5-class missile boat

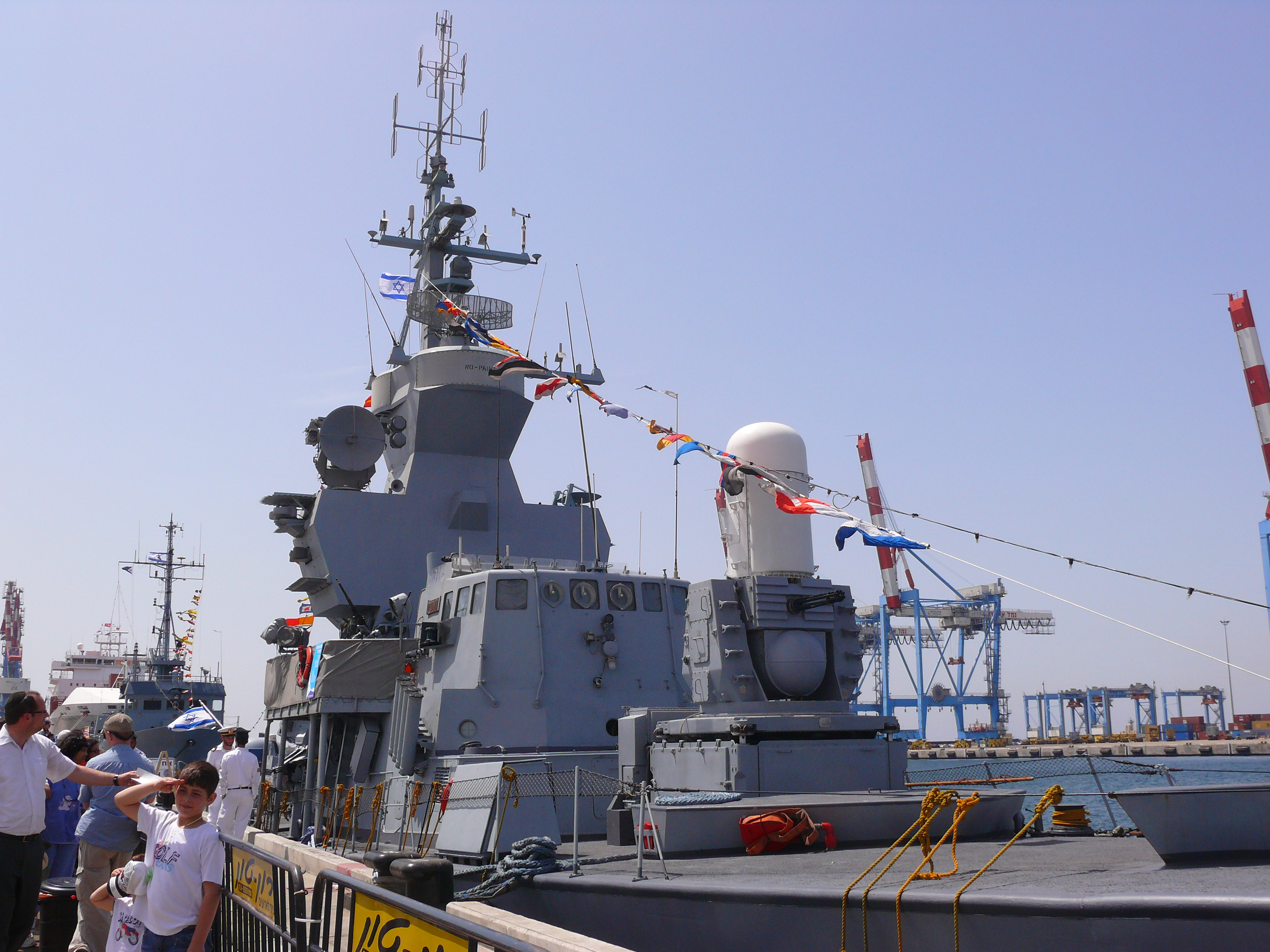
- Tarshish at Israel 61st Independence Day display, May 2009

History

Israel
- Name: Tarshish
- Namesake: Tarshish
- Builder: Israel Shipyards Ltd.
- Commissioned: June 1995
- Status: Active
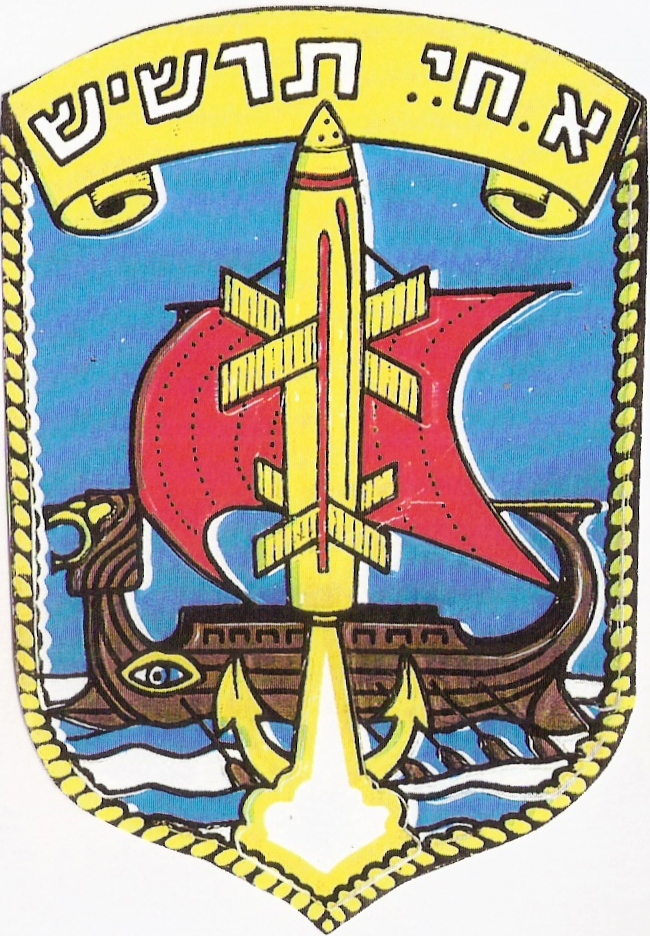
- Badge

General characteristics
- Class & type: Sa'ar 4.5-class missile boat
- Displacement: 488 t (480 long tons) (full load); 430 t (420 long tons) (standard)
- Length: 61.7 m (202 ft 5 in)
- Beam: 7.62 m (25 ft 0 in)
- Draft: 2.8 m (9 ft 2 in)
- Installed power: 4 diesel engines; 16,000 bhp (12,000 kW)
- Propulsion: 4 shafts
- Speed: 34 knots (63 km/h; 39 mph)
- Range: 4,800 nmi (8,900 km; 5,500 mi) at 19 knots (35 km/h)
- Boats & landing craft carried: 1 rigid hull inflatable boat
- Complement: 53 officers and crewmen
- Sensors & processing systems: Elta EL/M-2218S air search radar; Elta EL/M-2221 fire-control radar
- Electronic warfare & decoys: Elbit chaff rocket launchers; Rafael RF corner reflector; Elisra NS-9003A/9005 RWR
- Armament: 8 x RGM-84 Harpoon anti-ship missiles; 16 x Barak 1 surface-to-air missiles; 1 x OTO Melara 76 mm naval gun; 2 x 0.5 in (12.70 mm) caliber M2 Browning machine guns; 3 x 7.62 mm FN MAG 58 general-purpose machine guns; 1 x 20 mm Phalanx CIWS

INS Tarshish (Hebrew: תרשיש, Tarshish) is a Sa'ar 4.5-class missile boat of the Israeli Navy's Shayetet 3 Flotilla, built by Israel Shipyards Ltd. and commissioned in June 1995.

The Sa'ar 4.5 (Hebrew: סער 4.5) is a class of Israeli Sea Corps missile boats designed and built by Israel Shipyards Ltd. as an improved and stretched Sa'ar 4-class missile boat. There are two different subclasses that are both named Sa'ar 4.5. The first subclass was initially called Chochit (Hebrew: חוחית), but renamed to Aliya (Hebrew: עליה). Two Aliya-subclass boats are in service with the Mexican Navy. The second subclass was initially called Nirit (Hebrew: נירית) but renamed to Hetz (Hebrew: חץ). Eight Hetz-subclass boats are in service with the Israeli Navy.

== See also ==
- INS Sufa
- INS Herev

== Bibliography ==
- Saunders, Stephen, ed. (2004). Jane's Fighting Ships 2004–2005. Coulsdon, UK: Jane's Information Group. ISBN 0-7106-2623-1.
