= ARM Tormenta =

Mexican naval vessel

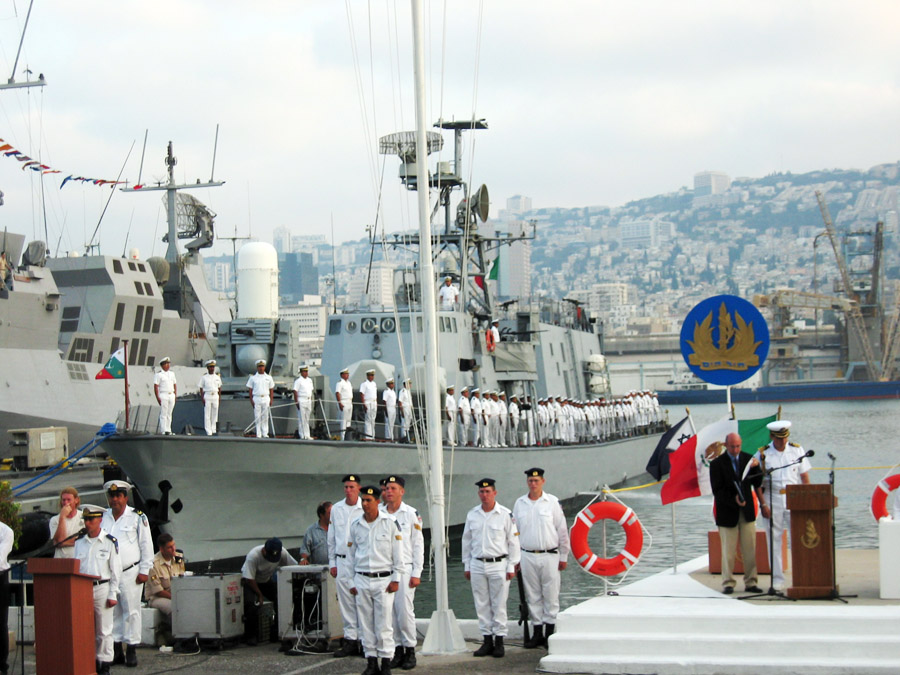
- Ceremony of transferring INS Geula and INS Aliya from the Israeli Navy to the Navy of Mexico.

History

Mexico
- Name: Tormenta
- Builder: Israel Shipyards Ltd.
- Commissioned: August 23, 2004
- In service: 2
- Status: In active service

General characteristics
- Class & type: Sa'ar 4.5-class missile boat (Aliya subclass)
- Displacement: 498 tonnes
- Length: 61.7 m (202 ft)
- Beam: 7.62 m (25.0 ft)
- Draft: 2.8 m (9 ft 2 in)
- Propulsion: 4 MTU V16 diesel engines
- Speed: 19 knots (35 km/h) (cruise speed); 33 knots (61 km/h) (top speed)
- Complement: 53 officers and crewmen
- Sensors & processing systems: Thales Neptune air & surface search radar; Selenia Orion fire-control radar
- Electronic warfare & decoys: Elbit chaff rocket launchers; Elisra NS-9003A/9005 RWR
- Armament: 4 Gabriel anti-ship missiles; Oerlikon 20 mm cannon; Phalanx CIWS; 2 M2 Browning machine guns
- Aircraft carried: ah64d
- Aviation facilities: One helicopter hangar and Helipad

ARM Tormenta (A-302) is a missile boat in the Mexican Navy. Previously a Sa'ar 4.5-class missile boat in the Israeli Sea Corps named INS Geula, it was bought by Mexico and placed under control of the Mexican Navy. Its sister ship is ARM Huracán.

The Geula was built by Israel Shipyards in 1981 and was purchased by Mexico in 2004 for $45 million, being renamed Tormenta. The vessel has since served in the Gulf of Mexico and the Caribbean Sea. Tormenta and Huracán became the first Mexican Navy vessels to launch anti-ship missiles when they fired their Gabriel weapons. Early in his career Rear Admiral Eabani Gaviña Astudillo commanded the vessel.
