= ARM Huracán =

1981 Sa'ar 4.5-class missile boat

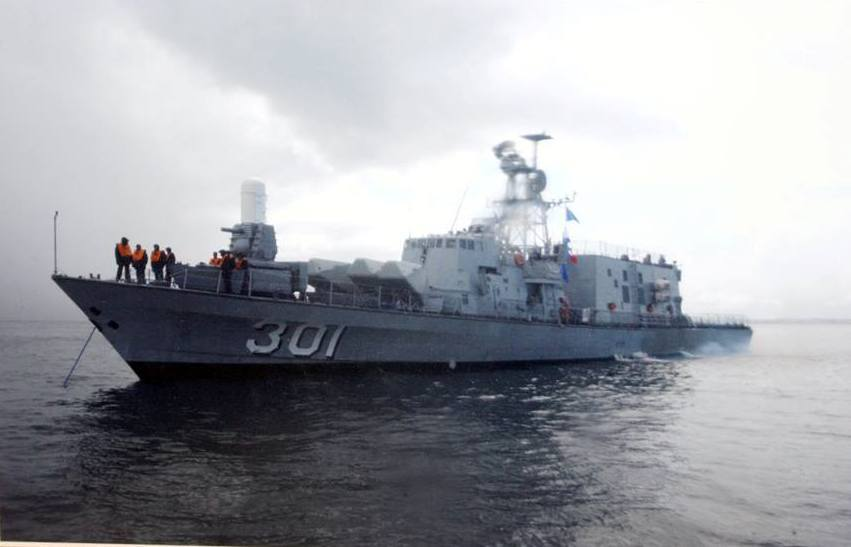

History

Mexico
- Name: Huracán
- Builder: Israel Shipyards Ltd.
- Commissioned: August 23, 2004
- In service: 2
- Status: In active service

General characteristics
- Class & type: Sa'ar 4.5-class missile boat (Aliya subclass)
- Displacement: 498 tonnes
- Length: 61.7 m (202 ft)
- Beam: 7.62 m (25.0 ft)
- Draft: 2.8 m (9 ft 2 in)
- Propulsion: 4 MTU V16 diesel engines
- Speed: 19 knots (35 km/h) (cruise speed); 33 knots (61 km/h) (top speed)
- Complement: 53 officers and crewmen
- Sensors & processing systems: Thales Neptune air & surface search radar; Selenia Orion fire-control radar
- Electronic warfare & decoys: Elbit chaff rocket launchers; Elisra NS-9003A/9005 RWR
- Armament: 4 Gabriel anti-ship missiles; 2 Oerlikon 20 mm cannon; Phalanx CIWS; 2-4 M2 Browning machine guns
- Aviation facilities: One helicopter hangar and helipad

ARM Huracán (A-301) is a missile boat in the Mexican Navy. Previously the Israeli Navy Sa'ar 4.5-class missile boat INS Aliya, was bought by Mexico for the Mexican Navy. Press reports indicate that the Israelis removed the Harpoon missile systems prior to the sale, though the Gabriel anti-ship missile systems were included in the package.

ARM Huracán was built by Israel Shipyards Ltd in 1981 and underwent a complete overhaul before its transfer to the Mexican Navy on August 23, 2004.
