= Sa'ar 4-class fast attack craft =

Israeli Navy ship class

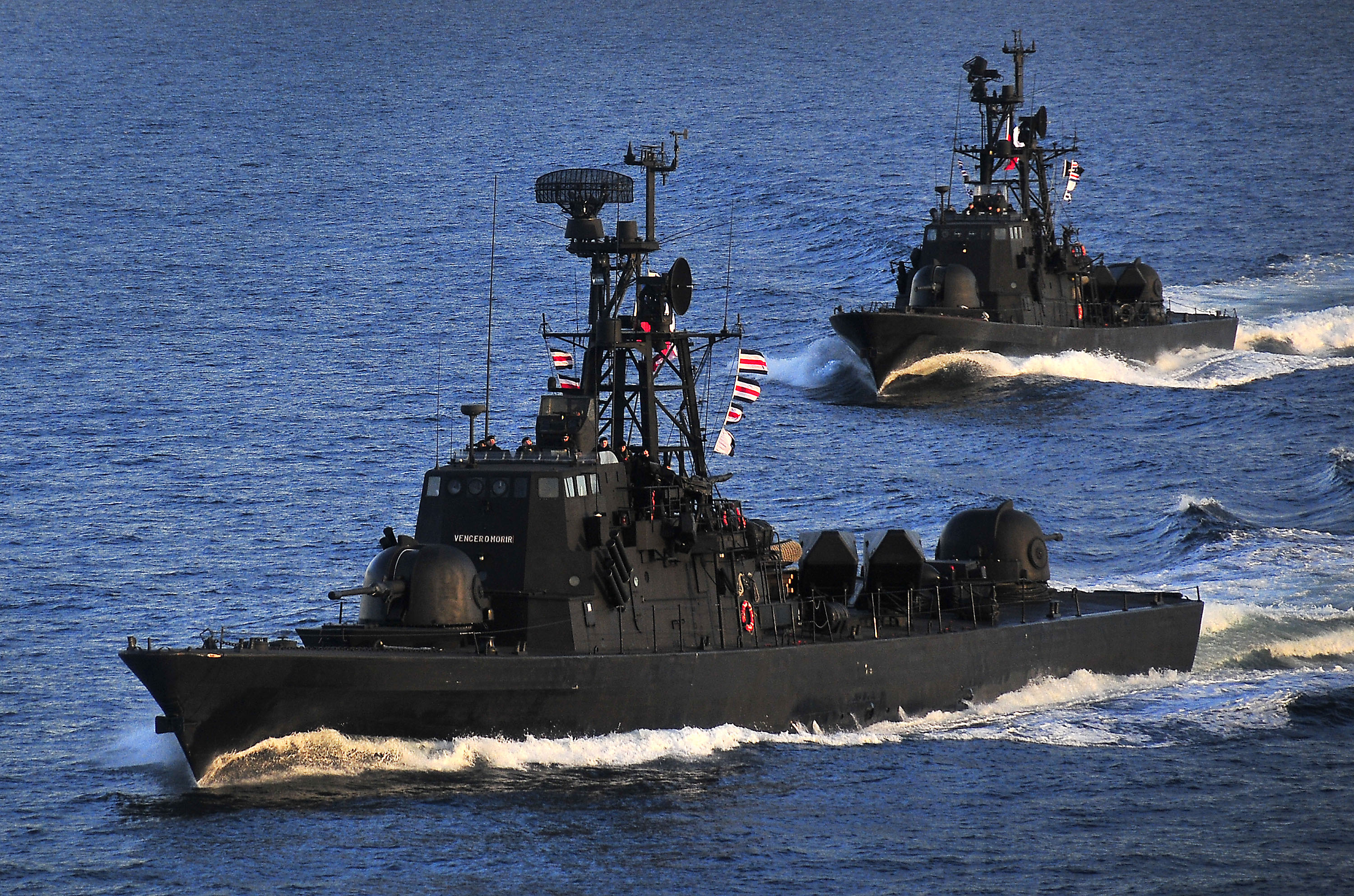
- Chilean Navy Sa'ar 4-class fast-attack craft Angamos and Casma perform tactical maneuvering exercises in the Strait of Magellan

Class overview
- Name: Sa'ar 4 class
- Builders: Israel Shipyards
- Operators: Israeli Navy; Chilean Navy; South African Navy; Sri Lanka Navy; Navy of Equatorial Guinea
- Preceded by: Sa'ar 3 class
- Succeeded by: Sa'ar 4.5 class

General characteristics
- Type: Fast attack craft
- Displacement: 415 tons; 450 tons full loaded
- Length: 58 m (190 ft)
- Beam: 7.62 m (25.0 ft)
- Draught: 2.4 m (7.9 ft)
- Propulsion: 4 MTU 16V 538 diesel engines, 4 shafts, total of 12,800 hp (9,500 kW)
- Speed: 34 knots (63 km/h; 39 mph)
- Range: 4,000 nmi (7,400 km; 4,600 mi) at 17.5 knots (32.4 km/h); 1,650 nmi (3,060 km; 1,900 mi) at 30 knots (56 km/h; 35 mph)
- Complement: 45
- Sensors & processing systems: Elta EL/M-2207/2208 air & surface search radar; Selenia Orion RTN-10X fire-control radar
- Electronic warfare & decoys: 1 × 45-tube, 4-6 × 24-tubes and 4 single chaff rocket launchers; Elisra NS-9003/9005 RWR
- Armament: 2-4 × RGM-84 Harpoon SSMs; and; 4 × Gabriel II SSMs; OR; 6 × Gabriel II SSMs; 1 × 20 mm Phalanx CIWS; and; 1 × OTO Melara 76 mm naval gun; OR; 2 × OTO Melara 76 mm naval gun; 2 × Oerlikon 20 mm cannon

The Sa'ar 4 or Reshef class were a series of fast attack craft built based on Israeli Navy designs grounded in accumulated experience derived in the operation of "Cherbourg" (Sa'ar 1, Sa'ar 2, and Sa'ar 3) classes. Thirteen were built at the Israel Shipyards, ten for the Israeli Navy and three for the South African Navy. Another six were built for the South African Navy in South Africa with Israeli assistance.

Sa'ar 4 boats' first battle engagements occurred in the October 1973 Yom Kippur War when two Sa'ar 4 boats, INS Reshef and INS Keshet, engaged Egyptian and Syrian ships and coastal targets. Israel had sold most of its Sa'ar 4 boats to other navies, but INS Nitzachon and INS Atzmaut remained in active Israeli Navy service until 2014.

== Variants ==
=== Israel ===
Ten Sa'ar 4-class boats were built for the Israeli Navy. As of 2013 only two remain in service. Three were disassembled, with systems taken for use in the construction of Sa'ar 4.5-class vessels. Three vessels and one hull stripped of systems were sold to Chile. Two vessels were sold to Sri Lanka.

Vessel name	Meaning	History	Fate	Status
INS Reshef	Spark	Launched in 1973. Commissioned in February 1973.	Sold to Chile in 1997 as LM-34 Angamos.	Active (Chile)
INS Keshet	Bow	Launched in 1973. Commissioned on August 23, 1973.	Sold to Chile in 1980 as LM-31 Chipana.	Active (Chile)
INS Romach	Lance	Launched in 1974.	Sold to Chile in 1979 as LM-30 Casma.	Active (Chile)
INS Kidon	Javelin	Launched in 1974.	Disassembled. Various systems reassembled atop Sa'ar 4.5 hull in 1994. The old hull sunk as an underwater memorial.	Retired
INS Tarshish	Tarshish	Launched in 1975.	Disassembled. Some systems reassembled atop Sa'ar 4.5 hull in 1995. The old hull sold to Chile in 1997 as LM-35 Papudo.	In 1998 cannibalized for spares Chilean Navy
INS Yaffo	Jaffa	Launched in 1975.	Disassembled. Various systems reassembled atop new Sa'ar 4.5 hull in 1998.	Retired
INS Nitzachon	Victory	Launched on 10 July 1978. Commissioned in September 1978.	Redirected to anti-submarine warfare. Retired 15 January 2014	Retired
INS Atzmaut	Independence	Launched on 3 December 1978. Commissioned in February 1979.	Redirected to anti-submarine warfare. Retired 5 March 2014	Sunk in July 2016, by 2 Harpoon (missile)s - launched by INS Hetz and INS Herev, in missile test conducted by the 3rd Flotilla.
INS Moledet	Homeland	Launched in 1979.	Redirected to anti-submarine warfare. Sold to Sri Lanka in 2000 as SLNS Suranimala.	Sold
INS Komemiyut	Sovereignty	Launched in 1980.	Redirected to anti-submarine warfare. Sold to Sri Lanka in 2000 as SLNS Nandimitra.	Sold

=== South Africa ===
The Warrior-class strike craft (formerly designated Minister class) in service with the South African Navy are modified Sa'ar 4 (Reshef-class) fast attack craft. In 1974, a contract was signed with Israeli Military Industries for the construction of three of the modified Reshef class vessels at the Haifa facility of Israeli Shipyards. A further three were built immediately after at the Sandock Austral shipyard in Durban, South Africa, with three more being built at the same facility several years later. The imposition of the international embargo on the sale of arms to South Africa on 4 November 1977 forced the project to be carried out under a cloak of security. The South African variants were fitted with Gabriel missiles, known in South Africa as 'Scorpion' missiles, and had two OTO Melara 76 mm guns instead of a single one with a Phalanx CIWS.

=== Chile ===
In 1979, the Chilean Navy purchased its first Sa'ar 4, followed by a second in 1980 and a final two boats in 1997. Papudo (ex INS Tarshish) was purchased with several missing systems and due to budgetary constraints was retired in 1998, only a year after entering service. All Sa'ar 4s in service with the Chilean Navy are armed with two OTO Melara 76 mm guns, eight Gabriel missile launchers and two Oerlikon 20 mm cannon with the exception of Angamos which was modernized in 2013 replacing four of the Gabriel missile launchers with four Exocet MM40 launchers. Three Sa'ar 4s remain in service as of 2020.

=== Sri Lanka ===
In 2000, two of the Israeli boats were sold to the Sri Lankan Navy, forming the Nandimithra class. It is not certain if these boats retain the Harpoon missile capability, however it is known that these boats retained their Gabriel missile capability.

SLNS Nandhimitra, a Saar-4 corvette, along with SLNS Sagara, a Vikram-class offshore patrol vessel participated at the International Fleet Review 2026 held at Visakapatanam, India on 18 February 2026 and Exercise MILAN held between 19–21 February. The ships departed Sri Lanka on 11 February and reached Visakhapatnam on 16 February. The same ship also conducted a Passage Exercise (PASSEX) with the 1st Training Squadron (1TS) of the Indian Navy during their visit to Sri Lanka in late October 2026.

== See also ==
- Sa'ar 5-class corvette
- Israeli Sea Corps
- Tunis Raid
