= INS Sufa =

Set index for ships of the same name

INS Sufa may refer to one of the following ships of the Israeli Navy:

- INS Sufa (1969), a Sa'ar 3-class missile boat, command vessel of the Cherbourg Project.
- INS Sufa (2003), a Sa'ar 4.5-class missile boat, second ship of the Israeli Navy of this name.
