= Gabriel (missile) =

Israeli-made anti-ship missile

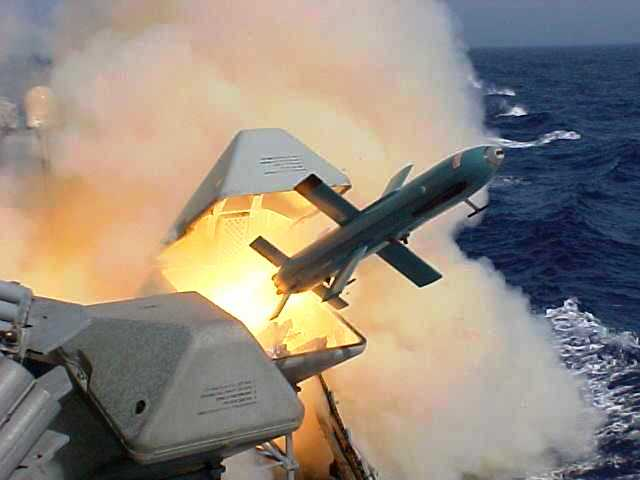
- An IAI Gabriel anti-ship missile
- Type: Anti-ship missile
- Place of origin: Israel

Service history
- In service: 1970
- Used by: See operators
- Wars: Yom Kippur War

Production history
- Manufacturer: Israel Aerospace Industries
- Unit cost: US$5 million per missile (Gabriel V / Blue Spear)
- Variants: developed from Luz (missile)

Specifications
- Mass: Mark I: 430 kg (950 lb); Mark II: 522 kg (1,151 lb); Mark III: 560 kg (1,230 lb); Mark III A/S: 590 kg (1,300 lb); Mark IV: 960 kg (2,120 lb); Mark V: 1,250 kg (2,760 lb)
- Length: Mark I: 3.35 m (11.0 ft); Mark II: 3.36 m (11.0 ft); Mark III: 3.75 m (12.3 ft); Mark III A/S: 3.78 m (12.4 ft); Mark IV: 4.7 m (15 ft); Mark V: 5.5 m (18 ft)
- Diameter: Mark I/ II /III / IIIA/S: 330 mm (13 in); Mark IV: 440 mm (17 in)
- Wingspan: Mark I / II:1.35 m (4 ft 5 in); Mark III:1.32 m (4 ft 4 in); Mark IIIA/S1.08 m (3 ft 7 in); Mark IV:1.60 m (5 ft 3 in)
- Warhead: Mark II: 100 kg (220 lb); Mark III / IIIA/S: 150 kg (330 lb); Mark IV: 240 kg (530 lb)
- Operational range: Mark I: 20 km (12 mi); Mark II:6–36 km (3.7–22.4 mi); Mark III:36 km (22 mi); Mark IIIA/S:60 km (37 mi); Mark IV:200 km (120 mi); Mark V/Blue Spear/Sea Serpent:400 km (250 mi)
- Flight altitude: 2.5 m (8 ft 2 in)
- Maximum speed: Gabriel V / Blue Spear / Sea Serpent: Mach 0.85 (high-subsonic)
- Guidance system: Mark I / II:Semi-Active Radar; Mark III / IIIA/S / IV: Active Radar, Mark V/ Blue Spear/ Sea Serpent: Inertial Navigation System (INS), Global Positioning System GPS, Active Radar Seeker, Two-way Data Link.
- Launch platform: Mark I-V: naval ships; Blue Spear: naval ships, Scania 6x6 or 8x8 truck-mounted.

Gabriel is a family of sea skimming anti-ship missiles manufactured by Israel Aerospace Industries (IAI). The initial variant of the missile was developed in the 1960s in response to the needs of the Israeli Navy which first deployed it in 1970. Since then, variants have been exported to navies around the world. The latest variant, the Gabriel V, is in use by the Finnish and Israeli navies as of 2020.

== Origin ==
On October 21, 1967, four Styx missiles sank the destroyer INS Eilat, which was patrolling along the northern shores of the Sinai. Forty-seven Israeli sailors and officers were killed or went missing in action and 100 were injured. The loss of the ship prompted the Israeli Navy to ask Israel Aerospace Industries to accelerate the development of an anti-ship missile, which had begun in 1958 with the Luz (or Lutz) program.

== Development ==
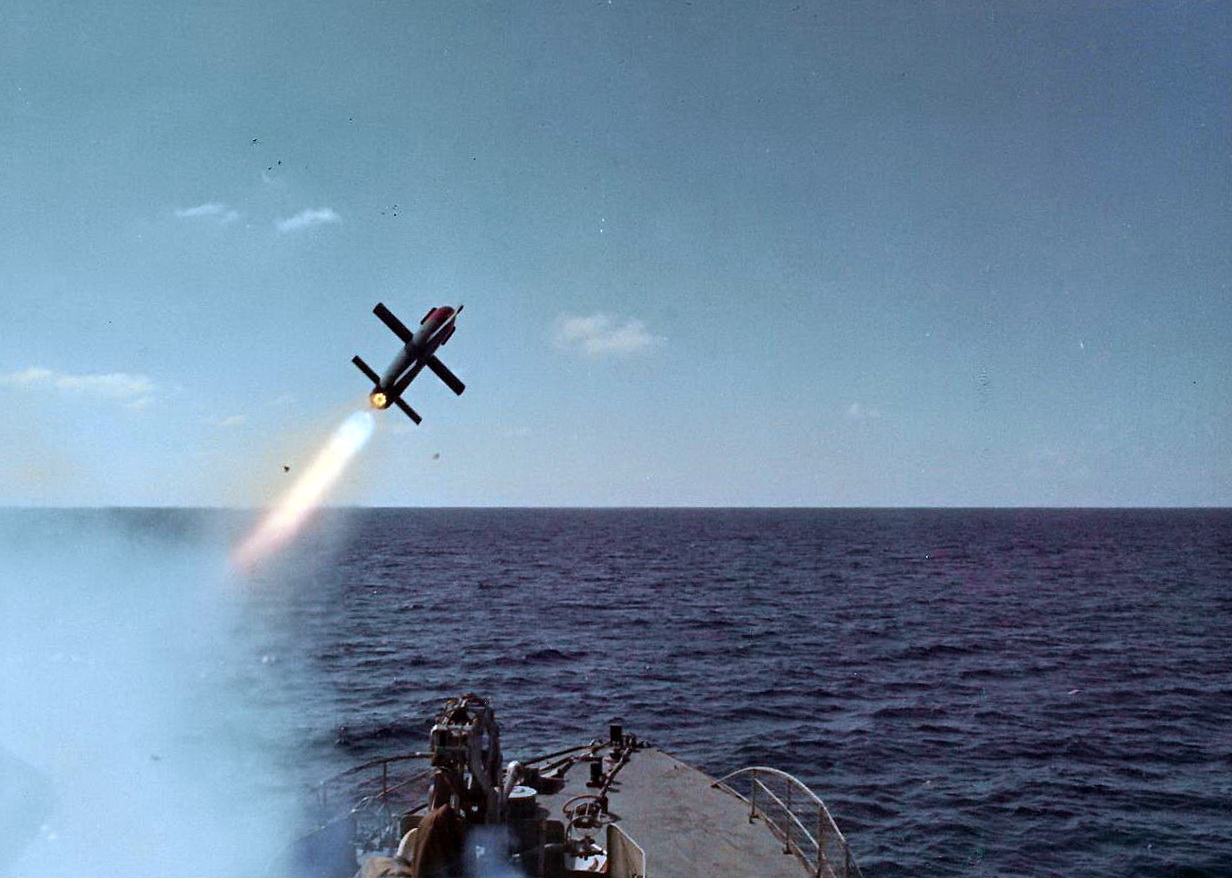
Testing of the Gabriel II missile from Sa'ar 2-class ship, 1969

Faced with Rafael Advanced Defense Systems's anxiety to develop a new guidance system, Shlomo Erell asked Israel Aerospace Industries to take over the program by recruiting Ori Even-Tov, a former Rafael engineer. Even-Tov suggested dropping the guidance joystick approach used by the Luz, and instead proposed the development of an autonomous guidance system which would allow the missile to seek its objective, even in bad weather or bad visibility. He further proposed using an altimeter, allowing the missile to fly some meters over the surface of the sea, making it difficult to detect and allowing it to hit the target just above the waterline. A radar installed on the ship had to guide the missile, while the altimeter would keep the missile in sea-skimming mode.

=== Gabriel Mk 1 ===
The development of the Gabriel for the Israeli Navy began in 1962, before being first shown to the public in 1970. It was touted to be the world's first operational sea-skimming missile, and saw extensive action during the Yom Kippur War. A batch of 50 was imported by the Republic of China Navy for evaluation and as the interim weapon for the three Allen M. Sumner-class destroyers upgraded with Gabriel Mk 2 missile system, and it is also the basis for the Taiwanese Hsiung Feng I missile.

=== Gabriel Mk 2 ===
The Gabriel Mk 2, an improved version of Gabriel, was created in 1972 and entered service in 1976. It was also built under license in South Africa under the name Skerpioen (Afrikaans for Scorpion). The Taiwanese Hsiung Feng I missile can be considered as a parallel development, being based on Gabriel Mk 1 but with similar improvements, and ordnances used by the two systems are interchangeable.

=== Gabriel III ===
Gabriel III and Gabriel III A/S were introduced in 1978 with major improvements. The air-launched Gabriel III A/S has a range of over 60 km. Both Gabriel III versions employ the widely used 'fire and forget' mode.

=== Gabriel IV ===
Developed in the early 1990s is related to the Gabriel Mk III but larger and with a turbojet engine for sustained flight. It is distinguishable from the Mk III because of its swept wings with cropped tip. Like the Mk III, it has 3 guidance modes: Fire and Forget, Fire and Update with data link, and Fire and command using Radar update

=== Gabriel V ===
Israel Aerospace Industries is reportedly working on a Gabriel V Advanced Naval Attack Missile, with an advanced active multi-spectral seeker designed for cluttered littoral environments. As of 2020, this variant is deployed by the Finnish and Israeli navies. Range is claimed to be more than 200 km to 400 km.

Successful test firing of the Gabriel V was conducted by the Israel Defense Forces on September 21, 2022.

=== Blue Spear ===
In 2020, Israel's IAI and Singapore's ST Engineering started a 50/50 joint venture company called Proteus Advanced Systems to develop, produce and market an improved Gabriel V variant called the Blue Spear missile system. The missile is produced in a factory in Singapore and has both sea and land attack capabilities with enhanced maneuverability for littoral and cluttered environments.

The warhead employs an active radar-homing seeker, accurate INS-based navigation capabilities, beyond-line-of-sight (BLOS) capability, two-way datalink for in-flight course correction or retargetting (("fire and update"), and a robust GPS system which is immune to GPS disruptions and maximal accuracy target acquisition. For land attack missions, the Blue Spear has a terrain-following capability without the need for INS / GPS satellites guidance, with terminal homing being aided by an active radar seeker. The system is equipped with a variety of deception means to achieve its mission and cope with the different battle-field challenges. ST Engineering's role in the Blue Spear's development includes the design, development and production of major subsystems like the booster motor and warhead.

An 8x8 truck-mounted variant was made for the Estonian Defence Forces was delivered in 2021. The missile has a hardened casing for the radar seeker, guidance system and warhead which would allow increased survivability against close-in weapon systems (CIWS) gun rounds and air-defence artillery. It has a maximum range of 290 km (flight profile not mentioned). The cost of each missile is about $5 million. On 13 May 2022, reports that Israel had consented for Estonia to give Ukraine one Blue Spear 5G SSM rocket were confirmed false.

As part of the class's mid-life upgrade from 2028, ST Engineering will install the Blue Spear missile on the Republic of Singapore Navy's six Formidable-class frigates as a replacement for the American Harpoon missile. Blue Spear has also been chosen for the Victory-class MRCV. Janes has reported that the locally produced Singaporean non-export model of the Blue Spear has a striking range of 320km. There could also be other variations to other specifications such as warhead size, electronics, speed, etc.

=== Sea Serpent ===
In 2021, IAI and Thales jointly marketed a variant of the Gabriel V/Blue Spear called Sea Serpent to the Royal Navy to replace its ageing Harpoon missile system. At DSEI 2021, IAI revealed that Sea Serpent was developed in parallel with Blue Spear and based on the Gabriel V missile system and/or older variants. IAI also revealed that Sea Serpent has a low profile mode or sea skimming range of greater than 290 km, corresponding with the overall Blue Spear/Gabriel V's range of up to 400 km, depending on flight profile.

=== Older models ===
Older models of the Gabriel are still used by Chile (Sa'ar 4 with Gabriel II), Israel (Sa'ar 4.5 with Gabriel II), Mexico (Sa'ar 4.5 with Gabriel II), Sri Lanka (Sa'ar 4 with Gabriel II) and Thailand (FPB-45 with Gabriel I).

== Operational history ==
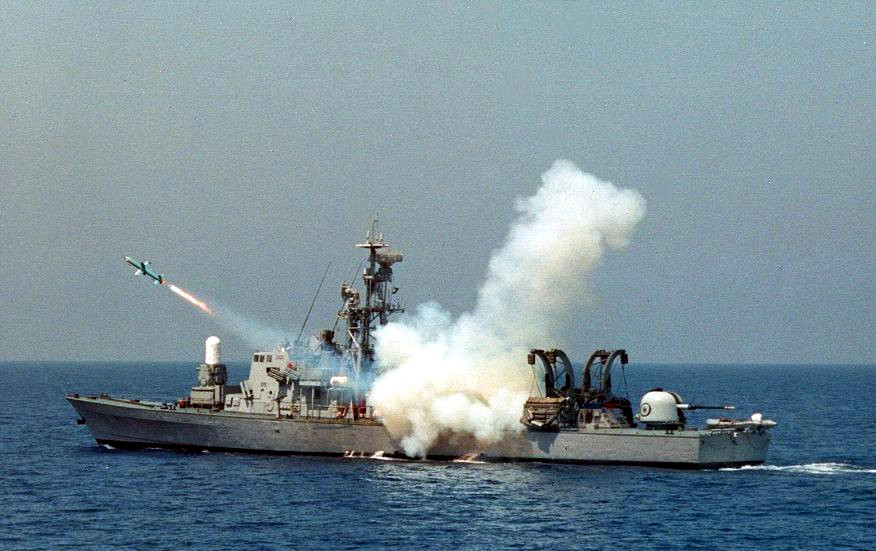
A Sa'ar 4-class ship launches the Gabriel missile

During the Yom Kippur War the Gabriel I was used for the first time during the Battle of Latakia. Israeli missile boats armed with Gabriel Mk 1 missiles were credited with defeating Syrian ships armed with the Soviet-made P-15 Termit (SS-N-2 Styx) missile. Even though the Styx missile had a longer range, the Gabriel's reliability and flexibility of handling contributed to the Israeli victory. It is known that the Syrians shot missile salvos at the charging Israeli vessels but missed due to the Israeli electronic countermeasure technology of the time. When they were in range, the Israeli boats launched their Gabriel missiles, and sank all but one Syrian Osa-class ship, which was later sunk by cannon fire. After defeating the Syrian Navy (surviving Syrian ships stayed in port) the Israeli missile boats defeated the Egyptian navy as well, achieving naval supremacy for the remainder of the war.

=== Details ===
During the Yom Kippur War in 1973, the Styx was shown to be far less effective than previously believed. From October 6 to October 12, 54 missiles were fired to no effect, according to Western sources. The aforementioned Russian sources however, claim that a total of seven ships were sunk - all small vessels such as trawlers, patrol boats, and missile boats. But the Russian specialists agreed with their Western counterparts that the overall results were unsatisfying, especially considering that seven Egyptian and Syrian vessels were sunk after being hit by Israeli Gabriel Mk.1 anti-ship missiles. This last figure is commonly recognized by specialists in both the West and East.

The first such encounter took place during the night of October 6 to 7, 1973, near Latakia on the Syrian coast. Israeli forces used helicopters flying slowly at very low altitude, effectively simulating naval targets. No Israeli ship was hit by the large salvo of P-15s subsequently fired by the Syrians, who themselves lost the T-43-class trawler Jarmuk and three torpedo boats to Israeli Gabriel missiles. The Syrian missile boats withdrew successfully, but all of their missiles missed the Israeli helicopters, which had climbed to break the missile radars' locks. On the same night, a similar trick with helicopters was repeated against Egyptian ships north of the Sinai Peninsula. Yet another encounter took place near Latakia on the night of October 10–11. This time, the missile exchange between Israeli and Syrian missile boats took place without the use of helicopters, and Israeli ships relied on chaff. The Syrian vessels maneuvered outside their harbor among the anchored merchant ships. Two of the warships were sunk by Gabriel missiles, which also hit two neutral ships, the Greek Tsimentaros and the Japanese Yamashuro Maru. According to Israeli sources, the use of chaff saved all of its vessels. The following night, the helicopter maneuver was again successfully used during an encounter near Tartus off the Syrian coast. No Israeli ship was hit by a salvo of P-15s fired by Syrian missile boats. On the Syrian side, two Komar-class vessels were sunk by Gabriel missiles, and also the Soviet merchant ship Ilya Mechnikov was hit. On the same night, a similar encounter took place off the coast of Port Said.

== Operators ==
=== Current operators ===
Azerbaijan

- Azerbaijan Navy

Ecuador

- Ecuadorian Navy

Eritrea

- Eritrean Navy

Estonia

- Estonian Navy (Blue Spear 5G SSM)

Finland

- Finnish Navy from 2019 onwards (Gabriel V)

Israel

- Israeli Navy

Kenya

- Kenyan Navy

Mexico

- Mexican Navy

Singapore

- Republic of Singapore Navy

Sri Lanka

- Sri Lankan Navy

=== Former operators ===
South Africa

- South African Navy

Taiwan

- Republic of China Navy (Mk 2, reduced to reserve status due to service entry of the similar Hsiung Feng I missile and decommissioned in early 1990s)

Thailand

- Royal Thai Navy

Chilean Navy, on SAAR 3 and 4 class ships.

== See also ==
- 3M24 – (Russia)
- Exocet – (France)
- Qader – (Iran)
- SOM – (Turkey)
- Noor ASCM – (Iran)
- Zafar – (Iran)
- Khalij Fars – (Iran)
- YJ-83 – (China)
