= ELTA Systems =

Israeli defense company

ELTA Systems Ltd
- Industry: Aerospace & Defense
- Founded: September 1, 1967; 59 years ago
- Headquarters: Ashdod, Israel
- Area served: Worldwide
- Key people: Dror Bar (CEO)
- Products: Air Surveillance & Air Defense Radars, Special mission aircraft (CAEW, ISTAR), Intelligence systems (SIGINT, ELINT, COMINT), Communication Systems, Electronic Warfare, EW, Maritime Systems, HLS, Robotic & Autonomous Systems, Space Systems, CyberSecurity
- Revenue: ▲US$ 2.2 billion (2025)
- Owner: Government of Israel
- Number of employees: 4,700 (2025)
- Parent: Israel Aerospace Industries
- Website: Official site

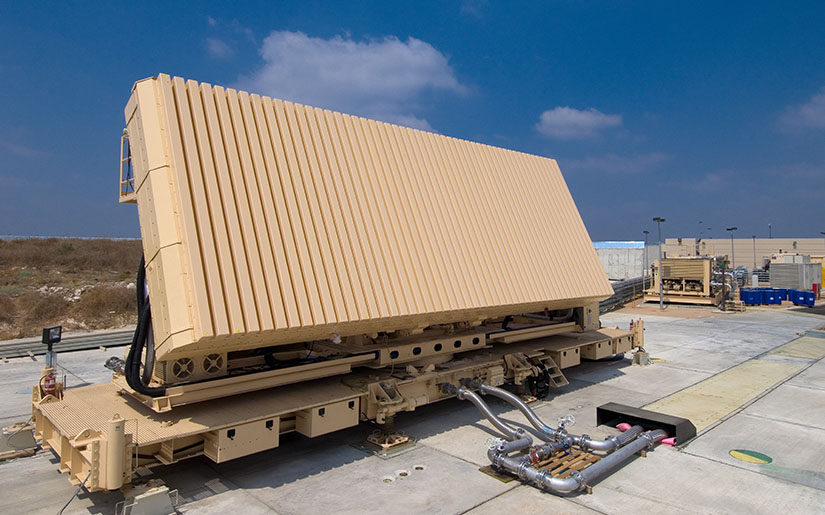
The ELTA System's ELM 2080 Radar named Green-Pine, for long-range ballistic missile detection - is a part of the Arrow Weapon System

ELTA Systems Ltd (ELTA) is an Israeli defense technology company specializing in designing, developing, and producing advanced electronic systems and sensors. ELTA is a group and subsidiary of the government-owned Israel Aerospace Industries (IAI), and its product portfolio encompassing radars, ELINT, COMINT, special mission aircraft, electronic warfare, communications, autonomous ground vehicles, underwater systems and cybersecurity defense systems.

== Company History ==
ELTA's Sales in 2025 reached $2,215 million, of which approximately 75% were generated by export orders and 25% domestically. At the end of 2025, the company order book reached $7.4 Billion.
