= Elisra =

Israeli manufacturer

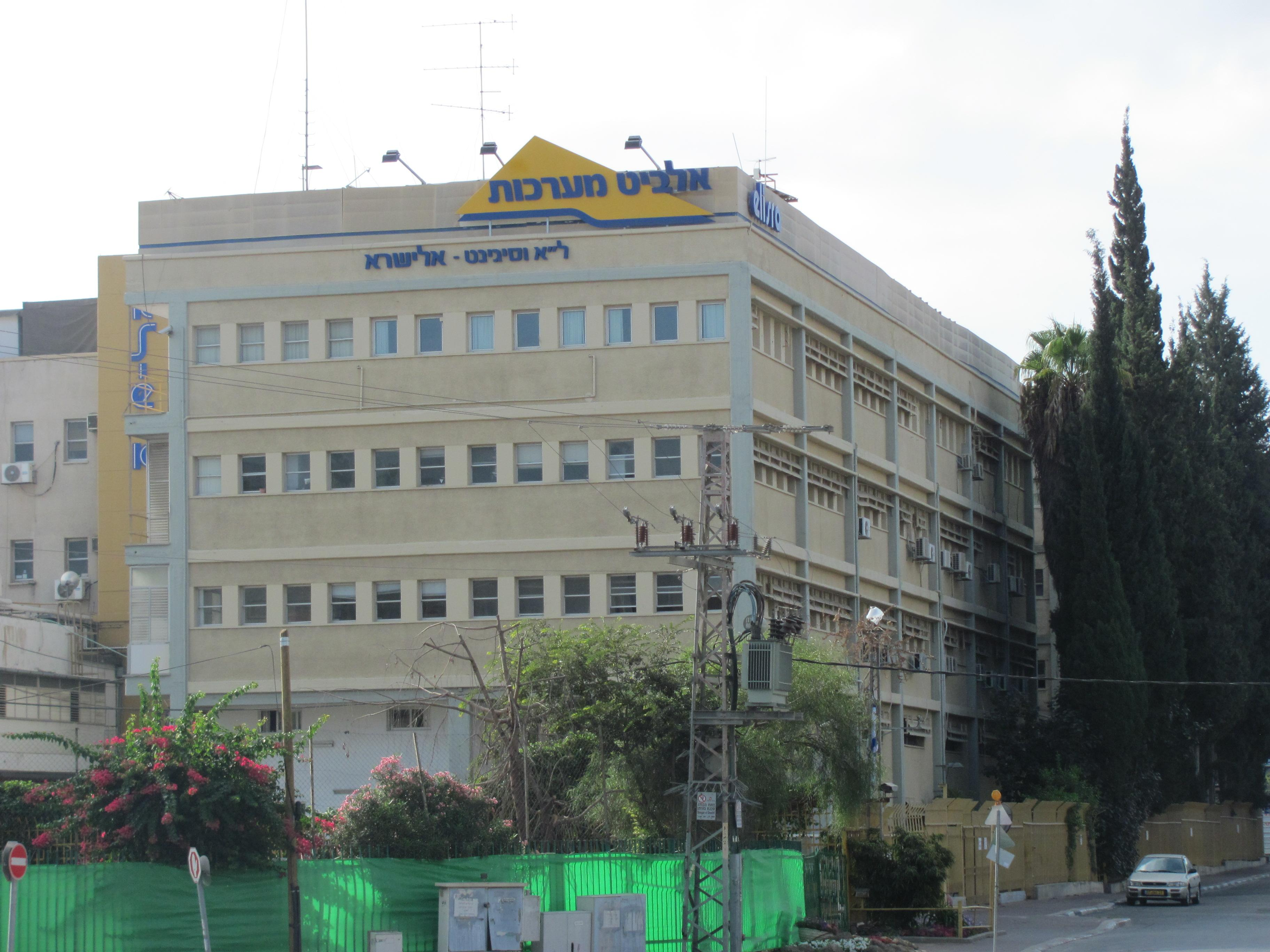
- Elisra building in Bnei Brak
- Formerly: American Electronics Laboratories (AEL) Industries Inc.
- Company type: Subsidiary
- Industry: Defense systems
- Founded: Lansdale, Pennsylvania, United States 1967
- Founder: Dr. Leon Riebman
- Headquarters: Holon, Israel
- Key people: Itzchak Gat
- Number of employees: 1,400
- Parent: Elbit Systems
- Website: http://www.elisra.com

Elisra Group is an Israeli manufacturer of high-tech electronic devices, mainly but not exclusively for military use. It makes equipment for electronic communication and surveillance, missile tracking and controlling systems, radar and lidar equipment. The group is composed of three companies: Elisra Electronic Systems, Tadiran Electronic Systems Ltd. and Tadiran Spectralink Ltd.

== History ==
Previously, Elisra was owned 70% by Elbit Systems and 30% by Israel Aerospace Industries (IAI); however, Elbit later acquired IAI's share and Elisra is now a wholly owned subsidiary of Elbit.

Elisra Electronic Systems supplies missile warning systems, active jammer systems, laser and IR detection systems for several kinds of aircraft and ground vessels of the Israel Defense Forces (IDF). Tadiran Electronic Systems manufactured the Tadiran Mastiff reconnaissance UAV, used by the IDF during the 1982 Lebanon War.
