= INS Nitzachon =

Sa'ar 6-class corvette

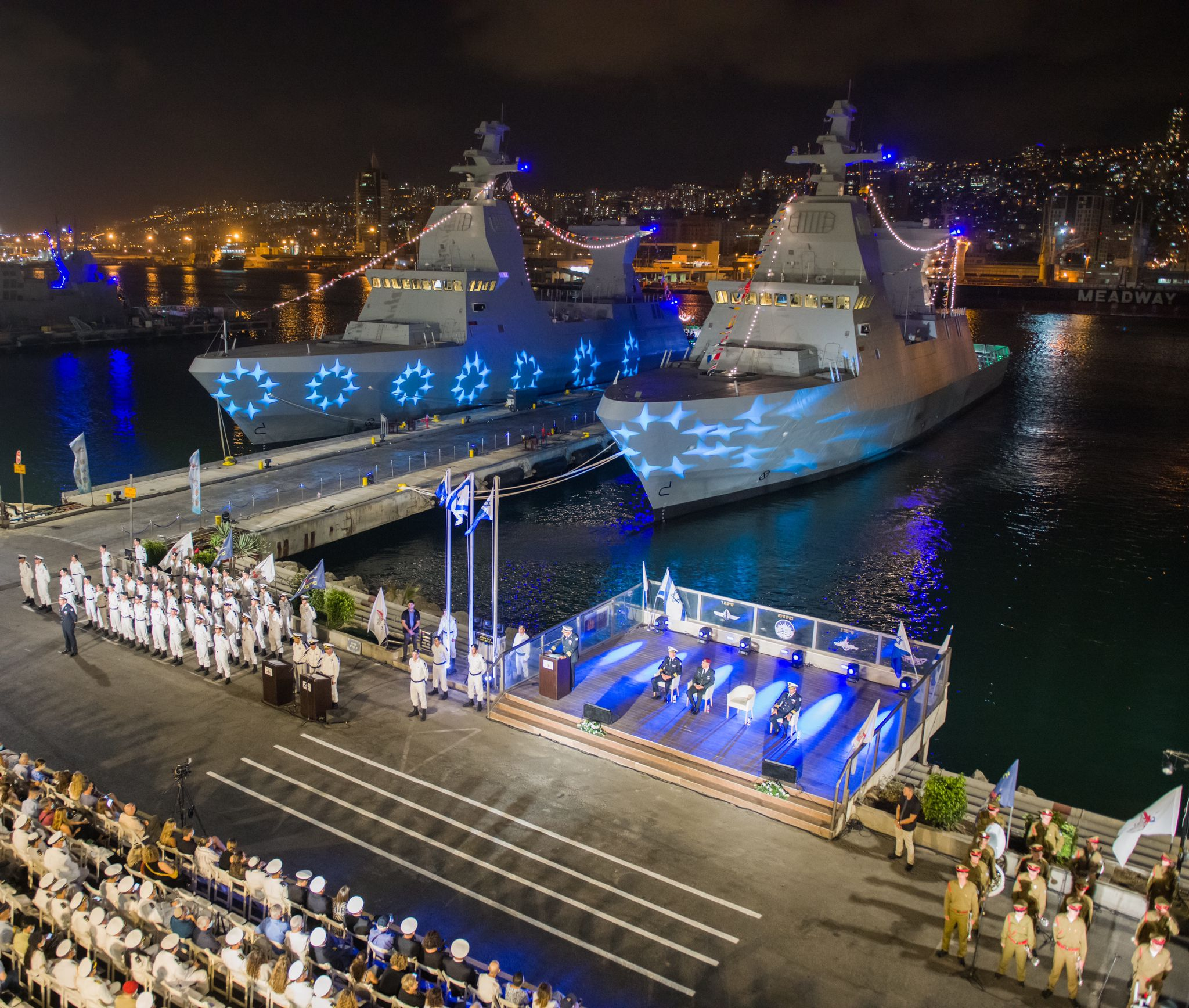
- INS Nitzachon in August 2021

History

Israel
- Name: Nitzachon; (ניצחון)
- Namesake: Nitzachon
- Ordered: May 2015
- Builder: German Naval Yards; ThyssenKrupp
- Laid down: 2018
- Launched: 2019
- Acquired: 30 August 2021
- Recommissioned: Expected, November 2021
- Status: Active
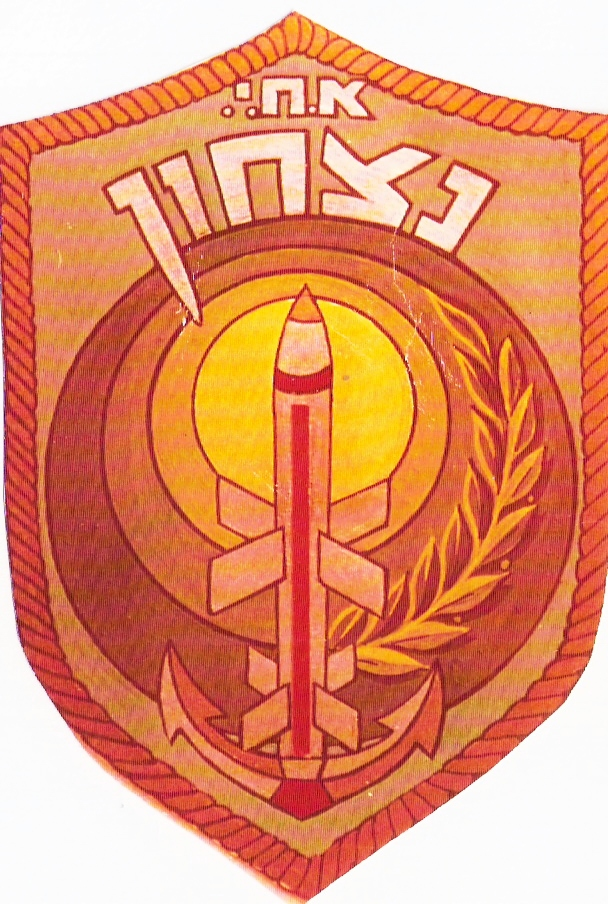
- Badge

General characteristics
- Class & type: Sa'ar 6-class corvette
- Displacement: 1,900 long tons (1,900 t) at full load
- Length: 90 m (295 ft 3 in)
- Range: 4,000 km (2,200 nmi; 2,500 mi)
- Sensors & processing systems: EL/M-2248 MF-STAR AESA radar
- Armament: 1 × Oto Melara 76 mm main gun; 2 × Typhoon Weapon Stations; 16 vertical launch cells for Barak MX LR surface-to-air missiles; 40 vertical launch cells for C-Dome point defense system; 16 Gabriel V anti-ship missile; 2 × 324 mm (12.8 in) torpedo launchers; 1 MH-60 Seahawk multi mission helicopter

INS Nitzachon is a Sa'ar 6-class corvette of the Israeli Navy's Shayetet 3 Flotilla. It is the fourth ship of its class.

== Development and design ==
The Sa'ar 6-class corvettes' design will be based on the German Braunschweig-class corvette, but with engineering changes to accommodate Israeli-built sensors and missiles such as the naval Iron Dome system. Elbit Systems has been awarded the contract to design and build the electronic warfare (EW) suites for the ships.

The Sa'ar 6-class vessels have a displacement of almost 1,900 tons at full load and is 90 m (295 ft 3 in) long. They are armed with an Oto Melara 76 mm main gun, two Typhoon Weapon Stations, 16 vertical launch cells for Barak MX LR surface-to-air missiles, 40 cells for the C-Dome point defense system, 16 anti-ship missiles Gabriel V, the EL/M-2248 MF-STAR AESA radar, and two 324 mm (12.8 in) torpedo launchers. They have hangar space and a platform able to accommodate a medium class SH-60-type helicopter.

== Construction and career ==
She was launched at German Naval Yards and ThyssenKrupp in Kiel. She will be expected to be commissioned over to Israeli Navy in November 2021. The ship was delivered to the Israeli Navy in August 2021 and is to be fitted with Israeli weapons and radar in Israel. Her maiden voyage from Kiel to Haifa took 12 days and being the last ship of its class to arrive, she was joined aboard by the Navy’s top officers for the final leg arriving into Haifa on the morning of the 30th of August 2021 in parade formation joined by most of the Israeli Navy’s fleet.

== Gallery ==
INS Atzmaut and INS Nitzachon in August 2021
