= INS Romach =

INS Romach is the name of the following ships of the Israeli Navy:

- INS Romach (1974), sold to Chile in 1979, renamed Casma
- INS Romach (1981), in active service
