= INS Oz =

Sa'ar-class corvette

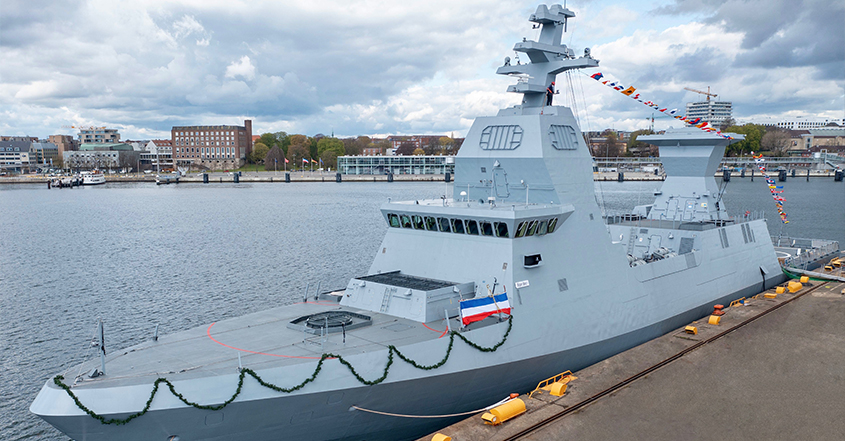
- INS Oz in May 2021

History

Israel
- Name: Oz; (עוז)
- Namesake: Oz
- Ordered: May 2015
- Builder: German Naval Yards; ThyssenKrupp
- Launched: 24 August 2019
- Acquired: 4 May 2021
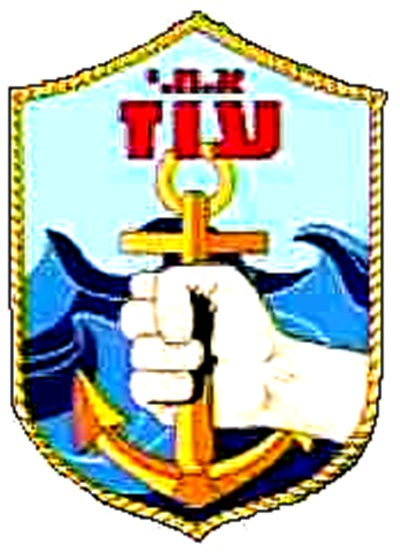
- Badge

General characteristics
- Class & type: Sa'ar 6-class corvette
- Displacement: 1,900 long tons (1,900 t) at full load
- Length: 90 m (295 ft 3 in)
- Range: 4,000 nmi (7,400 km; 4,600 mi)
- Sensors & processing systems: EL/M-2248 MF-STAR AESA radar
- Armament: 1 × Oto Melara 76 mm main gun; 2 × Typhoon Weapon Stations; 16 vertical launch cells for Barak MX LR surface-to-air missiles; 40 vertical launch cells for C-Dome point defense system; 16 Gabriel V anti ship missile; 2 × 324 mm (12.8 in) torpedo launchers; 1 MH-60 Seahawk multi mission helicopter

INS Oz is a Sa'ar 6-class corvette of the Israeli Navy's Shayetet 3 Flotilla. She is the second ship of her class.

== Development and design ==
The Sa'ar 6-class corvettes' design is loosely based on the German Braunschweig-class corvette, but with engineering changes to accommodate Israeli-built sensors and missiles such as the naval Iron Dome system. Elbit Systems has been awarded the contract to design and build the electronic warfare (EW) suites for the ships.

The Sa'ar 6-class vessels have a displacement of almost 1,900 tons at full load and are 90 m (295 ft 3 in) long. They are armed with an Oto Melara 76 mm main gun, two Typhoon Weapon Stations, 16 vertical launch cells for Barak MX LR surface-to-air missiles, 40 cells for the C-Dome point defense system, 16 anti-ship missiles Gabriel V, the EL/M-2248 MF-STAR AESA radar, and two 324 mm (12.8 in) torpedo launchers. They have hangar space and a platform able to accommodate a medium class SH-60-type helicopter.

== Construction and career ==
She was launched on 24 August 2019 at German Naval Yards and ThyssenKrupp in Kiel. She was handed over to Israeli Navy on 4 May 2021. In Haifa in September 2022, the vessel's 76/62 rapid-fire main gun was ceremonially accepted for her and her sister ship Magen. Later in the month a Gabriel V anti-ship missile was successfully test-fired from the corvette.

== Gallery ==
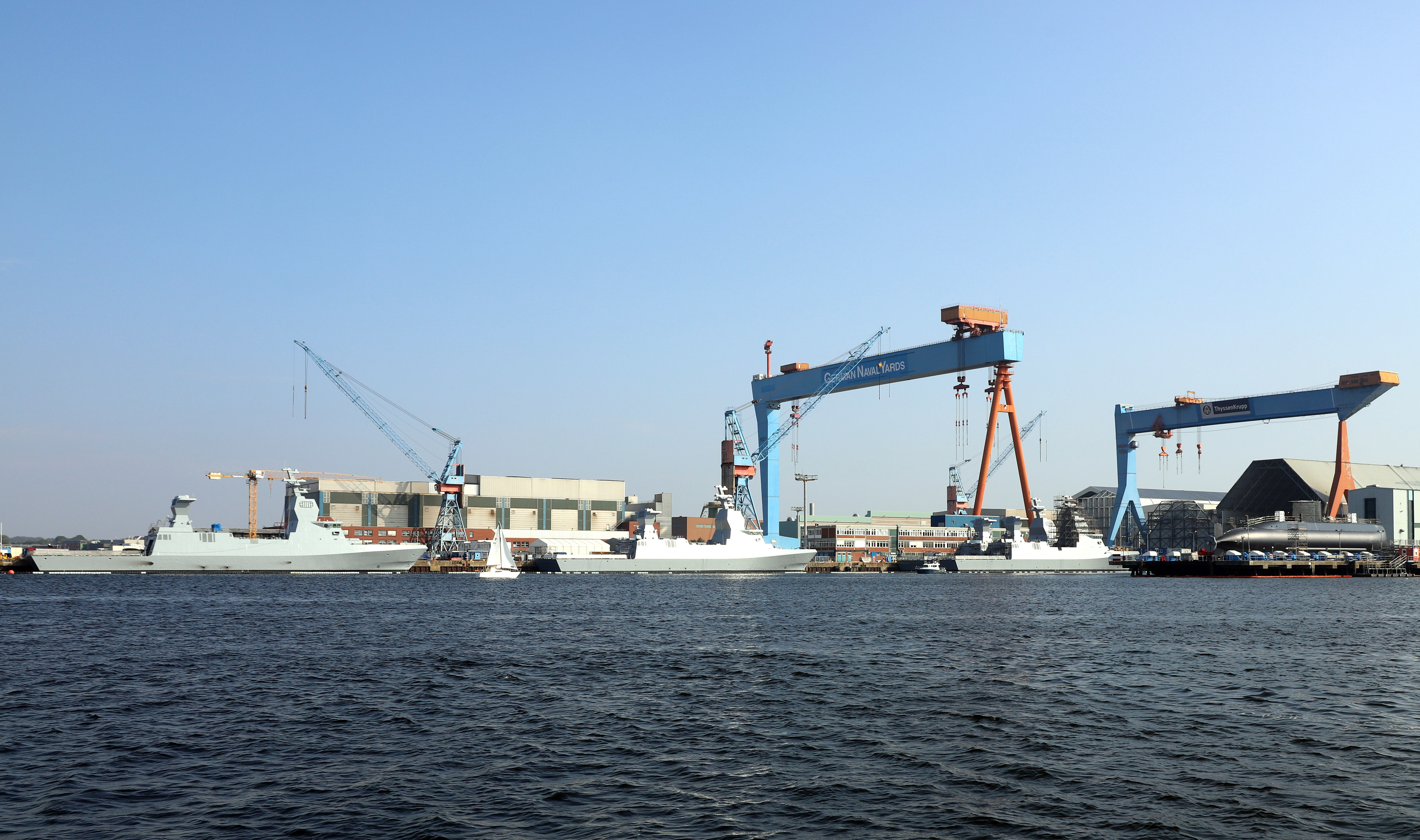
INS Magen, INS Oz and INS Atzmaut on 23 September 2020.
