= INS Yaffo =

INS Yaffo has been borne by at least two ships of the Israeli Sea Corps:

- INS Yaffo (1955), the former British Z-class destroyer HMS Zodiac acquired in 1955 and stricken in 1972
- INS Yaffo (1998), a Sa'ar 4.5-class missile boat commissioned in 1998
