= Sa'ar 6-class corvette =

Class of Israeli Navy corvettes ordered in 2015

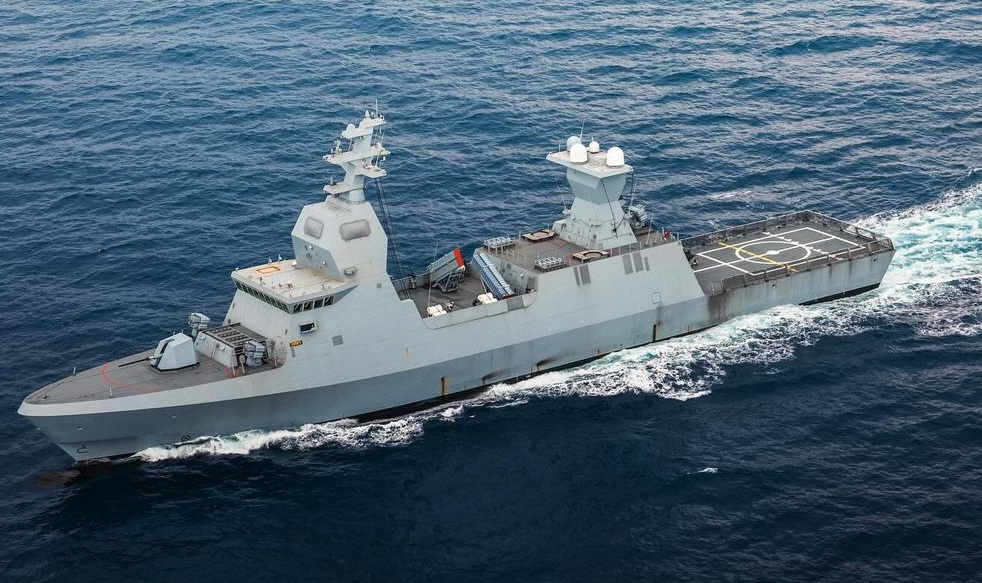
- A Sa'ar 6 corvette of the Israeli Navy

Class overview
- Name: Sa'ar 6 class
- Operators: Israeli Navy
- Preceded by: Sa'ar 5 class
- Cost: NI₪1.8 billion (US$557 million) for 4 ships (2015 est.)
- Built: 2018–2023
- In commission: 2023–present
- Completed: 4
- Active: 4

General characteristics
- Type: Corvette
- Displacement: 1,900 long tons (1,900 t) at full load
- Length: 90 m (295 ft 3 in)
- Range: 4,000 nmi (7,400 km; 4,600 mi)
- Complement: 70
- Crew: 70
- Sensors & processing systems: EL/M-2248 MF-STAR AESA radar
- Electronic warfare & decoys: C-GEM RF Active Decoy
- Armament: 1 × Oto Melara 76 mm main gun; 2 × Typhoon Weapon Stations; 16 vertical launch cells for Barak MX LR surface-to-air missiles; 40 launch cells for C-Dome point defense system; 8 Gabriel V anti-ship missile; 2 × 324 mm (12.76 in) torpedo launchers; 1 MH-60 Seahawk multi-mission helicopter

The Sa'ar 6-class corvette is a series of four German-made corvettes ordered for the Israeli Navy in May 2015 and entering service from 2020 onwards. These are operated by Shayetet 3 flotilla.

== Development ==
The ships' design is loosely based on the German Braunschweig-class corvette, but with engineering changes to accommodate Israeli-built sensors and missiles such as the Barak 8 and the naval Iron Dome system. Elbit Systems has been awarded the contract to design and build the electronic warfare (EW) suites for the ships.

All four vessels were constructed in Germany in a joint project by German Naval Yards Holdings and TKMS. The first of the class was scheduled to be delivered in 2020. Construction cost was estimated at NIS 1.8 billion Israeli new shekel (NIS) or roughly 430 million Euros ($480 million). Israel will pay for two thirds of the cost and the German Government will subsidize a third of the corvettes' construction costs, as with the Dolphin-class submarines.

== Missions ==
The Lebanese Hezbollah group alleges that Israel's gas fields lie in Lebanese waters. It has threatened to target Israeli gas platforms. An Israeli-owned ship reportedly came under missile fire repeatedly near the United Arab Emirates. The ship was en route to the UAE from Kuwait, according to Channel 12 news.

The Sa'ar 6 has been adopted for maritime protection, anti-shipping and prevent threats in the Israeli exclusive economic zone (EEZ). The Sa'ar 6 is also used to defend Israeli shipping lanes in the Mediterranean to import more than 90 percent of goods for Israel. One of their roles will be to protect natural gas platforms in the Mediterranean Sea against possible seaborne terrorism attacks or rocket threats.

== Characteristics ==
The Sa'ar 6 has a displacement of almost 1,900 tons at full load and is 90 m (295 ft 3 in) long. It is armed with an Oto Melara 76 mm main gun, two Typhoon Weapon Stations, 16 vertical launch cells for Barak MX LR surface-to-air missiles, 40 cells for the C-Dome point defense system, up to 16 anti-ship missiles Gabriel V, the EL/M-2248 MF-STAR AESA radar, and two 324 mm (12.8 in) torpedo launchers. It has hangar space and a platform able to accommodate a medium class SH-60-type helicopter.

Israel received the first of four Sa'ar 6-class corvettes, INS Magen, on 11 December 2020; Thyssen Krupp Marine Systems officially handed over the second corvette, INS Oz, on 4 May 2021. On July 27, 2021, the final two ships, INS Atzmaut and INS Nitzachon, were also delivered to the Israeli Navy by the builder. They were to be equipped with radar and weapon systems by the Israeli Navy after their arrival in Israel. In Haifa in September 2022, the vessel's 76/62 rapid-fire main gun was ceremonially accepted for the first two ships of the class.

== Ships of class ==
Sa'ar 6-class corvette
Name	Builders	Laid down	Launched	Commissioned	Status
Magen (Defender/Shield)	German Naval Yards Holdings & ThyssenKrupp	7 February 2018	12 May 2019	11 November 2020	Active
Oz (Courage)	German Naval Yards Holdings & ThyssenKrupp	February 2018	24 August 2019	4 May 2021	Active
Atzmaut (Independence)	German Naval Yards Holdings & ThyssenKrupp	2018	2019	23 April 2023	Active
Nitzachon (Victory)	German Naval Yards Holdings & ThyssenKrupp	2018	2019	12 December 2023	Active

== See also ==
- List of corvette classes in service

Equivalent modern corvettes

- Diponegoro-class – (Netherlands)
- Steregushchiy-class – (Russia)
- Kamorta-class – (India)
- Ada-class – (Turkey)
- Braunschweig-class – (Germany)
- Pohjanmaa-class – (Finland)
