= INS Keshet (1982) =

Israeli Sa'ar 4.5-class missile boat

History

Israel
- Name: Keshet
- Builder: Israel Shipyards Ltd.
- Launched: October 1982
- Commissioned: November 1982
- Decommissioned: October 2026
- Status: Retired
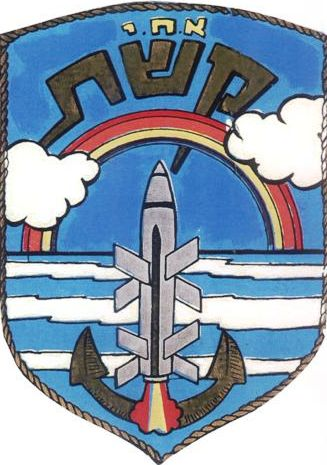
- Badge

General characteristics
- Class & type: Sa'ar 4.5-class missile boat
- Displacement: 488 tonnes (full load)
- Length: 61.7 m (202.43 ft)
- Beam: 7.6 m (24.93 ft)
- Draft: 2.5 m (8.20 ft)
- Propulsion: 4 MTU 16V 538 TB93 diesel engines, four shafts, total of 16,600 shp (12,400 kW)
- Speed: 31 knots (57 km/h)
- Range: 3,000 nautical miles (5,600 km) at 17 knots (31 km/h) 1,500 nautical miles (2,800 km) at 30 knots (56 km/h)
- Complement: 53 officers and crew
- Armament: 8 x RGM-84 Harpoon anti-ship missiles; 6 x Gabriel Mark II anti-ship missiles; 16 x Barak 1 surface-to-air missiles; 1 x OTO Melara 76 mm naval gun; 2 or 4 x 0.5 in (12.70 mm) caliber M2 Browning machine guns; 2 x 12.7 mm general-purpose machine guns; 1 x 20 mm Phalanx CIWS

INS Keshet was an Israeli missile boat of the Shayetet 3 Flotilla, one of ten Sa'ar 4.5-class missile boats. She was launched in 1982 by Israel Shipyards at the Port of Haifa. She has been a part of Israeli Navy since November 1982. INS Keshet retired in October 2026 after 44 years of service.

== Construction ==
Sa'ar 4.5-class missile boats are an enlarged version of the Sa'ar 4 class. New ships were longer and consequently they take an augmented armament.

INS Keshet was built at the Israel Shipyards in Port of Haifa. She was launched in October 1982.

== Dimensions and drive ==
The length of this unit is 61.7 metres (202 ft 5 in), the breadth is 7.6 metres (24 ft 11 in) and the draught is 2.5 metres (8 ft 2 in). She has a flush deck, short superstructure located in front of the midship and freeboard. The full load displacement is 488 tonnes.

The total power of engines is 16,000 horsepower (12,000 kW). Keshet is proppeled by four MTU 16V538 TB93 Diesel engines. The flank speed of her is 31 knots (57 km/h; 36 mph); the range is 3,000 nautical miles (5,600 km; 3,500 mi) at a speed of about 17 knots (31 km/h; 20 mph) and 1,500 nautical miles (2,800 km; 1,700 mi) at 30 knots (56 km/h; 35 mph).

== Armament ==
The primary armament is two quadruple launchers of American Harpoon anti-ship missiles, both allocated behind the superstructure. The missile is able to reach 130 km (81 mi), the speed is Mach 0.9 (1,100 km/h; 690 mph) and the weight of the warhead is 227 kg (500 lb). Behind them, there are six single launchers of Israeli Gabriel Mark II missiles with a 75 kg (165 lb) warhead and a range of about 36 km (22 mi). In service, the Israeli Navy set two 8-fold anti-aircraft Barak 1 launchers with the range of a projectile of 10 km (6.2 mi), making the armament identical to one in INS Hetz.

The secondary armament consists of single, dual-purpose gun OTO Melara 76 mm, allocated abaft in a gun turret. The weight of the projectile is 6 kg (13 lb), the range is 16 km (9.9 mi) and the rate of fire is 85 rounds per minute (RPM). The angle of elevation is 85°. There are also two single Oerlikon 20 mm cannon with a range of 2 km (1.2 mi) and rate of fire of 900 RPM and one double (or quadruple) station for M2 Browning machine guns. The bow is armed with close-in weapon system, Phalanx CIWS, with the rate of fire 3,000 RPM, and the range 1,500 m (1,600 yd).
