= C-GEM =

Shipborne RF active decoy

C-GEM is a shipborne RF active decoy developed by Rafael Advanced Defense Systems of Israel.

The decoy is used to protect vessels by luring anti-ship missiles with radar homing away from the protected ship. C-GEM has completed trials including live firing from Israeli Navy Sa'ar 6 corvettes.

C-GEM is also compatible to NATO SRBOC 130mm launchers
