= Shayetet 3 =

3rd Flotilla
- שייטת ספינות הטילים
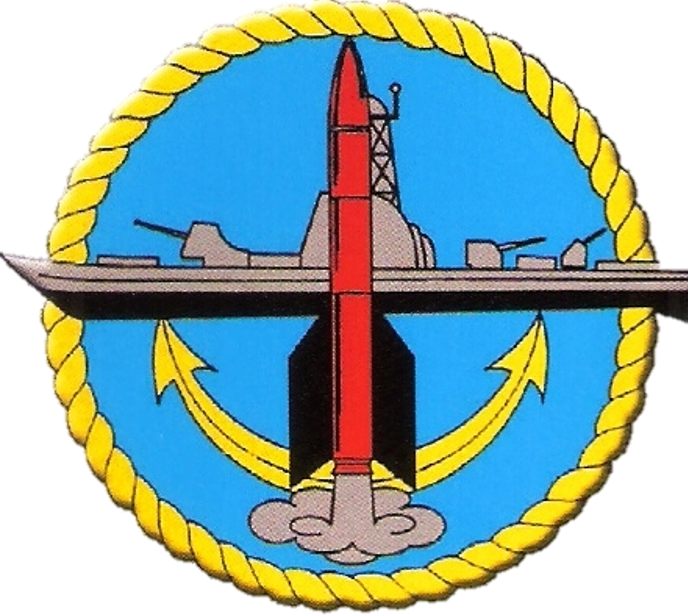
- Coat of arms of Shayetet 3
- Active: 1962-present
- Country: Israel
- Branch: Israeli Navy
- Type: Corvette and Missile boat Flotilla
- Size: 15 Ships and about 1,000 soldiers and officers
- Part of: Israeli Navy
- Garrison/HQ: Haifa naval base
- Nickname: Missile Ship Flotilla

Commanders
- Current commander: Colonel Eldad Borochovich

Insignia
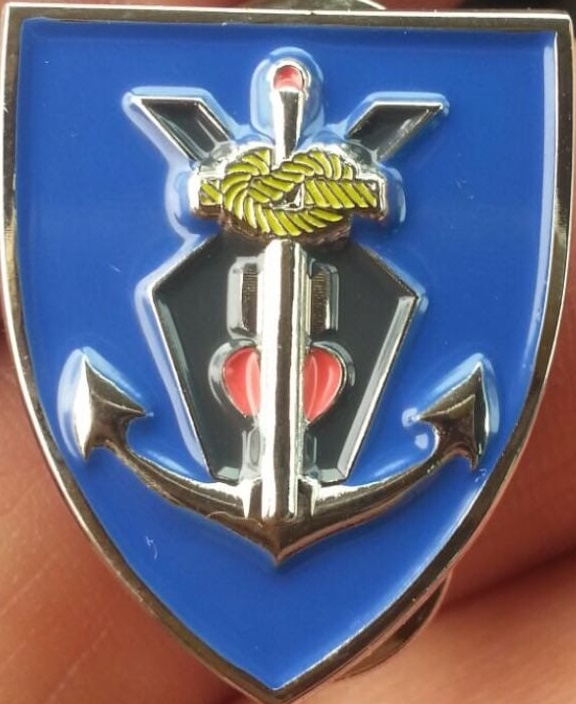
- Badge

- Warrior pin

The Missile Ship Fleet, officially called Shayetet 3, is the main surface combat force of the Israeli Navy. The fleet was established in 1967 and includes 15 missile ships of the Saar 4.5, Saar 5 and Saar 6 models. In addition, the Ahi Bat Yam auxiliary ship is under its command. It is the only fleet of the Israeli Navy operating Surface vessels (as the Israeli Navy only uses submarines and missile ships).

== Roles ==
The cruise missions of the missile ships are derived from the mission of the Israeli Navy: "to give a safe coast and open navigation to Israel". In times of war, the Navy's duties are naval warfare against the enemy's fleets, assistance to the ground forces, shelling of installations and traffic routes on the enemy's coast, securing the shipping lanes to Israel and protecting the country's beaches.

Except in times of war, the fleet is assigned various tasks: operations to gather intelligence, regular security patrols against hostile sabotage activity and preventing the supply of weapons to terrorist elements and providing backup to ground forces in operational operations. In the 2nd decade of the 21st century, with the establishment of the drilling arrays and gas production, drilling: Tamar, Leviathan and Tanin in the Mediterranean Sea, the navy's missions were expanded and they also include security of the state's assets at sea.

== Fleet ==
=== Missile corvettes ===
Class	Photo	Ships	Commission year	Origin	Notes
Sa'ar 5 [ˈsa'ar] (Tempest)		INS Eilat, [ejˈlat] (Eilat); INS Lahav [ˈlahav] (Blade); INS Hanit [χaˈnit] (Spear)	1994; 1994; 1995	United States	-
Sa'ar 6		INS Magen [maˈgen] (Shield); INS Oz (Courage); INS Atzmaut (Independence); INS Nitzachon (Victory)	2020; 2021; 2023; 2023	Germany	

=== Missile boats ===
Class	Photo	Ships	Commission year	Origin	Notes
Sa'ar 4.5		INS Romach, [ˈʁo̞maχ] (Lance) INS Keshet, [ˈke̞ʃe̞t] (Bow) INS Hetz, [ˈχe̞t͡s] (Arrow) INS Kidon, [kiˈdo̞n] (Javelin) INS Tarshish, [tarˈʃiʃ] (Tarshish) INS Yaffo, [ˈjafo̞] (Jaffa) INS Herev, [ˈχe̞ʁe̞v] (Sword) INS Sufa [suˈfa] (Storm)	1981 1982 1991 1995 1995 1998 2002 2003	Israel	INS Kidon was originally a Sa'ar 4 built in 1974 and converted to Saar 4.5 class in 1994; INS Tarshish was originally a Sa'ar 4 built in 1975 and converted to Saar 4.5 class in 1998; INS Yaffo was originally a Sa'ar 4 built in 1975 and converted to Saar 4.5 class in 1998; The Sa'ar 4.5 boats are expected to be replaced with the 76m-long Reshef class corvette starting in the late 2020s

== Organisation ==
The fleet is divided into four combat squadrons.

- Squadron 31 - Squadron of Sa'ar 4.5 : INS Tarshish, INS Herev and INS Sufa, INS Hetz.
- Squadron 32 - Another squadron of Sa'ar 4.5: INS Kidon and INS Yaffo, Achi Keshet, INS Romach and the auxiliary ship INS Bat Yam 2, which is used for underwater detection.
- Squadron 33 - Corvette squadron of the Sa'ar 5 : INS Lahav, INS Hanit and INS Eilat.
- Squadron 36 - Corvette squadron of the Sa'ar 6 : INS Magen, INS Oz, INS Atzmaut and INS Nitzachon.
- Extra Auxiliary ship - An Auxiliary ship INS Bat Galim 3, was sold to the government company Israel Seas and Lakes Research in 2015, but the Navy retains the right to recruit for wartime service.

== Command Structure ==
The organization of each ship is done in four departments. Each department is headed by a naval officer in the rank of captain who reports to the ship's commander. The departments are:

- GNK department - activates the detection and communication devices and creates a situational picture for the commander.
- Weapons department - operates and maintains the missile cannons.
- Electronics department - maintains the detection and communication devices and operates the electronic warfare means .
- Machine department - operates and maintains the engines and the electrical and hydraulic systems.
- Anti-submarine warfare - ships designed for anti-submarine warfare do not have a separate department. The means of detection are operated by the GNAK department and the means of armament are operated and maintained by the weapons department.

== History ==
=== Establishment ===
On October 1, 1966, the first command structure of the fleet was established: Squadron 311. In the order of establishment, its mission was defined:

- Fighting with missiles and cannons .
- Anti- submarine warfare

=== Cherbourg Project ===
The Cherbourg Project (or Boats of Cherbourg) was an Israeli military operation that took place on 24 December 1969 and involved the escape of five remaining armed Sa'ar 3 class boats from the French port of Cherbourg (Cherbourg-Octeville since 2000, Cherbourg-en-Cotentin since 2016). The boats had been paid for by the Israeli government but had not been delivered due to the French arms embargo in 1969. The whole operation was planned by the Israeli Navy, and was codenamed Operation Noa, after the daughter of Captain Binyamin "Bini" Telem.

The boats taken from Cherbourg were still unarmed platforms on their arrival in Israel. They were brought into the navy and armed with Gabriel missiles and ECM and EW systems produced by MABAT and RAFAEL. Their commissioning into the Israeli Navy was overseen by Commodore Yehoshua Lahav Schneidemesser, a Haganah member who had volunteered with the Royal Navy during the Second World War, and who was at the time the division head of Equipment and Platforms.

The flotilla's working up was overseen by Captain Hadar Kimhi, who was later promoted to commodore commanding the Naval base of Haifa. New concepts of sea missile warfare were developed by the navy and new ECM/EW techniques were developed with the leadership of Captain Herut Zemach who was awarded the Israel Defense Prize for his efforts, creating a new generation of missile boats. Later, new Israeli Sa'ar boats were developed and built in Haifa Shipyards under the leadership of Haim Schachal, the chief engineer of the Israel Shipyards.

Two of the boats were launched a few months before the Yom Kippur War, INS Reshef (Flash) and INS Keshet (Bow), Sa'ar 4 class missile boats. For his leadership, Schachal was awarded the Israel Defense Prize.

=== Seizure of militant vessels ===
The fleet's ships assisted in security missions . In the course of 1970s decade, ships of the Flotilla captured four militant boats en route to Israel. The first capture of a boat happened on July 27, 1970. A "Hatz" Saar 3 model captured a boat with three militants on their way to the Gaza Strip, west of Rosh Carmel.

=== Operation Hood 20 ===
Palestinian Liberation Organisation militants in Lebanon launched maritime rifs into Israel. On the night of January 14/15, 1971, paratroopers and the 13th Fleet were deployed for the first time by sea in Operation Hood 20, under the command of Haim Nadal - commander of the invading force, and Hadar Kimchi - commander of the naval force. The targets were found in Sarafand and Bas-Sheikh, south of Sidon on the coast of Lebanon. Six ships of the fleet, one "Hanit" under the command of Ephraim Ashed, four ships under the command of Shabtai. Levi - Achi "Hatz" under the command of Avraham ben Shoshan, Achi "Mishgav" under the command of Gadi ben Ze'ev, Achi "Mazanak" under the command of Avraham Ashur and Achi Haifa (Saar 2) under the command of Eli Rahab carried the force of the paratroopers. After a security guard under the command of Rafi Apel, she carried the 13th Fleet force, which was under the command of Hanina Amishav . The raiding forces were led from the steels to the coast in rubber boats. Two naval sabotage bases and a land training base were attacked and destroyed.

=== Battle of Latakia ===
The Battle of Latakia was a small but revolutionary naval action of the Yom Kippur War, fought on 7 October 1973 between Israel and Syria. It was the first naval battle in history to see combat between surface-to-surface missile-equipped missile boats and the use of electronic deception.

=== Battle of Baltim ===
The Battle of Baltim was fought between the Israeli Navy and the Egyptian Navy on 8–9 October 1973, during the Yom Kippur War. It took place off the Nile Delta, between Baltim and Damietta. The battle began when six Israeli Sa'ar-class missile boats heading toward Port Said were engaged by four Egyptian Osa-class missile boats coming from Alexandria. It lasted about forty minutes. The Osas fired Styx missiles, missed, and began to withdraw back to Alexandria when the Israelis began to give chase. Two Osas were sunk by Gabriel missiles within a span of ten minutes, and a third was sunk twenty-five minutes later. The fourth made it back to base.

=== Second Battle of Latakia ===
The Second Battle of Latakia was a small naval battle of the Yom Kippur War fought on 11 October 1973 between Israel and Syria. The Israeli Navy force consisted of Sa'ar 2-class, Sa'ar 3-class, and Sa'ar 4-class missile boats armed with Gabriel anti-ship missiles while the Syrian Navy force consisted of Soviet-made Komar- and Osa-class missile boats armed with Soviet-manufactured P-15 Termit (NATO reporting name SS-N-2 Styx) anti-ship missiles.

=== Operation Litani ===
INS Yaffo (Saar 4), under the command of Lt. Col. Hanina Amishev, took an active part during the 1978 South Lebanon conflict. In general, the ship fired about 1000 76 mm shells.

=== Battle of Rabbit Island ===
The Battle of Rabbit Island was the destruction of a militant base on an island north of Tripoli (Lebanon) . On June 27–28, 1984, a force that included the INS Reshef (under the command of Major Ami Segev), the submarine INS Rahav, (under the command of Haim Kafir), and a pair of swallows (under the command of the Sheitat 13 Commander Yadidia Yaari ) attacked the naval commando base of militants on the island of Al-Nahal and destroyed militant base and vessels.

=== Operation Derech Netz ===
Operation Derech Netz was carried out by four assault ships of the Flotilla under the command of Col. Shimon Meir, carrying a force of submarine fighters from the 13th flotilla under the command of Yedidia Yaari to attack militant ships in the port of Annaba in Algeria.

=== Destruction of Ateviros ===
On April 20, 1985, a Panamanian-flagged ship Ateviros carrying militants and speedboats from Algeria was discovered heading for an assault on Kirya in Tel Aviv. After the ship refused to stop and an RPG missile was fired from it, it was sunk. INS Muledat (commanded by Dani Halevi) and INS Mevat (commanded by Capt. Yaron Zahar) also participated in the operation.

=== Seizure of Castlerdy ===
The seizure of the Castlerdy' yacht on August 25, 1985 . A small ship with an Australian flag and an American crew that tried to transport a platoon of trained militants from Cyprus to Lebanon. Their mission was to carry out an attack in Kiryat Shmona. A naval force under the command of Lt. Col. Alex Eyal, which included INS Gaula and Unit 881, the 31st squadron and the "Sheaf" naval patrol aircraft, ambushed it on its way. The ship was stopped and the terrorists were transferred for questioning. After an official confiscation process, she was used as a vessel to locate sea mines under the name "Octopus".

=== Operation Mekset Shifur ===
Operation Mekset Shifur was the capture of the terrorist ship Angel, the farthest capture from the shores of the country was on the night of August 4, 1988 in the Adriatic Sea . When it became known that the yacht "Angel" carrying a group of Fatah officers was sailing from Yugoslavia to Libya, it was intercepted about 25 miles south of the Gulf of Trento in Italy by four Sa'ar ships - Achi "Jaffa" (Sa'ar 4), Ach "Keshet" (Saar 4.5 Noshav), one "Moldat" (Saar 4), and one "Gaula" (Saar 4.5 Hochit), under the command of the battalion commander Col. Yossi Levy . Four officers from the Fatah naval force were arrested and the yacht was towed to Haifa.

=== Operation Dust Road ===
Operation Dust Road In the early 1990s, ships of the navy engaged in patrols to prevent the infiltration of fast armed boats. In the security patrols, the fleet spent over 3000 hours at sea. The activity of the ships and patrol planes over the sea became known to the militants and deterred them from approaching. The attempted attack was carried out on 27–30 May 1990: six armed boats launched at a great distance ran out of fuel before reaching the shore and the attack was averted.

=== Operation Grapes of Wrath ===
The flottia took part in the Operation Grapes of Wrath in southern Lebanon against Hezbollah by blockading the ports of Beirut, Sidon and Tyre.

=== 2006 Lebanon War ===
The Flotilla participated in the Second Lebanon War and fired a total of 2,500 shells. INS Hanit which was patrolling in Lebanese waters ten nautical miles off the coast of Beirut. It was damaged on 14 July 2006 on the waterline, under the aft superstructure by a missile (likely a Chinese-designed C-802) fired by Hezbollah that reportedly set the flight deck on fire and crippled the propulsion systems inside the hull. However, INS Hanit stayed afloat, withdrew and made the rest of the journey back to Ashdod port for repairs under its own power. Four crew members were killed during the attack: Staff Sergeant Tal Amgar, Corporal Shai Atas, Sergeant Yaniv Hershkovitz, and First Sergeant Dov Steinshuss.

=== Operation Cast Lead ===
During the Gaza War (2008–2009) the Israeli Navy attacked Hamas' rocket launchers and outposts, command and control centers, a Hamas patrol boat, and the office of Hamas Prime Minister Ismail Haniyeh, using the Typhoon Weapon System and Surface to surface missiles. The navy coordinated with other Israeli forces and used powerful shipboard sensors to acquire and shell targets on land. Records of the attacks published by the navy indicate that for the first time vessels were equipped with Spike ER electro-optically guided anti-armor missiles. Videos of an attack showed precision hits from a Typhoon stabilizing gun despite a rolling sea. Versions of the Spike were also used by ground units and possibly by helicopters or unmanned aerial vehicles. Shayetet 13 naval commandos were also deployed to attack targets on land, and reportedly attacked an Iranian ship loaded with arms for Hamas, which was docking in Sudan. On 28 December, Naval vessels shelled the Port of Gaza.

On 29 December, the Free Gaza Movement relief boat Dignity carrying volunteer doctors with 3.5 tons of medical supplies, human rights activists (Among them Caoimhe Butterly and former US Representative Cynthia McKinney), and a CNN reporter was involved in an altercation with Israeli patrol boats. The captain of the Free Gaza vessel said that their vessel had been rammed intentionally and that there had been no warning before it had been rammed. An Israeli spokesman disputed this, and said the collision was caused by the Dignity attempting to outmaneuver the patrol boats after disobeying Israeli orders to turn back.

On 4 January the Israeli Navy extended its blockade of the Gaza Strip to 20 nautical miles.

Throughout the war, the Israeli Navy employed Sa'ar 4.5 class missile boats of the Flotilla in addition to Super Dvora Mk III class patrol boats .

=== Operation Four Species ===
Francop Affair, On November 4, 2009, the ship MV Francop was radioed by an Israeli Navy missile boat of the Flotilla, which ordered it to halt and prepare for inspection. Shayetet 13 naval commandos then boarded the ship without resistance. The navy said that the crew was not aware of the purported smuggling and cooperated with the commandos. The commandos broke open the shipping containers and discovered crates of weapons and munitions hidden between sacks of polyethylene stacked along the openings and sides.

=== Operation Iron Law ===
The Flotilla participated in the Victoria Affair which was a military operation conducted by the Israel Defense Forces (IDF) in March 2011 in which the Israeli Navy intercepted the vessel Victoria on the international waters in the Mediterranean, and discovered concealed weapons which, according to the IDF, were destined for Palestinian militant organizations in the Gaza Strip. The vessel was found to be carrying approximately 50 tons of weapons, including C-704 anti-ship missiles, rocket launchers, radar systems, mortar shells and rifle ammunition

=== Operation Pillars of Defence ===
The Flotilla participated in the 2012 Gaza War, carrying out bombardments of the Gaza strip.

=== Operation Full Disclosure ===
Operation Full Disclosure was an Israeli seizure of an Iranian vessel heading towards Port Sudan via Iraq. The operation was led by Major General Ram Rothberg, commander-in-chief of the Israel Navy, on board Sa'ar 5-class corvette INS Hanit. INS Hetz, a Sa'ar 4.5-class missile boat of the folitta also participated in the Operation.

=== Operation Protective Edge ===
During the 2014 Gaza War, the Flotilla off-shore fleet fired 3,494 naval shells, into the Gaza Strip.

=== Gaza war ===
During the Gaza war during the October 7 attacks, the Navy stopped militants who tried to enter Israel by sea during the Zikim attack. The Sa'ar 6 ships of the Flotilla INS Oz and INS Magen, carried out, for the first time, as part of the fighting, sea surface attacks towards the Gaza Strip. As part of these attacks, they destroyed a facility for the production of weapons, an outpost and an observation post of Hamas.

=== Red Sea Crisis ===
INS Hanit and INS Magen were deployed in the red sea during the Red Sea crisis following Houthi movement's attacks on Israel. On 9 April, the IDF used a seaborne missile from the INS Magen to shoot down a UAV for the first time. The UAV, which came from the Red Sea, breached Israeli airspace and crossed into the area of the Gulf of Aqaba, setting off sirens in Eilat.

== Commanders ==
Fleet commanders
	commander		Beginning of term	end of term	Notes
1		Benjamin Talm	1967	1968	The first commander at the time of the reception of the ships in Shrevor.
2		Hadar Kimchi	1968	1971	Conversion from vessels to combat units, author of "Battle Theory for Assault Ships", escape commander Cherbourg Ships, beginning of operations against terrorist targets - Operation Hood 20, assimilation of combat theory.
3		Shabtai Levi	1971	1973	Institutionalization of naval procedures for missile combat, transport and security of raiding forces against terrorist targets - Operation Hood 54-55 and Operation Aviv Neorim. Preparation of combat plans for the attack on the Syrian coast and the ambush on the Sinai coast carried out in the Yom Kippur War
4		Michael Barkai	July 1973	June 1974	In the Yom Kippur War he was mentioned in the Masterpiece Decoration, improving the issue of controlling the forces.
5		Eli Rahav	June 1974	March 1976	Institutionalizing the ship's competency indicators and tests, implementing a "robust code" for instructions and reports by wireless, determining the centralized ship leave.
6		Micah Lazeros	April 1976	August 1978	Operation Liberty Bell, Operation Litany, sailing to Portugal
7	120	Haim Shaked	August 1978	1979	
8		Zeev Yehezkali	August 1978	July 1979	Commander of Sheitat 5 at the same time.
9		Abraham Ben-Shoshan	1979	1981	First Visit of the Navy ships in the port of Alexandria in Egypt.
10		Aryeh Runa	1981	1983	Improving the level of execution of the "combined battle" and raising the level of artillery during the First Lebanon War.
11		Shimon Meir	July 1983	1985	The flotilla reached 26 combat units.
12		Shaul Chorev	1985	1987	Evolution of the naval helicopter, cooperation with the Sixth Fleet, combined operations with the Sheitat 13 in Lebanon, the beginning of the reduction in SDF.
13		Yossi Levy	August 1987	August 1989	Operational improvements
14		August 1989	August 1991	Integration of "Dolphin" naval helicopters in full operation	
15		David ben Bashot	August 1991	May 1993	The long voyages, absorption of the naval helicopter and its integration into the naval combat system
16		Yaakov Gaz	1993	1995	
17		Ali Marom	1995	1997	
18		Hazi Mishita	September 1997	August 1999	Renewal of battle theory for assault ships
19		Noam Feig	1999	2001	
20		Ran Ben Yehuda	August 2001	July 2003	Computerization of reports
21		Abby Arzoni	July 2003	September 2005	The author of the book "Sheit 3 - the missile ships in the Navy"
22		Danny Maoz	September 2005	August 2007	The Second Lebanon War
23		Ilan Sheriki	August 2007	August 2009	Operation Cast Lead
24		Eli Wand	2009	2011	Operation Iron Law, Capture of the ship Victoria
25		David Salma	2011	September 2013	Operation Pillar of Cloud
26		Eyal Harel	September 2013	June 2015	The capture of the weapons ship "Closs Sea" in the Red Sea, Operation Tzuk Eitan
27		Ziv Rom	June 2015	August 2017	
28		Guy Goldfarb	August 2017	August 2019	The flotilla was awarded a letter of appreciation from the Chief of Staff Aviv Kochavi and a certificate of appreciation from the commander of the sea arm Eli Sharvit for a series of operations.
29		Meir Azuri	August 2019	September 2021	
30		Erez ben Zion	September 2021	July 2023	
31	No Picture	Eldad Borochovich	July 2023	July 30, 2023	Present

== References and sources ==
- Shmuel Yaniv, יום שייטת הסטילים, Between Waves, April 1975, p. 2.
- Remy Antian, פיליטון - יום בחייו של סטילן, Bin Galim, October 1975 (second booklet), p. 17
- Slomo Aral, "'Before the Sea'", the story of a sailor, commander and fighter, Ministry of Defense Publishing House, 1998
- Mike Elder, "'The Enemy and the Sea'", Chapters from the Operations Manual, pp. 170–181, 199–191, 246–235, Ministry of Defense - Publishing House, 1991
- Avraham Rabinowitz, "'Sherburg Ships'", (translation from English: Aryeh Marmari, editing: Efi Meltzer), Efi Meltzer Publishing Ltd., 2001
- Yehuda Schiff (editor in charge), Ilan Kafir, Yaakov Erez; The editors of the volume: Hirsh Goodman, Slomo Man, "'The IDF in Hilo, an encyclopedia for the military and security'", the Navy volume, Reviviv Publishing House
- Slomo Man, "'Target Kiryat Shmona, an exhibition attack was prevented thanks to the Navy,'" Bin Galim, October 1998
- Col. Ido Shabach, "'Achi Lahav's voyage from the United States to Israel'", pp. 48–51, "Bin Galim" magazine Navy Association, May 2005.
- Moshe Imber and Gad Ariel, "Sheit 3 - the missile ships in the Navy", Ministry of Defense Publishing House, 2005
- Digital addition to the book "Sheit 3 - The Missile Ships in the Navy", Sheit 3, 2014
- Pesach Malovni, "'Evil will arise from the conscience'", The Syrian Army - Its Plots and Wars - A View from Damascus, pp. 465–473, 847–846, Israel Institute for the Study of Wars, 2014
- General Chaim Nedel, "'The Daring Wins,'" IDF special and combined operations in flight and deception between the two wars (1967–1973), Moden Publishing House - IDF Systems Publishing, 2015
- Dr. Aviad Rubin and Dr. Ehud Eran, with Dr. Tamir Magal "'Ashore the Seas Tishkhun'", Maritime Strategic Assessment for Israel 2015, Haifa Center for Maritime Strategy Studies, University of Haifa, 2015
- Liat Katzir "'The future is already here'", assessment of the operational situation of the naval arm, interview with the head of Maspan Haim Brigadier General Dror Friedman, "Bin Galim" magazine of the Navy association, September 2015
- Amnon Shafi, 12 פרויקטים לקליטת 12 הסטי"לים, Center for Maritime Policy and Strategy Research, Haifa University, 2023
- Lior Margolin, אימונים ראשונים on YouTube, 1970
- Yaakov Nitzan, אימונים ראשונים on YouTube, 1971
- אימוני היבנות - שייטת 3, בתחילת דרכה on YouTube
- מצגת טנק ואימונים ראשונים on YouTube
- אימונים ראשונים on YouTube
- שייטת 3, 25 שנים למדינה on YouTube, the means of warfare in the exhibition at the Museum of Enlistment and the Navy
- השקת אח"י רשף במספנות ישראל on YouTube, February 19, 1973
- שייטת ספינות הטילים בסיור מול חוף לבנון on YouTube, July 15, 1976
