= INS Magen =

Sa'ar-class corvette

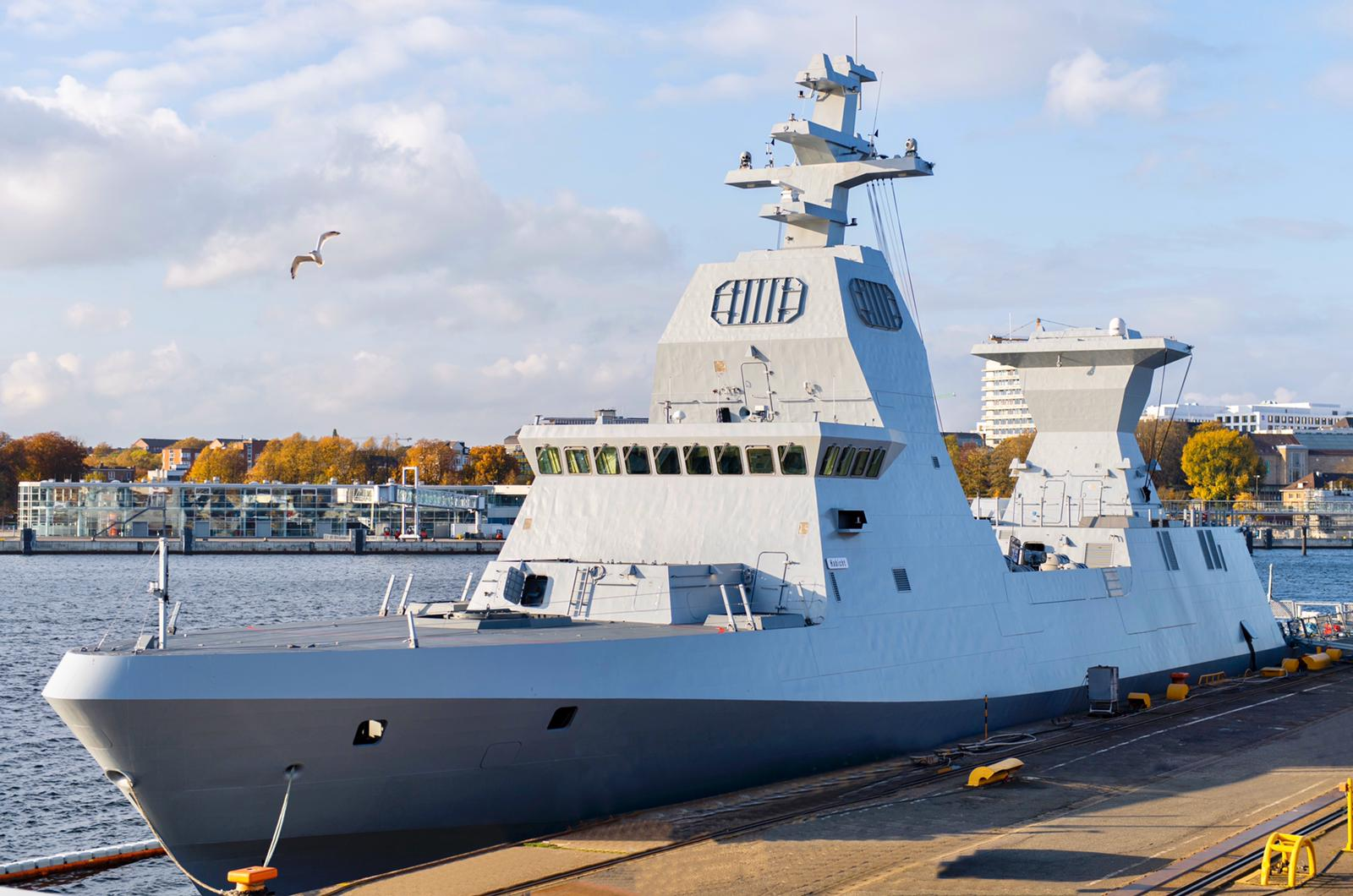
- INS Magen at Kiel in November 2020

History

Israel
- Name: Magen; (מגן)
- Namesake: Magen
- Ordered: May 2015
- Builder: German Naval Yards; ThyssenKrupp
- Laid down: 7 February 2018
- Launched: 12 May 2019
- Acquired: 2 December 2020
- Commissioned: 11 November 2020
- Status: Active
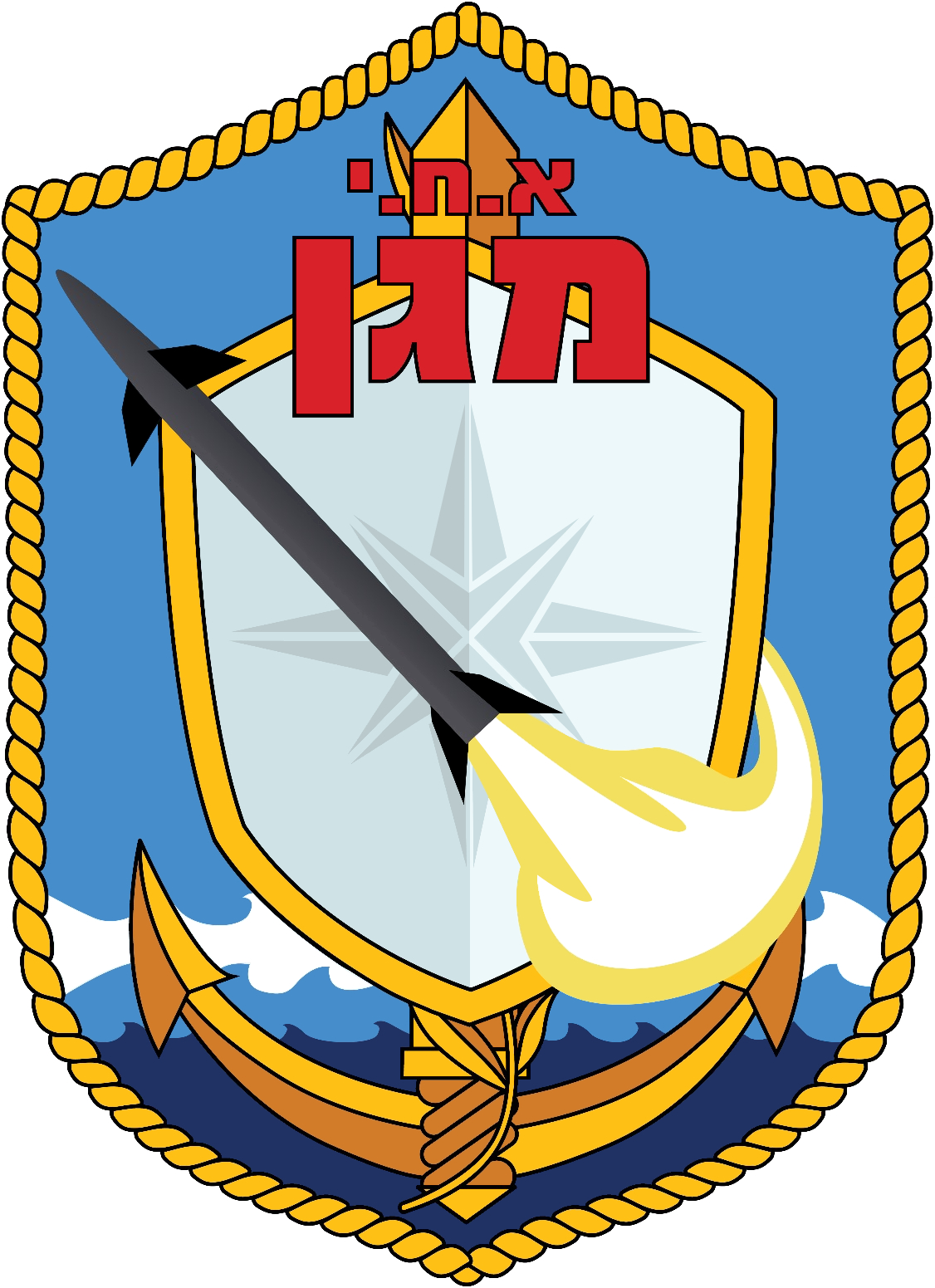
- Badge

General characteristics
- Class & type: Sa'ar 6-class corvette
- Displacement: 1,900 long tons (1,900 t) at full load
- Length: 90 m (295 ft 3 in)
- Range: 4,000 nmi (7,400 km; 4,600 mi)
- Sensors & processing systems: EL/M-2248 MF-STAR AESA radar
- Armament: 1 × Oto Melara 76 mm main gun; 2 × Typhoon Weapon Stations; 16 vertical launch cells for Barak MX LR surface-to-air missiles; 40 vertical launch cells for C-Dome point defense system; 16 Gabriel V anti ship missile; 2 × 324 mm (12.8 in) torpedo launchers; 1 MH-60 Seahawk multi mission helicopter

INS Magen (English: Shield) is a Sa'ar 6-class corvette of the Israeli Navy's Shayetet 3 fleet. She is the first ship of her class to be commissioned.

== Development and design ==
The Sa'ar 6-class corvettes' design will be loosely based on the German Braunschweig-class corvette, but with engineering changes to accommodate Israeli-built sensors and missiles such as the naval Iron Dome system. Elbit Systems has been awarded the contract to design and build the electronic warfare (EW) suites for the ships.

The Sa'ar 6-class vessels have a displacement of almost 1,900 tons at full load and are 90 m (295 ft 3 in) long. They are armed with an Oto Melara 76 mm main gun, two Typhoon Weapon Stations, 16 vertical launch cells for Barak MX LR surface-to-air missiles, 40 cells for the C-Dome point defense system, 16 anti-ship missiles Gabriel V. the EL/M-2248 MF-STAR AESA radar, and two 324 mm (12.8 in) torpedo launchers. They have hangar space and a platform able to accommodate a medium class SH-60-type helicopter.

== Construction and career ==
She was laid down on 7 February 2018 and launched on 12 May 2019 at German Naval Yards and ThyssenKrupp in Kiel. She was handed over to the Israeli Navy on 2 December and commissioned on 11 November 2020. In Haifa in September 2022, the vessel's 76/62 rapid-fire main gun was ceremonially accepted for her and her sister ship Oz.

== Operational history ==
In February 2022, the INS Magen took part in an exercise in the Mediterranean. Among other things, missile defense and unmanned vehicles were tested. During the exercise, training was given to repel missiles from Iran.

It was also deployed in the red sea following Houthi attacks on Israeli and non-Israeli ships during the Red Sea crisis

On 8 April 2024 the C-Dome battery of the Sa'ar 6-class corvette INS Magen scored the first operational interception of the system when it shot down a UAV drone near Eilat.

== Gallery ==
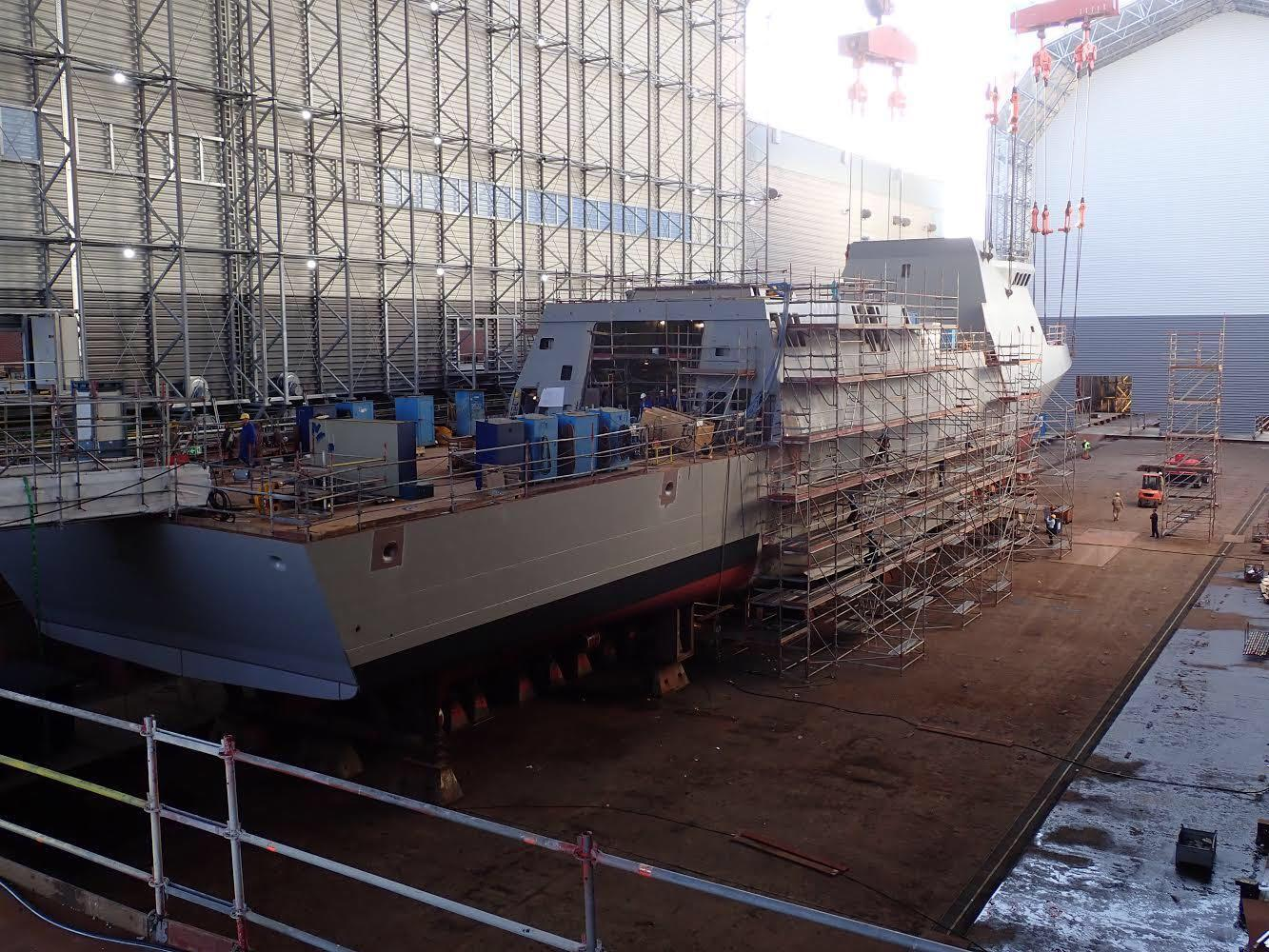
INS Magen under construction on 28 November 2018.

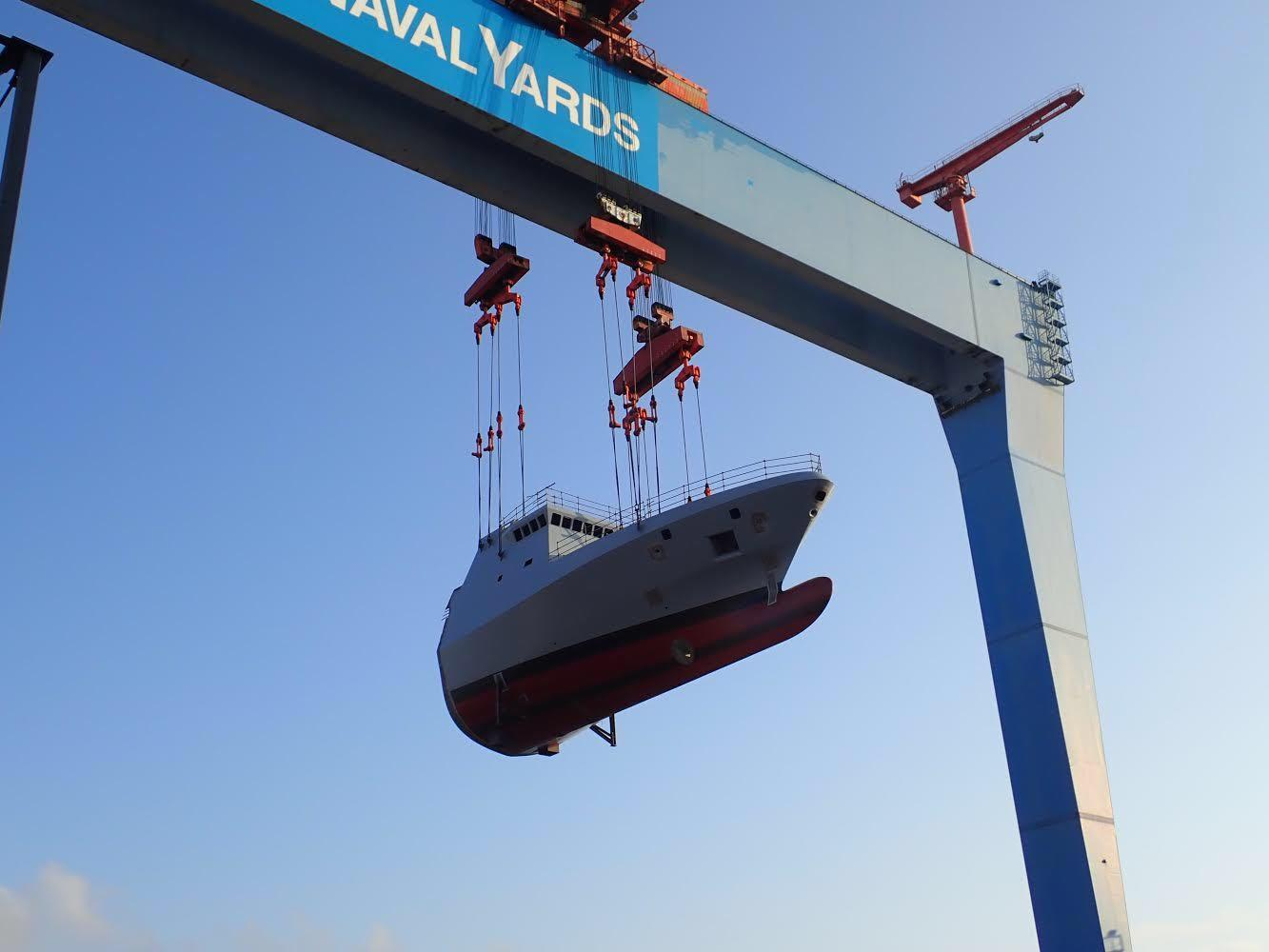
INS Magen's forward section on 28 November 2018.

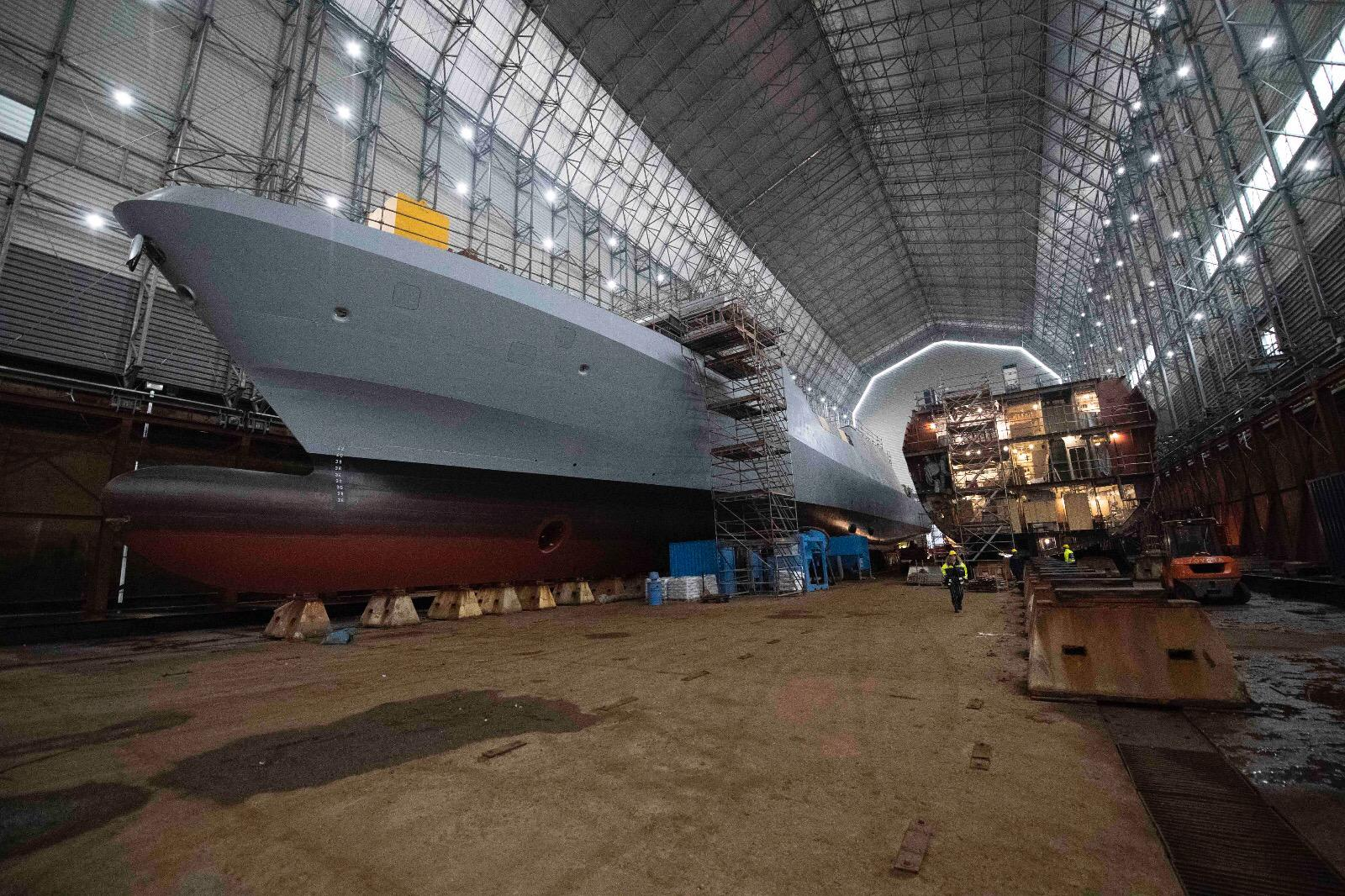
INS Magen under construction on 23 May 2019.

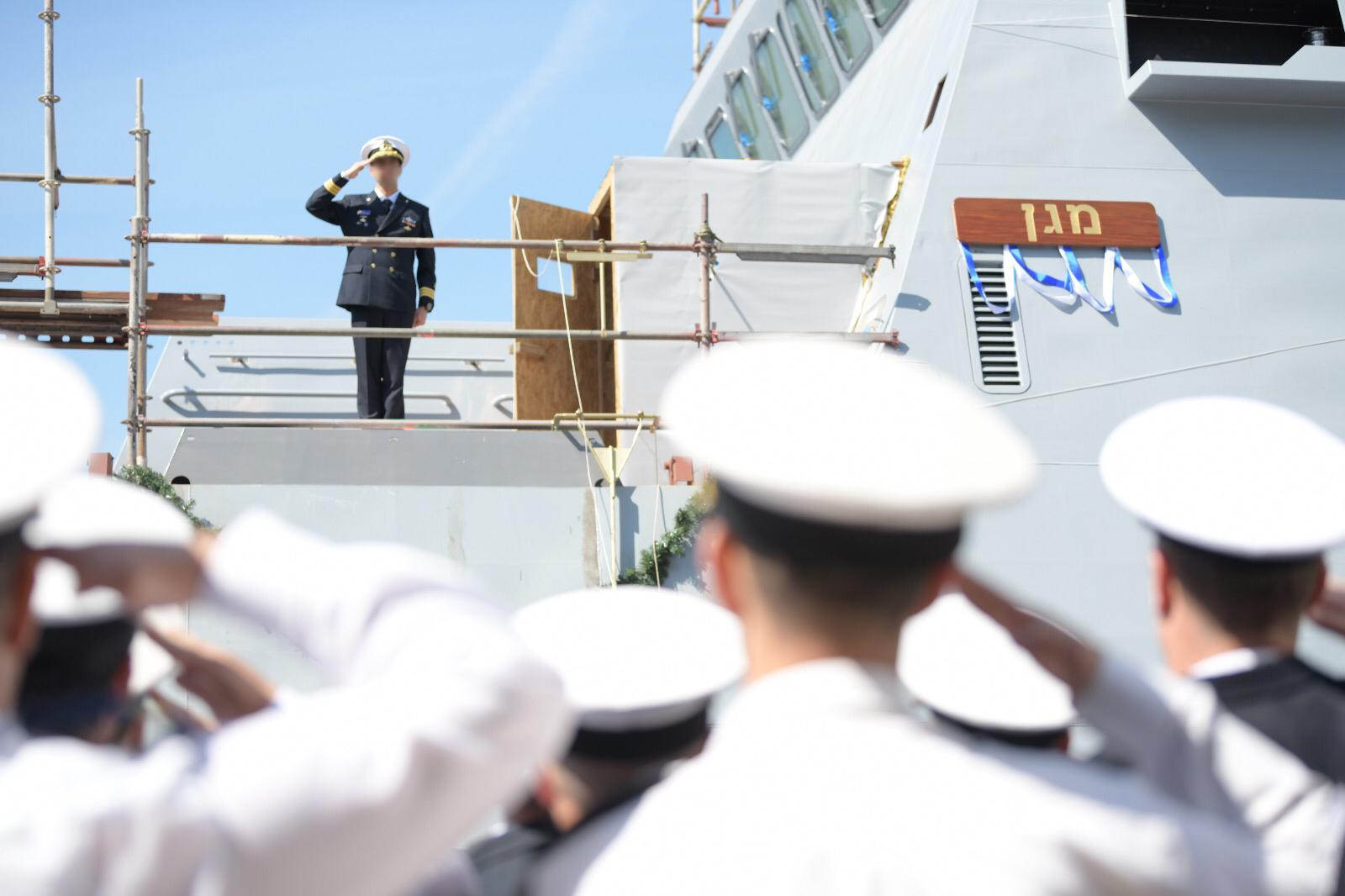
The announcing of the ship's name.

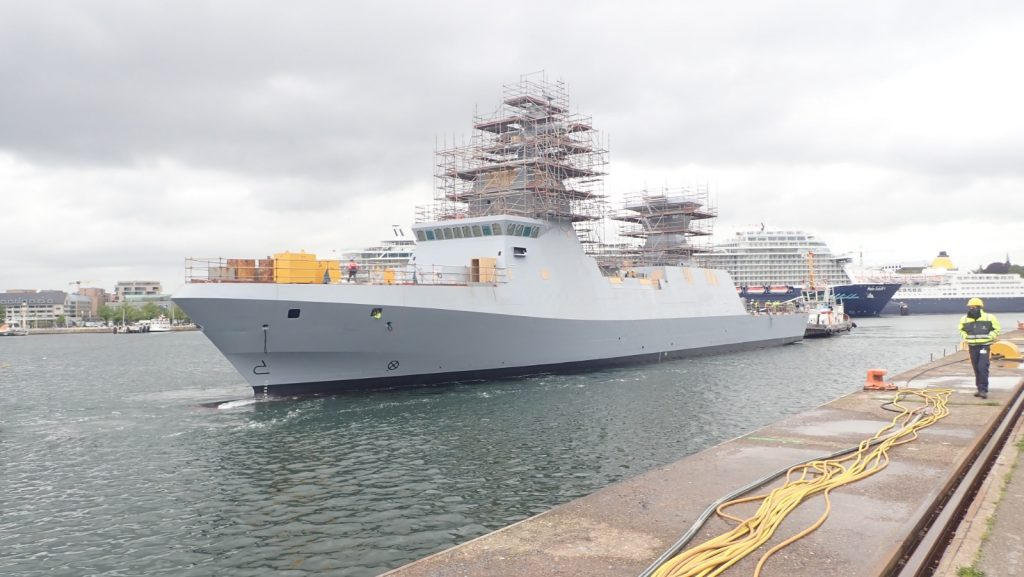
INS Magen being towed on 11 June 2019.

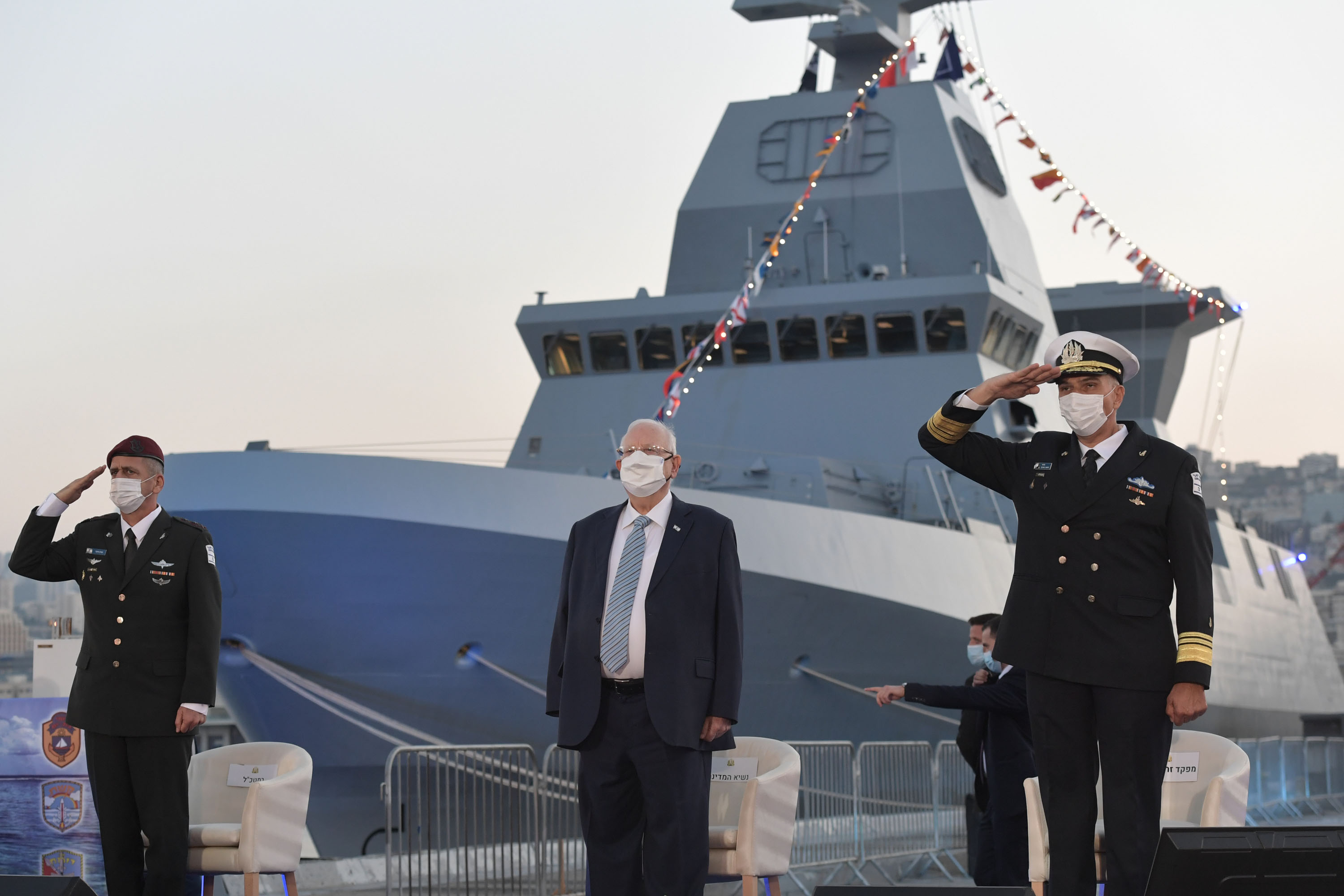
Reuven Rivlin during the handing over ceremony of INS Magen on 2 December 2020.

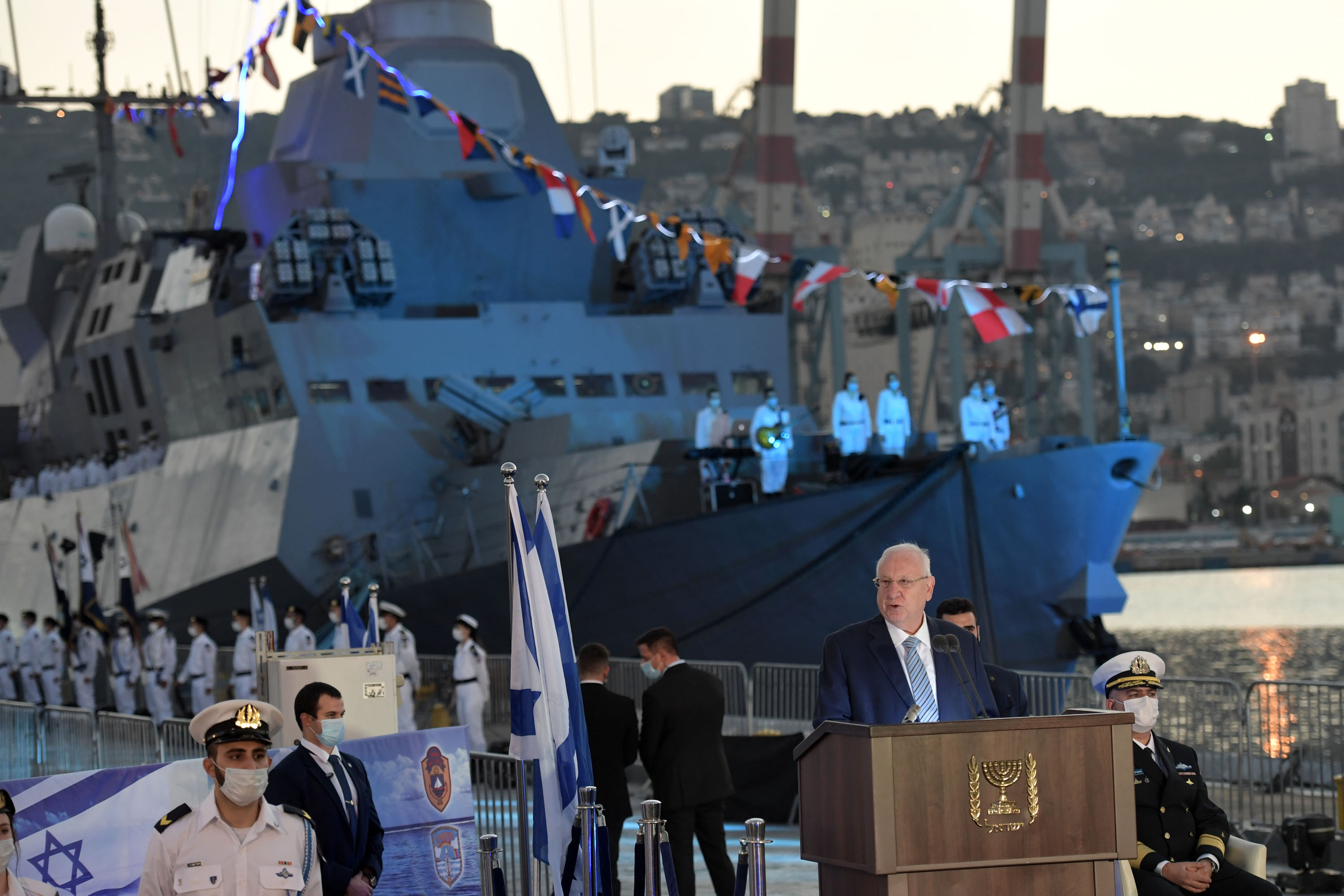
Reuven Rivlin during the handing over ceremony of INS Magen on 2 December 2020.

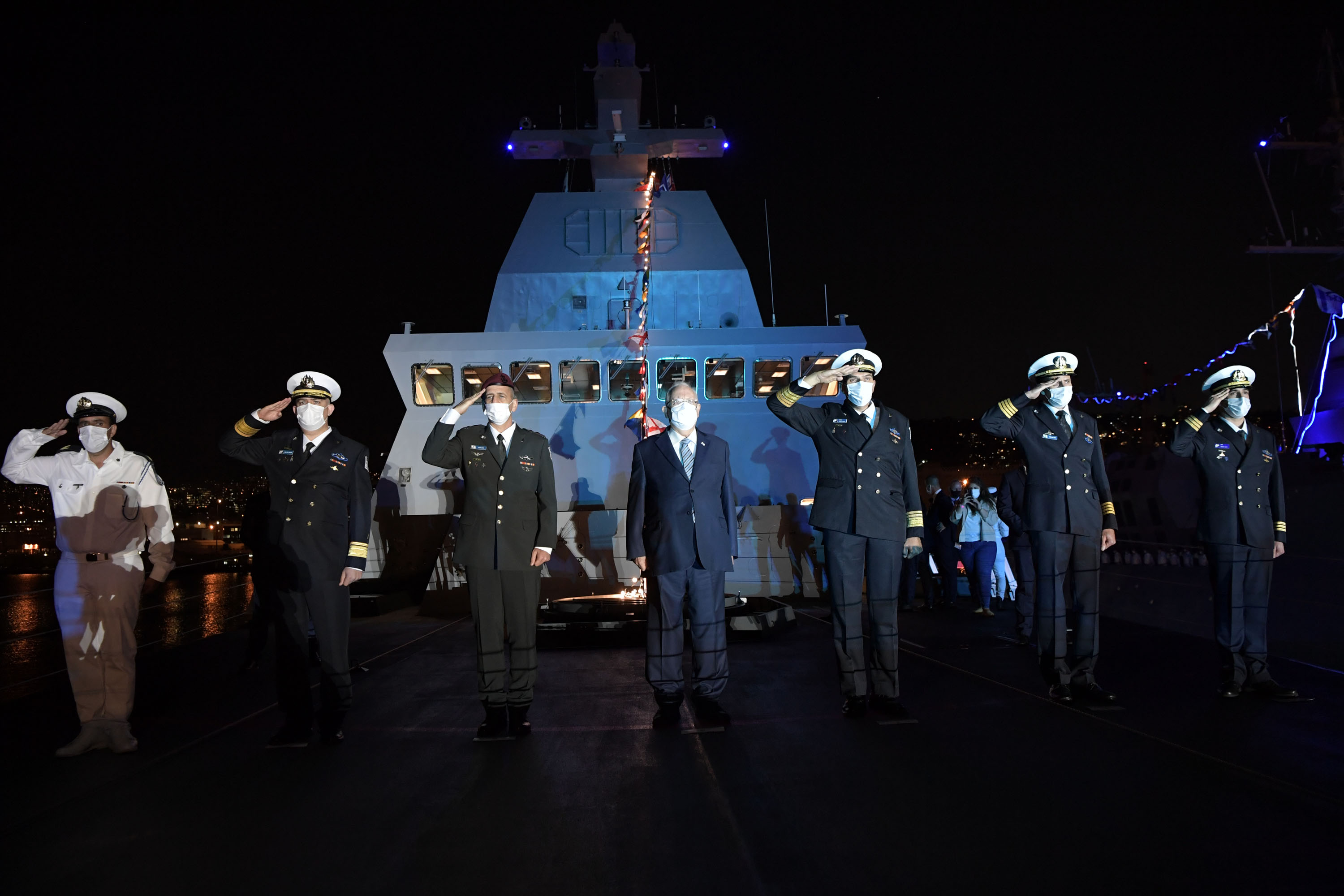
Reuven Rivlin during the handing over ceremony of INS Magen on 2 December 2020.
