= INS Romach (1981) =

Israeli Sa'ar 4.5-class missile boat

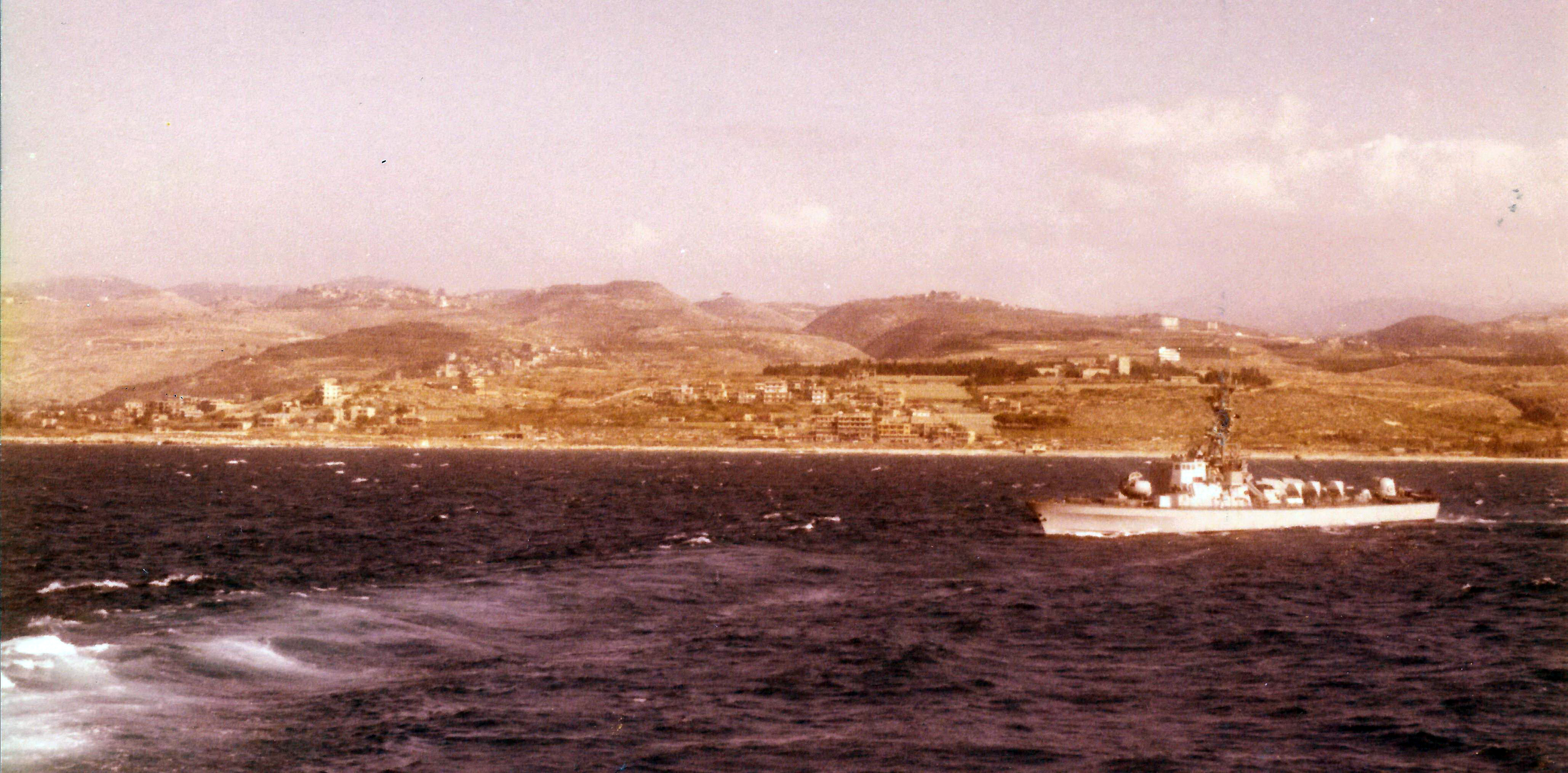
- INS Romach, 1982

History

Israel
- Name: Romach
- Builder: Israel Shipyards Ltd.
- Launched: 30 October 1981
- Commissioned: October 1981
- Status: Active
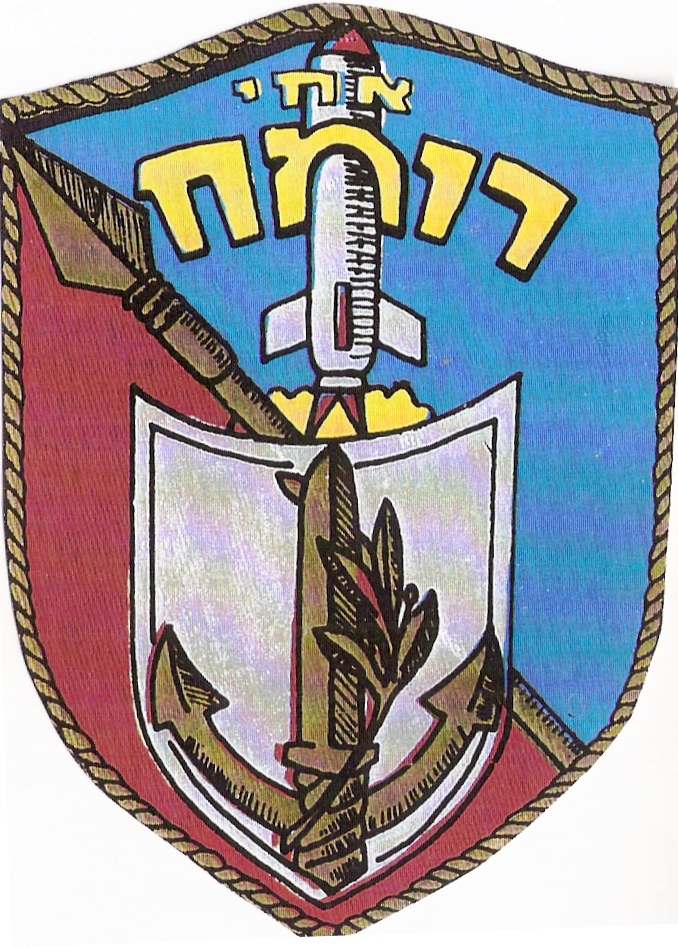
- Badge

General characteristics
- Class & type: Sa'ar 4.5-class missile boat
- Displacement: 488 tonnes (full load)
- Length: 61.7 m (202.43 ft)
- Beam: 7.6 m (24.93 ft)
- Draft: 2.5 m (8.20 ft)
- Propulsion: 4 MTU 16V 538 TB93 diesel engines, four shafts, total of 16,600 shp (12,400 kW)
- Speed: 31 knots (57 km/h)
- Range: 3,000 nautical miles (5,600 km) at 17 knots (31 km/h) 1,500 nautical miles (2,800 km) at 30 knots (56 km/h)
- Complement: 53 officers and crew
- Armament: 8 x RGM-84 Harpoon anti-ship missiles; 6 x Gabriel Mark II anti-ship missiles; 16 x Barak 1 surface-to-air missiles; 1 x OTO Melara 76 mm naval gun; 2 or 4 x 0.5 in (12.70 mm) caliber M2 Browning machine guns; 2 x 12.7 mm general-purpose machine guns; 1 x 20 mm Phalanx CIWS

INS Romach is an Israeli missile boat of the Shayetet 3 Flotilla, one of ten Sa'ar 4.5-class missile boats. She was launched in 1981 by Israel Shipyards at the Port of Haifa. She has been a part of Israeli Navy since October 1981.

== Construction ==
Sa'ar 4.5-class missile boats are a bigger version of the Sa'ar 4 class. New ships were longer, so they take an augmented armament.

INS Romach was built at the Israel Shipyards in Port of Haifa. She was launched on 30 October 1981.

== Description ==
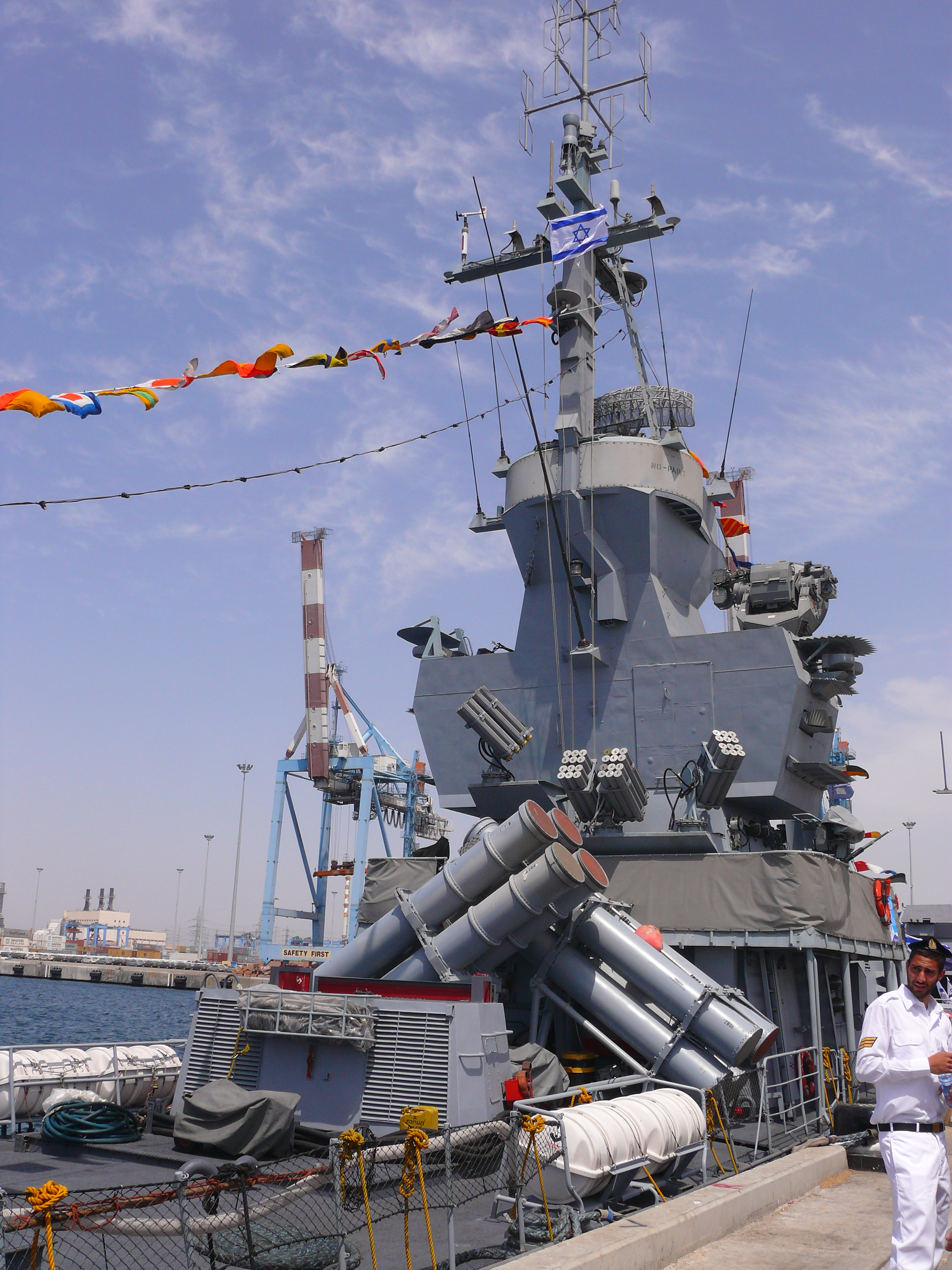
Harpoon missile launchers aboard twin unit Tarshish in 2009

The length of INS Romach is 61.7 metres (202 ft 5 in), the breadth is 7.6 metres (24 ft 11 in) and the draught is 2.5 metres (8 ft 2 in). Romach, as other Sa'ar 4.5-class missile boats, has a flush deck, short superstructure located in front of the midship and freeboard. The main propulsion machinery are four compression-ignition MTU 16V538 TB93 engines, the total power of them is 16,000 horsepower (12,000 kW). The flank speed of this ship is 31 knots (57 km/h; 36 mph); the range is 3,000 nautical miles (5,600 km; 3,500 mi) at a speed of about 17 knots (31 km/h; 20 mph) and 1,500 nautical miles (2,800 km; 1,700 mi) at 30 knots (56 km/h; 35 mph). The full load displacement is 488 tonnes.

The primary armament is two quadruple launchers of American Harpoon anti-ship missiles, allocated directly behind the superstructure. The missile is able to reach 130 km (81 mi), the speed is Mach 0.9 (1,100 km/h; 690 mph) and the weight of the warhead is 227 kg (500 lb). There are also six single launchers of Israeli Gabriel Mark II missiles allocated behind them with a 75 kg (165 lb) warhead and a range of about 36 km (22 mi). In service, the Israeli Navy set two 8-fold anti-aircraft Barak 1 launchers with the range of a projectile of 10 km (6.2 mi), making the armament identical to one in INS Hetz.

The secondary armament consists of single, dual-purpose gun OTO Melara 76 mm, allocated abaft in a gun turret. The weight of the projectile is 6 kg (13 lb), the range is 16 km (9.9 mi) and the rate of fire is 85 rounds per minute (RPM). The angle of elevation is 85°. There are also two single Oerlikon 20 mm cannon with a range of 2 km (1.2 mi) and rate of fire of 900 RPM and one double (or quadruple) station for M2 Browning machine guns. The bow is armed with close-in weapon system, Phalanx CIWS. The rate of fire is 3,000 RPM, and the range is 1,500 m (1,600 yd).
