= INS Yaffo (1998) =

Israeli Sa'ar 4.5-class missile boat

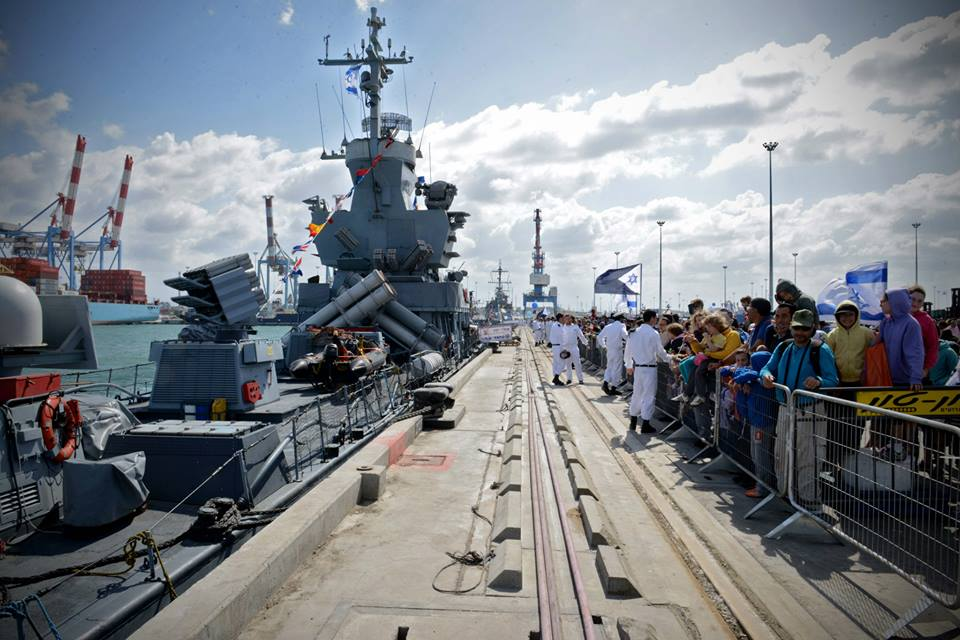
- INS Yaffo, 2016

History

Israel
- Name: Yaffo
- Builder: Israel Shipyards Ltd.
- Launched: 1998
- Commissioned: July 1, 1998
- Status: Active
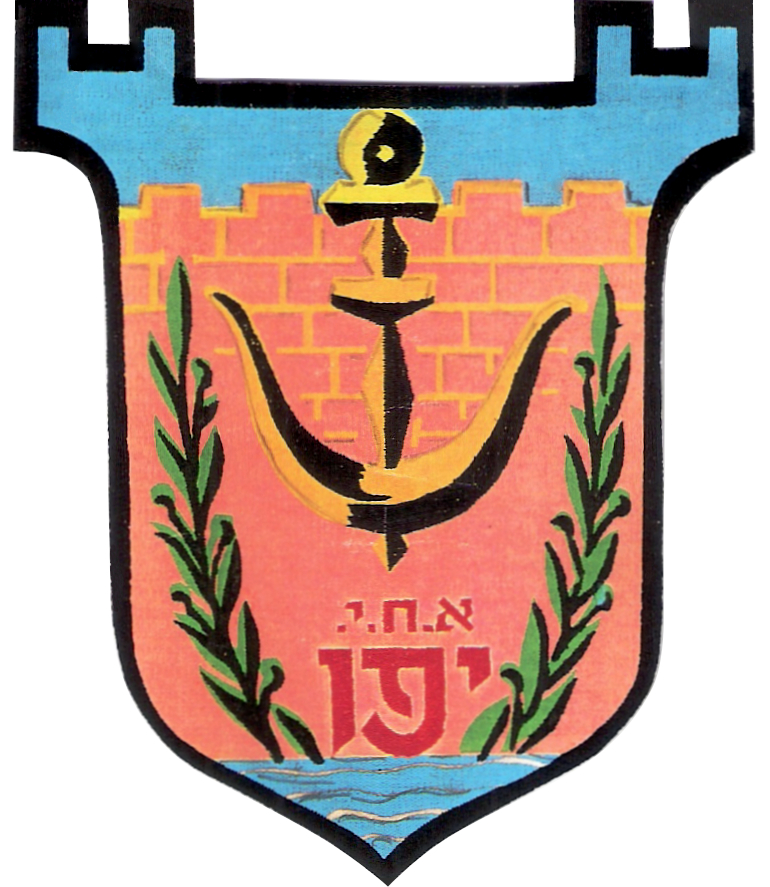
- Badge

General characteristics
- Class & type: Sa'ar 4.5-class missile boat
- Displacement: 488 tonnes (full load)
- Length: 61.7 m (202 ft 5 in)
- Beam: 7.6 m (24 ft 11 in)
- Draft: 2.5 m (8 ft 2 in)
- Propulsion: 4 MTU 16V 538 TB93 diesel engines, four shafts, total of 16,600 shp (12,400 kW)
- Speed: 31 knots (57 km/h)
- Range: 3,000 nautical miles (5,600 km) at 17 knots (31 km/h) 1,500 nautical miles (2,800 km) at 30 knots (56 km/h)
- Complement: 53 officers and crew
- Armament: 8 × RGM-84 Harpoon anti-ship missiles; 6 × Gabriel Mark II anti-ship missiles; 16 × Barak 1 surface-to-air missiles; 1 × OTO Melara 76 mm naval gun; 2 or 4 × 0.5 in (12.70 mm) caliber M2 Browning machine guns; 2 × 12.7 mm general-purpose machine guns; 1 × 20 mm Phalanx CIWS

INS Yaffo (אח"י יפו) is an Israeli missile boat of the Shayetet 3 Flotilla, one of ten Sa'ar 4.5-class missile boats. She was launched in 1998 at Israel Shipyards in the Port of Haifa. She has been a part of Israeli Navy since July 1, 1998.

== Construction ==
Sa'ar 4.5-class missile boats are enlarged variant of the Sa'ar 4 class. New ships were quite longer, in order to take an augmented armament.

INS Yaffo was built at Israel Shipyards in the Port of Haifa. She was launched in 1998 and finished within few months.

== Description ==
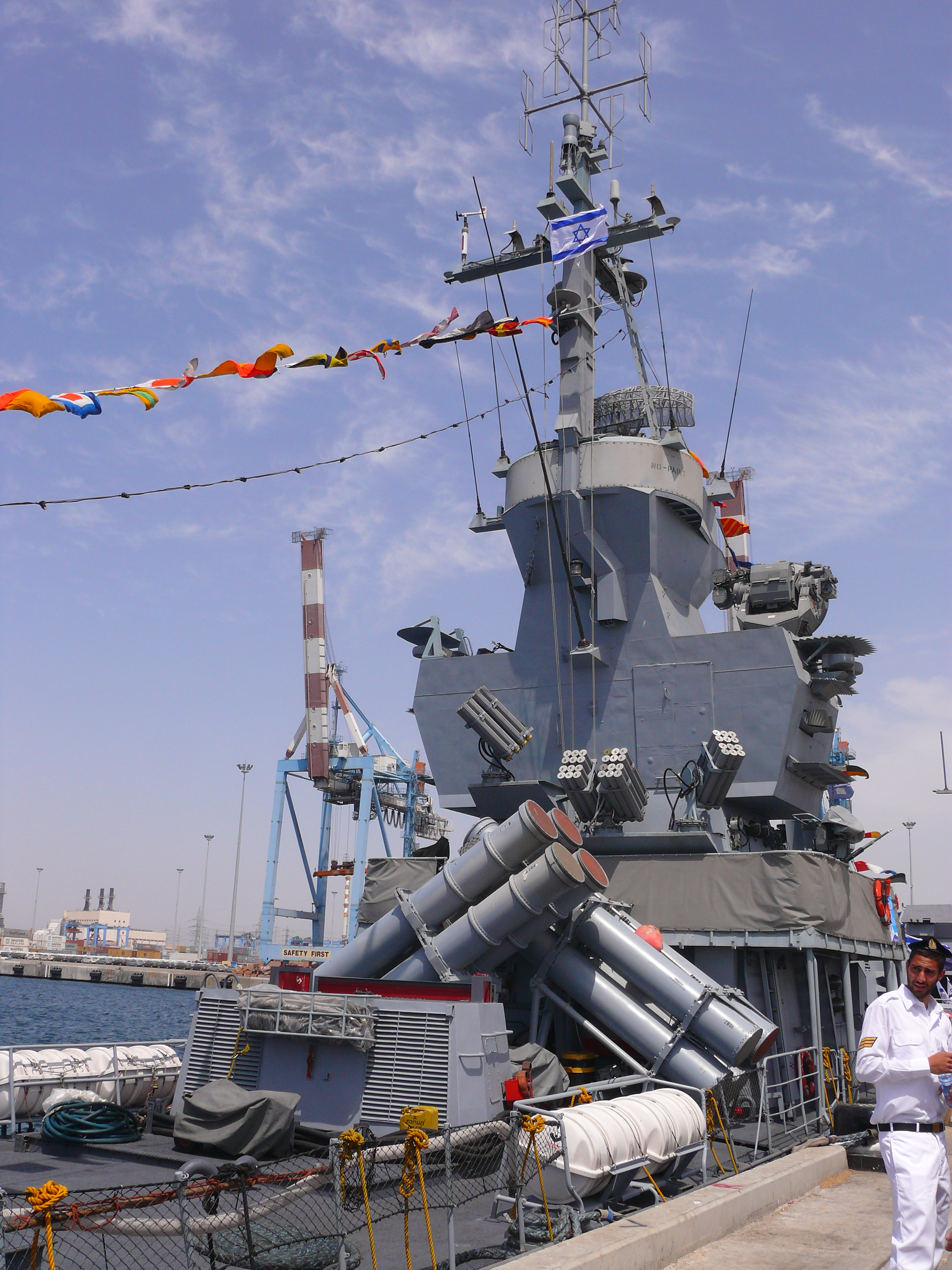
Harpoon missile launchers aboard twin unit Tarshish in 2009

The length of Yaffo is 61.7 metres (202 ft 5 in), the breadth is 7.6 metres (24 ft 11 in) and the draught is 2.5 metres (8 ft 2 in). This unit has a flush deck, short superstructure located in front of the midship and freeboard. The full load displacement is 488 tonnes. The main propulsion machinery are four compression-ignition MTU 16V538 TB93 engines, which total power is 16,000 shaft horsepower (12,000 kW). The flank speed of this ship is 31 knots (57 km/h; 36 mph); the range is 3,000 nautical miles (5,600 km; 3,500 mi) at 17 knots (31 km/h; 20 mph) and 1,500 nautical miles (2,800 km; 1,700 mi) at 30 knots (56 km/h; 35 mph).

The primary armament is two quadruple launchers of American Harpoon anti-ship missiles, allocated directly behind the superstructure. The missile is able to reach 130 km (81 mi), the speed is Mach 0.9 (1,100 km/h; 690 mph), the warhead weighs 227 kg (500 lb). To the aft of these launchers, six single launchers of Israeli Gabriel Mark II missiles are allocated, with a 75 kg (165 lb) warhead and a range of about 36 km (22 mi). There are also two deck-mounted 8-fold anti-aircraft Barak 1 launchers with the range of 10 km (6.2 mi).

The secondary armament consists of single, dual-purpose gun OTO Melara 76 mm, allocated abaft in a gun turret. The quadrant angle is 85°, the weight of the projectile is 6 kg (13 lb), the range is 16 km (9.9 mi) and the rate of fire is 85 rounds per minute (RPM). There are also two single Oerlikon 20 mm cannon with a range of 2 km (1.2 mi) and rate of fire of 900 RPM and one double (or quadruple) station for M2 Browning machine guns. Fore, close-in weapon system, Phalanx CIWS, is located.
