= German Naval Yards =

Shipbuilding company in Kiel

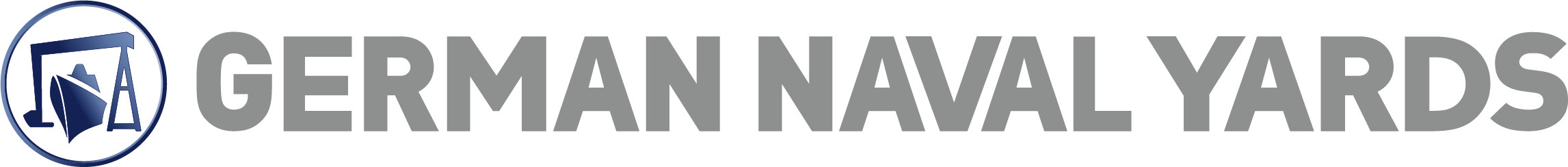
- Type: GmbH
- Industry: Shipbuilding
- Founded: 2011
- Founder: August Howaldt and Johann Schweffel
- Headquarters: Kiel, Germany
- Products: Military Vessels, Yachts, Offshore Vessels
- Parent: CMN Naval
- Website: German Naval Yards

German Naval Yards Kiel GmbH, also known as German Naval Yards, is a German company at the Kieler Förde owned by the shipbuilding group CMN Naval. The shipbuilding group includes Sir Joseph Isherwood Limited and Constructions Mécaniques de Normandie.

== History ==
=== Background ===
The origins of the present-day company German Naval Yards date back to 1838, when Johann Schweffel and August Ferdinand Howaldt founded the mechanical engineering and foundry company Schweffel & Howaldt in Kiel. Over the decades, this gave rise to the Howaldtswerke shipyards. As part of the consolidation of German shipbuilding, the Howaldtswerke facilities in Kiel and Hamburg merged in 1967 with Deutsche Werft AG to form the company Howaldtswerke-Deutsche Werft AG (HDW).

In 2005, surface shipbuilding was separated from HDW and transferred to the company HDW-Gaarden GmbH. This reorganisation formed the basis for the further development of German Naval Yards as an independent company in the field of naval shipbuilding.

=== German Naval Yards ===
In 2011, the French group acquired the surface shipbuilding division of HDW-Gaarden. In 2015, the name German Naval Yards Kiel was introduced.

In the following years, the shipyard took part in several projects for the construction, maintenance and modernisation of naval vessels, including Abeille Méditerranée, Abeille Normandie and Seaguard 96. Between 2016 and 2018, German Naval Yards carried out the construction of hulls for four superyacht projects. From 2020 to 2021, the shipyard delivered four Sa'ar 6-class corvettes to the Israeli Navy. The first unit, INS Magen, was handed over in November 2020, followed by INS Oz in May 2021. The final two corvettes were delivered in July 2021.

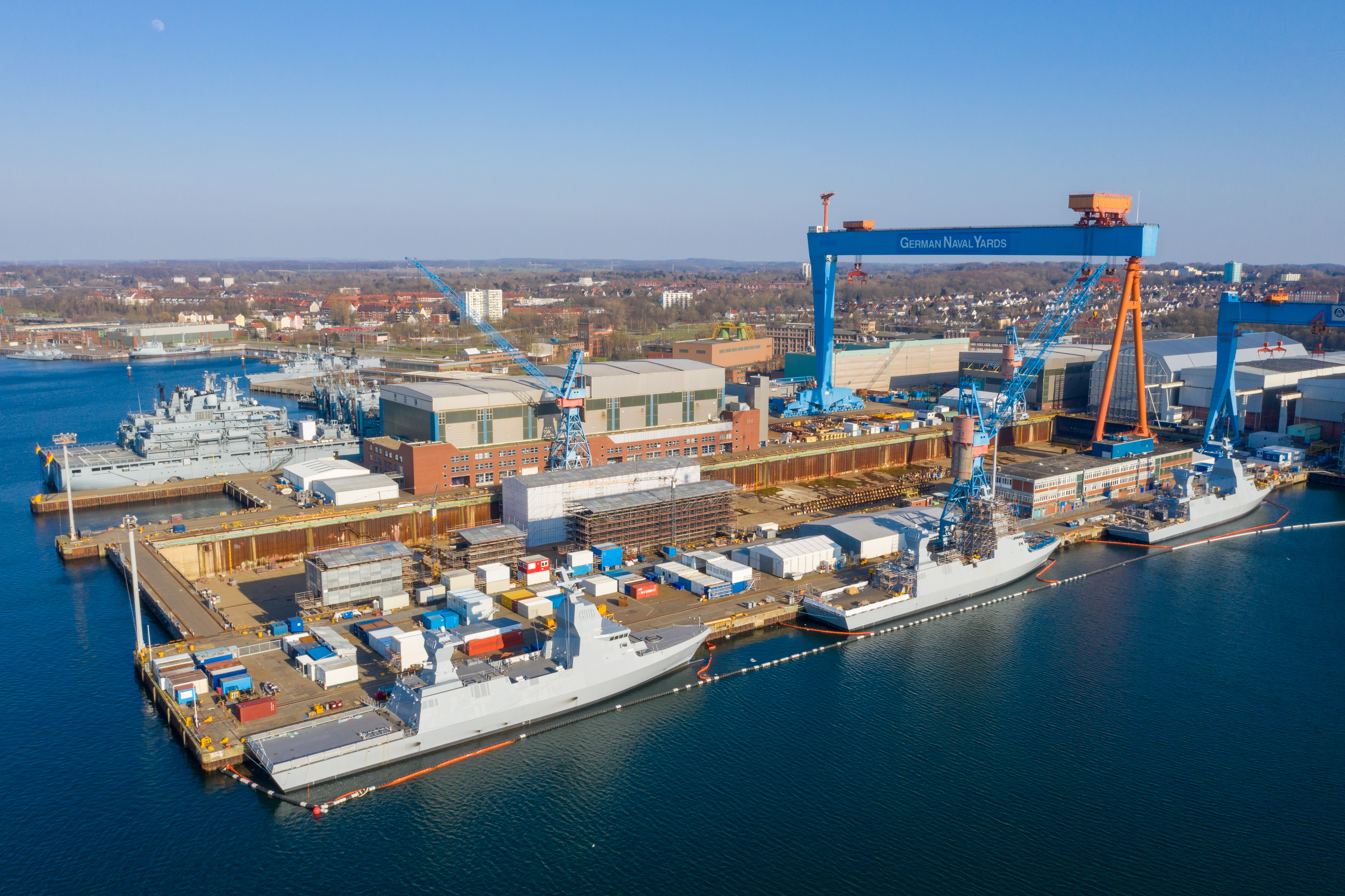
PC-IN Corvette German Naval Yards

As part of the construction programme for the new F126-class frigates, carried out by Damen and Lürssen, German Naval Yards was entrusted with the manufacture of four of the six planned units. Production is expected to begin in 2024 and extend over a period of five to eight years. This project is among the most significant current armament programmes of the Bundeswehr in the field of surface shipbuilding.

n 2025, the Kiel shipyard was awarded the contract to build a 114-meter-long superyacht, known as Project ELF. In March 2026, the shipyard announced that it would be constructing the hull for a superyacht over 100 meters in length on behalf of Abeking & Rasmussen (A&R).

== Company structure ==
German Naval Yards is part of the European shipbuilding group CMN Naval. The group also includes the French shipyard CMN, the British ILS systems specialist Isherwoods, as well as HydroQuest, ACE and AMT.

== Business activities ==
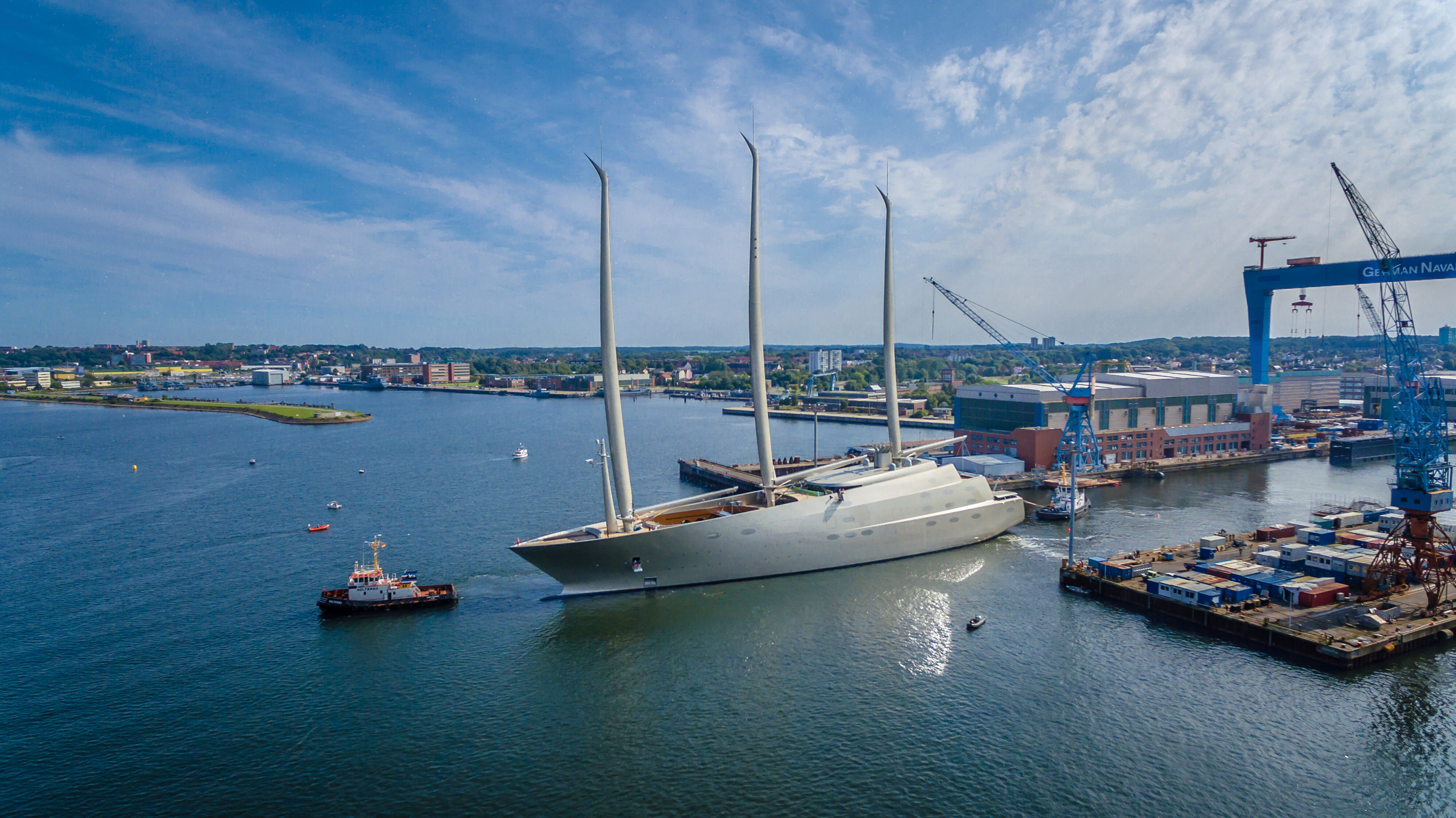
Sailing Yacht A German Naval Yards

The activities of German Naval Yards include the design, construction, conversion, as well as the maintenance and repair of ships. The company is particularly active in the construction of large naval vessels, such as corvettes and frigates.

The shipyard specializes in construction of superyachts as well.
