= Barak MX =

- A Barak MX missile launcher of the Cyprus National Guard

Service history
- In service: 2023-present
- Wars: Operation Am Kalavi

Production history
- Manufacturer: Israel Aerospace Industries
- Developed from: Barak 8

Specifications
- Length: 4.5 m (14 ft 9 in)
- Diameter: 22 cm (8.7 in) for the missile body 54 cm (21 in) in the booster stage

Barak MX is an Israeli modular anti-aircraft and missile defense system suitable for land and naval deployment. Barak MX is designed to defend against aircraft, helicopters, unmanned aerial vehicle (UAV), anti-ship missiles, cruise missiles, as well as tactical ballistic missiles. The original purpose of the system is to protect vessels and strategic naval installations. The system was developed and manufactured by Israel Aerospace Industries. The missile's rocket engine is manufactured at the "Givon" plant (formerly of IMI Systems and since November 2018 of "Tomer (Elbit Systems)").

Unlike the Barak 8 system, which was developed and manufactured in cooperation between IAI, Rafael Advanced Defense Systems and the Indian Defence Research and Development Organisation (DRDO), and the Barak 1, which was developed together with Rafael, the Barak MX is an exclusive development of IAI based on the experience of the Barak 8 and Barak 1 systems.

The system is installed on the Israeli Navy's Sa'ar 6-class ships, where it is called "Barak Magen". The land-based configuration of the system was also used by the Israeli Air Force's air defence system during Operation Am Kalavi.

== Description ==
Barak MX missile launcher next to an EL/M-2084 multi-mission radar

Barak MX is a modular system that includes a fire control center, (Note: See Ship gun fire-control system for the naval aspect of the system.) a variety of radar types, and four types of interceptors. The system components can be customized according to customer requirements, and installed on land and various sea platforms, including warships such as missile boats, corvettes, frigates or destroyers.

The system includes four models of interceptors:

- Barak SR – A short-range interceptor of 15 km (9.3 mi).
- Barak MR – 35 km (22 mi) short and medium range interceptor (formerly known as MRAD).
- Barak LR – 70 km (43 mi) medium and long-range interceptor, sharing the same body with the MR with a dual-pulse rocket motor inside (formerly known as LRAD).
- Barak ER – An LR missile with a booster, has an extended range of 150 km (93 mi) and a maximum altitude of 30 km (98,000 ft).

Another proposed interceptor was displayed at the 2025 Paris Air Show:

- Barak EA – Variant with an extended booster, has a range of 250 km (160 mi) and a maximum altitude of more than 35 km (115,000 ft), also featuring an optical seeker.

== Development and testing ==
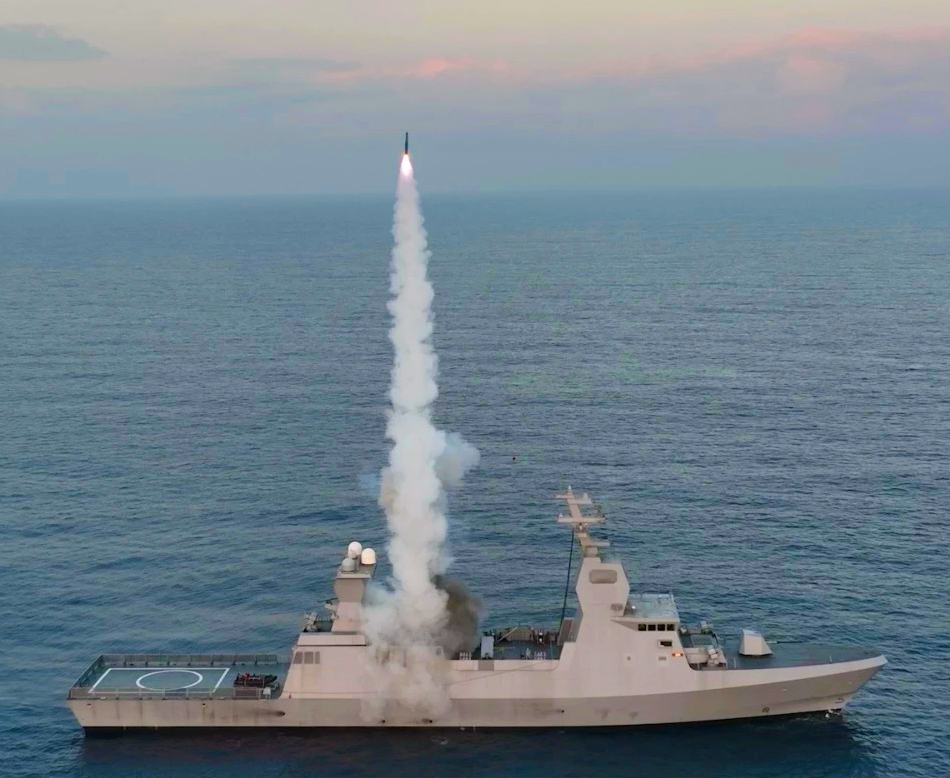
A Sa'ar 6-class ship launches a Barak LR interceptor during a test

On 22 March 2021, it was reported that a successful series of tests of the Barak ER version, capable of intercepting threats at a range of 150 km, had been completed.

On 30 November 2022, a successful test launch of an LR missile from an Israeli Navy Sa'ar 6-class ship was conducted, intercepting a target missile that resembled a cruise missile.

On 1 August 2024, a successful test of an LR interceptor launched from the Sa'ar 6 ship INS Atzmaut was completed.

== Operational activity ==
On 16 June 2025, during the Twelve-Day War between Israel and Iran, the first successful operational use of the Israeli Navy's system was reported to have intercepted UAVs launched from Iran. A land-based version of the system, known in the IDF as Barak, was operated by the Air Defense Division, and recorded its first interception on 19 June 2025.

== Operators ==
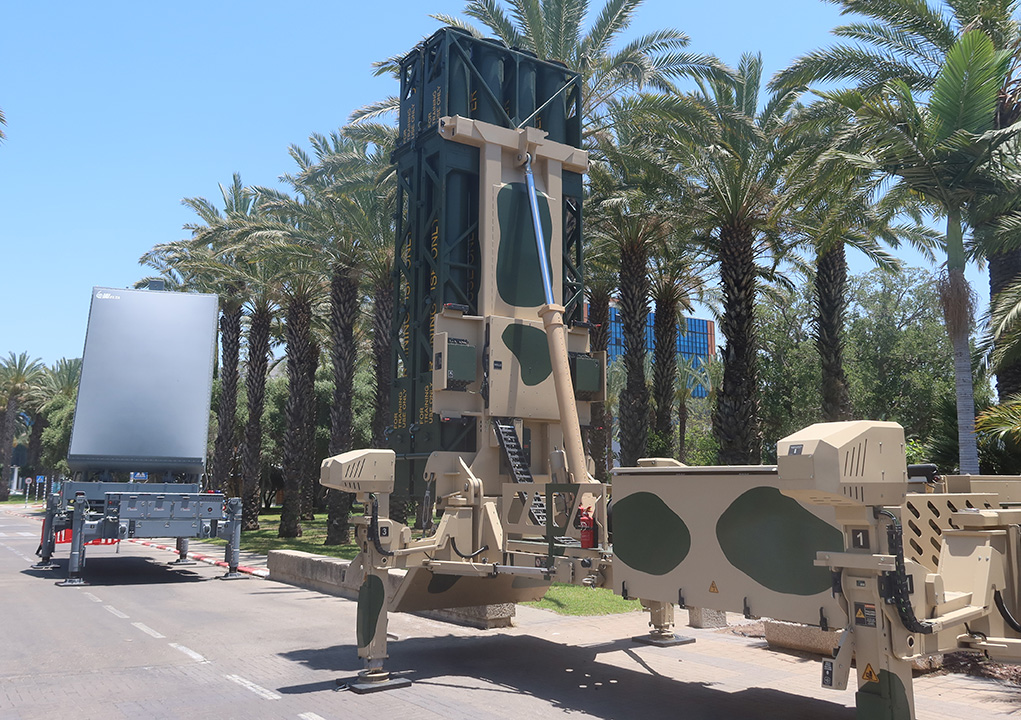
Stationary Barak MX fire unit and a deployed EL/M-2084 multi-mission radar

=== Current operators ===
- Azerbaijan: Ordered the system in 2023 in a $1.2 billion deal.
- Colombia: Ordered the system in 2023 in a deal worth $131 million, (Note: Eyal Bogoslavsky, Colombia Purchases Barak MX Missiles from IAI, Israel Defense, 2 January 2023) .Colombia received the first battery in November 2025. The remaining batteries are expected during 2026
- Cyprus: In December 2024, it was reported that it had at least 2 batteries of the system. In October 2026, it was reported by the Cypriot paper I Simerini that a third battery had been ordered by the government.
- Israel: Installed on the Sa'ar 6-class ships of the Israeli Navy, and named in the Navy "Barak Magen". The system was also used by the Air Defense System of the Air Force during the Operation Am Kalavi.
- Morocco: Ordered the system in 2022.
- Slovakia: In 2023, the Slovak government approved the purchase of 6 batteries. On 23 December 2024, the deal was signed with Israel Aerospace Industries to supply the systems for a total of 560 million euros (2 billion shekels). The first battery was delivered in April 2026, and is in service as of October 2026. The second battery should arrive by the end of 2026.

=== Future operators ===
- Greece: In August 2026, Greece ordered Barak MX, alongside SPYDER and David's Sling, as part of the Achilles' Shield layered air defense system.
- Netherlands: In September 2024, the Netherlands revealed plans to buy two Multifunctional Support Ships. These ships would be armed with containerized modules, with Barak ER missiles selected as one of the systems.
- Thailand: In December 2025, the Royal Thai Air Force signed a $108 million contract with Israel Aerospace Industries to acquire the Barak MX air and missile defense system.

== See also ==
- Related systems from the "Barak" series:
  - Barak 8 - the equivalent system produced in collaboration with DRDO from India
  - Barak 1 - The air defense system for vessels developed by Israel Aerospace Industries in collaboration with Rafael in service with the Israel Defense Forces (IDF)
- Additional Israeli air defense systems:
  - SPYDER - An air defense system manufactured by Rafael in collaboration with Israel Aerospace Industries.
  - David's Sling - a system manufactured by Rafael in collaboration with Israel Israel Aerospace Industries and Raytheon to intercept medium-long-range rockets and missiles.
  - Iron Dome - An Israeli system for intercepting short- and medium-range rockets and missiles. It is in service with the IDF.
  - C-Dome - The naval version of Iron Dome, installed on the Sa'ar 6-class ships.
  - Arrow - the ballistic missile defense system developed by Israel Aerospace Industries and the topmost layer of the State of Israel's multi-layered air defense and missile defense.
- Other air defense systems in the world:
  - MIM-104 Patriot - An American defense system for use against aircraft and ballistic missiles. It was in service with the IDF until July 2024.
  - RIM-161 Standard Missile 3 - American anti-missile missile launched from Aegis Ballistic Missile Defense System ships
  - S-300 missile system and S-400 missile system - Russian surface-to-air missile systems
  - S-500 missile system - Russian-made anti-ballistic missile
