= INS Lahav =

Sa'ar 5-class corvette of the Israeli Navy

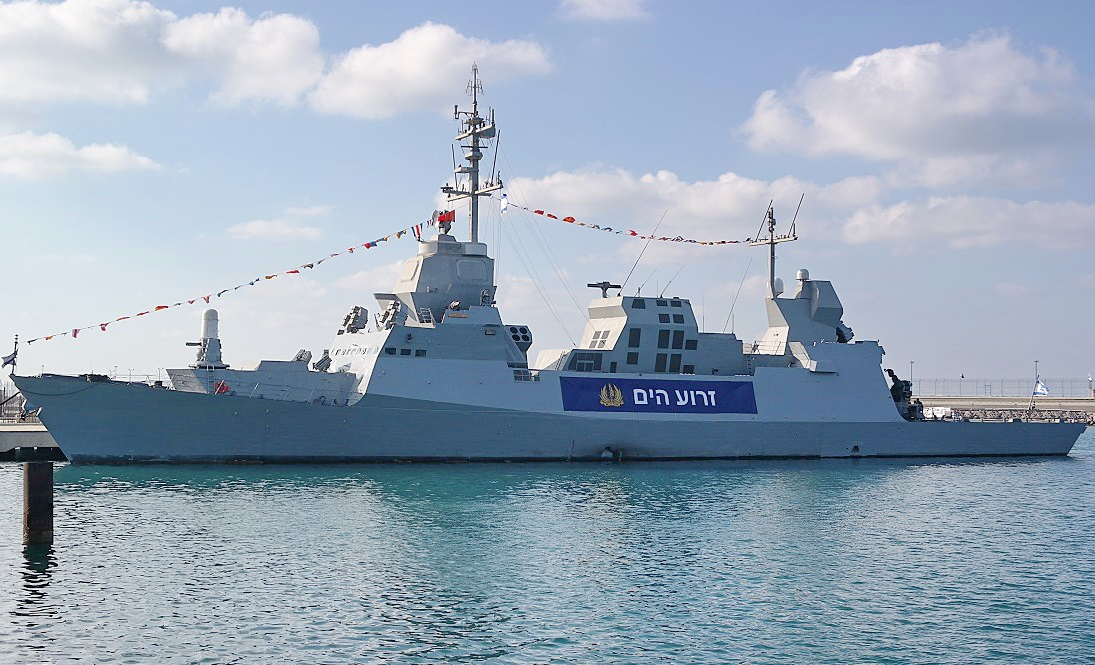
- INS Lahav with EL/M-2248 MF-STAR installed

History

Israel
- Name: Lahav
- Namesake: Blade
- Builder: Northrop Grumman by Ingalls Shipbuilding
- Launched: August 1993
- Commissioned: 23 September 1994
- Status: Active
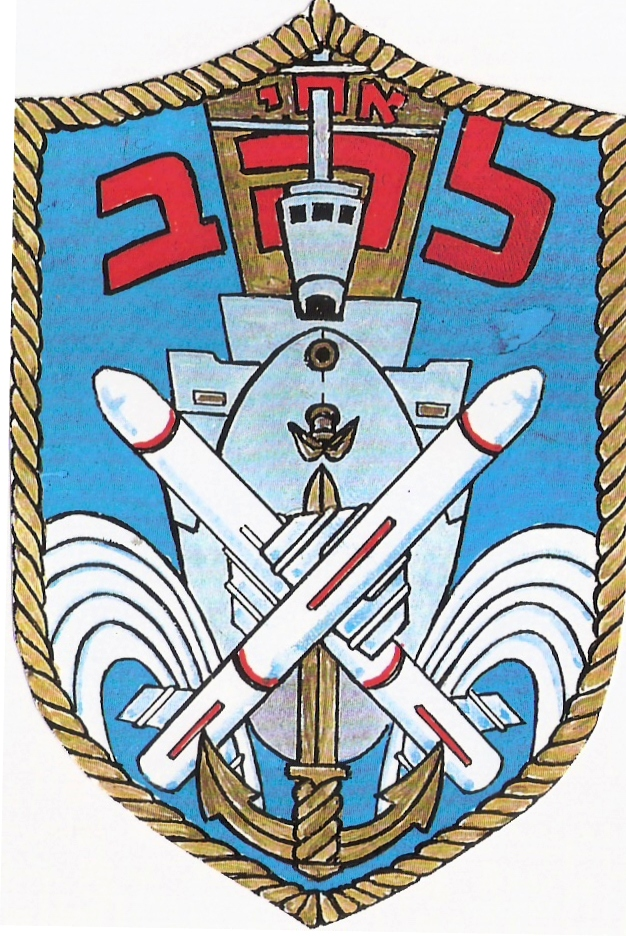
- Badge

General characteristics
- Class & type: Sa'ar 5-class corvette
- Displacement: 1,227 tonnes (full load); 1,075 tonnes (standard)
- Length: 85.64 m (280.97 ft)
- Beam: 11.88 m (38.98 ft)
- Draft: 3.17 m (10.40 ft)
- Propulsion: Combined Diesel or Gas; 2 MTU V12 1163 TB82 diesel engines; General Electric LM2500 gas turbine
- Speed: 20 knots (37 km/h) (diesel engines); 33 knots (61 km/h) (gas turbine)
- Range: 3,500 nautical miles (6,500 km)
- Complement: 64 officers and crewmen; 10 aircrew
- Sensors & processing systems: EL/M-2248 MF-STAR; Elta EL/M-2221 fire-control radar; EDO Type 796 sonar; Rafael towed sonar array
- Electronic warfare & decoys: Argon ST AN/SLQ-25 Nixie decoy; Elbit chaff rocket launchers; Rafael RF corner reflector; Elisra NS-9003A/9005 RWR
- Armament: 1 20mm Phalanx CIWS; 8 RGM-84 Harpoon anti-ship missiles; 64 Barak 8 surface-to-air missiles; 2 Mark 32 SVTTs (6 tubes)
- Aircraft carried: Eurocopter Panther
- Aviation facilities: Helipad and helicopter hangar

INS Lahav (502) (translated as 'blade') is a Sa'ar 5-class corvette of the Israeli Navy's 3rd Flotilla that was built by Northrop Grumman Ship Systems in 1993. She is one of three Sa'ar 5-class corvettes in service with the Israeli Navy and her homeport is Haifa.

The contract for the construction of the three ships of the class was signed in the early 1980s. Lahav was the second ship of the class to be launched in 1993 and she was commissioned in September 1994. Lahav took part in the 2006 Lebanon War by blockading Lebanese ports. She has also taken part in numerous NATO exercises including one in April 2008 with the Turkish and American navies.

It took part in the 2010 Gaza flotilla raid.

The Israeli Navy chose Lahav as the first Sa'ar 5 corvette to be equipped with the advanced EL/M-2248 MF-STAR radar. On 23 September 2014 she was presented to the public with the new radar at Haifa naval base.

It was reported in July 2026 that Lahav had undergone an extensive overhaul at the Navy's shipyard in Haifa, intended to bring its capabilities upto a similar level as the new Sa'ar 6-class corvettes. The project involved a comprehensive rebuild of the ship's systems including radar, sonar, computing, navigation, and communications. Notably the upgrade adds an integrated C-Dome missile system, the navalized variant of the Iron Dome, for greater anti-air protection. With a total value of approximately $82M (NIS 250M), the modifications were expected to extend the ship's service life by at least another 15 years.
