= Commander of the Israeli Navy =

Head and highest-ranking officer

- מפקד זרוע הים

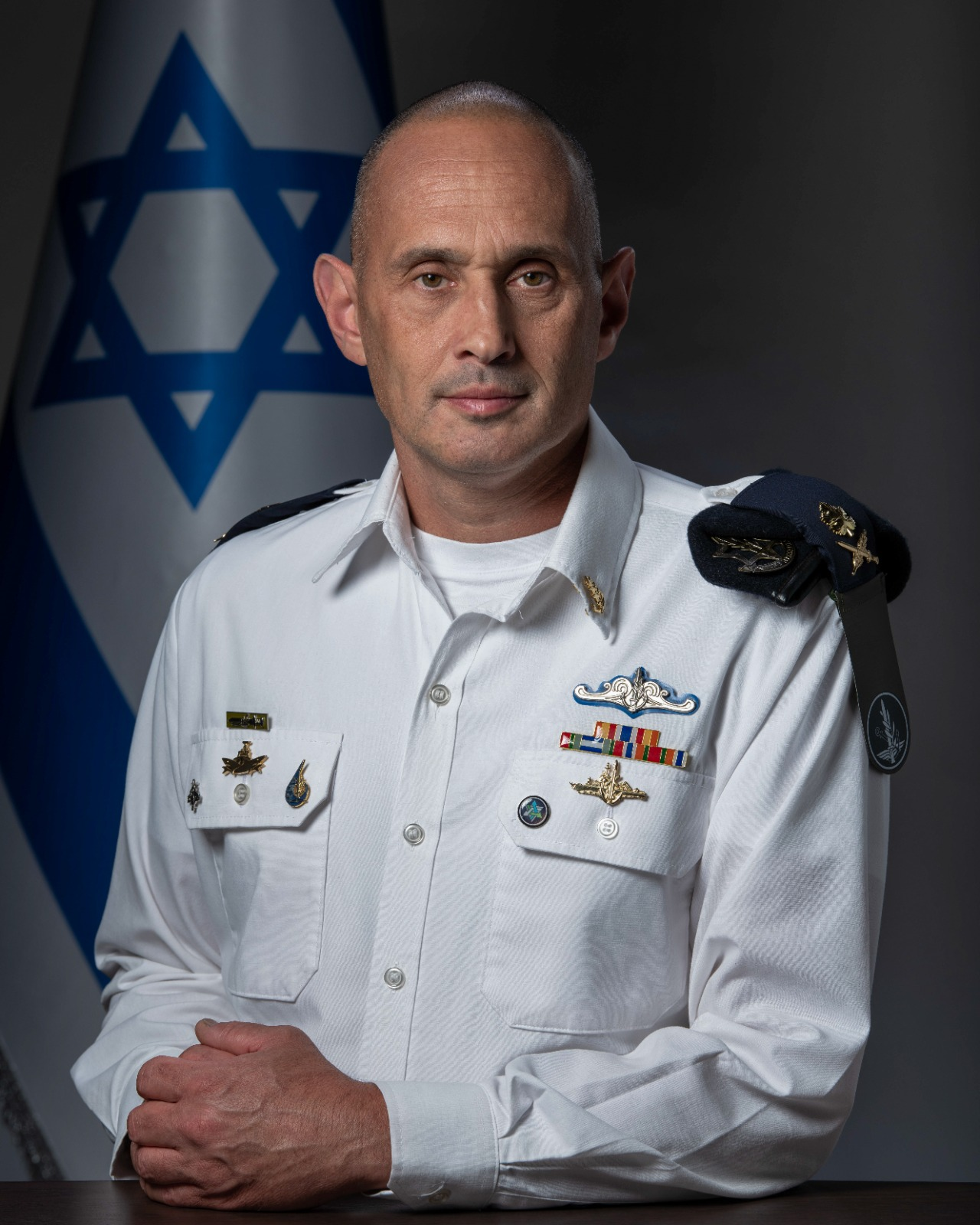
- Incumbent; Vice admiral Eyal Harel since 16 April 2026
- Israeli Navy
- Member of: General Staff of the IDF
- Reports to: Chief of the General Staff
- Appointer: Chief of the General Staff
- Formation: 17 March 1948
- First holder: Gershon Zak
- Website: www.idf.il/en/minisites/general-staff/

The Commander of the Israeli Navy is the head and highest-ranking officer of the Israeli Navy, and is responsible for overall operations of the navy. The current Commander is Vice Admiral Eyal Harel.

== List of officeholders ==
No.	Picture	Name	Took office	Left office	Time in office	Ref.
1	Gershon Zak	Gershon Zak (1913–1989)	17 March 1948	April 1949	1 year	
2	Paul Shulman	Paul Shulman (1922–1994)	April 1949	May 1949	1 month	
3	Shlomo Shamir	Aluf; Shlomo Shamir (1915–2009)	May 1949	December 1950	1 year, 7 months	
4	Mordechai Limon	Aluf; Mordechai Limon (1924–2009)	14 December 1950	30 June 1954	3 years, 6 months	
5	Shmuel Tankus	Aluf; Shmuel Tankus (1914–2012)	1 July 1954	1960	5–6 years	
6	Yohai Ben-Nun	Aluf; Yohai Ben-Nun (1924–1994)	1960	1966	5–6 years	
7	Shlomo Erell	Aluf; Shlomo Erell (1920–2018)	January 1966	September 1968	2 years, 8 months	
8	Avraham Botzer	Aluf; Avraham Botzer (1929–2012)	September 1968	1 September 1972	4 years	
9	Benjamin Telem	Aluf; Benjamin Telem (1928–2008)	1 September 1972	1976	3–4 years	
10	Michael Barkai	Aluf; Michael Barkai (1935–1999)	1976	10 January 1979	2–3 years	
11	Ze'ev Almog	Aluf; Ze'ev Almog (born 1935)	10 January 1979	February 1985	6 years	
12	Avraham Ben-Shoshan	Aluf; Avraham Ben-Shoshan (born 1940)	February 1985	1989	3–4 years	
13	Micha Ram	Aluf; Micha Ram (1942–2018)	1989	1992	2–3 years	
14	Ami Ayalon	Aluf; Ami Ayalon (born 1945)	1992	1995	2–3 years	
15	Alex Tal	Aluf; Alex Tal (born 1946)	1995	1999	3–4 years	
16	Yedidya Ya'ari	Aluf; Yedidya Ya'ari (born 1947)	1999	September 2004	4–5 years	
17	David Ben-Besht	Aluf; David Ben-Besht (born 1950)	September 2004	2007	2–3 years	
18	Eli Marom	Aluf; Eli Marom (born 1955)	2007	2011	3–4 years	
19	Ram Rothberg	Aluf; Ram Rothberg (born 1964)	10 October 2011	12 September 2016	4 years, 11 months	
20	Eli Sharvit	Aluf; Eli Sharvit (born 1964)	12 September 2016	2 September 2021	4 years, 11 months	
21	David Saar Salama	Aluf; David Saar Salama (born 1969)	2 September 2021	16 April 2026	4 years, 7 months	
22	Eyal Harel	Aluf; Eyal Harel (born 1974)	16 April 2026	Incumbent	4 months	

== See also ==
- Commander of the Israeli Ground Forces
- Commander of the Israeli Air Force
