= Sa'ar 5-class corvette =

Class of Israeli Navy small corvettes

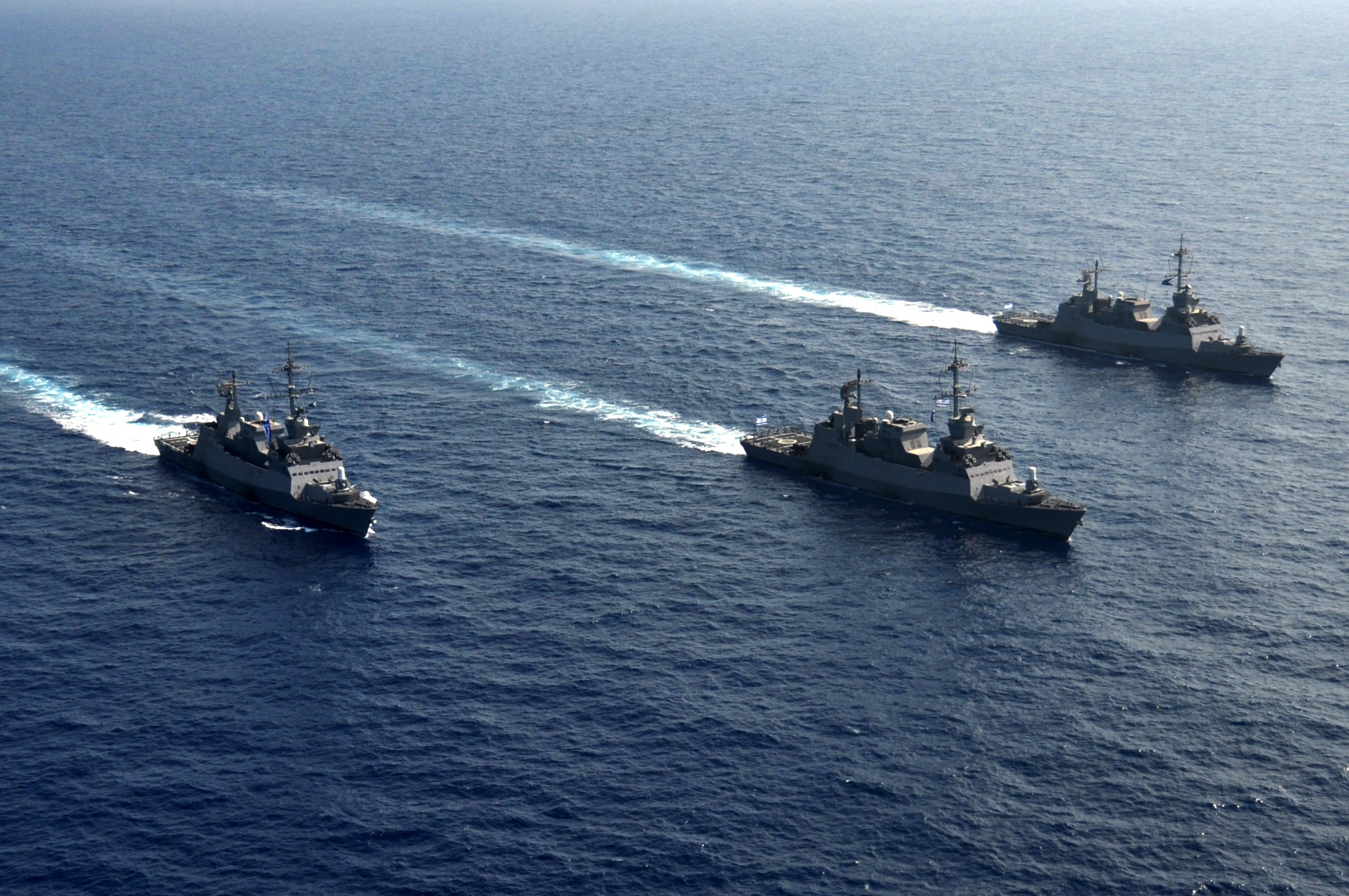
- The Sa'ar 5-class corvettes cruise off the shore of Israel during a training exercise

Class overview
- Name: Sa'ar 5 class
- Builders: Northrop Grumman by Ingalls Shipbuilding
- Operators: Israeli Navy
- Preceded by: Sa'ar 4.5 class
- Succeeded by: Sa'ar 6 class
- Cost: $260 million each
- In service: From 1 February 1993
- Completed: 3
- Active: 3

General characteristics
- Type: Corvette
- Displacement: 1,275 tonnes (full load); 1,065 tonnes (standard)
- Length: 85.64 m (280.97 ft)
- Beam: 11.88 m (38.98 ft)
- Draft: 3.45 m (11.32 ft)
- Propulsion: Combined Diesel or Gas; 2 MTU V12 1163 TB82 diesel engines; General Electric LM2500 gas turbine
- Speed: 20 knots (37 km/h) (diesel engines); 33 knots (61 km/h) (gas turbine)
- Range: 3,500 nautical miles (6,500 km)
- Complement: 64 officers and crewmen; 10 aircrew
- Sensors & processing systems: AAW & SuW: EL/M-2258 ALPHA rotating AESA S-band multifunction radar (upgrade version for Eilat & Hanit) EL/M 2248 MF-STAR fixed 4-faced AESA S-band multifunction radar (upgrade version for Lahav) Elta EL/M-2221 fire-control radar Elta EL/M-2218S air search radar (removed) ASW: EDO Type-796 hull-mounted sonar Rafael towed sonar array
- Electronic warfare & decoys: Argon ST AN/SLQ-25 Nixie towed torpedo decoys; Elbit Deseaver rocket decoy launchers; Rafael RF corner reflector; Elisra NS-9003A/9005 RWR
- Armament: Missiles: 2 x quad launchers for Harpoon anti-ship missiles 1 x 32-cell vertical launching system for Barak surface-to-air missiles Guns: 1 x 20mm (0.8 in) Phalanx CIWS 2 x 25mm (0.98 in) Typhoon Weapon Station [formerly occupied by 2 x 20mm (0.8 in) autocannons] Torpedoes: 2 x 324mm (12.75 in) Mark 32 torpedoes Aircraft: 1 helicopter - Eurocopter AS565 Panther

Sa'ar 5 (Hebrew: סַעַר, lit. 'storm') is a class of Israeli Navy corvettes. They were Israeli designed using lessons learned from the Sa'ar 4.5-class missile boats. Three Sa'ar 5 ships were built by Huntington Ingalls Industries (formerly Litton-Ingalls Shipbuilding Corporation of Pascagoula, Mississippi) for the Israeli Navy, based on Israeli designs.

They were the largest surface warships in Israel's surface naval fleet, although the Sa'ar 6-class corvette now being deployed are considerably larger. Although classified as "corvettes" due to their small size, only 71 crew, and limited loiter time, their weaponry are almost comparable to that of a frigate. They are equipped with sonar, 2 triple torpedoes, 2 quadruple missile launchers, electronic warfare capabilities and decoys, a Close-in weapon system, 2 autocannons and a helipad and helicopter hangar.

The first of class, INS Eilat, was launched in February 1993, followed by INS Lahav in August 1993 and INS Hanit in March 1994.

== Combat history ==
On 14 July 2006 during the 2006 Lebanon War, INS Hanit was struck by a Hezbollah-fired C-802 missile while patrolling 8.5 nm offshore of Beirut; the missile was Chinese-built with an upgraded Iranian radar seeker. The missile hit the corvette's unstealthy crane near the rear helicopter pad; the explosion holed the pad, set fire to fuel storage, and killed four crewmembers. The fire was extinguished after four hours and Hanit returned to Ashdod under its own power for three weeks of repairs.

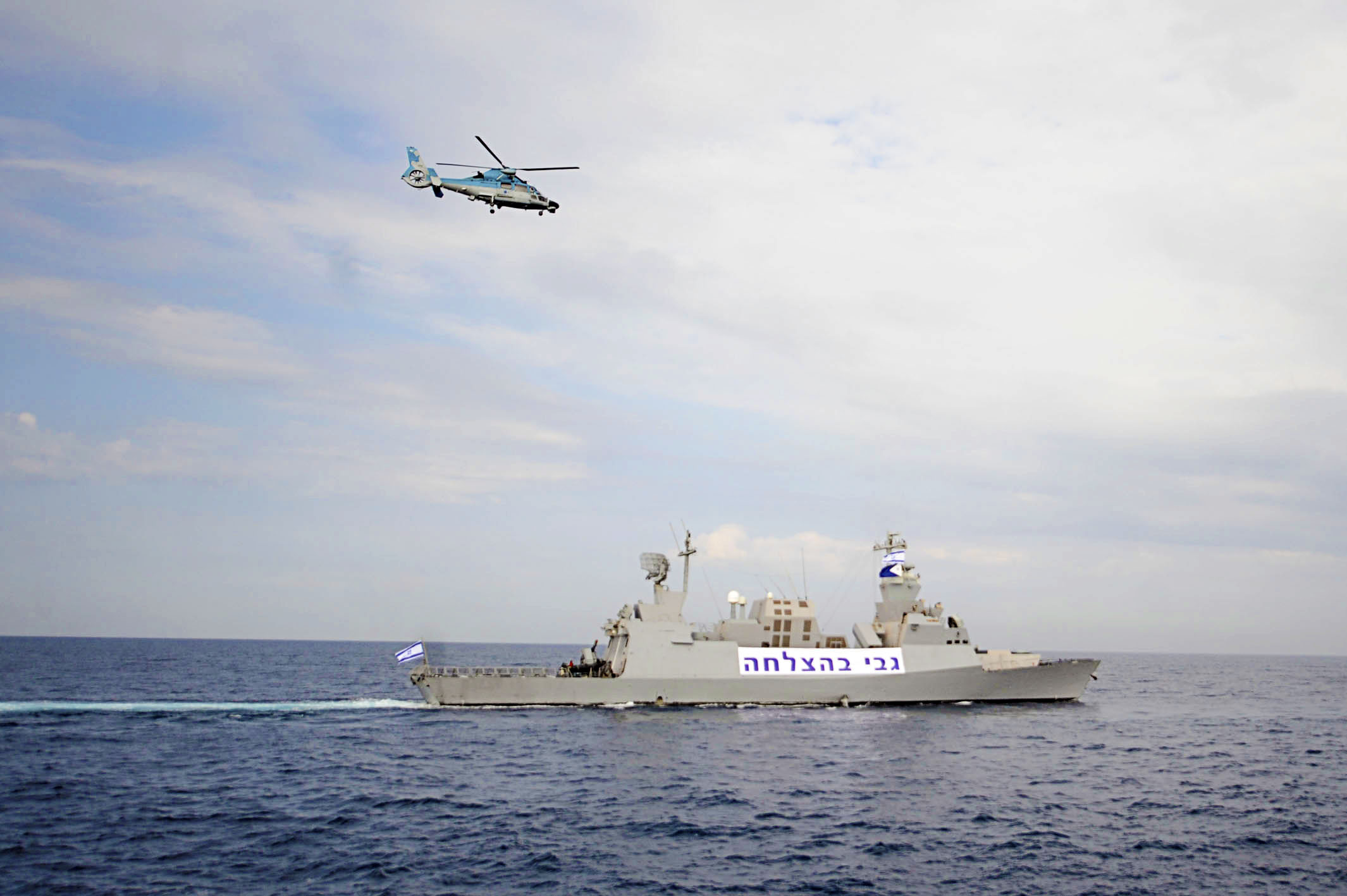
IAF Eurocopter AS565, the type of helicopter used on the Sa'ar 5 class

The ship's radar system was not fully functional at the time, and both the ECM and the Barak anti-missile systems were in a two-minute stand-by mode. An officer ordered that the anti-missile defenses be switched off about an hour prior to the attack without notifying the captain. The decision took into account intelligence assessments that Hezbollah did not have the capability to hit Israeli warships. The partial sensor shutdowns were known by the officer responsible, but the captain was not informed.

In August 2009 INS Eilat and INS Hanit passed through the Suez Canal into the Red Sea, along with a Dolphin-class submarine. The move was seen as a possible warning to Iran.

On 31 May 2010 INS Lahav and INS Hanit participated in the Gaza flotilla raid, meant to stop a convoy of ships from breaching the blockade of the Gaza Strip, along with the missile boat INS Nitzachon. The Israeli navy killed nine Turkish activists who were on board.

== Ships ==
Three ships of the Sa'ar 5 class have been built:

- INS Eilat, launched February 1993
- INS Lahav, launched August 1993
- INS Hanit, launched March 1994

The ships' missile systems include: (i) anti-air capability with 1 x 32-cell vertical launch system (although it is possible to carry another), with Barak-1 and/or Barak-8 missiles of IAI and Rafael, and two four-cell Boeing Harpoon missile launchers.

Ship's guns are a Raytheon / General Dynamics MK15 Phalanx 20mm close-in weapon system (CIWS). Secondary guns include a pair of 25mm Typhoon Weapon Station.

The main radar for the 1st and 3rd ship (INS Eilat and INS Hanit) is the Advanced Lightweight Phased Array (ALPHA) ELM-2258 by Elta, an AESA S-band multifunction rotating radar, with automatic track initiation at +120 km (for fighters) and +25 km (for missiles).

The main radar for the 2nd ship INS Lahav is the micro-AEGIS-style four-fixed-paneled S-band radar. In 2014 September 23, she was presented to the public with that new radar at Haifa naval base.

For undersea warfare, the EDO Corporation's Type-796 hull-mounted search-and-attack sonar.

Electronic warfare includes an AN/SLQ-25 Nixie towed torpedo decoy system, a radar warning receiver Elisra NS-9003/9005, and three Elbit Deseaver chaff decoys.

== See also ==
- Sa'ar 4-class missile boat
- Sa'ar 4.5-class missile boat
- Israeli Navy
