= INS Eilat (501) =

Sa'ar 5-class corvette of the Israeli Navy

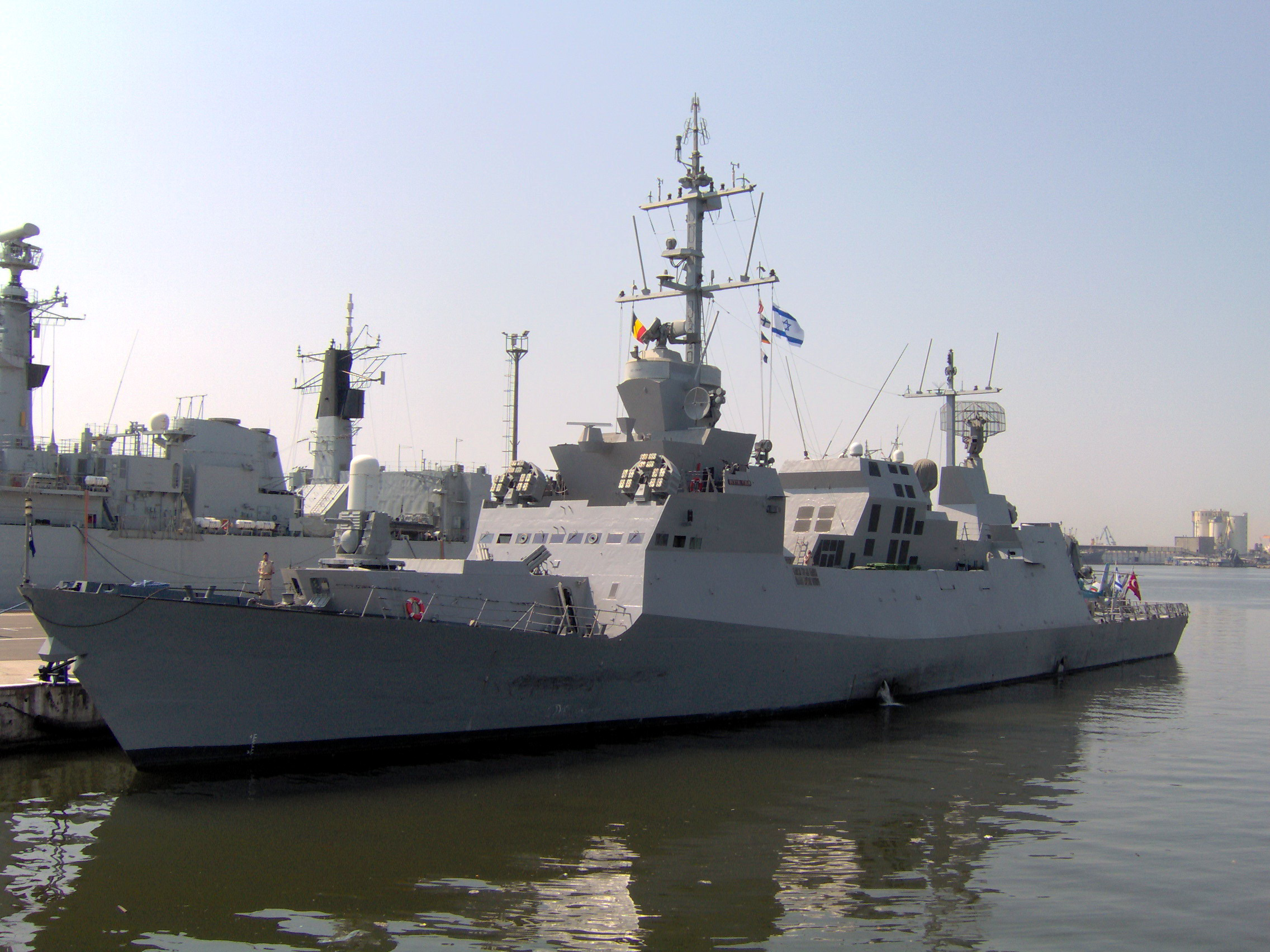
- INS Eilat

History

Israel
- Name: Eilat
- Builder: Northrop Grumman by Ingalls Shipbuilding
- Launched: February 1993
- Commissioned: 21 May 1994
- Status: Active
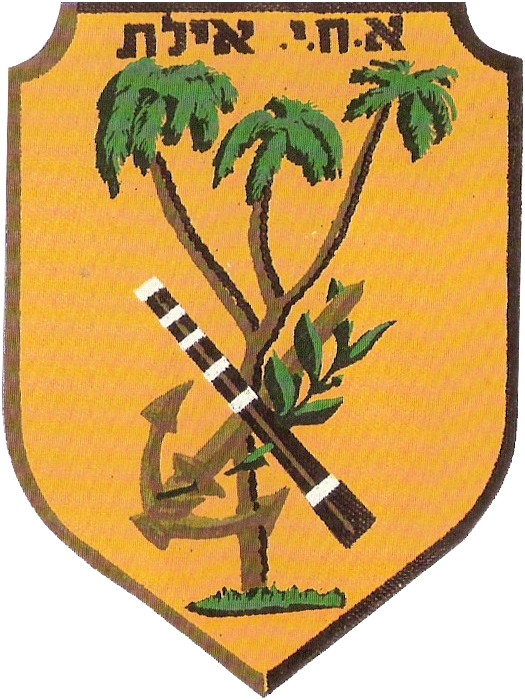
- Badge

General characteristics
- Class & type: Sa'ar 5-class corvette
- Displacement: 1,227 tonnes (full load); 1,075 tonnes (standard)
- Length: 85.64 m (280.97 ft)
- Beam: 11.88 m (38.98 ft)
- Draft: 3.17 m (10.40 ft)
- Propulsion: Combined Diesel or Gas; 2 MTU V12 1163 TB82 diesel engines; General Electric LM2500 gas turbine
- Speed: 20 knots (37 km/h) (diesel engines); 33 knots (61 km/h) (gas turbine)
- Range: 3,500 nautical miles (6,500 km)
- Complement: 64 officers and crewmen; 10 aircrew
- Sensors & processing systems: Elta EL/M-2218S air search radar; Elta EL/M-2221 fire-control radar; EDO Type 796 sonar; Rafael towed sonar array
- Electronic warfare & decoys: Argon ST AN/SLQ-25 Nixie decoy; Elbit chaff rocket launchers; Rafael RF corner reflector; Elisra NS-9003A/9005 RWR
- Armament: 1 20mm Phalanx CIWS; 8 RGM-84 Harpoon anti-ship missiles; 64 Barak 1 surface-to-air missiles; 2 Mark 32 SVTTs (6 tubes)
- Aircraft carried: Eurocopter Panther
- Aviation facilities: Helipad and helicopter hangar

INS Eilat (501) is a Sa'ar 5-class corvette of the Israeli Navy's 3rd Flotilla that was built by Northrop Grumman Ship Systems in 1993. She is one of three Sa'ar 5-class corvettes in service with the Israeli Navy and her homeport is Haifa, Israel. The contract for the construction of the three ships of the class was signed in the early 1980s. Eilat was the first of the three ships to be launched and commissioned, being the first in her class.
