= INS Hanit =

Sa'ar 5-class corvette of the Israeli Navy

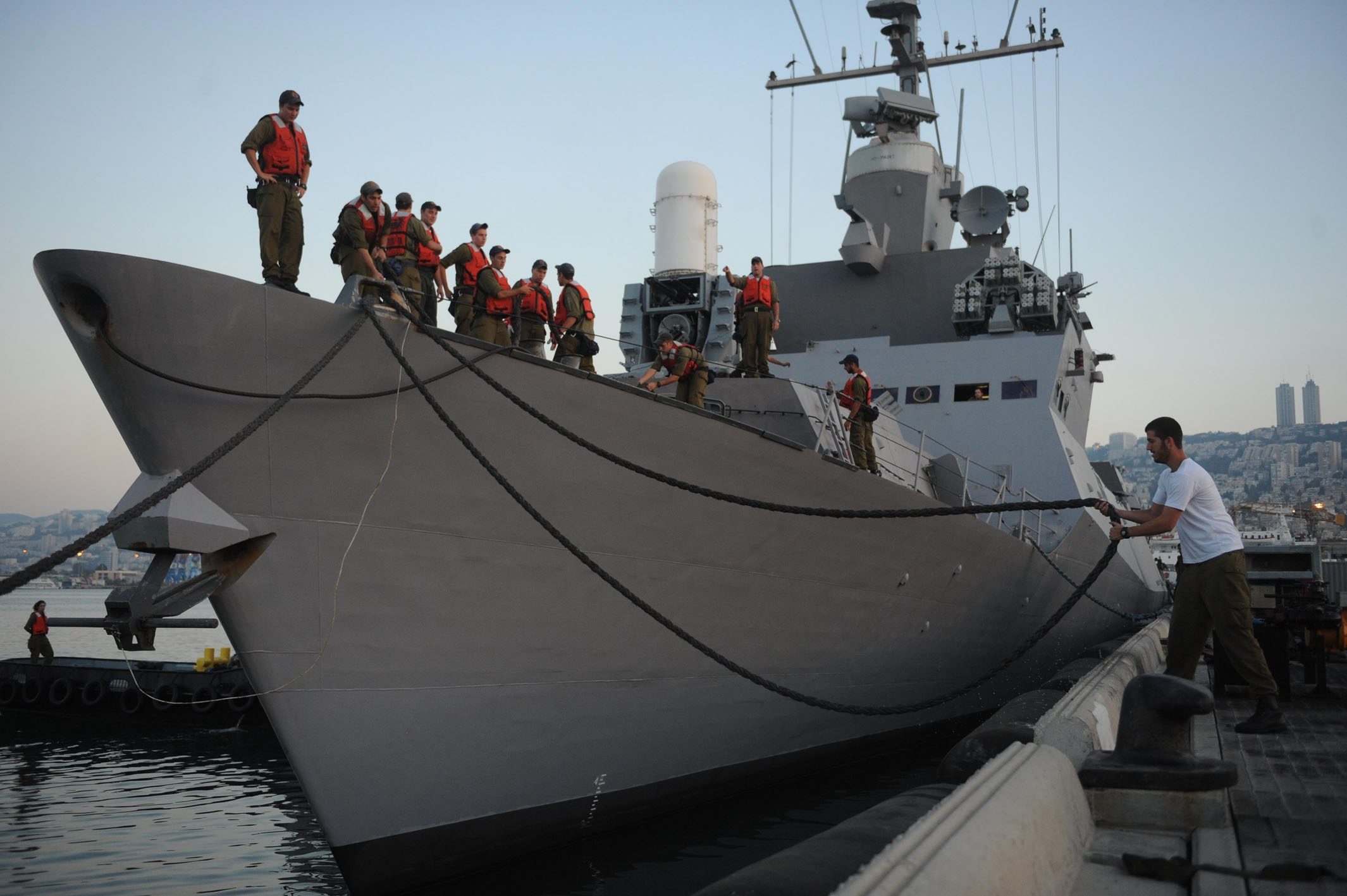
- INS Hanit at Haifa port, May 2010

History

Israel
- Name: Hanit
- Namesake: Spear
- Builder: Northrop Grumman by Ingalls Shipbuilding
- Laid down: 5 April 1993
- Launched: 5 March 1994
- Commissioned: 7 February 1995
- Status: Active
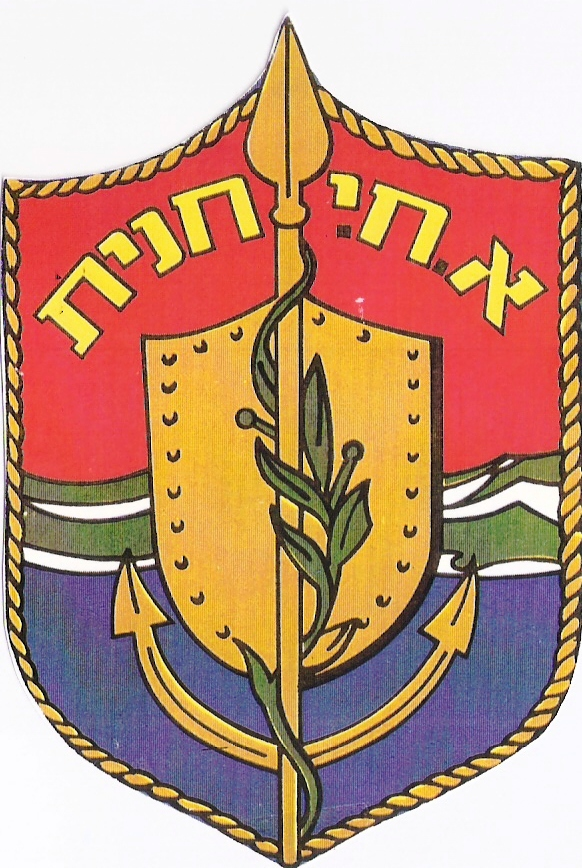
- Badge

General characteristics
- Class & type: Sa'ar 5-class corvette
- Displacement: 1,275 tonnes (full load); 1,065 tonnes (standard)
- Length: 85.64 m (280.97 ft)
- Beam: 11.88 m (38.98 ft)
- Draft: 3.45 m (11.32 ft)
- Propulsion: Combined Diesel or Gas; 2 MTU V12 1163 TB82 diesel engines; General Electric LM2500 gas turbine
- Speed: 20 knots (37 km/h) (diesel engines); 33 knots (61 km/h) (gas turbine)
- Range: 3,500 nautical miles (6,500 km)
- Complement: 64 officers and crewmen; 10 aircrew
- Sensors & processing systems: Elta EL/M-2218S air search radar; Elta EL/M-2221 fire-control radar; EDO Type 796 hull-mounted sonar; Rafael towed sonar array
- Electronic warfare & decoys: Argon ST AN/SLQ-25 Nixie decoy; Elbit chaff rocket launchers; Rafael RF corner reflector; Elisra NS-9003A/9005 RWR
- Armament: 1 20mm Phalanx CIWS; 8 RGM-84 Harpoon anti-ship missiles; 64 Barak 1 surface-to-air missiles; 2 Mark 32 SVTTs (6 tubes)
- Aircraft carried: Eurocopter Panther
- Aviation facilities: Helipad and helicopter hangar

INS Hanit (503) (Hebrew: חנית, Spear) is a Sa'ar 5-class corvette of the Israeli Navy's 3rd Flotilla, built by Northrop Grumman Ship Systems in 1994. During the 2006 Lebanon War INS Hanit served as the flagship of the Israeli navy. On 14 July 2006, it was damaged after being struck by a Hezbollah C-701 anti-ship missile.

== Attack on 14 July 2006 ==
During the 2006 Lebanon War, the vessel was patrolling in Lebanese waters ten nautical miles off the coast of Beirut. It was damaged on 14 July 2006 on the waterline, under the aft superstructure by a missile (likely a Chinese-designed C-802) fired by Hezbollah that reportedly set the flight deck on fire and crippled the propulsion systems inside the hull. However, INS Hanit stayed afloat, withdrew and made the rest of the journey back to Ashdod port for repairs under its own power. Four crew members were killed during the attack: Staff Sergeant Tal Amgar, Corporal Shai Atas, Sergeant Yaniv Hershkovitz, and First Sergeant Dov Steinshuss.

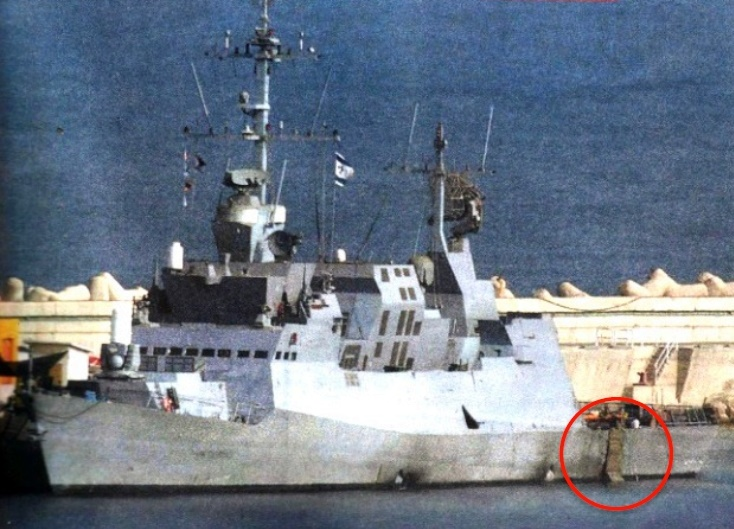
INS Hanit after the attack

According to the Israeli Navy, the ship's sophisticated automatic missile defense system was not deployed, even though the early warning system is usually deployed during peace-time wargames. In the aftermath of the event, reports suggested that no known intelligence existed which would have pointed to the fact that such a sophisticated missile was deployed in Lebanon by Hezbollah. In fact, the investigative work of Ha'aretz journalists Amos Harel and Avi Issacharoff showed that an intelligence officer identified only as Colonel K. had given a lecture on 21 April 2003, predicting that Hezbollah possessed shore-to-sea missiles. Furthermore, on the morning of 14 July 2006 a branch head of naval intelligence described as Lieutenant-Colonel Y. briefed the head of naval intelligence, Colonel Ram Rothberg, telling him that "ships enforcing Israel's naval blockade on Hezbollah should take into account the possibility of a C-802 missile being fired on them." No warning was issued based on this assessment, however; if it had, Israeli ships would have moved further away from the shore and activated their anti-missile systems.

According to Robert H. Stoner, GMCM (SW)(Ret), one C-802 missile was used, with this missile missing the Hanit, with it flying above it, hitting another ship 30 miles away from the shore. The smaller missile, (estimated warhead: 30 kg) that hit Hanit was a C-701, launched at the same time with a lower flight path. On 17 July 2006, a press conference was made about the employ of those two different missiles, believed to be both Iranian copies of the original Chinese missiles

As a result of the incident, two navy officers, two junior officers and the commander of the ship were formally reprimanded and repositioned to non-commanding positions on land. One of the junior officers had shut down the central radar and parts of the defence system without notifying the commander, in the belief that the ship was not under threat.

=== IDF report ===
An official IDF report on the Lebanon war incident reveals that the crew did not act sufficiently in order to anticipate the threat.

The IDF report, which was submitted to Chief of Staff Dan Halutz, said, "as far as the intelligence picture is concerned, it was found that despite the lack of pinpoint information about the weapon in the hands of Hezbollah, there was information in the Navy in the past that could have led to some type of an assessment that the enemy holds shore-to-ship missiles." In addition, failures were uncovered in "the way the forces understood the operative reality and implemented it." As there were no perceived missile threats, an officer had left the ship's anti-missile suite disabled, in energy-saving standby-mode, while patrolling near the coast.

The Israeli military alleged that Iranian military advisors from the Islamic Revolutionary Guard Corps (IRGC) had assisted with deploying and readying the missile launcher.

== Subsequent service ==
Repairs took months; the ship returned to active service in 2007.

INS Hanit served as Ram Rothberg's command ship during the 2014 Operation Full Disclosure.

It was deployed during the Red Sea crisis following Houthi attacks on Israel.
