= Shlomo Erell =

Israeli Navy general (1920–2018)

- שלמה אראל
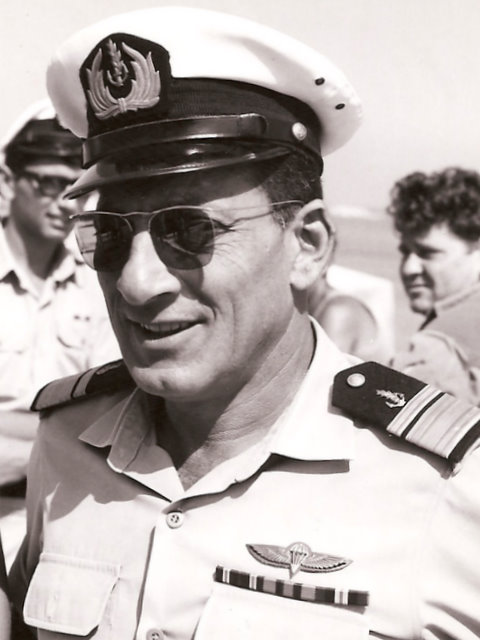
- Born: 20 November 1920; Łódź, Poland
- Died: 20 November 2018 (aged 98); Tel Aviv, Israel
- Military career
- Allegiance: United Kingdom (1939–1948); Israel (1948–1968)
- Branch: Merchant Navy (1939–1948); Israeli Navy (1948–1968)
- Service years: 1939–1968
- Rank: Aluf
- Commands: Captain of the INS Palmach; Captain of the INS Misgav; IDF military attaché at the Israeli embassy in Italy; Commander of the Israeli Navy's destroyer fleet Commander of the Israeli Navy
- Conflicts: World War II; 1947–1949 Palestine war; Suez Crisis; Six-Day War; War of Attrition
- Other work: Member of the Likud party

Shlomo Erell (Hebrew: שלמה אראל; 20 November 1920 – 20 November 2018) was an Israeli military officer who was a Major General in the Israel Defense Forces (IDF), and the seventh Commander of the Israeli Navy.

Among the first recruits of the nascent Israeli Navy, Erell commanded the Palmach patrol boat during the 1948 Palestine war, leading an attack on the German aviso Grille near Lebanon. After the war, he rose up the ranks of the IDF, taking several command roles in the Navy and serving as Israel's military attaché to several European countries. He played a key role in the development of Israel's missile boats, convincing German shipbuilders to send modified Jaguar-class fast attack craft to Israel which were later converted to missile boats.

He was appointed Commander of the Israeli Navy in 1966. During his term, he oversaw the Navy's activities in the Six-Day War and the opening of the War of Attrition. Three major naval disasters occurred under his tenure, namely the sinking of the INS Eilat by Egypt, the USS Liberty incident, and the disappearance of the INS Dakar. He retired from the IDF in 1968, joining the Likud party and serving as an advisor for Israeli officials on naval affairs.

== Early life ==
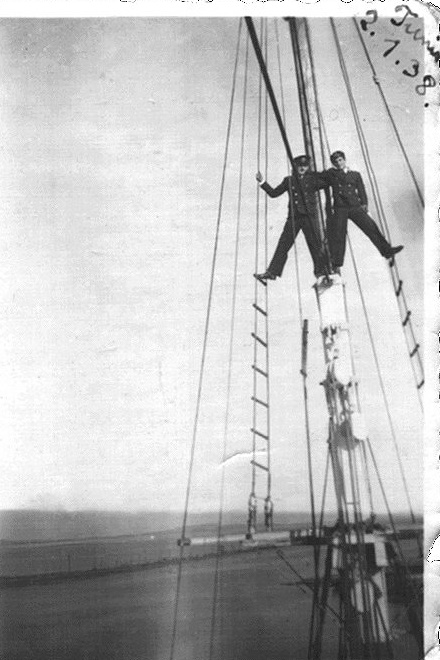
Shlomo Erell, right, as a student of the Betar Naval Academy, on the mast of the training ship Sarah I in Tunisia, 1938

Erell was born as Shlomo Engel in Łódź, Poland, on 20 November 1920 to Haim, a wealthy businessman, and Frida Engel. The family immigrated to Mandatory Palestine in 1927 and settled in Petah Tikva. Haim was killed in a car accident shortly after they arrived, and Erell's family then moved to Tel Aviv, where he was raised solely by his mother. Erell attended Geula High School and joined the Betar youth movement. At 16, Erell established a small underground organization with school friends called Brit Noar Hameri, which aimed to expel the British from Palestine. He later recounted his experience in an interview, stating: "We believed that we should do something [against the British Mandate]. So, we stole some pistols… we threw a few bombs… it was all very childish". The group was disbanded shortly after.

Between 1936 and 1938, Erell attended the Betar Naval Academy in Civitavecchia, Italy. After graduating, he was hired as a sailor on an Italian rescue ship. When he returned in 1938, he was arrested for his past anti-British activities and held at Acre Prison for six months. He was released after serving his sentence on the condition that he left Palestine. He then left for Paris, from where he was sent to work at the Port of Antwerp and later a Belgian shipyard.

== Military career ==
=== World War II ===
With the outbreak of World War II, Erell joined the British Merchant Navy, which was responsible for supplying the United Kingdom with food, materials, ammunition, and fuel, in December 1939. He participated in convoy runs during the Battle of the Atlantic. In January 1941, he survived a torpedo attack on his ship by a German U-boat. Erell managed to enter a lifeboat, where he spent nine days with several other sailors before being rescued. After recovering from his injuries, he continued sailing. When a ship he was sailing on entered the Suez Canal area, he caught a train from Egypt to Palestine and returned home. He then began working on coastal ships in the Mediterranean Sea and married in December 1941. After the Palestine Police Force discovered that he had returned he was interrogated by the Criminal Investigations Department and prevented from resuming his career with the Merchant Navy.

In 1944, he was hired to direct naval cargo at a factory belonging to the Palestine Potash Company at what is now the Dead Sea Works, where he and his family lived until it was evacuated during the 1948 Palestine War.

=== 1948 Palestine war ===
Erell joined the Israeli Navy in May 1948, being among its first recruits. He commanded the INS Palmach patrol ship during the war, which was involved in operations that included raids behind enemy lines in the northern Sinai Peninsula, the transportation of agents to the coast of Beirut, and shelling of the Gaza Strip.

In November 1948, the German aviso Grille, which had previously served as Adolf Hitler's yacht, was discovered by Israeli intelligence to be docking off the coast of Beirut. Believing that the Lebanese intended to arm the vessel and use it to attack Haifa, a plan codenamed Operation David (Hebrew: מבצע דוד) was drafted to sink the ship, where Erell would sail the Palmach to Beirut and drop off a diver, who would sink the boat using explosives. The operation was launched at night. Erell dropped off the man, who attached two mines to Grille's waistline before returning to the Palmach, which then returned to Israel. The attack caused limited damage, only leaving a hole in its hull that was later repaired.

In April 1949, during Operation Uvda, Erell commanded a naval force from the Alexandroni Brigade that captured Ein Gedi, establishing the Judaean Desert armistice border. By the end of the war, he commanded the corvette INS Haganah.

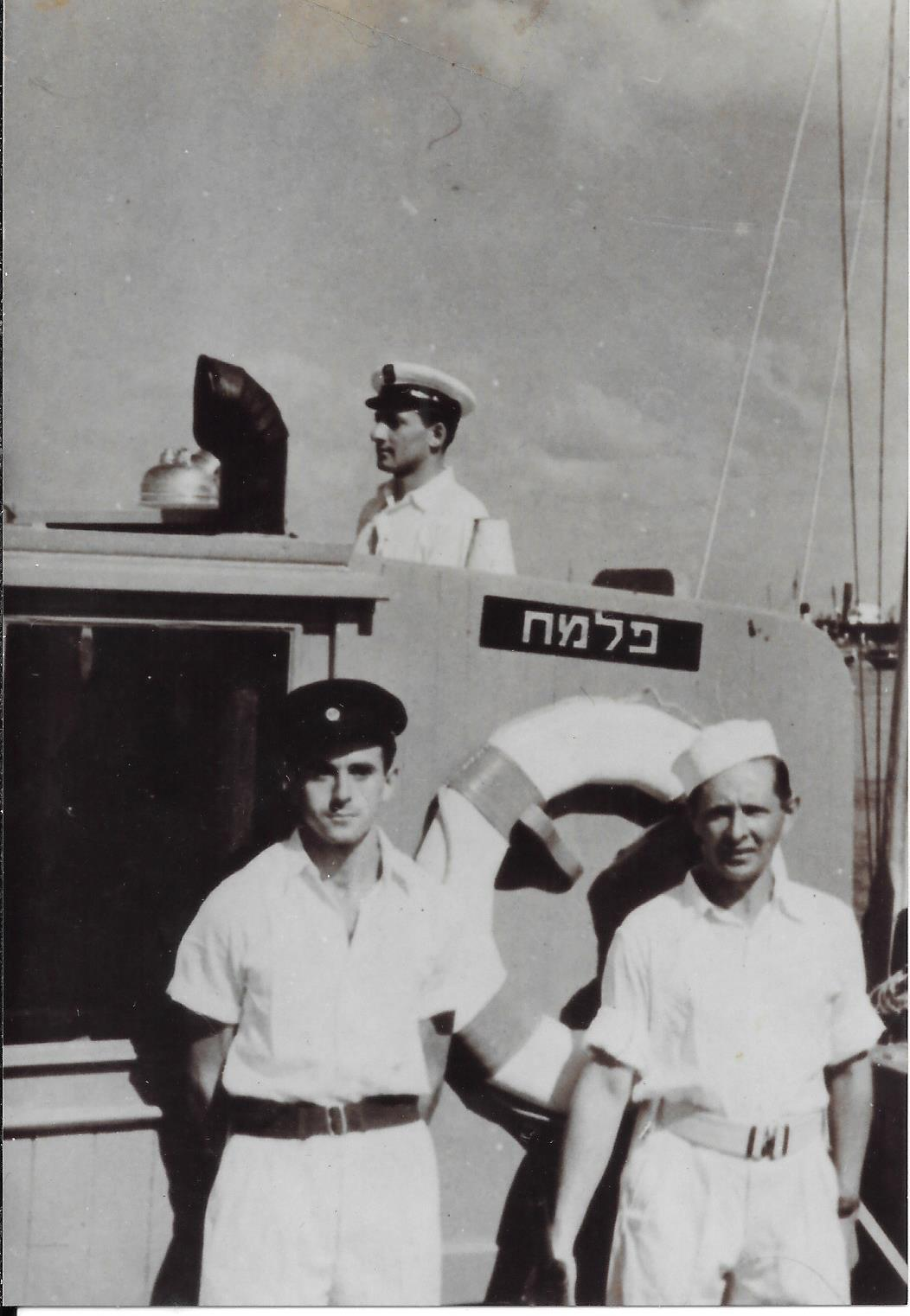
Erell (back) at the INS Palmach's bridge

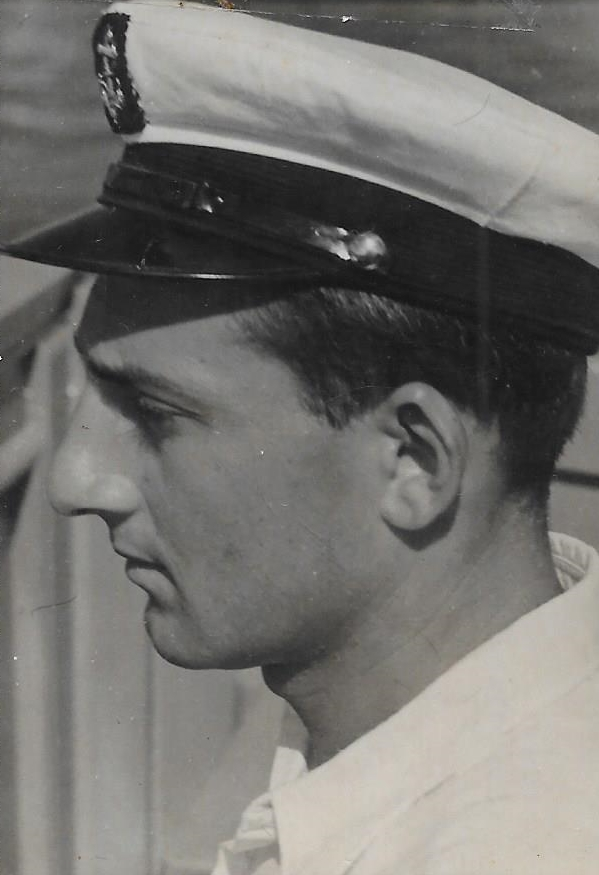
Erell in the Navy in 1949

=== Rise in the ranks of the Navy ===
In 1951, Erell took command of the frigate Misgav, and also oversaw Operation Columbus, a fundraising event involving the visit of Israeli naval vessels to the US. In 1952, he became the commander of the Navy Headquarters' training branch. Later that year, he was appointed head of the Navy's Fleet 1, which made several visits to Mediterranean countries during his tenure.

On 12 August 1953, while his fleet was returning to Israel after training for four weeks in the Aegean Sea, a 7.3 magnitude earthquake occurred on the Ionian Islands, killing at least 500 people. Erell's fleet—consisting of a corvette and three frigates—was 15 hours away from the scene, and diverted to provide assistance, being among the first responders. During the three-day rescue operation, which was Israel's first humanitarian mission, Erell's 450 men provided treatment to over 1,000 island residents, while his ships transported more than 300 injured residents to mainland Greece. In response to his rescue efforts, King Paul of Greece visited Erell's soldiers and awarded Erell a medal of merit. Israeli prime minister David Ben-Gurion also visited the fleet, with Erell recounting in an interview with Reuters that Ben-Gurion told him "we had proved that Israel was part of the area by the fact that we helped a nation with which we didn't have formal relations".

He was the IDF attaché in Italy and the Navy attaché in western Europe in 1955. In 1956, he attended the British Army's Staff College, Camberley, in the UK, and returned the following year, establishing the similar Naval Training Course for navy officers. The course was integrated with the IDF's Inter-Services Command and Staff College after its first class. Erell took control of the destroyer fleet in 1959, and became head of the naval department the following year, overseeing the development of its forces and its combat doctrine.

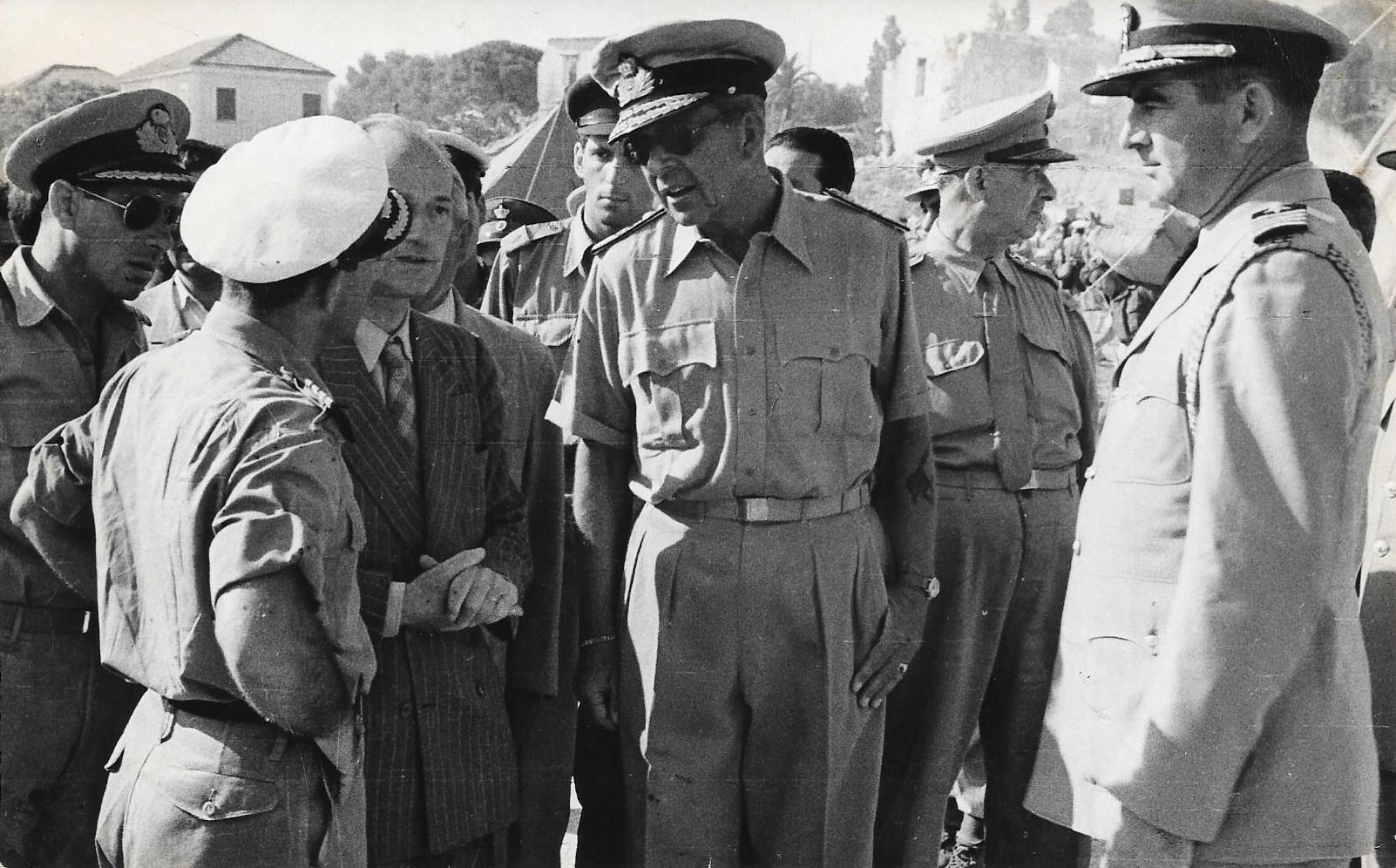
Paul of Greece meeting with Erell, August 1953

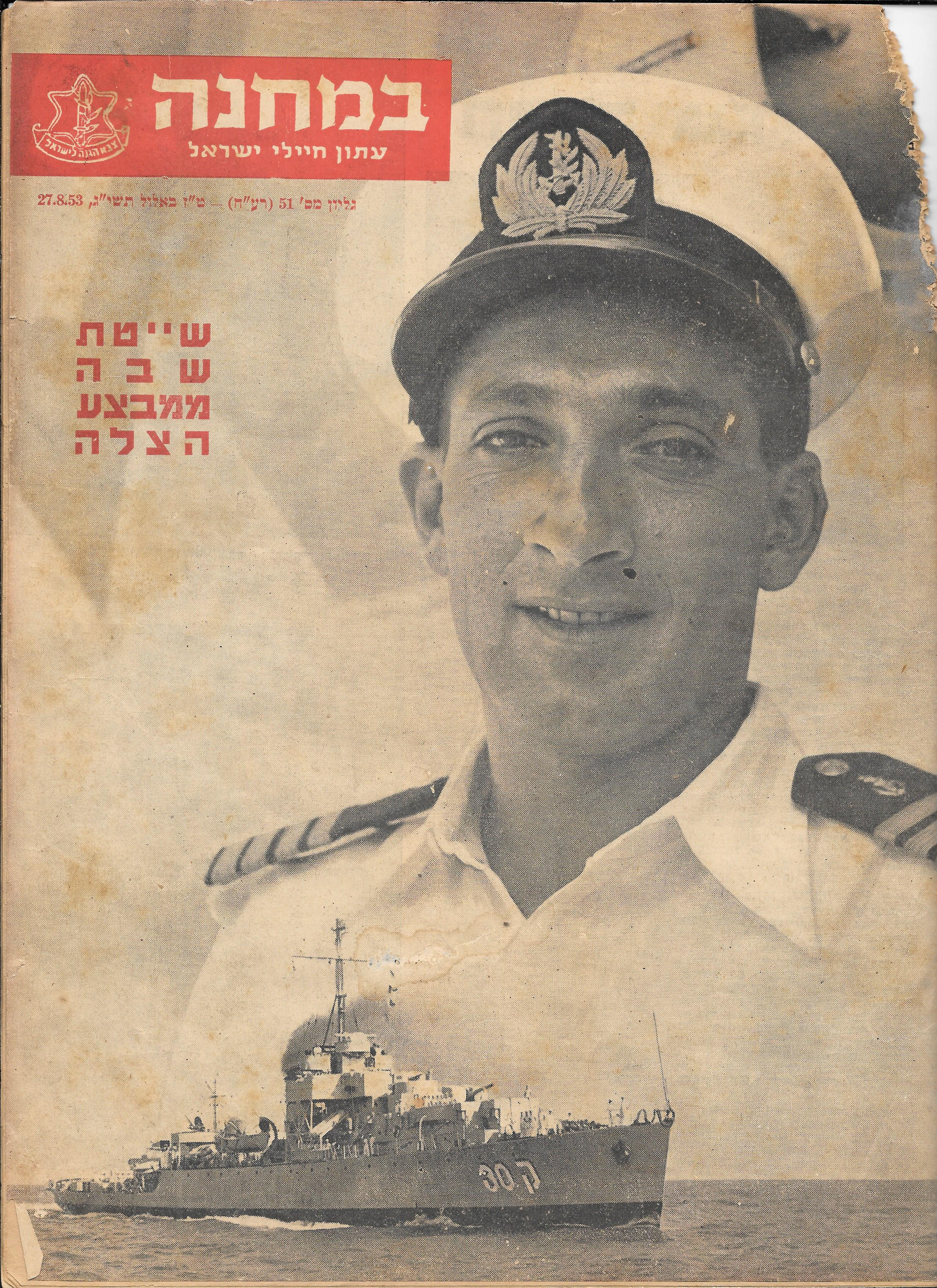
Hebrew newspaper covering Erell's return from the Ionian Islands

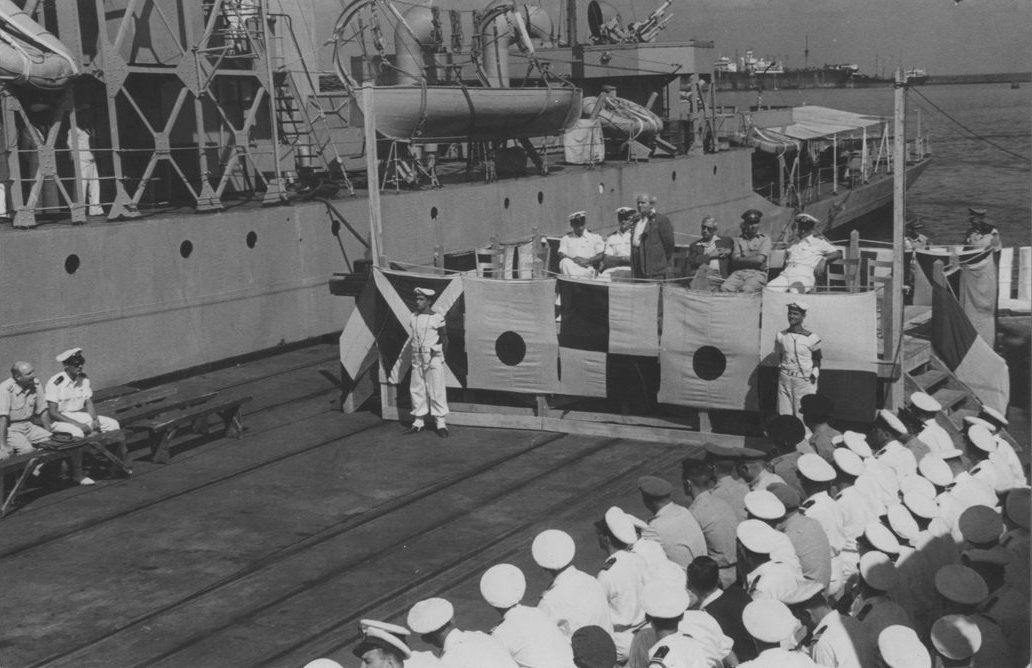
Ben-Gurion greeting Erell's fleet upon its return from the rescue operation in the Ionian Islands, September 1953

=== Involvement in the development of missile boats ===
In 1960, it was suggested that the Luz sea-to-sea missile, manufactured by Rafael Advanced Defense Systems, could be attached to patrol boats, giving them the power of a cruiser. The idea was largely dismissed, with no missile boats in the West at the time; however, Israeli Navy commander Yohai Ben-Nun, whom Erell served as deputy to, ordered Erell to look into the idea. The project was funded by then–deputy defense minister Shimon Peres. Erell established a think tank of navy and Israel Aerospace Industries personnel to assist the project, which was codenamed Shalechet. The Luz missile, later renamed the Gabriel, was central to the project.

Erell attended a defense ministry meeting in Bonn, Germany, in March 1963, while the German government was to send six Jaguar torpedo boats to Israel. Erell demanded that modifications be made to the ships, but was mocked, and instead decided to meet with the Jaguar's builders at Lürssen's Bremen firm, accompanied by naval engineer Haim Shahal. Shahal told the shipbuilders that the Jaguar was not large enough to hold the weapons planned for it. Lürssen's chief naval architect, Herr Waldemuth, agreed to make the suggested changes. Lürssen, in collaboration with a firm in Cherbourg, began constructing the modified Jaguars in 1965, which were dubbed the Sa'ar class. They were converted to missile boats after they arrived in Israel. Also that year, the Gabriel missile saw its first successful test.

== Commander of the Israeli Navy ==
Erell was promoted to the rank of Aluf (Major General) and appointed Commander of the Israeli Navy during a ceremony aboard the navy flagship INS Yaffo on 4 January 1966, replacing Yohai Ben-Nun.

When the Six-Day War broke out in June 1967, after Egypt and Syria launched a simultaneous attack on Israel, Erell had been in Europe, and returned to Israel to participate in the conflict. Shortly after the war started, he and naval intelligence chief Reuven Ashkenazi met with head of the Military Intelligence Directorate Aharon Yariv, where it was agreed to strengthen cooperation between the navy and Unit 848 (present-day Unit 8200) and increase resources for naval intelligence, with the new navy intelligence branch operating 24 hours a day. Erell convinced the General Staff to increase the number of missile boats in the navy's arsenal to 12 to allow it to manage both fronts. He acted aggressively against Egypt and Syria, deploying the elite Shayetet 13 naval unit to attack their ports.

After the Eilat destroyer was sunk by Styx missiles off Port Said, Egypt, killing 47 of its crew members and injuring 91, Erell convened with his electronics officer, Herut Tsemach, to develop a counter, for which he suggested the use of electronic-based countermeasures. After being implemented to Israeli naval vessels, the ships were able to successfully evade the Styxes, enabling Israel's victory at sea. Using Saar-class corvettes, the Navy conducted near-nightly attacks on Syrian ports. Erell, credited with this achievement, participated in one of the last naval sorties of the war. At one moment, four Styxes were seen heading towards Erell's ship at the Port of Tartus, but ended up striking decoys instead.

After the USS Liberty was attacked by Israeli forces, resulting in the deaths of 34 American sailors, Erell contacted the US naval attaché to convey his condolences, describing the attack as a "great mistake" that his personnel expressed guilt over. Erell blamed his deputy, Izzy Rahav, claiming that Rahav's impulsiveness led him to order an attack on the spy ship after it was mistaken for an Egyptian vessel. Erell and Izzy Rahav had traded accusations over each other's perceived poor performance during the war. Rahav accused Erell of "project[ing] hesitation and doubt". However, Erell insisted that the attack was accidental, telling the BBC that it was the result of mistaken identity, and that those pushing that the attack was deliberate were seeking to discredit Israel. On 5 June 1977, he told the Associated Press that "No one would ever have dreamt that an American ship would be there. Even the United States didn't know where its ship was. We were advised by the proper authorities that there was no American ship within 100 miles."

Erell presided over the opening of the War of Attrition in 1967. Under his command, the INS Dakar submarine vanished along with its 69 crew members in the eastern Mediterranean on 25 January 1968 while en route to the UK. In the weeks following the incident, Erell addressed his personnel in a letter, expressing grief over the loss while praising his men for being able to move on. An unsuccessful search lasting a month followed, which recovered no signs of the missing submarine. Erell criticized the effort, stating that it unnecessarily raised the hopes of the victims' families that their bodies would be recovered, while questioning whether the submarine was even lost in the area being searched. The wreckage of the submarine was only recovered in 1999. Documents released in 2013 revealed that during a cabinet meeting on 27 January, Erell said that he did not suspect that the submarine was sunk by Egypt but was also unsure of the cause. Weeks later, he prepared a paper proposing that the submarine may have sunk due to human error or a malfunction, a collision with another vessel, or military action by the Soviets. In August, Erell said that the Navy's primary goal since the Six-Day War was to patrol the southern Mediterranean up to Port Said to prevent any naval infiltration into Israel.

Erell retired from the IDF in September 1968, and was replaced by Avraham Botzer.

Erell arriving on INS Yaffo for the Navy's change of command ceremony, 1966

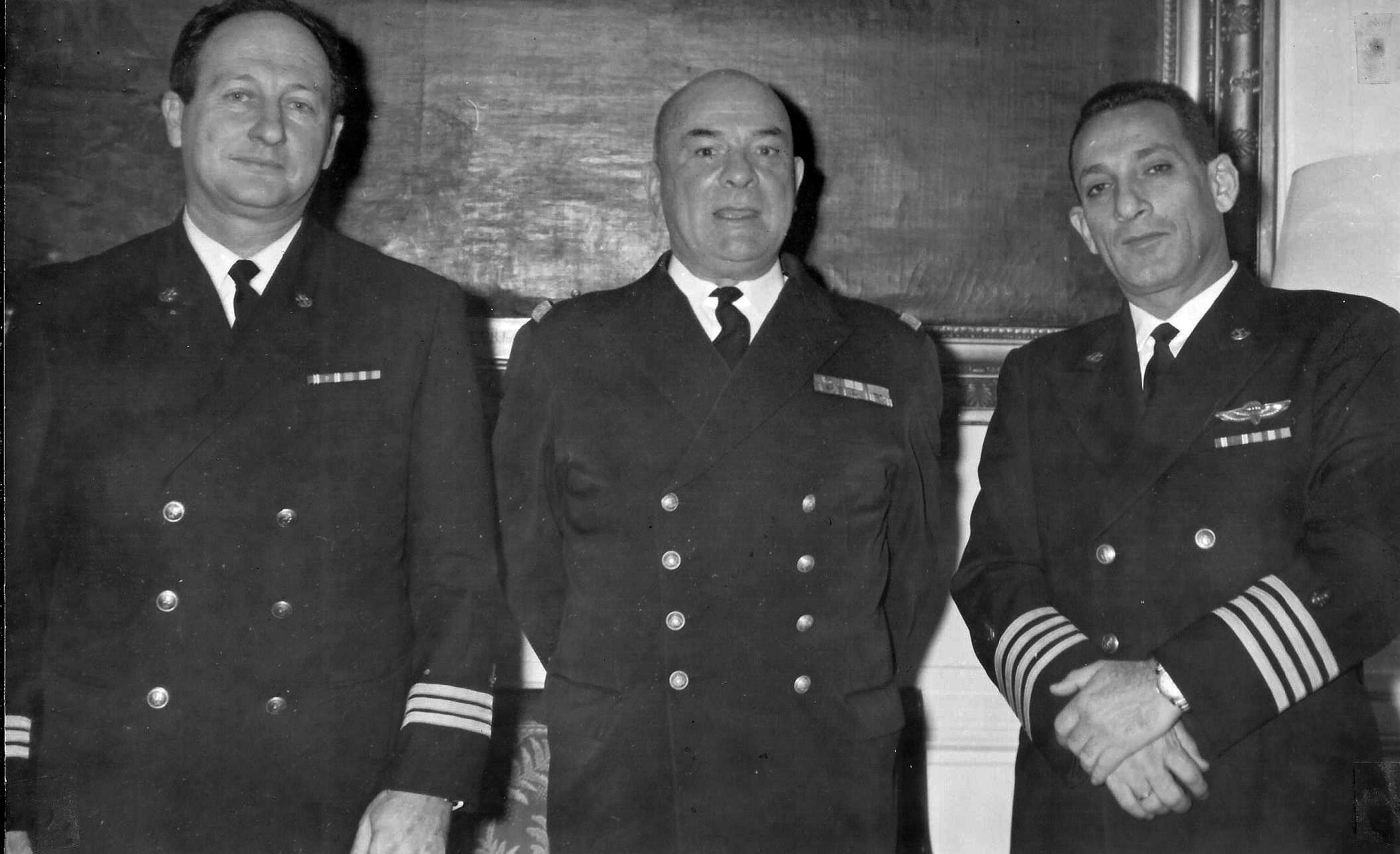
Lt. Col. Haim Shahal (left), French Admiral Vitrand (commander of the naval area in Cherbourg; center), and Erell (right), 1966

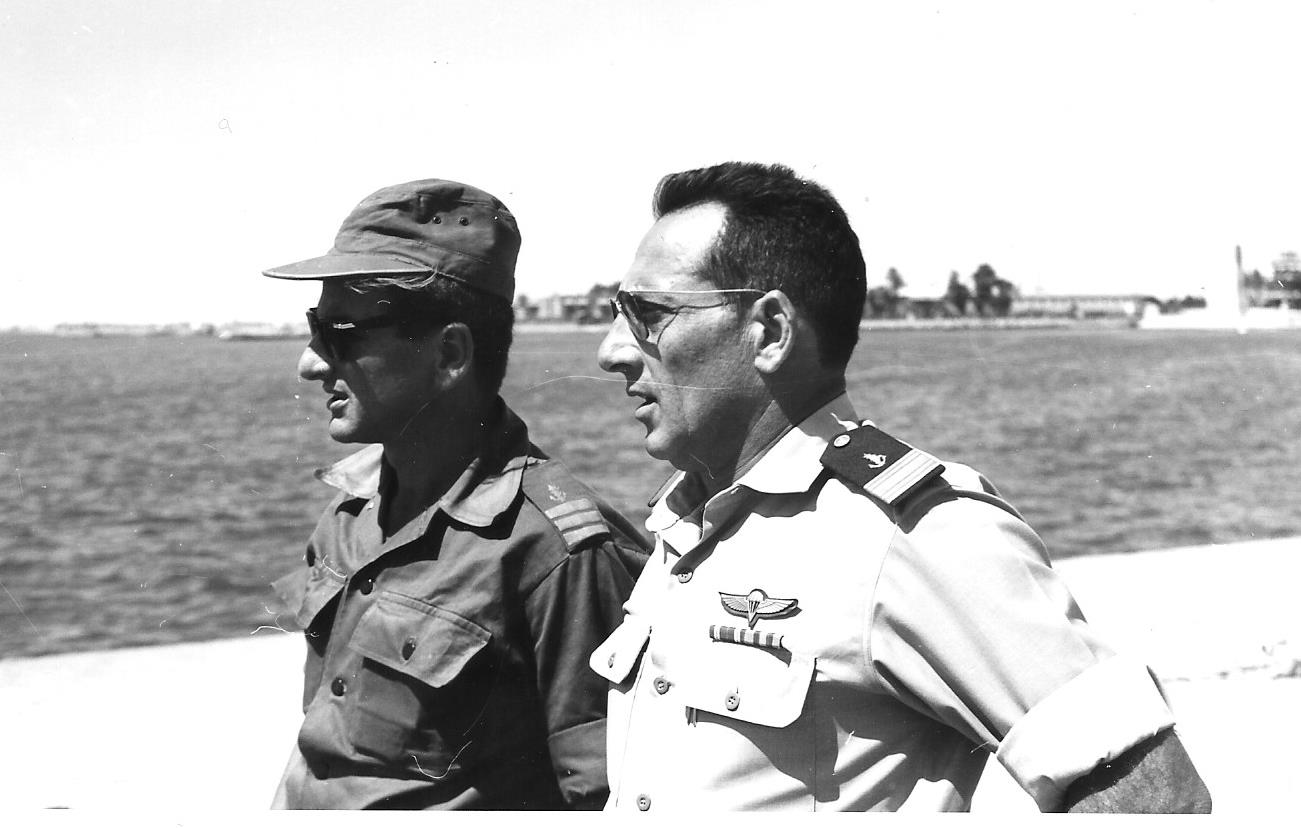
Erell and Fleet 13 commander Lt. Col. Dov Shapir at an observation post over the Suez Canal, 1967

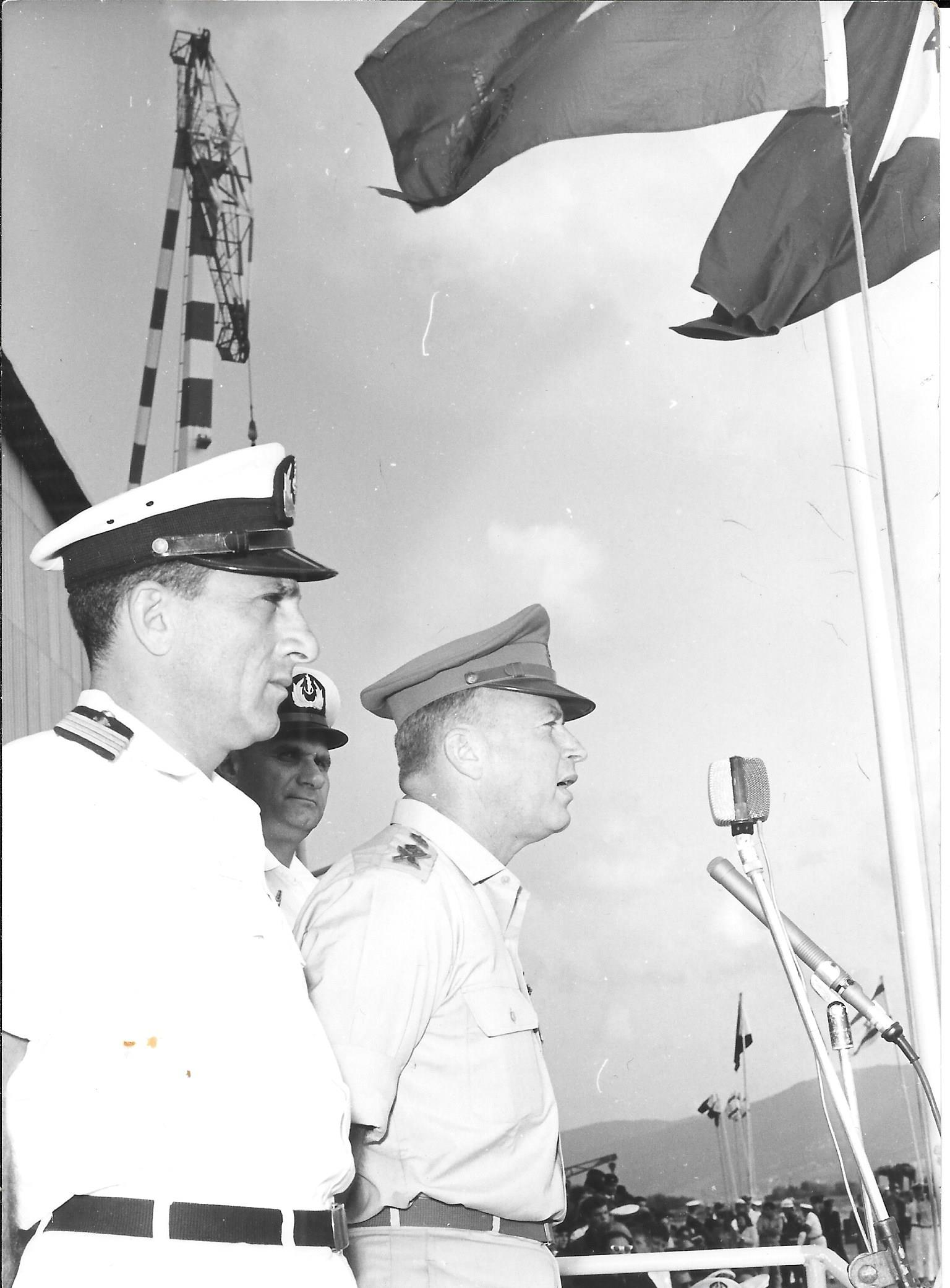
Erell and then–chief of staff Yitzhak Rabin at a ceremony at the Navy Headquarters, 1967

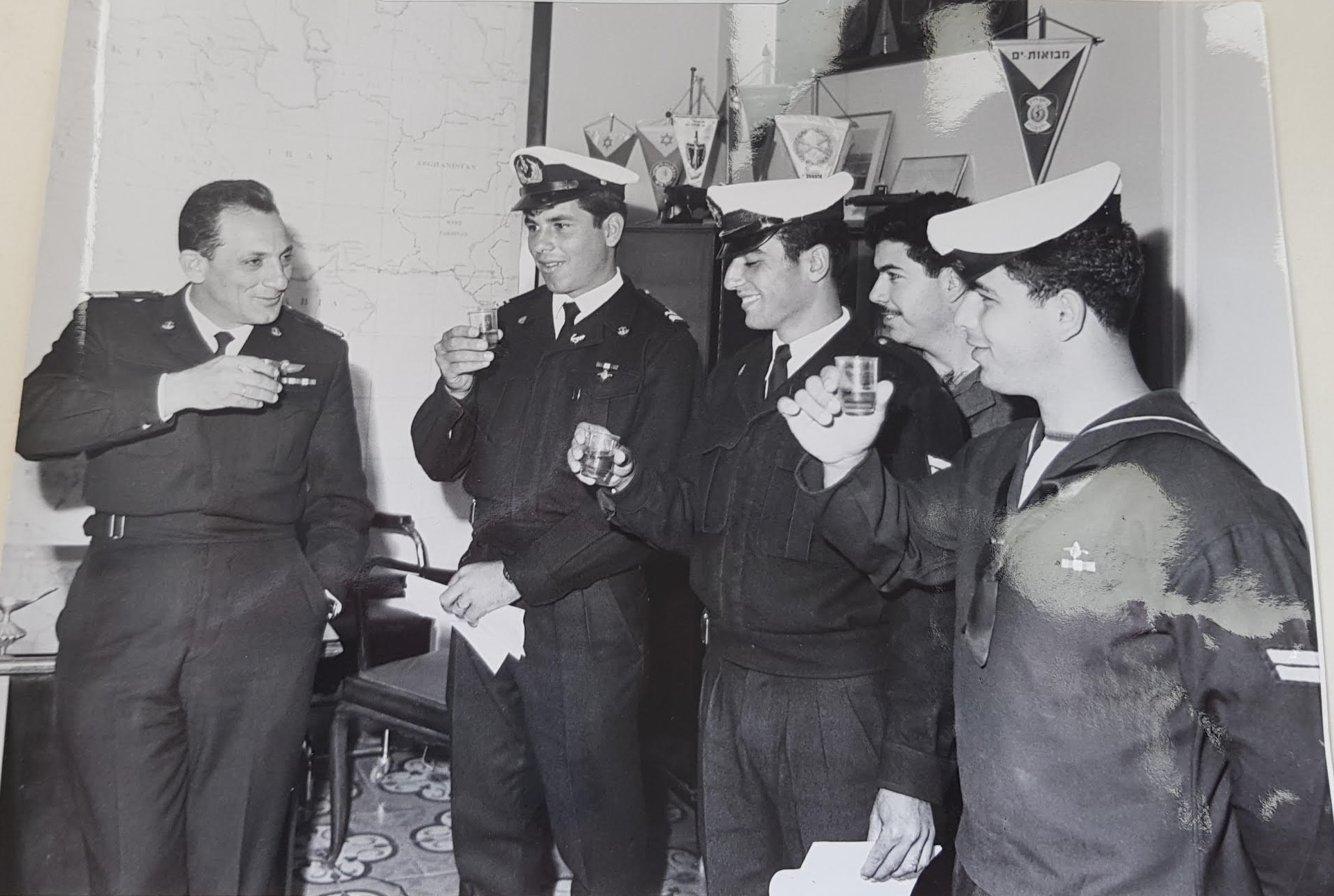
Erell awards commendation to the survivors of the sinking of the destroyer Eilat, 1968

== Post-military life ==
After retiring, Erell worked in several maritime industries. He also received a master's degree in administration from Columbia University. In the 1970s, he became a member of the Likud party and from time to time he was brought in by Israeli leaders as an advisor of naval issues. Between 1984 and 1988, he served as the Comptroller of the Defense System.

== Personal life and death ==
Erell's wife, Sarah, died in 2013. His daughter, Ghilia, also died in 2000, and his son, Udi, is a reserve general in the Navy. Erell also had five grandchildren and 11 great-grandchildren. He died in Tel Aviv on 20 November 2018, on his 98th birthday. He was buried at Kiryat Shaul Cemetery.

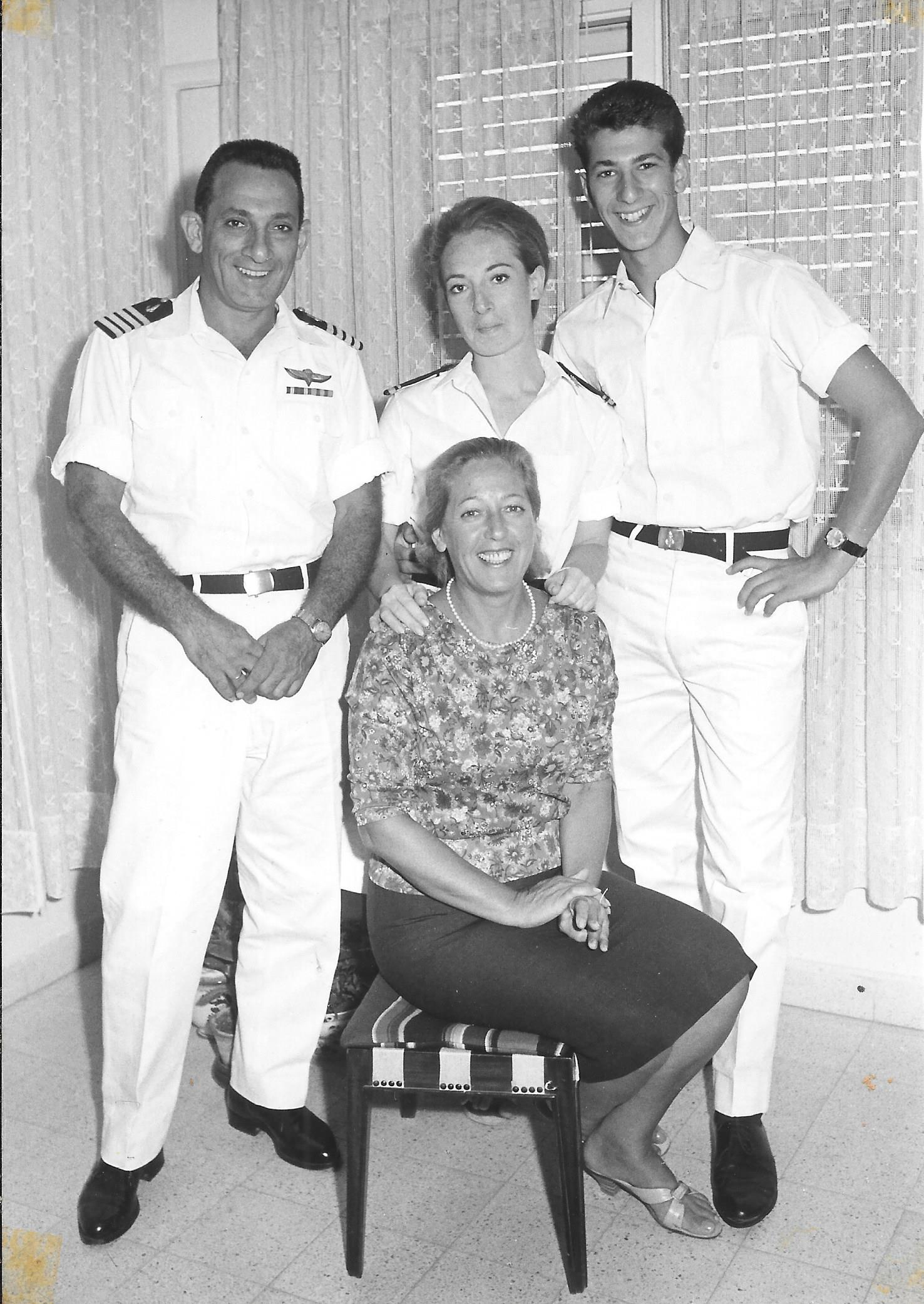
Erell and his family, 1966

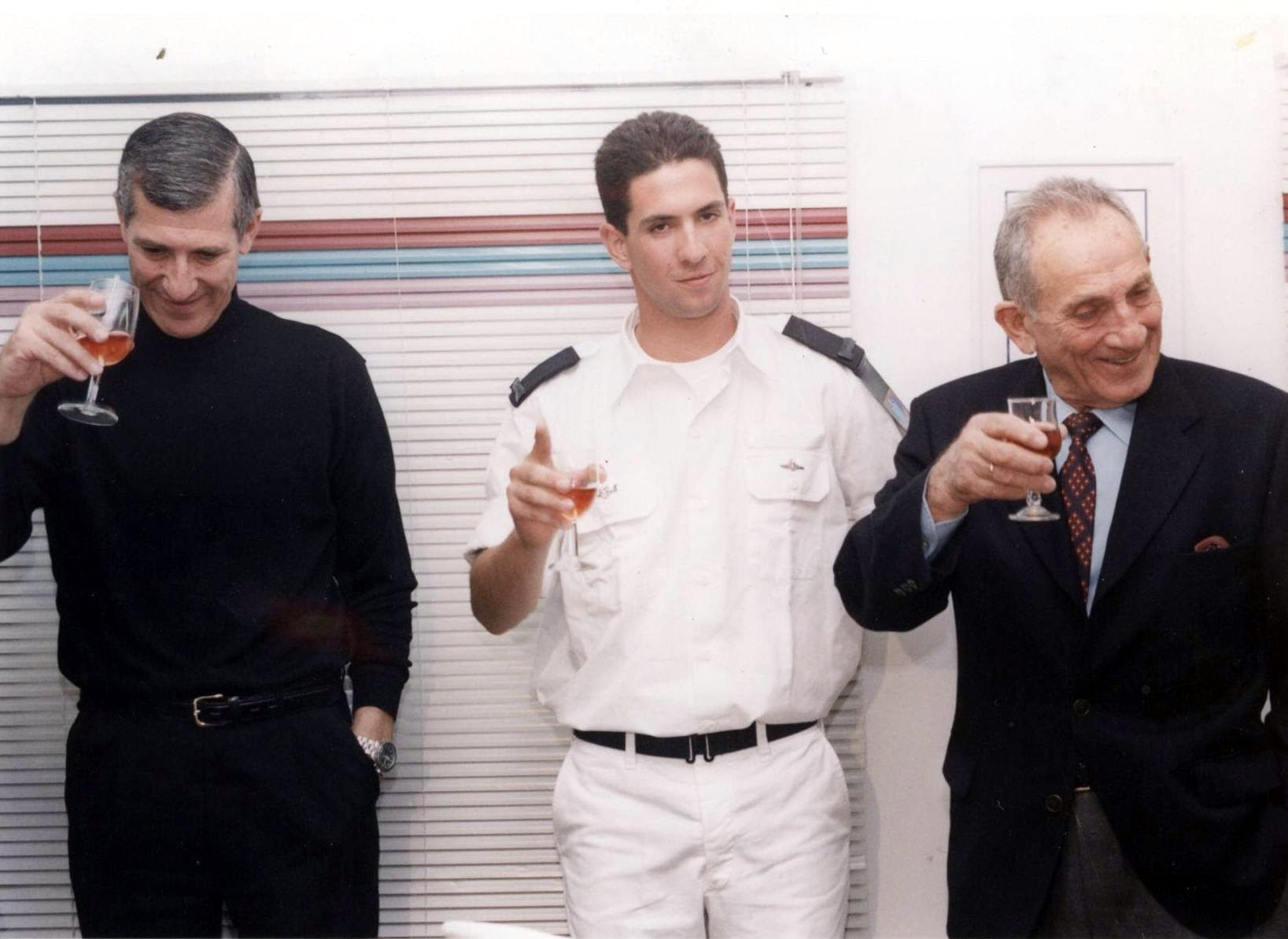
Shlomo Erell, his son Ehud, and his grandson Yair celebrating Yair's graduation from the Israeli Navy sailor's course

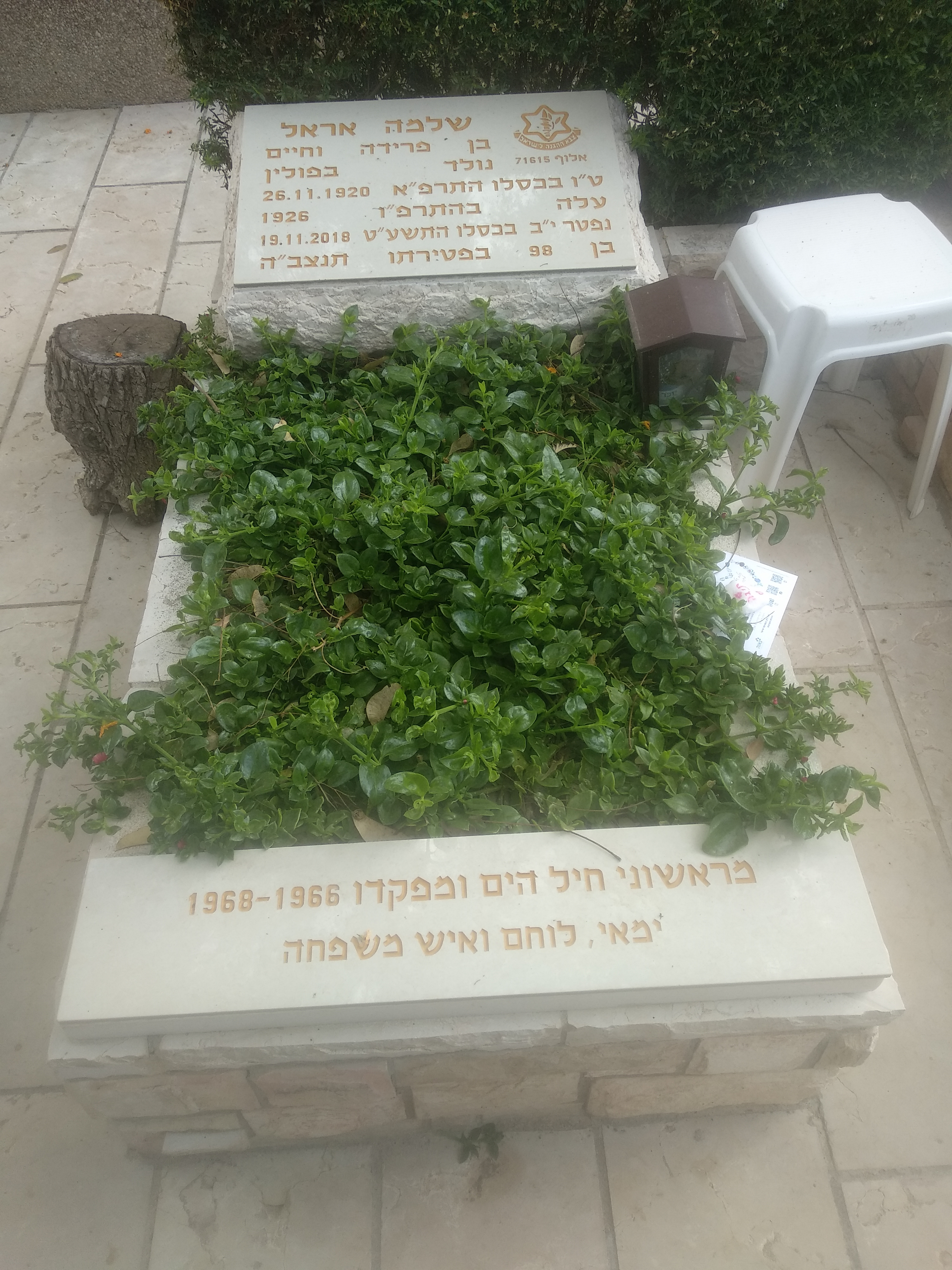
Erell's grave at the Kiryat Shaul Military Cemetery

== Published works ==
- Erell, Shlomo (2000). Diplomacy in the Depths of the Sea. Ma'ariv Publishing.
