= Eyal Harel =

Israeli military personnel

- אייל הראל
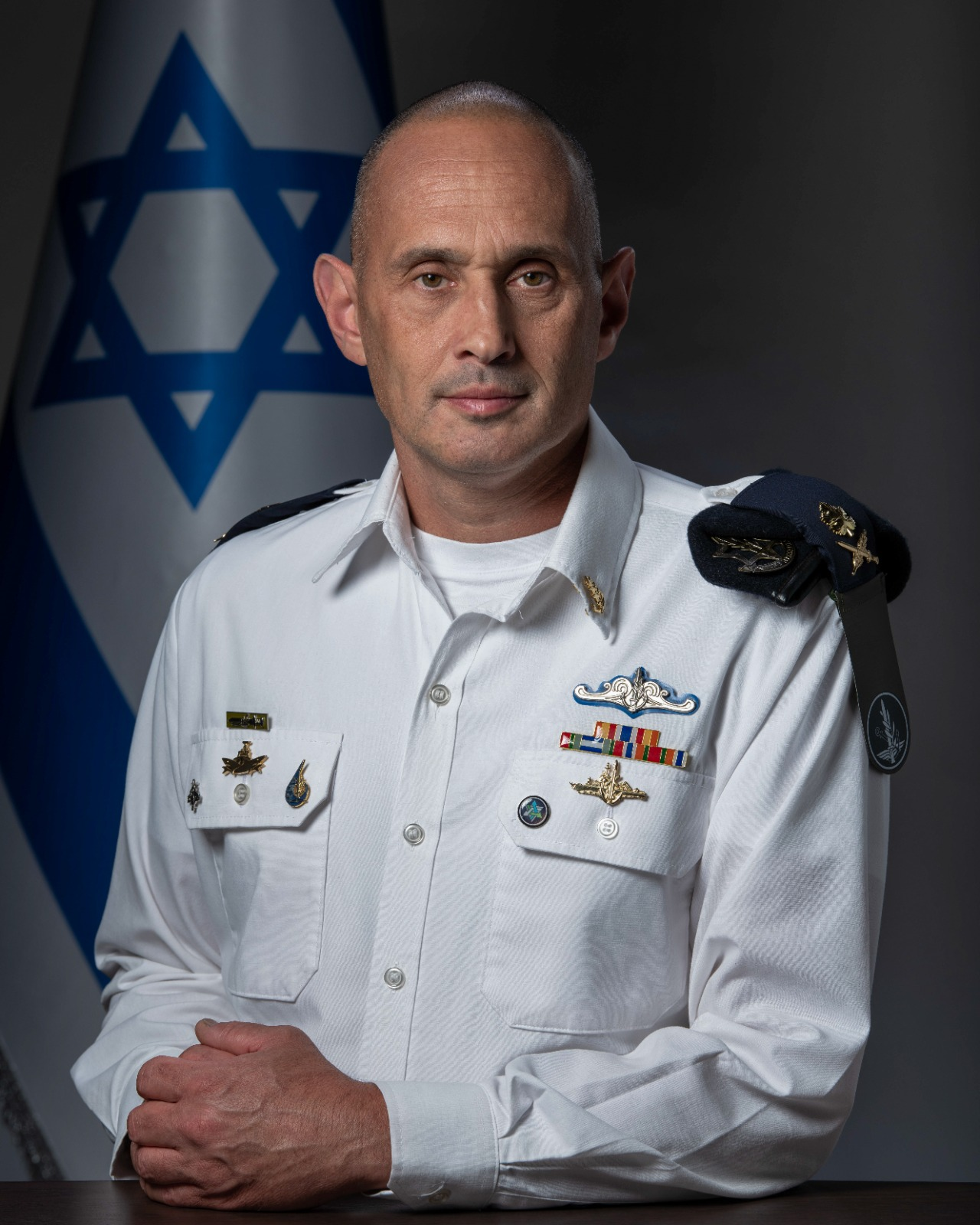
- Born: 27 April 1974 (age 52); Ramat Gan, Israel
- Military career
- Allegiance: Israel
- Branch: Israel Defense Forces
- Service years: 1992–present
- Rank: Aluf (Vice Admiral)
- Conflicts: First Intifada; Second Intifada; 2006 Lebanon War; Operation Cast Lead; Operation Pillar of Defense; Operation Protective Edge; Operation Guardian of the Walls

Eyal Harel (Hebrew: אייל הראל; born April 27, 1974) is an Israel Defense Forces officer with the rank of Vice Admiral, serving as Commander of the Israeli Navy since 2026 and Head of the Planning and Force Build-up Directorate. Previously he served as Head of the Planning Division, Commander of the Naval Headquarters, and Head of the Naval Intelligence Division.

== Early life and education ==
Eyal Harel was born in Ramat Gan. The family moved to the Golan Heights.

Harel is a graduate of the Inter-Service Command and Staff College, the Brigade Commander's course. He holds a BA in economics and business administration from the University of Haifa. He also has an MA with honors in political science and national security from the National Security College and the University of Haifa. Additionally, he holds a cum laude MBA in big data and business intelligence from Data & Decision Science Faculty at the Technion.

Harel is married to Yael, née Klineberger, who works at the University of Haifa, and is the father of three daughters. He resides in Kibbutz Gesher HaZiv.

== Military service ==
Harel enlisted in the IDF in August 1992 and is a graduate of the Naval Officers Course, class P, majoring in Navigation Systems. He served as Deputy Machine Officer on INS Geula. In 1995 he took the PIM course and was assigned as Machine Officer on INS Nitzachon (Sa'ar 4) and also served as the ship's deputy commander.

=== Missile Ships Flotilla ===
Harel was retrained in the command field, assigned to Flotilla 914 and served as deputy commander of Dvora patrol boat. In 1999 he graduated with distinction from the PIM course for Dvora commanders and took command of Dvora 811. He served as Dvora commander in Flotilla 914 and was engaged in routine security in the Southern Lebanon sector.

=== Missile Boats Flotilla ===
In 2000, Harel took the PIM course for EO officers. He returned to the Missile Boats Flotilla as EO officer on INS Yaffo, where he also served as deputy commander. In 2002, he qualified as a missile boat commander and took command of INS Romach.

In 2004 he studied full-time economics at the University of Haifa. During the 2006 Lebanon War he served in an emergency appointment as an additional missile boat commander. In 2007, after completing his studies, he was appointed Operations Officer of the Missile Boats Flotilla, during the period when the flotilla was engaged in rehabilitation and restoring operational capability after the INS Hanit incident in the Second Lebanon War.

=== Patrol Boats Flotilla ===
In August 2008, Harel was promoted to Lieutenant Colonel and appointed Commander of Flotilla 916, the Patrol Boats Flotilla in Ashdod. The flotilla took a major part in military operations in and around Gaza, including during the 2008 Gaza war. During this period, the flotilla participated in the 2010 Gaza flotilla raid to intercept protest flotillas from abroad that tried to breach the Israeli blockade of the Gaza Strip, resulting in the killing of several unarmed activists. He commanded several naval interception operations to prevent arms smuggling to the Gaza Strip and intercept militants. During his command, there was an attempted suicide bombing attack by a fishing boat on a 916 Flotilla vessel.

=== Return to Missile Boats ===
In July 2010, Harel was appointed Commander of Squadron 31 in the Missile Boats Flotilla, commanded the squadron during Operation Pillar of Defense, attacking targets from the sea, and during the 2014 Gaza War, including capturing the ship Victoria, which tried to smuggle weapons to Hamas. In 2011, he served as Deputy Commander of the Missile Boats Flotilla in addition to his role as Commander of Squadron 31.

In 2013, Harel was appointed Commander of the Missile Boats Flotilla and promoted to Colonel. During his tenure, the flotilla won first place in the IDF elite units fitness competition and second place in the Chief of Staff prize competition. Under his command, the flotilla fought in the 2014 Gaza War, attacking targets along the Gaza Strip coast, enforcing the maritime closure, and protecting the gas rigs. He also commanded the naval force to capture the Iranian weapons ship KLOS C in the Red Sea.

=== At the General Staff ===
In 2015, Harel was appointed Head of the Planning Department in the Planning Directorate. In this role, he was responsible, among other things, for planning and implementing the IDF Gideon Doctrine.

=== At the Navy Headquarters ===
In July 2018, Harel was appointed Head of the Naval Intelligence Division. In this position he made changes to the organizational structure of the division to adapt it to the way the Intelligence Directorate functions and its work processes. For this purpose, a third department – the Operations Department – was established in the division, whose purpose is to maintain close working relations with the Operations Division in the Intelligence Directorate and the IDF Operations Branch.

In October 2019, Harel was appointed Head of the Naval Headquarters. He worked on adapting the change in the Navy's operational headquarters, establishing the Control Unit and the Economic Maritime Arena at the department level, writing an operational concept for the operational headquarters in operational activity, and leading the activity of the Navy during the between the wars campaign period.

=== At the General Staff ===
In May 2021, Harel was appointed head of the Planning Division in the Planning Directorate. As head of the Planning Division, he engaged in planning and implementing the Momentum IDF multi-year plan of the Chief of Staff, Lt. Gen. Aviv Kochavi. On May 3, 2023, the decision was announced to appoint him as head of the Planning and Force Build-up Directorate, with the rank of Major General, which was conferred on him in June of that year. On August 2, 2023, he assumed the position of Head of the Planning and Force Build-up Directorate.

In December 2025, defense minister Israel Katz approved Harel's appointment as the next Commander of the Israeli Navy. The decision was delayed for weeks due to a dispute with IDF chief Eyal Zamir.

=== Commander of the Navy ===
On 16 April 2026, Harel was appointed as Commander of the Navy during a ceremony held at the Atlit naval base, succeeding David Saar Salama. His appointment, originally scheduled for March, was delayed due to the 2026 Iran war.
