= Ram Rothberg =

Israeli admiral

- רם רוטברג
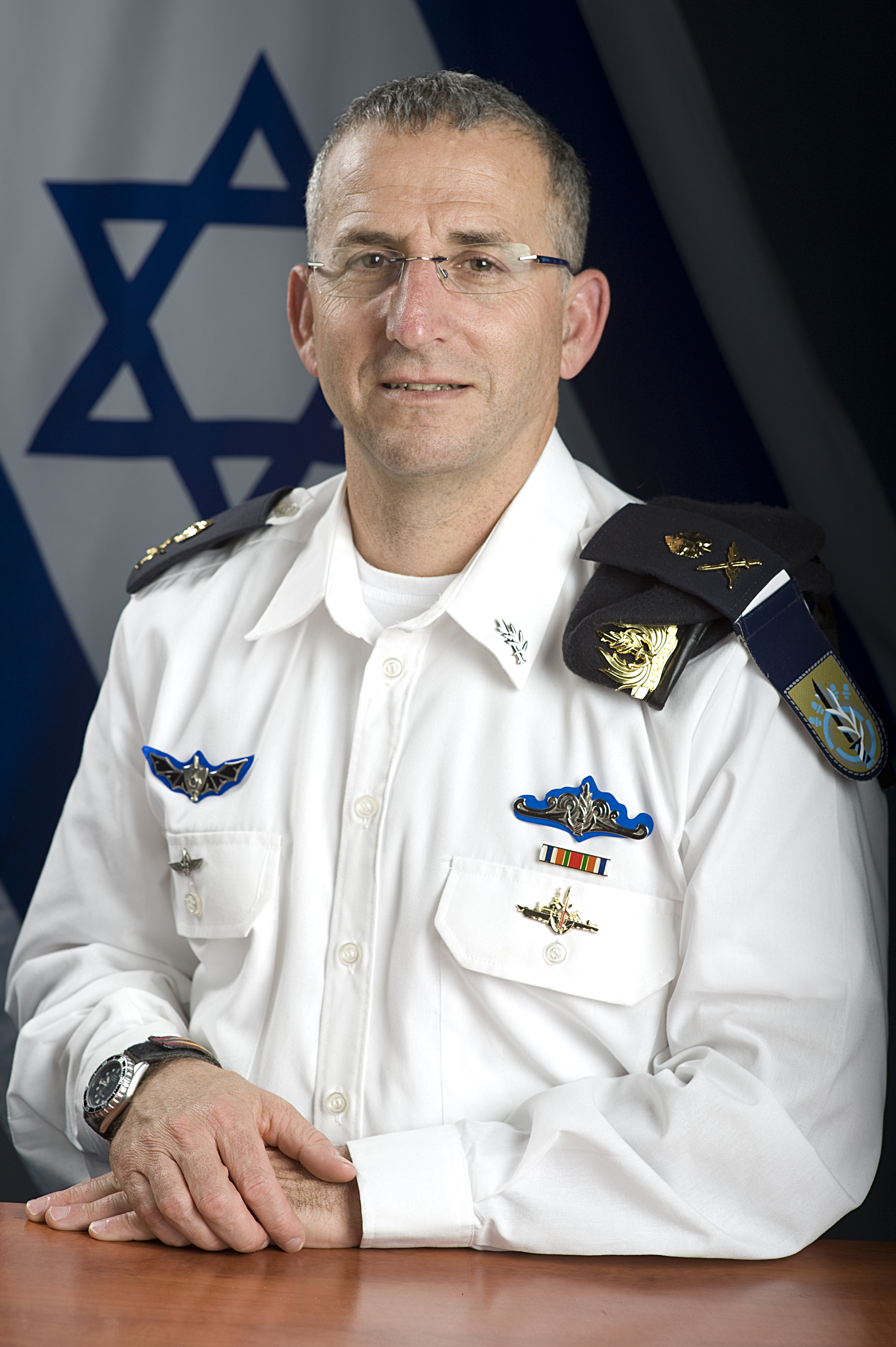

Commander of the Israeli Navy
- In office 10 October 2011 – 27 September 2016
- Prime Minister: Benjamin Netanyahu
- Chief: Gadi Eizenkot
- Preceded by: Eliezer Marom
- Succeeded by: Eli Sharvit

Personal details
- Born: February 5, 1964 (age 62) Kfar Hess, Israel

Military service
- Allegiance: Israel
- Branch/service: Israeli Navy
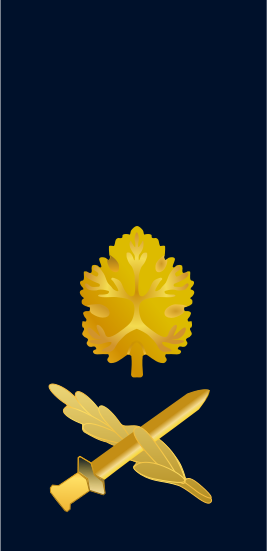
- Rank: Vice Admiral
- Unit: Flotilla 13; Commander Duvdevan undercover unit
- Commands: Commander of the Israeli Navy; Naval Intelligence; Haifa Naval Base; Commander of Flotilla 13
- Battles/wars: South Lebanon conflict (1985–2000); First Intifada; Second Intifada; 2006 Lebanon War; Karine A Affair; Francop Affair; Operation Pillar of Defense; Operation Full Disclosure; Operation Protective Edge

Aluf Ram Rothberg (Hebrew: רם רוטברג; born February 5, 1964) is a retired admiral in the Israel Defense Forces who was the head of the Israel Navy.

== Service history ==
Rothberg was drafted to the IDF in 1982. He volunteered for Shayetet 13 and joined the unit as a commando soldier following 2 year of training. He attended the infantry officers course at Bahad 1 and returned to his unit as a team leader. He served in other command positions in the unit and commanded the raiding unit in Operation Blue Brown

Rothberg commanded the Shayetet 13 special forces unit from 2001 to 2004 and presided over some of its most notable operations, such as the raid on the Karin A arms smuggling ship in January 2002.

He later served as the Chief of Naval Intelligence during the Second Lebanon War and was reprimanded by then-Chief of Staff Dan Halutz for the 14 July 2006 attack on the Israeli corvette INS Hanit. An Iranian-supplied C-802 anti-ship missile fired by Hezbollah hit the warship, whose crew was apparently unaware that the Lebanese group possessed such weapons. The strike left four sailors dead and the ship temporarily disabled. Rothberg was criticized over his contribution to the failure, but later was promoted to the position of commander of the Navy's Haifa base.

Afterwards, Rothberg served in the Israeli National Security Council.

=== Commander of the Israeli Navy ===
On 4 August 2011, Israeli Defense Minister Ehud Barak approved his appointment as the next head of the Israel Navy, after being nominated by IDF Chief of Staff Benny Gantz. He is to be promoted in rank to Major General (Aluf). He replaced Vice-Admiral Eliezer Marom, who retired after serving in the IDF for 37 years. He was not the front runner for the post and the appointment was received with surprise by military officials. On 10 October 2011, in a ceremony held at the Haifa naval base, Rothberg entered his role as commander of the Israel Navy.

In 2012, Rothberg was investigated for an April Fool's Day joke. Shortly before April Fool's Day, Rothberg ordered senior commanders to prepare for a complex, 10-day exercise in Italy with the US and Italian navies. Intending to keep the joke among senior officers, he ordered the news be kept at the senior command level, but the information leaked to lower officers, who worked throughout the night to prepare. Three missile ships and their crews were readied at Haifa naval base and officers worked to chart a course to Italy. Sailors' parents also rushed to the base to give them supplies and money. By the time Rothberg admitted that it was a joke, the three warships were ready to set sail, and crews were standing at attention on deck.

On 5 March 2014, Rothberg personally led Operation Full Disclosure from onboard the INS Hanit. The operation seized an Iranian ship smuggling weapons believed to have been destined to Gaza.

On 27 September 2016, Rothberg ended his role as a commander of the Israel Navy and retired.
