= Eli Sharvit =

Commander of the Israeli Navy and a general in the Israel Defense Forces

- אלי שרביט
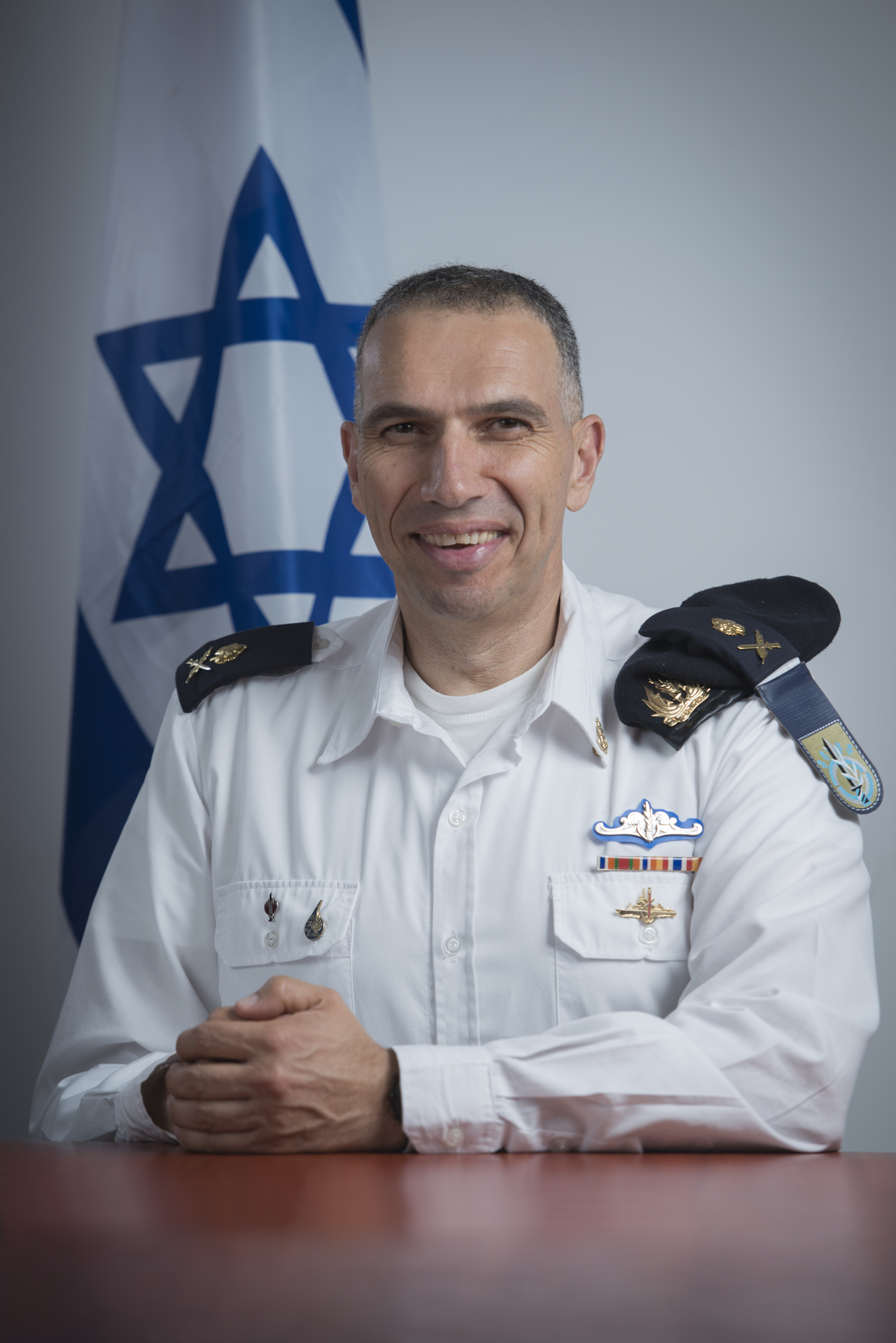

Commander of the Israeli Navy
- In office 12 September 2016 – 2 September 2021
- Prime Minister: Benjamin Netanyahu; Yair Lapid
- Chief: Aviv Kochavi
- Preceded by: Ram Rothberg
- Succeeded by: David Saar Salama

Military service
- Allegiance: Israel
- Branch/service: Israeli Navy
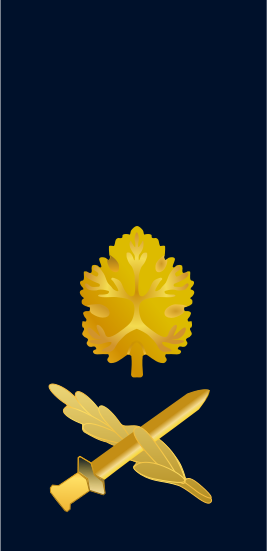
- Rank: Vice Admiral
- Commands: Haifa Naval Base

Vice Admiral Eli Sharvit (Hebrew: אלי שרביט) is a general in the Israel Defense Forces who served as the Commander of the Israeli Navy between 2016 and 2021.

== Life and career ==
Sharvit was born on kibbutz Sde Boker and grew up in Beersheba. He was one of three children born to Yosef and Esther Sharvit, Moroccan Jewish immigrants to Israel. He attended the Makif Alef school in Beersheba. He is married to Eti and the father of three children. Sharvit was conscripted into the Israel Defense Forces in 1985 and joined the Israeli Navy. He remained in the navy as an officer after his mandatory service. Sharvit served in numerous positions and later headed the navy's missile boat fleet in 2009. Sharvit then served as the commander of the Haifa naval base, taking over command from then-base commander Ram Rothberg, from 2011 to 2014. From 2014 onwards until his appointment as Commander, he served as the Chief of staff for the Israeli Navy.

=== Commander of the Israeli Navy ===
On September 12, 2016, Israeli Defense Minister Avigdor Lieberman approved his appointment as the next head of the Israeli Navy, after being nominated by IDF Chief of Staff Gadi Eisenkot. He is to be promoted in rank to Major General (Aluf). He replaced Vice-Admiral Ram Rothberg, who served as the Commander of the Israeli Navy for five years. He officially entered his role as the Commander of the Israeli Navy at a ceremony in Tel Aviv. He was replaced by his deputy David Saar Salama on 2 September 2021.

=== After military service ===
On March 31, 2025, Israeli Prime Minister Benjamin Netanyahu announced that Eli would take over the position of director of the Israeli Security Agency after the dismissal of Ronen Bar. This was rescinded the following day, although no reason has been officially given as of yet.
