= Northrop Grumman Ship Systems =

American small shipping products division

- Type: Public (NYSE: NOC)
- Industry: Maritime Defense
- Headquarters: Pascagoula, Mississippi
- Products: Aircraft carriers Military vessels Information Technology; Advanced electronic sensors and systems
- Website: NorthropGrumman.com

Northrop Grumman Ship Systems (NGSS) was formerly a sector or division of Northrop Grumman Corporation which was responsible for building small and medium shipping products. It was merged with another sector of Northrop Grumman, Northrop Grumman Newport News, which was responsible for building nuclear submarines and supercarriers, to form the sector Northrop Grumman Shipbuilding.

NGSS was headquartered in Pascagoula, Mississippi. It was formed by the union of Ingalls Shipbuilding and Avondale Shipyard companies, reorganized as NGSS Ingalls Operations and NGSS Avondale Operations. NGSS facilities are located in Pascagoula, Gulfport, Mississippi, Bridge City, Louisiana, and Tallulah, Louisiana.

On March 31, 2011, Northrop Grumman spun off its shipbuilding sector (including Ingalls Shipbuilding) into a new corporation, Huntington Ingalls Industries.

== Ships ==
- NGSS was awarded the contract to construct the San Antonio-class amphibious transport dock (LPD) fleet; including USS New York, USS Arlington, and USS Somerset.
- NGSS repaired the destroyer USS Cole after it was damaged in an attack in Yemen.
- NGSS built three Sa'ar 5-class missile boats for Israel, based on Israeli designs. These ships include INS Eilat (1993), INS Lahav (1993) and INS Hanit (1994).
