= David Saar Salama =

Israeli Vice Admiral and commander of the Israeli Navy

- דוד סער סלמה
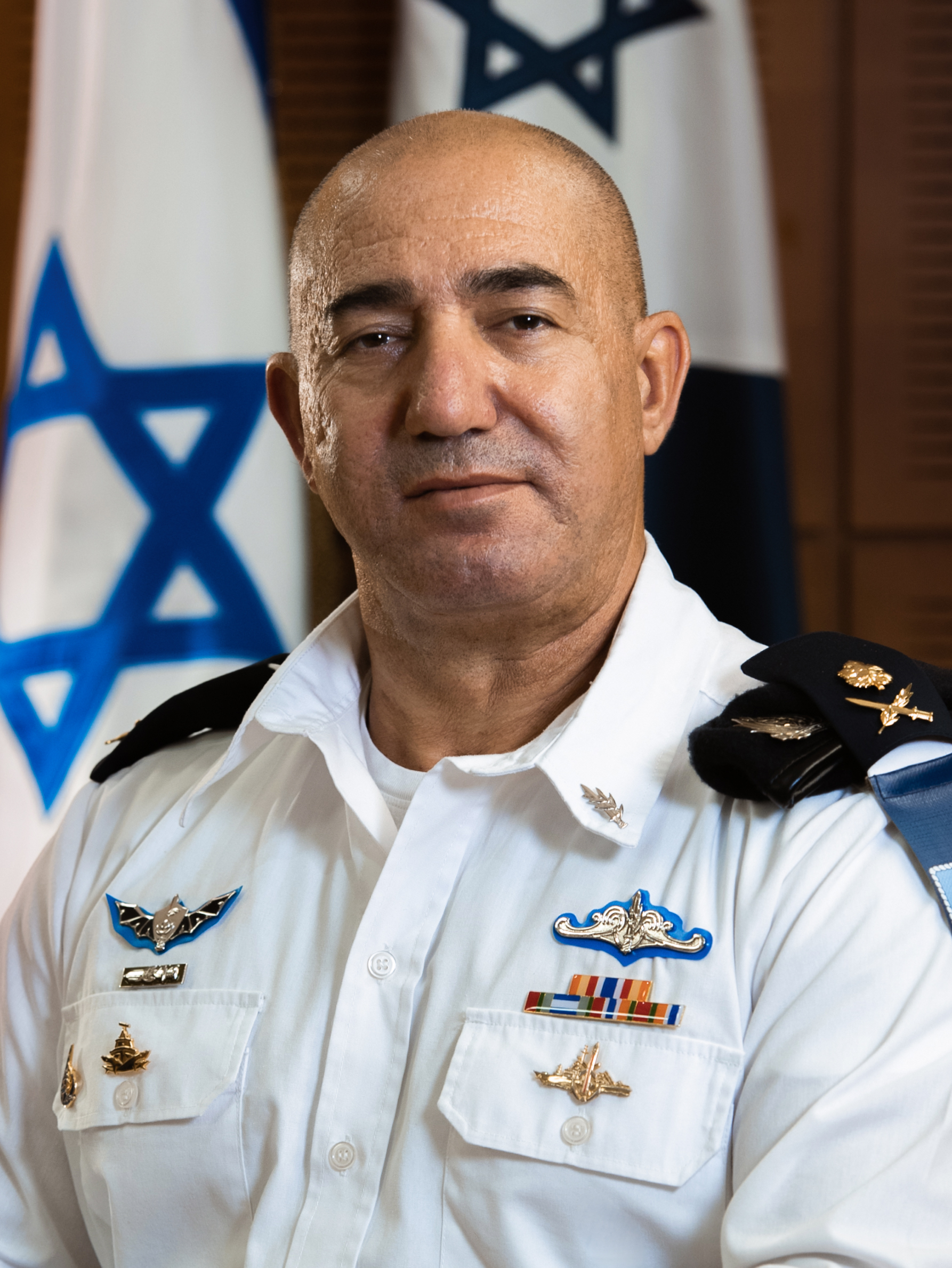
- Born: March 4, 1969 (age 57); Atlit, Israel
- Military career
- Allegiance: Israel
- Branch: Israeli Navy
- Service years: 1987−present
- Rank: Aluf (Vice Admiral)
- Commands: Head Instructor in Shayetet 13; Captain of INS Yaffo; 916st fleet; Commander of Eilat Naval Base; Commander of Ashdod Naval Base; Commander of the Missile boat Flotillas; Commander of Haifa naval base; Deputy Commander of the Depth Corps; Chief of Navy Staff; Commander of the Israeli Navy
- Conflicts: South Lebanon conflict (1985–2000); First Intifada; Second Intifada; 2006 Lebanon War; Operation Cast Lead; Operation Pillar of Defense; Operation Brother's Keeper; Operation Protective Edge; Gaza war; 2026 Iran war

David Saar Salama (Hebrew: דוד סער סלמה; Born March 4, 1969) is an Israeli Vice Admiral (Aluf) who served as the Commander of the Israeli Navy from 2021 to 2026.

Previously he served as chief of the navy staff, deputy commander of the Depth Corps, commander of the Haifa naval base and more.

== Early life ==
Salama was born and grew up in Atlit. He began his studies at the military boarding school for command in Haifa, and after being expelled at the end of the 10th grade, he continued his studies at the Reali School in Haifa.

== Military service ==
He enlisted in the IDF in 1987, and volunteered for Shayetet 13. He completed the warrior course training in the Shayetet 13, and went to the infantry officers' course. At the end of the course, he returned to the Shayetet and was appointed a platoon commander, he has participated in combat in South Lebanon and West Bank. Later he served as the Intelligence officer of Shayetet 13. Afterwards he was a head instructor in the Shayetet 13. He completed the Israeli Naval Academy course. After that he went to study at the United States Naval War College. Upon his return, he completed training at the Naval Command School and served as a platoon officer in a Missile ship. After that, he was appointed commander of INS Yaffo.

In 2002, after he completed his academic studies, Salama was promoted to the rank of Commander (Sgan aluf) and appointed commander of the 916 squadron. Between the years 2006-2007 he has served as the head of field branch in the training department of the Navy. In 2007-2008 he has served as the commander of squadron 31 in the missile boat flotilla. In august of 2008 he was appointed commander of the Eilat naval base, in which he served until 2010.

In February of 2010 he was promoted to the rank of Captain (navy) (Aluf Mishne) and was appointed commander of the Ashdod naval base. during his time as the commander of the base he led the fighting in the Gaza Strip while cooperating with the Southern Command. He served in this position until August 2011. In 2011-2013 he served as the commander of the missile boats flotilla. afterwards he went to study in the National Security College.

On the 7th of August 2014 he was promoted to the rank of Rear Admiral (Tat Aluf) and was appointed commander of the Haifa naval base, a position in which he served until the 16th of August 2017. In the years 2017-2019 he has served as the commander of the Depth Corps. On the 15th of March 2019 he was appointed chief of the Navy's staff, a position in which he served until August 2021. On the 1st of September 2021 he was promoted to the rank of Vice Admiral (Aluf), and a day later was appointed as the commander of the Israeli navy.

During the Gaza war, the Chief Public Prosecutor's Office in Turkey issued an international arrest warrant for Salama on charges of genocide for his alleged involvement in Israeli atrocities in the Gaza Strip.

Spain's highest criminal court, the Audiencia Nacional, opened preliminary proceedings against Israeli political and military officials including Salama over the Israeli navy's assault on the Freedom Flotilla's Gaza-bound aid ship 'Madleen'.

In the UK, the Hind Rajab Foundation filed criminal complaints with the UK Metropolitan Police War Crimes Unit regarding the Israeli military assault on the British-flagged humanitarian vessel Handala in international waters on the night of 26–27 July 2025.

The INF use of lethal force against fishers without warning, and destruction of fishing infrastructure, under Salama, have been characterised as grave violations of international human rights law. The UN has pointed out that International humanitarian law explicitly prohibits the use of starvation of civilians as a method of warfare.

On 16 April 2026, Eyal Harel took command of the Israeli Navy from Salama during a ceremony at the Atlit naval base.

== Awards and decorations ==
Salama was awarded three campaign ribbons for his service during three wars.

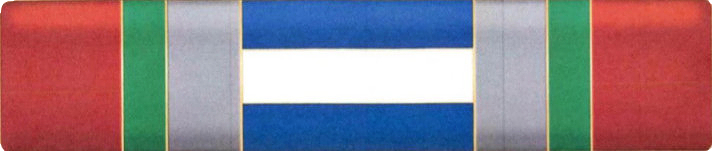

Second Lebanon War	South Lebanon Security Zone	Operation Protective Edge

== Personal life ==
Salama is married to Daphne and has three children. He has a bachelor's degree in business administration from the Rupin Academic Center, and a master's degree in humanities from the University of Haifa. He received an award from the Rupin Academic Center (Inspirational Graduates) for the year 2015, for his many years of contribution to Israel's security.
