= Argon ST =

Argon ST, a Boeing company
- Company type: Subsidiary
- Industry: Defense
- Predecessors: Argon Engineering Associates; SenSyTech, Inc.
- Founded: 1968 (in 2004, company took on current name)
- Headquarters: Fairfax, Virginia, United States
- Number of locations: Newington, Virginia; Smithfield, Pennsylvania; Ann Arbor, Michigan; Orlando, Florida; Mountain View, California; San Diego, California; Ventura, California
- Key people: John Rader (Vice President and General Manager); Terry L. Collins (Founder, Argon Engineering Associates)
- Products: Systems for signal intercept and identification, airborne imaging systems, threat warning systems, electronic intelligence, active electronic warfare systems, communications reconnaissance systems, torpedo countermeasures systems, imaging systems, communication systems, wireless networks and navigation systems
- Revenue: $782 million USD (2007)
- Number of employees: 1,000+
- Parent: Boeing Defense, Space & Security
- Website: www.argonst.com

Argon ST is a subsidiary of The Boeing Company headquartered in Fairfax, Virginia, United States, that specializes in systems engineering and provides command and control products.

Argon ST's efforts include developing systems for signal intercept and identification, airborne imaging systems, threat warning systems, electronic intelligence, active electronic warfare systems, communications reconnaissance systems, torpedo countermeasures systems, imaging systems, communication systems, wireless networks and navigation systems.

Argon ST systems support a full range of military and strategic units including surface and sub-surface, airborne, and land-based platforms serving defense, homeland security, and customers outside of the United States.

== Structure ==
Argon ST is a wholly owned, non-fully integrated subsidiary of The Boeing Company. It shares its business area with Digital Receiver Technologies (DRT), another subsidiary based in Germantown, Maryland. Together they are a part of Boeing's larger Electronic and Information Solutions (E&IS) division, which is headquartered at Argon ST's original location in Fairfax, Virginia. Electronic and Information Solutions is a part of Boeing Defense, Space, and Security (BDS), which are headquartered in Arlington, Virginia and St. Louis, Missouri, respectively.

On October 21, 2016, the E&IS division merged with Boeing's Strategic Missile and Defense Systems (SM&DS) division to form Strategic Defense and Intelligence Systems (SD&IS). On December 5, 2016, The E&SS division merged with Boeing Intelligence & Analytics (BI&A) to form Electronic Sensor & Intelligence Solutions (ES&IS). On December 13, 2016, Boeing Defense announced that they would be moving their headquarters from St. Louis to Boeing's Long Bridge office in Arlington to be closer to the Pentagon. ES&IS remains headquartered in Fairfax with SD&IS in Arlington.

== History ==
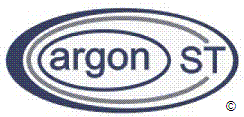
Argon ST logo before Boeing acquisition

Argon ST was created with the merger of SenSyTech, Inc. and Argon Engineering Associates on September 29, 2004. In August 2006, Argon ST acquired Innovative Research, Ideas & Services Corporation (IRIS), the authors of the sensor fusion software Transducer Markup Language (TML). On July 3, 2006, Argon ST completed the acquisition of San Diego Research Center (SDRC), achieving a corporate goal of being able to provide an end-to-end sensor system. Specifically, SDRC’s wireless communication technologies address the challenges of mobile military systems.

On October 1, 2005, Argon ST acquired Radix Technologies, bringing in signal processing technology for reconnaissance and navigation, complementing Argon ST’s core advanced signal intercept and processing capabilities and systems. On June 30, 2010, Argon ST announced that it would be acquired by The Boeing Company for approximately $775 million and integrated into the aerospace firm as an independent subsidiary under Boeing Defense, Space & Security. The acquisition was completed on August 5, 2010.
