= List of shipwrecks in 1973 =

The list of shipwrecks in 1973 includes ships sunk, foundered, grounded, or otherwise lost during 1973.

table of contents
1973
Jan	Feb	Mar	Apr
May	Jun	Jul	Aug
Sep	Oct	Nov	Dec
Unknown date

== January ==
=== 1 January ===
List of shipwrecks: 1 January 1973
Ship	State	Description
Donna R	United States	The fishing vessel sank in Port Etches in Prince William Sound on the south-central coast of Alaska.
Kelly B	United States	The fishing vessel exploded while refueling in Cedar Bay (60°33′30″N 146°00′30″W) in Prince William Sound on the south-central coast of Alaska.

=== 9 January ===
List of shipwrecks: 9 January 1973
Ship	State	Description
Dona Anita	Liberia	The cargo ship sank off Vancouver Island, with the loss of all 42 crew.

=== 21 January ===
List of shipwrecks: 21 January 1973
Ship	State	Description
Tide	Netherlands	The coaster caught fire off Northern Ireland, driving the crew to the bow area, unable to stop the ship's engine. The ship eventually ran aground at Bangor, County Down. The nine crew were rescued by HMS Bronington (Royal Navy).

=== 22 January ===
List of shipwrecks: 22 January 1973
Ship	State	Description
USS Batfish	United States Navy	The Sturgeon-class submarine ran aground off Charleston, South Carolina. She was later repaired and returned to service.

=== 31 January ===
List of shipwrecks: 31 January 1973
Ship	State	Description
Sankt Jacob	Cyprus	The cargo ship sank in Galite Bay, Bizerta, Tunisia.

== February ==
=== 2 February ===
List of shipwrecks: 2 February 1973
Ship	State	Description
Alcamo	Italy	The cargo ship struck rocks and was holed off Cap Rosso, Corsica. She was declared a constructive total loss and later scrapped.

=== 15 February ===
List of shipwrecks: 15 February 1973
Ship	State	Description
USS Sabalo	United States Navy	The Balao-class submarine was sunk as a target in the Pacific Ocean off San Diego, California.

=== 23 February ===
List of shipwrecks: 23 February 1973
Ship	State	Description
Iliamna	United States	The 17-gross register ton, 36-foot (11.0 m) fishing vessel was lost after she collided with a submerged log in Kachemak Bay on the south-central coast of Alaska.

== March ==
=== 3 March ===
List of shipwrecks: 3 March 1973
Ship	State	Description
Sounion	Lebanon	The passenger ship was sunk by a limpet mine at Beirut. Refloated in April but subsequently scrapped.

=== 4 March ===
List of shipwrecks: 4 March 1973
Ship	State	Description
Auralyn	United Kingdom	The yacht was struck by a whale and sank in the Pacific Ocean. Sailors Maurice and Maralyn Bailey were rescued after 117 days on a liferaft.
Neptune I	United States	The fishing vessel sank in the Gulf of Alaska between Cape Spencer in Southeast Alaska and Kodiak Island in the Kodiak Archipelago, about 150 nautical miles (280 km; 170 mi) south of Middleton Island off the south-central coast of Alaska. A United States Coast Guard helicopter rescued all five members of her crew from a life raft.

=== 12 March ===
List of shipwrecks: 12 March 1973
Ship	State	Description
Igara	Italy	The wreck of Igara's bow section, photographed on 1 May 2007 The ore-oil carrier hit a rock and was holed in the South China Sea. She later sank by the bow 70 nautical miles (130 km) off Singapore. Broke in two at № 1 hold on 19 March. The stern section was refloated and fitted with a new bow section, and returned to service as Eraclide.

=== 22 March ===
List of shipwrecks: 22 March 1973
Ship	State	Description
Anita	Norway	The cargo ship disappeared without a trace in a hurricane in the Atlantic Ocean with the loss of all 32 crew. This ship and Norse Variant sank in the same storm. No distress call was ever received. According to researchers, the ship was likely sunk by a rogue wave.
Loch Seaforth	United Kingdom	The ferry ran aground on Sleit Rock in the Sound of Gunna, between Tiree and Coll. All on board took to the lifeboats. Loch Seaforth was refloated but declared a constructive total loss and scrapped.
Norse Variant	Norway	The bulk carrier foundered in a hurricane in the Atlantic Ocean. The incident occurred in the same storm as the disappearance of Anita, and, like with that incident, was also likely caused by a rogue wave, according to researchers. Only one person survived of the 30 crew.
Thunder	Panama	The collier foundered north of Crete, Greece (36°44′N 26°11′E). She was on a voyage from Eleusis, Greece to Cyprus.

=== 27 March ===
List of shipwrecks: 27 March 1973
Ship	State	Description
Double Knot	United States	The 15-gross register ton, 34.1-foot (10.4 m) motor vessel disappeared near Nuka Bay (59°19′N 150°33′W) on the south-central coast of Alaska, 60 nautical miles (110 km; 69 mi) south of Seward, Alaska. The bodies of the four people on board were never found.

=== 28 March ===
List of shipwrecks: 28 March 1973
Ship	State	Description
Mariner	Cyprus	The ship sprang a leak and foundered in the Pacific Ocean (35°00′N 152°47′E). She was on a voyage from Havana, Cuba to Kobe, Japan.

== April ==
=== 2 April ===
List of shipwrecks: 2 April 1973
Ship	State	Description
Norderney	Netherlands	Norderney ashore at Scheveningen, 2 April 1973 (Photo: 7 April 1973) The Radio Veronica pirate radio ship was driven ashore at Scheveningen in a storm after her anchor chain snapped.

=== 4 April ===
List of shipwrecks: 4 April 1973
Ship	State	Description
Juzenny Burg	Soviet Union	The cargo ship collided with the fishing vessel Dany Gérard (France), which sank in the English Channel. Juzenny Burgh was escorted into Brest by the minesweeper Antho (Marine Nationale). All five crew on board Dany Gérard were killed.

=== 19 April ===
List of shipwrecks: 19 April 1973
Ship	State	Description
Point Chicot	United States	The tugboat sank in the Gulf of Mexico 120 miles (190 km) west of mouth of Tampa Bay, Florida.

=== 24 April ===
List of shipwrecks: 24 April 1973
Ship	State	Description
USS Force	United States Navy	The Aggressive-class minesweeper suffered an engine room fire and sank in the Pacific Ocean off Guam.

=== 27 April ===
List of shipwrecks: 27 April 1973
Ship	State	Description
Belle Virtue	West Germany	The coaster ship collided with Maritime Pioneer (Panama) in the English Channel and sank. All eight crew were rescued by Suderau (West Germany).
Globe Star	Singapore	The cargo ship ran aground on the Nyali Reef, off Mombasa, Kenya. Five people were killed during salvage operations in November 1973, the ship was later scrapped in situ.

== May ==
=== 3 May ===
List of shipwrecks: 3 May 1973
Ship	State	Description
USS Boyle	United States Navy	The decommissioned Benson-class destroyer was sunk as a target off the coast of Florida.

=== 5 May ===
List of shipwrecks: 5 May 1973
Ship	State	Description
Captain Niko	Somalia	The ship was sailing from Rotterdam to Alexandria with cargo fertilizer. In heavy seas the cargo shifted. The ship was taken in tow, but the list increased and the ship sank 3 miles north of Guernsey Channel Islands.

=== 6 May ===
List of shipwrecks: 6 May 1973
Ship	State	Description
Pacific Viking	United States	The 44-gross register ton motor vessel sank 1.4 nautical miles (2.6 km; 1.6 mi) off South Cape (54°40′N 163°04′W) outside of Squaw Harbor in Baralof Bay on Unga Island in the Shumagin Islands off the south coast of the Alaska Peninsula.

=== 11 May ===
List of shipwrecks: 11 May 1973
Ship	State	Description
Pramnos	Greece	The coaster collided with Tony (Italy) off Porto Stefano, Italy and sank with the loss of three of her fourteen crew.

=== 13 May ===
List of shipwrecks: 13 May 1973
Ship	State	Description
USS Blackfin	United States Navy	The decommissioned Balao-class submarine was torpedoed and sunk as a target in the Pacific Ocean off San Diego, California.

=== 15 May ===
List of shipwrecks: 15 May 1973
Ship	State	Description
Coast No. 3	United States	The 49-gross register ton, 63.4-foot (19.3 m) barge sank in Hawk Inlet (58°07′40″N 134°45′15″W) in Southeast Alaska.

=== 16 May ===
List of shipwrecks: 16 May 1973
Ship	State	Description
Hongkong Grace	Liberia	The tanker collided with Mina (South Africa) in Mossel Bay, South Africa and caught fire. She was scrapped in December 1973.

=== 21 May ===
List of shipwrecks: 21 May 1973
Ship	State	Description
USS Sturgeon	United States Navy	The Sturgeon-class submarine ran aground off St. Croix, United States Virgin Islands. She was later refloated, repaired and returned to service.

=== 24 May ===
List of shipwrecks: 24 May 1973
Ship	State	Description
USS Herndon	United States Navy	The decommissioned Gleaves-class destroyer was sunk as a target off Florida.
Star No. 70	United States	The 39-gross register ton, 61.4-foot (18.7 m) fishing vessel sank in the South Arm of Chomley Sound (55°17′N 132°04′W) off Prince of Wales Island in the Alexander Archipelago in Southeast Alaska.

== June ==
=== 2 June ===
List of shipwrecks: 31 May 1973
Ship	State	Description
Esso Brussels	Belgium	The tanker was struck by the container ship Sea Witch (United States), which had lost her steering in New York Harbor. Esso Brussels caught fire, killing thirteen crew; two crew were lost from Sea Witch. Esso Brussels was later repaired and returned to service.

=== 3 June ===
List of shipwrecks: 3 June 1973
Ship	State	Description
Ell-Dora	United States	The 17-gross register ton, 39-foot (11.9 m) fishing vessel was wrecked near Shuyak Island in Alaska's Kodiak Archipelago.
USS Gherardi	United States Navy	The decommissioned Gleaves-class destroyer was sunk as a target off Puerto Rico.

=== 12 June ===
List of shipwrecks: 12 June 1973
Ship	State	Description
Parima	Venezuela	The cargo ship caught fire at Rio de Janeiro, Brazil. She was consequently scrapped.

=== 13 June ===
List of shipwrecks: 13 June 1973
Ship	State	Description
K-56	Soviet Navy	The Echo-class submarine collided with Academician Berg (Soviet Union) and sank in Peter the Great Gulf with the loss of 27 lives.

=== 21 June ===
List of shipwrecks: 21 June 1973
Ship	State	Description
Eolos	Greece	The cargo ship was sunk by a mine 5 miles (8.0 km) off Tripoli, Libya.

=== 22 June ===
List of shipwrecks: 22 June 1973
Ship	State	Description
Pacific Pearl	United States	The 64-foot (19.5 m) shrimper sank only four minutes after she began to flood in heavy seas in the Shelikof Strait between the Kodiak Archipelago and mainland Alaska. Two of her four crewmen perished.

=== 25 June ===
List of shipwrecks: 25 June 1973
Ship	State	Description
Conoco Britannia	Liberia	The supertanker ran aground off Immingham, Lincolnshire, United Kingdom, and was holed when her anchor pierced the hull. She was refloated the next day.
Saudi	India	The merchantman-passenger ship with 98 passengers capsized in the Indian Ocean off the coast of Somalia with the loss of 40 people. The U.S. Navy destroyer USS Jonas Ingram rescued 48 surviving passengers and crew, and recovered nine bodies. The other 31 were reported missing and presumed dead.

=== 27 June ===
List of shipwrecks: 27 June 1973
Ship	State	Description
Becky	United States	The motor vessel sank in Bristol Bay off the coast of Alaska.

=== Unknown date ===
List of shipwrecks: Unknown date June 1973
Ship	State	Description
Carlson II	United States	The retired 70-foot (21.3 m) fishing trawler was scuttled as an artificial reef in the North Atlantic Ocean 3.6 nautical miles (6.7 km; 4.1 mi) off Sea Girt, New Jersey, in 70 feet (21 m) of water at 40°06.805′N 073°57.176′W.

== July ==
=== 4 July ===
List of shipwrecks: 4 July 1973
Ship	State	Description
Y-B-2	United States	The barge was lost by her towing vessel in the Bering Sea near Nunivak Island.

=== 6 July ===
List of shipwrecks: 6 July 1973
Ship	State	Description
Cherry Venture	Singapore	Cherry Venture The cargo ship was driven aground in a storm at Teewah Beach, Australia. She was scrapped in situ in 2007.
Clive Steele	Philippines	The landing ship, medium was struck by rockets in the Mekong Delta. She was beached and abandoned.

=== 19 July ===
List of shipwrecks: 19 July 1973
Ship	State	Description
Nordic Service	Panama	The supply vessel collided with Finn Trader (Finland) and sank off Great Yarmouth, United Kingdom with the loss of two of her twelve crew.

=== 20 July ===
List of shipwrecks: 20 July 1973
Ship	State	Description
Mr. George	United States	The 13-gross register ton motor vessel was wrecked in Cook Inlet on the south-central coast of Alaska.

=== 22 July ===
List of shipwrecks: 22 July 1973
Ship	State	Description
Glenfinlas	United Kingdom	The cargo ship caught fire at Port Kelang, Malaya when a fork-lift truck fell into her cargo whilst working in a hold. The ship was towed out of port and beached. Refloated in August, she was declared a constructive total loss and consequently scrapped.

=== 24 July ===
List of shipwrecks: 24 July 1973
Ship	State	Description
Federal	Norway	The trawler, a sold off Round Table-class trawler, sprung a leak, capsized and sank in the Norwegian Sea 80 miles (130 km) west of Kråkenes Lighthouse.

=== 28 July ===
List of shipwrecks: 28 July 1973
Ship	State	Description
USS Gunason	United States Navy	Gunason sinking. The decommissioned Buckley-class destroyer escort was sunk as a target in the Pacific Ocean off California.

=== Unknown date ===
List of shipwrecks: Unknown date 1973
Ship	State	Description
Canberra	United Kingdom	The cruise liner ran aground off Granada, West Indies. She was later refloated and returned to service.

== August ==
=== 5 August ===
List of shipwrecks: 5 August 1973
Ship	State	Description
A E C 41-28	United States	The 939-gross register ton barge sank in Southeast Alaska near Sitka, Alaska, between Galankin Island (57.0311°N 135.3267°W) and Katz Island (57°01′50″N 135°19′00″W).

=== 14 August ===
List of shipwrecks: 14 August 1973
Ship	State	Description
Canberra	United Kingdom	The cruise liner ran aground off St Thomas, British Virgin Islands. She was refloated on 15 August.

=== 19 August ===
List of shipwrecks: 19 August 1973
Ship	State	Description
Mira	United States	The 10-gross register ton, 32.6-foot (9.9 m) fishing vessel was wrecked in Frederick Sound in the Alexander Archipelago in Southeast Alaska near Cape Strait (56°59′55″N 133°05′30″W).

=== 23 August ===
List of shipwrecks: 23 August 1973
Ship	State	Description
Eleni M	Cyprus	The cargo ship ran aground and sank off the coast of Libya (32°00′N 24°40′E). She was on a voyage from Algiers, Algeria to Alexandria, Egypt.

=== 29 August ===
List of shipwrecks: 29 August 1973
Ship	State	Description
Pisces III	United Kingdom	The submarine sank in the Atlantic Ocean southwest of Ireland in 1,375 feet (419 m) of water. Both of her crew members survived for 76 hours in the vessel, which was raised after a multi-agency rescue effort.

=== 31 August ===
List of shipwrecks: 31 August 1973
Ship	State	Description
Baltika	Soviet Union	The cruise liner ran aground off Bermuda.

== September ==
=== 4 September ===
List of shipwrecks: 4 September 1973
Ship	State	Description
Edco	United States	The motor vessel was wrecked in Auke Bay in Juneau, Alaska.

=== 10 September ===
List of shipwrecks: 10 September 1973
Ship	State	Description
Kondor	Greece	The cargo ship collided with H Capelo (Portugal) in thick fog off Guernsey, Channel Islands and sank with the loss of ten crew.

=== 15 September ===
List of shipwrecks: 15 September 1973
Ship	State	Description
Scarlino Secondo	Italy	Prelude to the Corsican conflict: The waste-disposal ship was disabled at Follonica Bay, Italy, by the explosion of a device attached to the hull in a diver attack by Corsican nationalist militants.

=== 16 September ===
List of shipwrecks: 16 September 1973
Ship	State	Description
Jarl	United States	The motor vessel sank in Bristol Bay off Alaska.

=== 22 September ===
List of shipwrecks: 22 September 1973
Ship	State	Description
Uje	Panama	The cargo ship was gutted by fire at Antwerp, Belgium. She was consequently scrapped.

=== 25 September ===
List of shipwrecks: 25 September 1973
Ship	State	Description
USNS Sgt. Jack J. Pendleton	(United States) Military Sea Transportation Service	The Victory ship ran aground off Triton Island, Japan. Declared a constructive total loss. She was consequently scrapped.

=== 27 September ===
List of shipwrecks: 27 September 1973
Ship	State	Description
Condesito	Spain	The cargo ship sank in the Atlantic Ocean off Tenerife after running aground 50 metres (164 ft) from the Punta Rasca Lighthouse.
Elva V	United States	The 45-foot (13.7 m) crab-fishing vessel struck a rock and sank near Kodiak, Alaska. Her crew of three reached shore in a skiff and were rescued by a passing crab-fishing vessel.

=== 28 September ===
List of shipwrecks: 28 September 1973
Ship	State	Description
Leliegracht	Netherlands	The cargo ship sank off IJmuiden with the loss of five of her eleven crew.

=== 29 September ===
List of shipwrecks: 29 September 1973
Ship	State	Description
Viggo Hinrichsen	West Germany	The coaster foundered off Öland, Sweden. Both crew survived.

== October ==
=== 1 October ===
List of shipwrecks: 1 October 1973
Ship	State	Description
Growler	United States	The 160-foot (48.8 m) cargo ship capsized and sank in the Bering Strait 11 nautical miles (20 km; 13 mi) north of Wales, Alaska, with the loss of her entire crew of three.

=== 4 October ===
List of shipwrecks: 4 October 1973
Ship	State	Description
Cayo Largo 17	Cuba	The fishing boat was attacked and sunk by a Cuban-exile-operated boat. One militia member was killed in the attack on Cayo Largo 17 and the fishing boat Cayo Largo 34. Cuban helicopters rescued the survivors.
Cayo Largo 34	Cuba	The fishing boat was attacked and sunk by a Cuban-exile-operated boat. One militia member was killed in the attack on Cayo Largo 34 and the fishing boat Cayo Largo 17. Cuban helicopters rescued the survivors.

=== 5 October ===
List of shipwrecks: 5 October 1973
Ship	State	Description
Carolyn C	United States	The crab-fishing vessel was lost after she caught fire near the Pleiades Islands (60°14′00″N 148°00′40″W) in Prince William Sound on the south-central coast of Alaska. After abandoning ship, her crew was attacked by sea lions and nearly drowned, but all hands survived.

=== 6 October ===
List of shipwrecks: 6 October 1973
Ship	State	Description
Arwa	Yemen	Yom Kippur War: The cargo ship was shelled and sunk by Israeli Army artillery at Adabiya, Egypt in Suez Bay.
Hitin	Syrian Navy	Yom Kippur War: Battle of Latakia: The Yarmouk-class minesweeper was struck by three Gabriel missiles launched from INS Hanit (Israeli Navy) and sank.
No. 21	Syrian Navy	Yom Kippur War: Battle of Latakia: The No. 21-class missile boat was struck by Gabriel missiles launched from INS Garash (Israeli Navy) and sank.
No. 22	Syrian Navy	Yom Kippur War: Battle of Latakia: The No. 21-class missile boat was struck by Gabriel missiles launched from INS Garash (Israeli Navy) and sank (or sunk on 11 October).
No. 42	Syrian Navy	Yom Kippur War: Battle of Latakia: The No. 41-class missile boat was struck by Gabriel missiles launched from Israeli missile boats and was beached to prevent sinking. She was then shelled and sunk with 76 mm fire by INS Miznah (Israeli Navy).
No. 44	Syrian Navy	Yom Kippur War: Battle of Latakia: The No. 41-class missile boat was struck by Gabriel missiles launched from Israeli missile boats and sank.
Unknown Syrian torpedo boat	Syrian Navy	Yom Kippur War: Battle of Latakia: The Project 123 motor torpedo boat was shelled and sunk by INS Hanit (Israeli Navy).

=== 7 October ===
List of shipwrecks: 7 October 1973
Ship	State	Description
INS No. 864 and INS No. 867	Israeli Navy	Yom Kippur War: Battle of Marsa Talamat: Both Dabur-class patrol boats ran aground temporarily during the battle. One killed and seven wounded during the battle.
Unknown Egyptian assault boat	Egyptian Navy	Yom Kippur War: Battle of Marsa Talamat: The armed Bertram-built cabin cruiser was sunk at anchor at Telma, along with two rubber boats tied to it by INS No. 864 and INS No. 867 (both Israeli Navy).

=== 8 October ===
List of shipwrecks: 8 October 1973
Ship	State	Description
Egyptian missile boat No. 323	Egyptian Navy	Yom Kippur War: Battle of Baltim: The No. 301-class missile boat was struck by a Gabriel missile launched from INS Keshet (Israeli Navy) and was shelled and sunk by INS Misgav (Israeli Navy).
Egyptian missile boat No. 390	Egyptian Navy	Yom Kippur War: Battle of Baltim: The No. 301-class missile boat was struck by Gabriel missiles launched from Israeli missile boats and was shelled and sunk by INS Reshef (Israeli Navy).
Unknown Egyptian missile boat	Egyptian Navy	Yom Kippur War: Battle of Baltim: The No. 301-class missile boat ran aground during a battle with Israeli missile boats. Later refloated, repaired and returned to service.

=== 10 October ===
List of shipwrecks: 11 October 1973
Ship	State	Description
Randa	Lebanon	The cargo ship was sunk by a mine off Tripoli, Libya.
Unidentified missile boat	Egyptian Navy	Yom Kippur War: The No. 783-class missile boat was sunk by Israeli frogmen at Hurghada, Egypt.

=== 11 October ===
List of shipwrecks: 11 October 1973
Ship	State	Description
Cap de la Hague	France	The dredger capsized and sank off Calais. Six crew were trapped in the sunken vessel. One man was rescued after 68 hours.
Elvekema	United States	The motor vessel sank at Cordova, Alaska.
No. 22	Syrian Navy	Yom Kippur War: Second Battle of Latakia: The No. 21-class missile boat was struck by Gabriel missiles launched from INS Garash (Israeli Navy) and sank (or sunk on 6 October).
No. 43	Syrian Navy	Yom Kippur War: Second Battle of Latakia: The No. 41-class missile boat was struck by Gabriel missiles launched from Israeli Navy missile boats and was beached to prevent her from sinking.

=== 12 October ===
List of shipwrecks: 12 October 1973
Ship	State	Description
Ilya Mechnikov	Soviet Union	Yom Kippur War: The cargo ship was sunk by Israeli missile Boats at Tartus, Syria.

=== 13 October ===
List of shipwrecks: 13 October 1973
Ship	State	Description
Blythe Star	United Kingdom	The coaster foundered off Hobart, Tasmania. Nine crew took to a liferaft, but one died at sea and two others died of exposure when the liferaft landed near Dunalley nine days later.

=== 14 October ===
List of shipwrecks: 14 October 1973
Ship	State	Description
Bakr	Egypt	Yom Kippur War: The survey vessel was sunk near Ras Gharib, Egypt, by missiles fired by Israeli Air Force aircraft.
18 Egyptian fishing vessels	Egypt	Yom Kippur War: 18 fishing vessels were shelled and destroyed at Ras Gharib, Egypt by INS No. 861, INS No. 862, INS No. 863, INS No. 864, and INS No. 881 (all Israeli Navy).

=== 16 October ===
List of shipwrecks: 14 October 1973
Ship	State	Description
African Glen	United States	Yom Kippur War: The blocked in cargo ship was sunk by Israeli Air Force aircraft in the Suez Canal, Egypt in the Bitter Lakes. Two Egyptian soldiers were killed.
Dauntless	United States	The 91-foot (27.7 m) crab- and halibut-fishing vessel departed Ketchikan, Alaska, bound for Kodiak on Kodiak Island and was never heard from again. The bodies of the four people aboard were never found.
Unknown submersible	Israeli Navy	Yom Kippur War: Operation Lady: Battle of Port Said: The Hazir submersible was lost during the operation. Two frogmen killed, one missing.

=== 17 October ===
List of shipwrecks: 17 October 1973
Ship	State	Description
Whitney	United States	The crab fishing vessel sank in 180 feet (55 m) of water in rough weather in the Gulf of Alaska off the southwest coast of Kodiak Island about 20 nautical miles (37 km; 23 mi) southwest of Cape Alitak. Her entire crew survived and was rescued by the fishing vessel Lourie Lynn (United States).

=== 21 October ===
List of shipwrecks: 21 October 1973
Ship	State	Description
Unidentified Egyptian missile boats	Egyptian Navy	Yom Kippur War: The No. 41-class missile boats were sunk by Gabriel missiles launched from Israeli Navy Sa'ar-class missile boats at Damietta.

=== 23 October ===
List of shipwrecks: 23 October 1973
Ship	State	Description
Hadiotis	Cyprus	Yom Kippur War: The cargo ship was torpedoed and sunk by an Egyptian submarine 60 nautical miles (110 km; 69 mi) north of Alexandria, Egypt. 14 crew killed.

=== 24 October ===
List of shipwrecks: 24 October 1973
Ship	State	Description
Unidentified motor torpedo boat	Egyptian Navy	Yom Kippur War: Israeli forces captured and scuttled the Project 123K motor torpedo boat was captured at Adabiya, Egypt in Suez Bay.

=== 25 October ===
List of shipwrecks: 25 October 1973
Ship	State	Description
Gotze Delched	Bulgaria	The cargo ship sank in a storm at Palermo, Italy.
Nuova Ustica	Italy	The ferry sank in a storm at Palermo.

=== 26 October ===
List of shipwrecks: 26 October 1973
Ship	State	Description
Siris	Israel	The tanker was sunk in the Strait of Jubal, Gulf of Suez by an Egyptian mine. Later raised and recovered.

=== Unknown date ===
List of shipwrecks: Unknown date October 1973
Ship	State	Description
Atka Queen	United States	The 105-foot (32.0 m) crab-fishing vessel sank during her maiden voyage from Puget Sound in Washington to Dutch Harbor in the Aleutian Islands. The United States Coast Guard rescued her crew of five in the North Pacific Ocean off the coast of British Columbia, Canada, near the Strait of Juan de Fuca.

== November ==
=== 3 November ===
List of shipwrecks: 3 November 1973
Ship	State	Description
Sunde	United States	The crab-fishing vessel was wrecked in the Shelikof Strait between the Kodiak Archipelago and mainland Alaska while operating in 40-foot (12.2-meter) seas. Her entire crew of three was rescued by a United States Coast Guard helicopter.

=== 6 November ===
List of shipwrecks: 6 November 1973
Ship	State	Description
Golar Patricia	Liberia	The supertanker exploded and sank in the Atlantic Ocean with the loss of one of the 44 people on board. The survivors were rescued by the ocean liner Cabo San Vicente (Spain).
Rebel	United States	The fishing vessel sank in Frederick Sound off the northeast coast of Kupreanof Island in the Alexander Archipelago in Southeast Alaska abeam of Big Creek and Cape Fanshaw (57°11′N 133°33′W).

=== 15 November ===
List of shipwrecks: 15 November 1973
Ship	State	Description
British Mallard	United Kingdom	The tanker ran aground at Grimsnes, Norway.
USS Fitch	United States Navy	The decommissioned Gleaves-class destroyer was sunk as a target off Florida.

=== 18 November ===
List of shipwrecks: 18 November 1973
Ship	State	Description
Gapern	Sweden	The cargo ship sprang a leak and sank 50 nautical miles (93 km) off the coast of Northumberland. All eleven crew were rescued by the trawler Kingston Emerald (United Kingdom).
Seafarer	United States	The shrimper sank in the Gulf of Alaska off the west coast of Kodiak Island 2 nautical miles (3.7 km; 2.3 mi) north of Uganik Bay (57°50′N 153°32′W). A United States Coast Guard helicopter rescued her entire crew of four.

=== 23 November ===
List of shipwrecks: 23 November 1973
Ship	State	Description
Annette	Cyprus	The cargo ship collided with the harbour wall and sank at Ashdod, Israel, killing 21 of her 24 crew.

=== 26 November ===
List of shipwrecks: 26 November 1973
Ship	State	Description
Armas	Cyprus	The cargo ship ran aground off Alderney, Channel Island with the loss of one of her 23 crew.

=== Unknown date ===
List of shipwrecks: Unknown date November 1973
Ship	State	Description
British Mallard	United Kingdom	The tanker ran aground at Grimsnes, Norway.
USS Haraden	United States Navy	The decommissioned Fletcher-class destroyer was sunk as a target.

== December ==
=== 4 December ===
List of shipwrecks: 4 December 1973
Ship	State	Description
USS Frankford	United States Navy	The decommissioned Gleaves-class destroyer was sunk as a target off Puerto Rico.
Western Salvor	United States	While under tow by a tug and carrying a cargo of 1,000,000 board feet (2,360 cubic meters) of sawlogs, the logging barge broke loose in rough seas, drifted ashore on the south coast of Kruzof Island in the Alexander Archipelago in Southeast Alaska, and broke up in the surf.

=== 6 December ===
List of shipwrecks: 6 December 1973
Ship	State	Description
Navena	United Kingdom	The 39.9-foot (12.2 m) fishing vessel was driven ashore on rocks in severe weather at Copensay, Orkney Islands and sank with only her wheelhouse above water. Crew rescued by a Sikorsky S-61 helicopter in 100 MPH wind..

=== 13 December ===
List of shipwrecks: 13 December 1973
Ship	State	Description
Kergall	France	The Guilvinec, France-based fishing vessel dragged her anchor whilst sheltering from a southerly gale and went ashore at Chyandour 100 metres (110 yd) west of Penzance railway station, Cornwall, United Kingdom.

=== 19 December ===
List of shipwrecks: 19 December 1973
Ship	State	Description
Oriental Monarch	Liberia	The cargo ship foundered 150 nautical miles (280 km) off Victoria, British Columbia with the loss of all 40 crew.

=== 21 December ===
List of shipwrecks: 21 December 1973
Ship	State	Description
Grayfish	United Kingdom	The 94.25-foot (28.73 m), 153-ton oilfield standby (safety) boat, a former trawler, was wrecked near Pundsta Point, 15 miles (24 km) from Lerwick, Shetland Islands.

=== 23 December ===
List of shipwrecks: 23 December 1973
Ship	State	Description
Island Pearl	Singapore	The cargo ship capsized and sank 7 nautical miles (13 km) off the Vung Tau Lighthouse, Vietnam (10°14′N 106°59′E). She was on a voyage from Phnom Penh, Cambodia to Singapore.

=== 25 December ===
List of shipwrecks: 25 December 1973
Ship	State	Description
Elwood Mead	United States	The bulk carrier ran aground on her maiden voyage off Guernsey, Channel Islands. She was refloated on 24 February 1974 despite having sustained a hurricane a month before.

== Unknown date ==
List of shipwrecks: Unknown date 1973
Ship	State	Description
H. W. Long	United States	The 53-foot (16.2 m) tug was reported in 1973 to have sunk. Her wreck lies in 70 feet (21 m) of water in the North Atlantic Ocean off Sandy Hook, New Jersey, at 40°25.433′N 073°52.204′W.
USNS Sgt. Jack J. Pendleton	United States Naval Service	The Lt. James E. Robinson-class cargo ship ran aground off Triton Island, South China Sea and was abandoned.
Kuroshio	Japan Maritime Self-Defense Force	The decommissioned Gato-class submarine was sunk as a target.
Levernbank	United Kingdom	The cargo ship ran aground near Matarani, Peru. She was refloated but consequently sank.
Thames	United States	The 55-foot (16.8 m) tug sank during a storm in 100 to 130 feet (30 to 40 m) of water in Long Island Sound 5 nautical miles (9.3 km; 5.8 mi) northwest of Horton's Point in Southold, Long Island, New York, and 6 nautical miles (11 km; 6.9 mi) south-southwest of Cornfield Point at 41°09.321′N 072°25.068′W in the autumn of 1973.
Westmoreland	United Kingdom	The Thames barge foundered in the River Medway at Hoo, Kent.
YOGN-119 or YON 367	United States Navy	The tank barge was sunk as a target sometime in 1973.
