= Keshet =

Keshet (Hebrew: קשת, 'rainbow') may refer to:

== People ==
- Ben-Zion Keshet (1914–1984), Israeli politician
- Eli Keshet (born 1945), Israeli biochemist
- Joseph Keshet , Israeli professor, expert in human speech processing and machine learning
- Leah Keshet, Israeli–Canadian mathematical biologist
- Shula Keshet (born 1959), Israeli activist and publisher
- Yeshurun Keshet (1893–1977), Israeli writer

== Other uses ==
- Keshet Media Group, an Israeli mass media company
  - Keshet International
- Keshet (organization), a Jewish LGBTQ nonprofit organization in the U.S.
- Keshet (Israeli settlement), an Israeli moshav/settlement in the Golan Heights
- INS Keshet, the name of two ships of the Israeli Sea Corps
- Keshet Cave, a natural arch, Israel
