= USNS Sgt. Jack J. Pendleton =

Cargo ship of the United States Navy

- A typical Victory ship

History

United States
- Name: SS Mandan Victory; Sgt. Jack J. Pendleton
- Namesake: Jack J. Pendleton awarded the Medal of Honor
- Ordered: as type (VC2-S-AP3) hull, MCV hull 109
- Builder: Oregon Shipbuilding Corporation, Portland, Oregon
- Laid down: 15 April 1944, as SS Mandan Victory
- Launched: 26 May 1944
- Sponsored by: Mrs. George C. Carter
- Completed: 19 June 1944
- Commissioned: 23 April 1948, by the U.S. Army as USAT Sgt. Jack J. Pendelton
- Decommissioned: 1 March 1950
- In service: 1 March 1950 as Aircraft Transport USNS Sgt Jack J. Pendelton (T-AKV-5)
- Out of service: 1973
- Reclassified: 7 May 1956 Cargo Ship USNS Sgt Jack J. Pendelton (T-AK-276)
- Stricken: 1973
- Home port: San Francisco, California; Oakland, California
- Identification: Hull symbol:T-AKV-5; Hull symbol:T-AK-276
- Fate: grounded on Triton Island in 1973, attempts at trying to remove the ship from the reef failed

General characteristics
- Class & type: Lt. James E. Robinson-class cargo ship
- Displacement: 4,512 metric tons (4,441 long tons) (standard); 16,199 metric tons (15,943 long tons) (full load)
- Length: 455 ft (139 m)
- Beam: 62 ft (19 m)
- Draft: 28 ft 7 in (8.71 m)
- Installed power: 8,500 shp (6,300 kW)
- Propulsion: 1 × steam turbine; 1 × shaft
- Speed: 16 knots (30 km/h; 18 mph)
- Complement: 55
- Armament: none

USNS Sgt. Jack J. Pendleton (T-AKV-5 /T-AK-276) was a Lt. James E. Robinson-class cargo ship constructed during World War II as a Victory ship and named the SS Mandan Victory. The Mandan Victory was placed into service by the War Shipping Administration's Emergency Shipbuilding program under cognizance of the U.S. Maritime Commission.

Post-war she was acquired by the U.S. Army and placed into service as USAT Sgt. Jack J. Pendleton. In 1950 she was reacquired by the Navy and placed into service as the USNS Sgt Jack J. Pendleton (T-AKV-5). Pendleton continued to serve her country throughout the Korean War and Vietnam War.

In 1973, while sailing in the Paracel Islands, Sgt Jack J. Pendleton struck a reef off Triton Island. Attempts to remove her from the reef failed, and she was abandoned.

== Victory ship built in Oregon ==
Sgt. Jack J. Pendleton was laid down under Maritime Commission contract as Mandan Victory (MCV hull 109) on 15 April 1944 by the Oregon Shipbuilding Corp., Portland, Oregon; launched on 26 May 1944; sponsored by Mrs. George C. Carter; and delivered to the Maritime Commission's War Shipping Administration on 19 June 1944. She built under the Emergency Shipbuilding program.

== World War II service ==
Operated under a general agency agreement by the Isthmian Steamship Co. for the remainder of World War II and during the postwar period, Mandan Victory was subsequently operated by the Waterman Steamship Corporation and by A. L. Burbank and Co. In December 1947, she was laid up with the National Defense Reserve Fleet at Wilmington, Delaware.

== Transferred to the U.S. Army ==
On 23 April 1948, she was transferred to the Army. Renamed Sgt. Jack J. Pendleton, the Victory ship received miscellaneous alterations, including the addition of radar and the enlargement of her hatches, during the summer; and, in the fall, she commenced 18 months of operations under the Army Transportation Service.

== Acquired by MSTS ==
On 1 March 1950, the ship was transferred to the Navy for operation by the newly established Military Sea Transportation Service (MSTS), now the Military Sealift Command.

Designated as a cargo ship and aircraft ferry, the former Army ship was given a civil service crew; placed in service as USNS Sgt. Jack J. Pendleton (T-AKV-5); and assigned to transpacific operations from her home port, San Francisco, California.

== Korean War service ==
In late June, as the war in Korea broke out, she completed her second round trip to Japan as an MSTS ship and, for the next two years, was employed in moving combat cargoes westward. In the summer of 1952, however, she was shifted to runs to the Marshall Islands and the Mariana Islands; and, in March 1953, she resumed a Far East Schedule which she maintained until after the s:Korean Armistice Agreement.

== Post-Korean War service ==
From 1954 to 1956, her destinations ranged from islands in the Central Pacific Ocean, to Japan, Korea, Okinawa, Taiwan, the Philippine Islands, and Thailand. During the summer of 1956, she conducted arctic operations. On board was poet and yeoman Allen Ginsberg, who used the ship's mimeograph to print 52 copies of "Siesta in Xbalba", his first publication, while the ship was anchored off Icy Cape, Alaska.

With the fall, resumed her schedule in the more temperate and tropical zones of the Pacific.

=== Rescuing a Japanese crew at sea ===
In 1958, she was commended for rescuing the entire crew of a large Japanese fishing vessel which had gone down in the Pacific; and, in the same year, she again added northern ports in the Aleutians to her delivery points.

=== Temporary service in the Atlantic ===
In 1959, after calls at ports on the Indian Ocean, the Arabian Sea, and the Gulf of Aden, the ship transited the Suez Canal to take on and deliver cargo in the Mediterranean. From there, she moved into the Atlantic Ocean and, in late March, arrived at New York City. She then continued on to Norfolk, Virginia, whence, for the next two months, she conducted transatlantic runs.

Redesignated AK-276 (7 May 1956), Sgt. Jack J. Pendleton carried supplies to northern bases in Greenland in July and in August; and, in September, she sailed for northern Europe, whence she made her way back to the Pacific via the Suez Canal.

During October and November, she put into ports on the Indian subcontinent, in southeast Asia, on the island of Taiwan, and on the Korean peninsula. In early December, she was in Japan; and, on the 29th, she arrived at Seattle, Washington, whence, with the new year 1960, she returned to San Francisco to resume transpacific operations.

Later in that year, the Victory ship interrupted her more routine schedule to bring the Navy's bathyscaph, Trieste, back to San Diego, California, after the research vessel had set a record dive of 35,800 feet in the Mariana Trench.

== Vietnam War service ==
Later in the 1960s, as the Vietnam War necessitated a speed-up in the supply line, she was employed in shuttling cargo from Subic Bay to South Vietnam.

Since that time, and until, September 23, 1973, when it went aground. Sgt. Jack J.Pendleton, had been home ported in Oakland, California.

== Grounding ==
While sailing from Vietnam and returning to the United States on September 23, 1973, transiting the Paracel Islands, a group of small islands and reefs in the South China Sea. These islands were normally used for navigation, particularly Triton Island, which was at the Western end of a straight West-to-East passage thru the gap between the Paracels and the Spratly Islands. The ship planned to turn East once it cleared Triton Island, not knowing that wind and waves had set the Pendleton to the north. Sgt. Jack J. Pendleton ran aground on a reef at Triton Island at 17 1/2 knots, very early in the morning, so smoothly that the Captain was not disturbed in his cabin. Various attempts were made to salvage her, however, those attempts failed, the cargo was removed, and she was abandoned.

The salvage operation was conducted by the USS Mount Vernon, USS Mount Hood, USS Deliver, USS Reclaimer and USS Duluth. The major interest in the Sgt Jack Pendleton to the US Government were two large railroad car generators. One of these generators was loaded on the bow, making direct salvage of the ship almost impossible. There were cases of old rifles and cases of ammunition on board as well. After many attempts, including an unsuccessful attempt by the embarked UDT/Seals (Underwater Demolition Team)from the Deliver to blow a hole in the reef surrounding Triton Island to facilitate the salvage operation using LCU-8s instead of the CH-46 and CH-53 helicopters from Mount Vernon and Mount Hood, members of all five ships were sent aboard the Sgt Jack Pendleton to salvage whatever was felt could be used for the rest of their deployments. The main cargo on the ship was contaminated ammunition for large caliber guns that was being returned from Vietnam to the US. These large shells were stowed in holds both fore and aft. Although a hole was blown in the reef, it was felt that removal of the ammunition by crane was not possible. It was determined that leaving a large ship loaded with unstable ammunition and grounded on an island claimed by multiple countries (some friendly, some not) was not a diplomatic thing to do. The only possible method to remove all this unstable ammunition was by helicopter. An EOD team from the Mount Hood was sent aboard to remove any masts that would prevent the helicopter from reaching the hold located amidships. In a well-orchestrated set of explosions, the main mast amidships was severed at its base, and then 1/2 a second later blown over the port side of the ship. It dropped vertically from the height it had on the ship into the clear water just to port side. Hundreds of pallets of large caliber shells were then lifted by Mount Hoods helicopters, using a lanyard that was more than 100 ft long, from the Sgt Jack Pendleton and set down on the flight deck of Mount Vernon, whose deck crewmen then moved them via pallet jack to a point where they could be reached by Mount Vernons cranes and lowered into the mezzanine and well deck, a very hazardous operation given the nature of the live ammo and the pitching of the ship in the open ocean. Duluth's electronics technicians salvaged the radar antenna and communications gear onboard and transferred it by CH-46 to the flight deck of the Duluth.

The USS Beaufort put to sea again on 25 September to help to refloat the grounded Sgt. Jack J. Pendleton and returned to Subic Bay from that mission on 9 October. As the storm subsided, Beaufort and Reclaimerhooked their steel cables and beach gear to the aft section of Sgt. Jack J. Pendleton and attempted to tow her off of the snow white coral reef; there was no moving the ship. A barge was supplied from the Deliver to unload the ammunition, and get it to South Vietnam, the unloading was completed by the sailors of Sgt. Jack J. Pendleton.

While the unloading was being completed, the crews of Beaufort and Reclaimer put its Navy Divers, Scuba, and Hard Hat Divers into the water to recon the bottom hull of Sgt. Jack J. Pendleton. Beaufort and Reclaimer Hull Technician Divers, and the Explosive Ordnance Demolition E.O.D. Divers noticed a crack in the hull; it was a gap between four inches to twelve inches, and compartments were flooded, which added additional weight. The bow of Sgt. Jack J. Pendleton was protruding approximately twenty feet up toward the sky. Additional ships were dispatched to the scene to assist in pulling the ship off the reef. During the same time, China sent a message stating it owned the island and to stop all procedures and depart the island; North Vietnam also stated it owned the coral reef and to make haste out of the area or it would send a warship to engage the Navy ships, both dispatches were taken seriously, however, neither country possessed an operational naval vessel nearby. All towing attempts failed, and a typhoon was closing in on the area. Beaufort and Reclaimer made one final attempt October 4th. Another ship rammed the starboard side of "Beaufort", nearly crushing a sailor, as the I-Beam of the other ship crushed-in the side of Beaufort. The ship was hit so hard, the mast began to shake violently, and the men on the ship's bridge were on the deck waiting for it to crash. Beaufort removed all men from Sgt. Jack J. Pendleton, and loaded Divers into a Mike Boat, Landing Craft. The Divers took dive equipment, and demolitions supplied from Deliver to the 'Pendleton', and set charges to the hull. After retreating approximately 1,000 yards, the charges exploded, and the ship was there "for the duration". It was used as a Radar Beacon for aircraft. Beaufort Hull Technicians shored its bulkhead with wood and steel, until it could get back to port for major repairs. During repairs, a U.S. Naval Destroyer was docked starboard side to Beaufort.

== Honors and awards ==
Qualified vessel personnel were qualified for the following:

- National Defense Service Medal
- Vietnam Service Medal
- Republic of Vietnam Campaign Medal

== Note ==
Some accounts of this vessel give her name as "Pendelton" instead of the correct name "Pendleton" which is the spelling of the person for which she was named by the Navy.
