= Condesito =

Cargo ship

History
- Completed: December 1945
- Fate: Sank 27 September 1973

General characteristics
- Tonnage: 400 GRT
- Length: 43.9m

Condesito was a cargo ship that sank on 27 September 1973 near Las Galletas on the south coast of Tenerife in the Canary Islands and is now a well known recreational dive site. The ship was transporting cement for the construction of Los Cristianos.

== Last voyage ==
The ship ran aground about 50 meters (55 yards; 165 feet) from where the Punta Rasca Lighthouse later was constructed. There were no deaths.

== Recreational dive site ==
The ship now lies in around 18 m (59 ft) of water, with the deepest point at 21 m (69 ft) and its highest point at 6 m (20 ft). Visibility can be in excess of 35 m (115 ft).

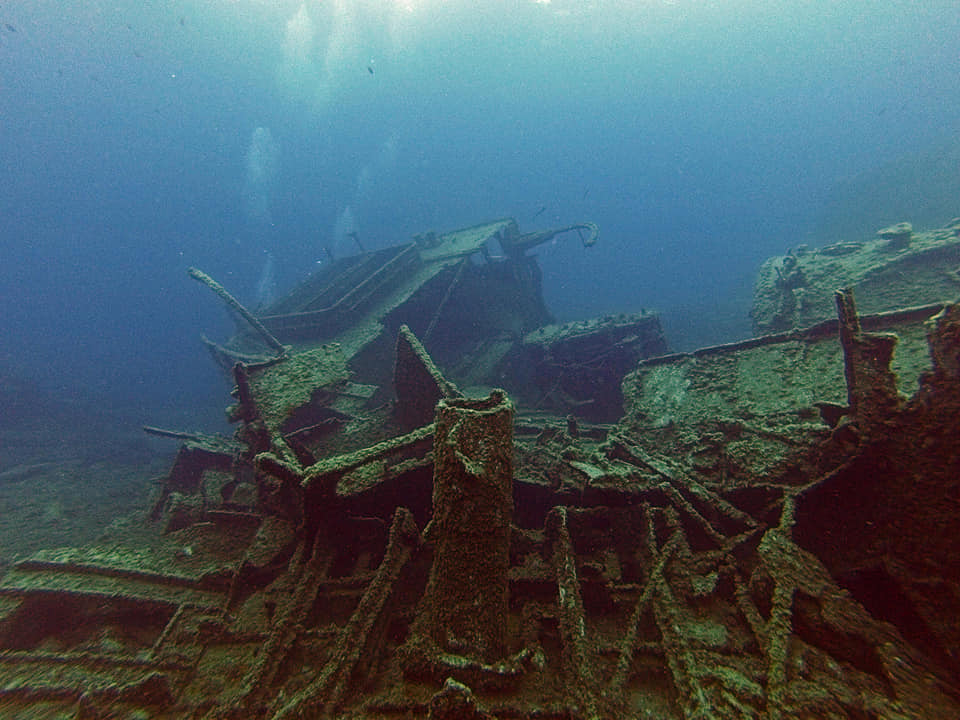
The wreckage of the El Condesito

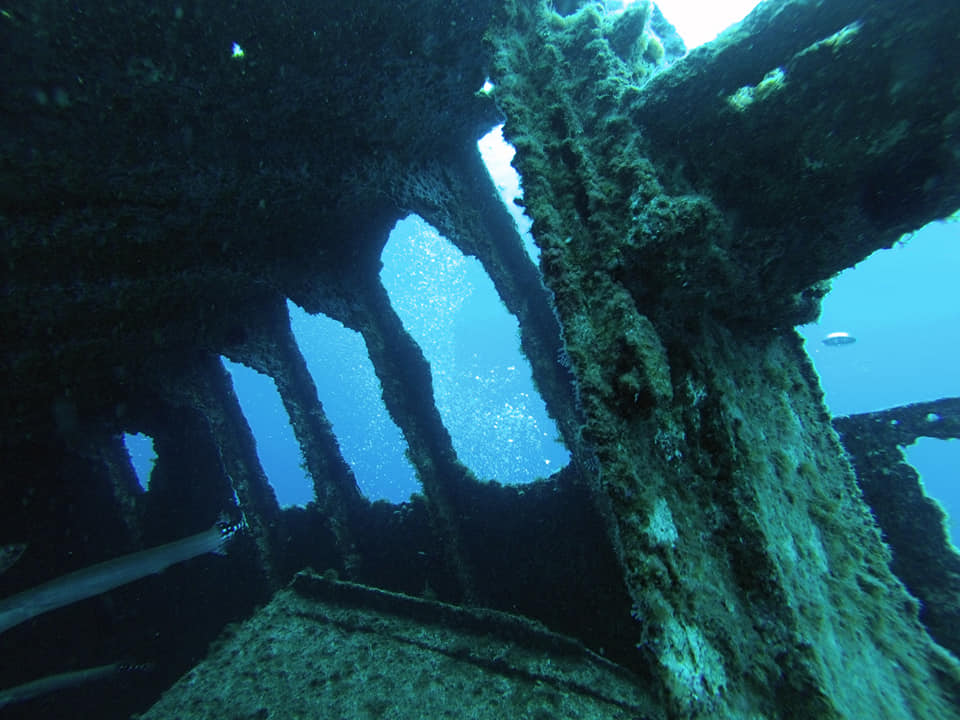
View of the interior of the wreck

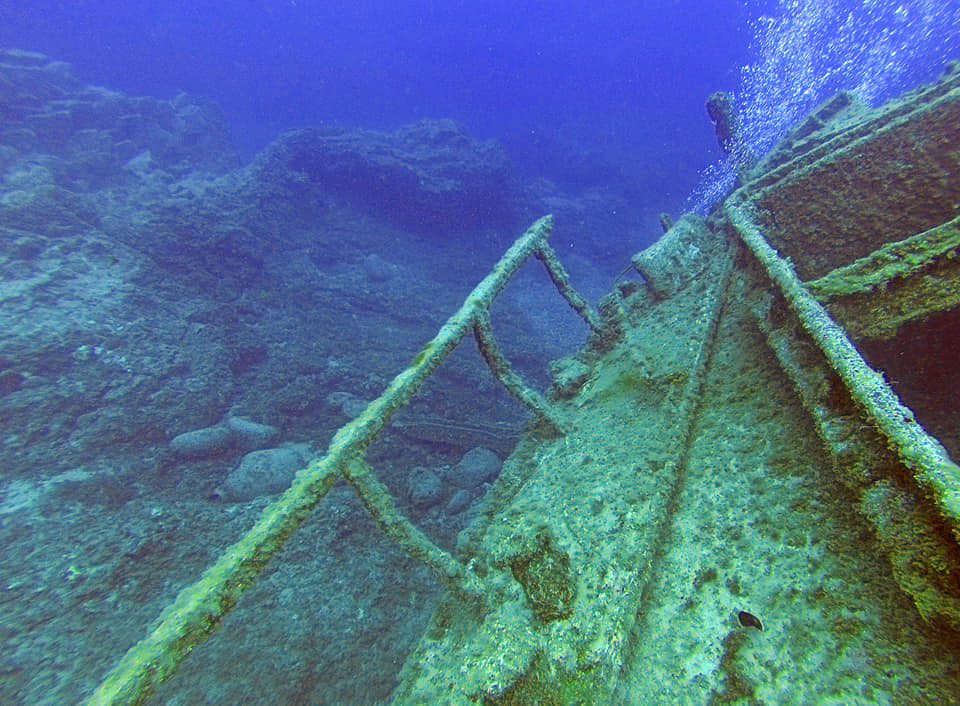
View of the wreck looking east
