= Triton Island =

Island in the South China Sea

Disputed island
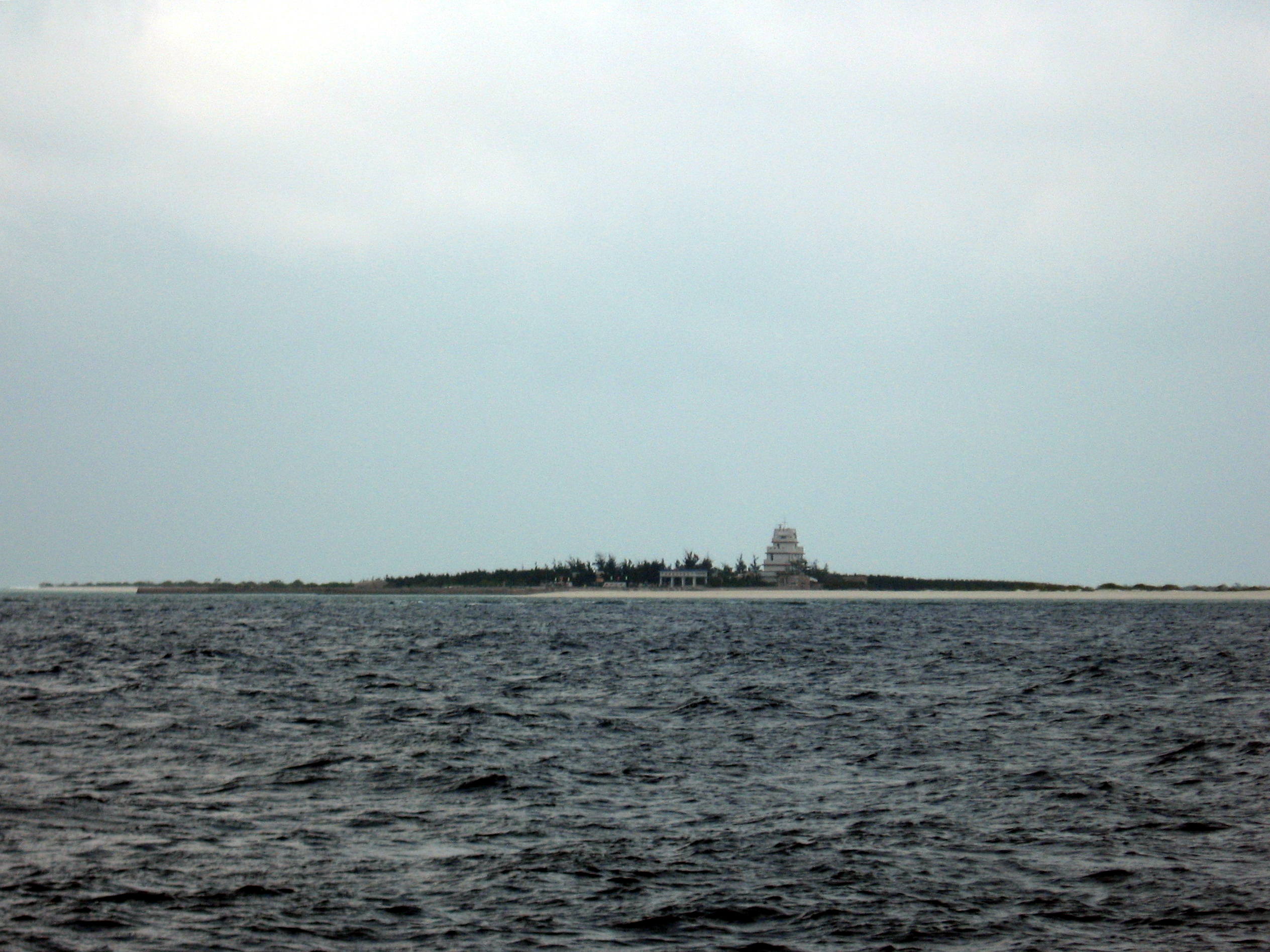
- Triton Island from the west

- Location within South China Sea
- Other names: Chinese: 中建岛; pinyin: Zhōngjiàn Dǎo; Vietnamese: đảo Tri Tôn

Geography
- Location: South China Sea
- Coordinates: 15°47′2″N 111°11′52″E
- Archipelago: Paracel Islands
- Area: 7 ha (17 acres)
- Length: 0.33 km (0.205 mi)
- Width: 0.28 km (0.174 mi)

Administration
- People's Republic of China

Claimed by
- People's Republic of China
- Republic of China (Taiwan)
- Vietnam

Demographics
- Population: 0

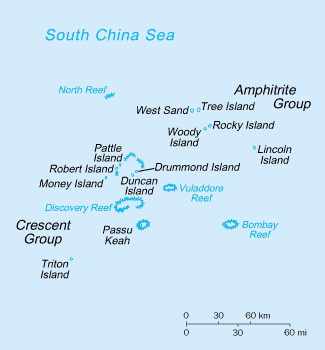
Location of Triton Island within the Paracel Islands

Triton Island (Chinese: 中建岛; pinyin: Zhōngjiàn Dǎo; Vietnamese: đảo Tri Tôn) is the westernmost and southernmost of the Paracel Islands in the South China Sea. It is located on the southwest corner of Triton Reef and has an area of 7 hectares (17 acres) above sea-level. The reef including the island measures about 120 hectares (300 acres) in area. The island is administered by the People's Republic of China, and is also claimed by the Republic of China (Taiwan) and Vietnam.

The island was historically known by the Chinese as Bànlù Zhì (Chinese: 半路峙; lit. 'halfway tower'), and as Luó Dǎo (Chinese: 螺岛; lit. 'snail island') to Chinese fishermen. Other Chinese sources have it named as 南建岛, as it was the southernmost point claimed by China until after 1933. The current Chinese name commemorates the Republic of China Navy warship ROCS Chung-chien (中建號) sent in 1946 to claim the Paracel Islands.

== History ==
Lacking a native population, ownership of the Paracel Islands has been disputed since the early 20th century. In the aftermath of the First Indochina War, until 1974 Vietnam occupied Pattle Island, approximately 50 nautical miles (93 km) northeast. Control has been enforced by the People's Republic of China since the Battle of the Paracel Islands.

In 1973 the cargo ship USNS Sgt. Jack J. Pendleton was abandoned on the reef of Triton Island, having run aground there en route from Vietnam to the Philippines.

The USS Mount Vernon (LSD-39) with other units, including UDT teams, salvaged cargo from the J.J. Pendleton in fall of 1973. The passage through the reef, in the southwest corner of the island, was to allow amphibious craft access to the beach to offload cargo. This operation continued for about one month. Pendleton had originally run around on Triton Island during a typhoon in October and was further driven ashore in the midst of three additional typhoons in the following weeks.

On April 10, 1979, Vietnam sent three armed ships to try to land, but they were captured by the troops stationed on the island, with a total of 24 people. This incident became one of the basis for the commendation of this troops in August 1982.

In 2023, China seemingly started to build an airstrip on the island. In 2024, China began upgrading its military presence on the island to include a synthetic-aperture radar for tracking stealth aircraft.

== Freedom of navigation maneuvers ==
On January 30, 2016, the United States warship USS Curtis Wilbur passed within 12 nautical miles of the island. The Pentagon stated that it had notified none of the three claimants to the island beforehand, and stated the reason for the transit was to protect freedom of navigation, "consistent with international law". The People's Republic of China called the voyage "provocative" and that it "violated relevant Chinese laws by entering Chinese territorial waters without prior permission".

In July 2017, the guided missile destroyer USS Stethem navigated within 12 miles (19 km) of Triton island as part of a FONOP (Freedom of navigation operation).

In May 2018, the guided missile destroyer USS Higgins navigated within 12 miles (19 km) of Triton island as part of a FONOP (Freedom of navigation operation).
