= USNS Lt. James E. Robinson =

Cargo ship of the United States Navy

History

United States
- Name: Czechoslovakia Victory
- Namesake: Czechoslovakia
- Owner: War Shipping Administration
- Operator: American-Hawaiian SS Company
- Ordered: as type (VC2-S-AP2) hull, MCV hull 86
- Builder: Oregon Shipbuilding Corporation, Portland, Oregon
- Laid down: 25 November 1943, as SS Czechoslovakia Victory
- Launched: 20 January 1944
- Christened: Miss Barbara Vickery
- Completed: March 11, 1944
- Honors and awards: one battle star for World War II service
- Fate: Transferred to US Navy in 1946

History

United States
- Name: USNS Lt. James E. Robinson
- Namesake: James E. Robinson, Jr.
- Operator: US Navy
- Commissioned: 3 May 1948 as USAT Lt. James E. Robinson
- In service: 1 March 1950 as Aircraft Transport USNS Lt. James E. Robinson (T-AKV-3)
- Reclassified: December 1962, as Miscellaneous Auxiliary USNS Lt. James E. Robinson (T-AG-170), a cable transport ship; 1 July 1964, as Cargo Ship USNS Lt. James E. Robinson (T-AK-274) =
- Stricken: 16 January 1981
- Identification: Hull symbol:T-AKV-3; Hull symbol:T-AG-170; Hull symbol:T-AK-274
- Fate: sold for scrapping, 26 May 1983, to Andy Exports, Inc.

General characteristics
- Class & type: VC2-S-AP3 Victory ship, then rebuilt in 1946 to Lt. James E. Robinson-class cargo ship
- Displacement: 4,512 metric tons (4,441 long tons) (standard); 15,589 metric tons (15,343 long tons) (full load)
- Length: 455 ft (139 m)
- Beam: 62 ft (19 m)
- Draft: 29 ft 2 in (8.89 m)
- Installed power: 8,500 shp (6,300 kW)
- Propulsion: 1 × steam turbine; 1 × shaft
- Speed: 15.5 knots (28.7 km/h; 17.8 mph)
- Complement: 12 Officers; 87 Enlisted
- Armament: 1 × 5 inch (127 mm)/38 caliber gun (Czechoslovakia Victory only); 1 × 3 inch (76 mm)/50 caliber gun (Czechoslovakia Victory only); 8 × 20 mm Oerlikon (Czechoslovakia Victory only); None as James E. Robinson

USNS Lt. James E. Robinson (T-AKV-3/T-AG-170/T-AK-274) was a U.S. Navy cargo ship, which was launched as a World War II commercial Victory ship SS Czechoslovakia Victory under the Emergency Shipbuilding program. She had earlier been the U.S. Army's USAT LT. James E. Robinson before being acquired by the U.S. Navy.

== Construction ==
SS Czechoslovakia Victory was laid down as a VC2-S-AP2 type Victory ship under U.S. Maritime Commission contract as by Oregon Shipbuilding Corporation, Portland, Oregon, 25 November 1943; launched 20 January 1944; sponsored by Miss Barbara Vickery; and delivered to her operator, American Hawaiian Steamship Corp., 11 March 1944. In 1948 she was renamed the Lt. James E. Robinson (AKV 3).

== World War II service ==
SS Czechoslovakia Victory was owned by the Maritime Commission, she served on the merchant sealanes under the control of the War Shipping Administration during the remainder of World War II. She was operated by the American-Hawaiian SS Company On 8 August 1946 with the war over she was chartered to Black Diamond Steamship Company. On 17 November 1947 she was laid up in the National Defense Reserve Fleet at the James River. On 3 May 1948 she was removed from the Reserve Fleet and transferred to the Army Transportation Service as USAT LT. James E. Robinson. On 1 March 1950 she was transferred by the Maritime Administration to the US Navy and assigned to duty under the Military Sea Transportation Service (MSTS). The USNS Sgt. Jack J. Pendleton (T-AKV-5) was also transferred to the Army Transportation Service at the same time and both ships were given the Lt. James E. Robinson-class cargo ship designation.

== Post-war service ==
Crewed by civilians, Lt. James E. Robinson operated out of U.S. East Coast ports, primarily New York City, while making runs to ports in West Germany and the British Isles. In September 1953 she expanded the scope of her operations with a supply and logistics run to the Mediterranean which sent her to Greece, Turkey, and Trieste.

She maintained this pattern of Mediterranean and western European cruises during the next 7 years. In addition, during the periods of August 1955, August–September 1956, and July October 1958, she carried cargo to Thule Air Base, Greenland, in support of military defense construction projects. Late in November 1958, again expanding her area of operations, she cruised to ports in the Red Sea, the Gulf of Aden, and the Persian Gulf before returning to New York City 31 January 1959.

== Vietnam-era operations ==
Lt. James E. Robinson was reclassified AK-274 in May 1959 while operating in the Atlantic Ocean. Between 1 August 1960 and 9 September she steamed from New York to Saigon, South Vietnam, carrying cargo for the American military effort there. After making ports in Formosa, South Korea, and Japan, she returned to New York via the U.S. West Coast 29 November, thence resumed transatlantic cargo service 16 December.

== Circumnavigating the globe ==
During April and May 1961 she cruised to the Indian Ocean and back; and between 19 August and 5 January 1962, she circumnavigated the globe steaming from Davisville, Rhode Island, and back via the Panama Canal, Australia, the Suez Canal, and Gibraltar.

During much of 1962 and 1963 Lt. James E. Robinson took part in special logistics operations in the South Atlantic and the Indian Oceans. Reclassified AG-170 in December 1962, she operated out of Cape Town and Durban, South Africa, and ranged the African coast from Liberia to Kenya.

She continued these operations during the first 4 months of 1964 and returned to New York 31 May via Suez and Rota, Spain. She again reclassified AK-274 on 1 July 1964 and resumed transatlantic cargo runs to western European ports. Continuing this duty through 1969, she remained assigned to the Atlantic Area of MSTS.

== Inactivation ==
Lt. James E. Robinson was placed out of service at an unknown date and was transferred to the Maritime Administration (MARAD), 17 March 1976, for lay up in the National Defense Reserve Fleet. She was struck from the Navy List on 16 January 1981 and was sold for scrap to Andy Exports, Inc., on 26 May 1983.

== Honors and awards ==
SS Czechoslovakia (Lt. James E. Robinson)received one battle star for World War II service for war action from 10 April 1945 to 26 April 1945 for the assault occupation of Okinawa. She also earned the National Defense Service Medal, Vietnam Service Medal and the Republic of Vietnam Campaign Medal.

== See also ==
- List of Victory ships
- Liberty ship
- Type C1 ship
- Type C2 ship
- Type C3 ship

== Sources ==
- Sawyer, L.A. and W.H. Mitchell. Victory ships and tankers: The history of the ‘Victory’ type cargo ships and of the tankers built in the United States of America during World War II, Cornell Maritime Press, 1974, 0-87033-182-5.
- United States Maritime Commission:
- Victory Cargo Ships
