= Joseph Keshet =

Israeli professor of Computer Science

- יוסף קשת
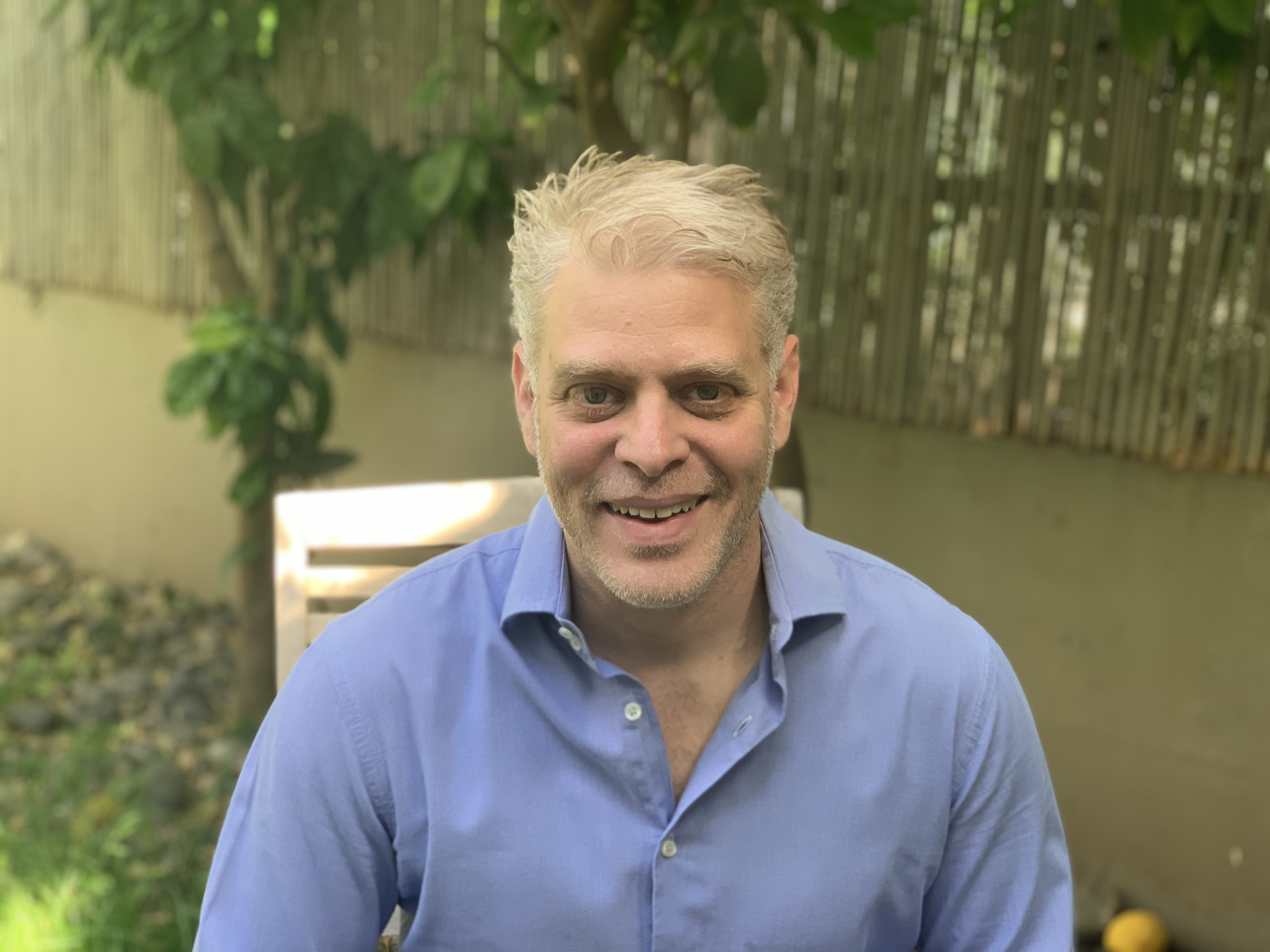
- Born: Tel-Aviv, Israel
- Education: Tel-Aviv University; Hebrew University of Jerusalem
- Scientific career
- Fields: Computer Science
- Workplaces: Technion; Bar-Ilan University
- Thesis: Large Margin Algorithms for Discriminative Continuous Speech (2008)
- Doctoral advisor: Yoram Singer

Joseph (Yossi) Keshet (Hebrew: יוסף (יוסי) קשת; born: 28 February 1973) is an Israeli professor in the Electrical and Computer Engineering Faculty of the Technion, where he is the director of the Speech, Language, and Deep Learning Lab. His research focuses on human speech processing and machine learning.

== Early life and education ==
Keshet was born in Tel-Aviv. He graduated from the Amal School and began his academic studies at the Department of Electrical Engineering-Systems at Tel-Aviv University in 1991 and received his B.Sc. (Cum Laude) in 1994. Keshet served in the IDF Unit 8200 from 1995 to 2002 as the head of the speech processing research section in the R&D Center. During his service, he received a national award from the Administration for the Development of Weapons and Technological Infrastructure (Maf’at). Keshet was award his M.Sc. from the same department after he completed his Israel Defense Force service in 2002. His Dissertation was titled: Stop consonant spotting in continuous speech and was supervised by Dan Chazan from IBM Research Labs, Haifa. He continued his Ph.D. studies at the Hebrew University of Jerusalem until 2008. Prof. Yoram Singer supervised his thesis on Large Margin Algorithms for Discriminative Continuous Speech.

== Career ==
Keshet was a Research Associate (postdoc) at IDIAP Research Institute, Martigny, Switzerland in 2007, and joined the TTI-Chicago and Department of Computer Science, University of Chicago, Chicago, IL in 2009 as Research Assistant Professor. In 2013, he returned to Israel and joined the Computer Science department at Bar-Ilan University as a senior lecturer and head of the Speech, Language, and Deep Learning Lab. In 2020, Keshet became a Founding Venture Partner at the Disruptive AI Venture Capital. In the same year, he also joined Amazon in Tel-Aviv as an Amazon Scholar. In 2022, Keshet joined the Faculty of Electrical and Computer Engineering at the Technion.

== Research ==
Keshet's research work focuses on both machine learning and computational study of human speech and language. His work on speech and language concentrates on speech processing, speech recognition, acoustic phonetics, and pathological speech. In machine learning, Keshet is focused on deep learning and structured tasks.

According to Google Scholar (September 2020), Keshet is one of the 15 most cited researchers in the field of spoken language processing.

The algorithms that were developed in the Speech, Language, and Deep Learning Lab can analyze different pathological conditions in the throat and vocal cords based on the subject's voice. Other algorithms showed that the voice can be used to estimate physical and emotional state of the speaker. Another research led by Keshet suggested that it is possible to fool structured AI systems (like Google Voice).

== Membership in professional societies ==
Keshet is the founder and chair of the Machine Learning for Speech and Language Processing Special Interest Group (SIGML) of the International Speech Communication Association (ISCA), from 2011. He is a senior member of the IEEE Signal Processing Society since 2018 and a member of ISCA since 2002.

== Publications ==
Prof. Keshet has authored more than 70 scientific publications and edited one book.

=== Book ===
Joseph Keshet and Samy Bengio, Eds., Automatic Speech and Speaker Recognition: Large Margin and Kernel Methods, John Wiley & Sons, March 2009.

=== Selected articles ===
- Jacob T. Cohen, Alma Cohen, Limor Benyamini, Yossi Adi, Joseph Keshet, Predicting glottal closure insufficiency using fundamental frequency contour analysis, Head & Neck, Journal of the Sciences and Specialities of the Head and Neck, Volume 41, Issue 7, pp. 2324–2331, July 2019.
- Yehoshua Dissen, Jacob Goldberger, and Joseph Keshet, Formant Estimation and Tracking: A Deep Learning Approach, Journal of the Acoustical Society of America, 145 (2), February 2019.
- Joseph Keshet, Automatic speech recognition: A primer for speech-language pathology researchers, International Journal of Speech-Language Pathology, Vol. 20 No. 6, pp. 599–609, 2018.
- Yossi Adi, Carsten Baum, Moustapha Cisse, Benny Pinkas, Joseph Keshet, Turning Your Weakness Into a Strength: Watermarking Deep Neural Networks by Backdooring, Usenix, 2018.
- Tzeviya Fuchs, Joseph Keshet, Spoken Term Detection Automatically Adjusted for a Given Threshold, IEEE Journal of Selected Topics in Signal Processing, Dec 2017, Volume 11, Issue 8, pp. 1–8.
- Moustapha Cisse, Yossi Adi, Natalia Neverova, Joseph Keshet, Houdini: Fooling Deep Structured Visual and Speech Recognition Models with Adversarial Examples, Neural Information and Processing Systems (NIPS), 2017.
- Joseph Keshet, Subhransu Maji, Tamir Hazan, and Tommi Jaakkola, Perturbation Models and PAC-Bayesian Generalization Bounds, in Perturbations, Optimization, and Statistics, Tamir Hazan, George Papandreou, and Daniel Tarlow, Eds., The MIT Press, 2016.
- Matthew Goldrick, Joseph Keshet, Erin Gustafson, Jordana Heller, and Jeremy Needle, Automatic Analysis of Slips of the Tongue: Insights into the Cognitive Architecture of Speech Production, Cognition, 149, 31–39, 2016.
- Joseph Keshet, Optimizing the Measure of Performance in Structured Prediction, in Advanced Structured Prediction, Sebastian Nowozin, Peter V. Gehler, Jeremy January, and Christoph H. Lampert, Eds., The MIT Press, 2014.
- Morgan Sonderegger and Joseph Keshet, Automatic Measurement of Voice Onset Time using Discriminative Structured Prediction, Journal of the Acoustical Society of America, Vol. 132, Issue 6, pp. 3965−3979, 2012.
- David McAllester, Tamir Hazan and Joseph Keshet, Direct Loss Minimization for Structured Prediction, The 24th Annual Conference on Neural Information Processing Systems (NIPS), 2010.
- Joseph Keshet, David Grangier and Samy Bengio, Discriminative Keyword Spotting, Speech Communication, Volume 51, Issue 4, pp. 317–329, April 2009.

== Personal life ==
Keshet is married to Lital. They have three children.
