= INS Keshet =

INS Keshet has been borne by at least two ships of the Israeli Sea Corps:

- INS Keshet (1973), a Sa'ar 4-class missile boat launched in 1973 and sold to Chile in 1981
- INS Keshet (1982), a Sa'ar 4.5-class missile boat launched in 1982
